= Cumbarjua Canal =

Distributary channel in Goa, India

Coordinates: 15.5110°N 73.9436°E

The Cumbarjua Canal is a distributary channel formed by the merger of the Mandovi and Zuari rivers in Goa, India. Its flow has led to the formation of river deltas; the most prominent of them are Ilhas de Goa, Cumbarjua and St Estevam.

The shallow mangroves of the waterbody is the natural habitat of the Indian Mugger crocodile as well as exotic birds and flying fish. Wildlife boating tours are now a common tourist activity.

== Banastarim Wetlands ==
The Banastarim Wetlands, a large swamp and biosphere reserve on the Ilhas de Goa, is fed by the Cumbarjua Canal.

== Transport ==
In order of people to commute across the islands, bridges have been constructed and ferry services have been made available.

=== Ferries ===
This method of transport is more traditional.

- Daujim in Ilhas de Goa to Tolto in St Estevam.
- Gaundalim to Cumbarjua.
- Marcaim to Cortalim
- Tonka to Sarmanas

=== Bridges ===
Most (if not all) of the bridges on this list have been constructed in the post-1961 era.

- Meta Bridge: Links Corlim in Goa to Banastarim in Ponda.
- Gandaulim-Cumbarjua Bridge: Links Gandaulim to Cumbarjua.
- Cumbarjua-Orgao Bridge: Links Cumbarjua to Orgao.
- Cumbarjua-Marcel Bridge: Links Cumbarjua to Marcel.
- Tonca Bridge: Links Candola to Tonca in St Estevam.
- 2 Acada Bridges: Links the rest of St Estevam to the settlement of Acada (Akhada).
