= Betqui =

Village in Goa

Coordinates: 15°31′N 73°59′E

Betqui or Betki is a village in the Ponda taluka (sub-district) of Goa.

== Area, population ==
Its location code on the 2011 Census of India is 626844.

According to the official 2011 Census, Betqui or Betki in Ponda taluka has an area of 629 hectares, a total of 382 households, a population of 1,707 (comprising 871 males and 836 females) with an under-six population of 151 (comprising 77 boys and 74 girls).

== Location ==
Betqui is located in the north-eastern corner of Ponda taluka. It is near to Candola or Khandola, Orgao, Banastarim and Volvoi.

== Postal services ==
Betki B.O. is a delivery-based branch office, connected to the Marcela S.O. which lies under the Goa Division of the Panaji Region and the Maharashtra Circle for postal services. Betki's PIN code is 403107. Betki shares this PIN code with Amona B.O., Banastarim B.O., Cumbharjua B.O. and the Marcela B.O.

== Environment ==
The Betki-Khandola area was said to be the centre of illegal sand mining in December 2020.

According to Rajendra P. Kerkar, writing in 2018, the Mandodarichem tollem in Betqui is one of Goa's largest "man-made lakes". But the lake has silted and faced sustained neglect over the years. The lake is associated with the ancient Shree Mandodari Temple.

== Mandodari legend ==
A local legend, retold by Rajendra P. Kerkar in 2018, explains how the Mandodarichem tollem came to be. In the 16th century the villagers set out to dig a large tank to collect water from the valley's springs and monsoon streams, so that their fields and orchards could be watered all year. Every mud embankment they raised gave way, and they finally decided to offer a blood sacrifice. They chose a girl named Mandodari and her brother, Narbando, whose widowed mother's home stood close to the tank. After their deaths the embankment held.

When the mother learned how her children had died, she cursed the village, declaring that no rice would be cooked in Betki for 24 years. Around this time the Fadte Gaonkar community, fleeing religious persecution by the Portuguese, moved to Betki from Verna in Salcete. They found the widow, who had by then moved to a neighbouring village, and persuaded her to shorten the curse from 24 years to 24 hours. On their return the villagers built a shrine to Mandodari and Narbando beside the tank.

The girl Mandodari is the village's deity. She shares her name with Mandodari, the wife of Ravana, and is sometimes mistaken for her. Every year on Maha Shivaratri, a palanquin procession is brought to her shrine. The Betki writer R. B. Phadte cites a local saying, Shil Savoi, Betki aavai, which he explains as meaning that Betki is the mother of the tank and Savoi its body. The tank is still the village's main source of irrigation water and recharges the water table of four nearby villages.
