= Ponda taluka =

Ponda Konkani: Fonde Portuguese: Pondá
- Taluka
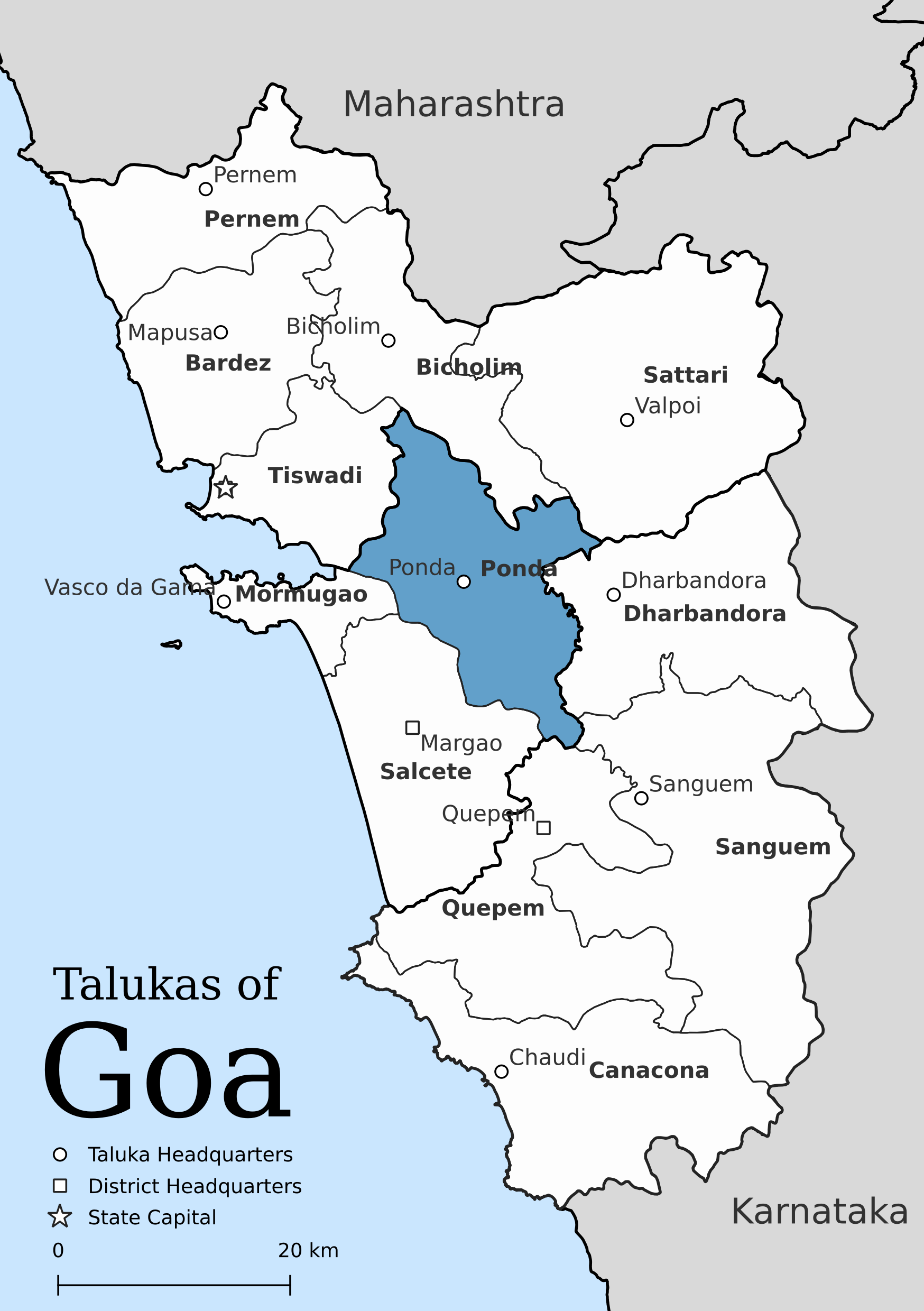
- Location of Ponda taluka in South Goa district in Goa
- Coordinates: 15.40°N 74.02°E
- Country: India
- State: Goa
- District: South Goa
- Headquarters: Ponda

Government
  - Lok Sabha constituency: North Goa (part); South Goa (part)

Population (2011)
  - Total: 165,830

Demographics
  - Literacy rate: 89.21%
  - Sex ratio: 940 females per 1,000 males
- PIN: 4034XX
- Vehicle registration: GA-05

Ponda taluka is a subdivision of the district of South Goa, in the Indian state of Goa. Its administrative headquarters is the town of Ponda.

== Location ==
Ponda taluka was part of North Goa district until 2015, when the state cabinet approved moving it to South Goa district. The taluka takes its name from its headquarters town, Ponda.

== Antruz Mahal ==
Before Portuguese rule, the Ponda area was known as Antruz Mahal (also written Antaruj).

== Temples and mosques ==
The taluka is known for its Hindu temples. As the Portuguese destroyed temples in the territory they ruled during the 16th century, deities from many of those shrines were carried into Antruz Mahal for safety. Of the temples near Ponda town, the Mangesh and Shantadurga temples are the most important. Others include Nagesh, Ramnath and Mahalakshmi at Bandora, and Mahalasa at Mardol. The Shantadurga temple stands at Queula, and the Mangesh temple at Mangueshi, a hamlet of Priol village.

In the 1970s the taluka had 27 mosques. The largest was the Safa Shahouri Masjid in Ponda town, built in 1560 by Ibrahim Adil Shah.

== Capital ==
The capital of this subdistrict of Ponda, also called Ponda (town or city), lies 28 km south east of the state-capital Panaji or Panjim. It is some 17 km north-east of Margao.

== History ==
From 1706 the area was ruled by the kings of Sonda, first as vassals of the Mughal emperor Aurangzeb and later of the Maratha ruler Shahu. Around 1740 the Maratha general Annaji Prabhu took it from them. In June 1742 he surrendered the fort of Ponda (Mardangad) to the Portuguese, who returned the district to Sonda.

In 1763 the Portuguese recognised Sonda's sovereignty over Ponda only in name, and the Sonda king had to pay for a Portuguese garrison there. When Hyder Ali of Mysore overran Sonda, its king took refuge in Goa in January 1764. He agreed that Ponda, Zambaulim and Canacona would stay with the Portuguese until he won back his kingdom. He never did, and a treaty of 17 January 1771 made the cession permanent. The Gazetteer also records the cession of "Antaruj alias Ponda" as confirmed in 1791. Ponda became one of the Novas Conquistas (New Conquests), the territories Portugal added to Goa in the 18th century.

Under the Portuguese, Ponda was administered as a concelho; the Gazetteer lists a Concelho of Ponda in 1881 and 1900. The census treats these concelhos as the equivalent of today's talukas. The town of Ponda grew up under Portuguese rule, first as an administrative centre with government offices and a court, and later as a commercial centre.

== Ponda today ==
Goa College of Engineering is located in Farmagudi village, in Ponda taluka, on the outskirts of Ponda town.

== Government ==
The taluka falls in five Goa Legislative Assembly constituencies. Ponda, Shiroda and Marcaim belong to the South Goa Lok Sabha constituency. Priol and Valpoi, which takes in only the Usgao area of the taluka, belong to the North Goa Lok Sabha constituency.

== Demographics ==
At the time of the 2011 Census of India, the taluka had a population of 165,830 with sex ratio of 940 females to 1000 males. Ponda taluka has an average literacy rate of 89.21%: male literacy is 93.56% and female literacy is 84.58%. Scheduled Castes and Scheduled Tribes make up 1.16% and 16.64% of the population respectively. 62.50% of the population lives in urban areas.

=== Languages ===
Languages of Ponda Taluka (2011)
1. Konkani (69.0%)
2. Marathi (10.7%)
3. Hindi (8.43%)
4. Kannada (3.52%)
5. Urdu (2.32%)
6. Malayalam (1.15%)
7. Others (4.87%)

Konkani is the most spoken language in Ponda taluka.

At the time of 2011 Census of India, 69.05% of the population of Ponda taluka spoke Konkani, 10.66% Marathi, 8.43% Hindi, 3.52% Kannada, 2.32% Urdu and 1.15% Malayalam as their first language.

=== Religion ===
Religion in Ponda Taluka (2011)
Religion	Percent
Hinduism	83.64%
Christianity	8.45%
Islam	7.56%
Others	0.35%

Hinduism is followed by the majority of population of Ponda taluka. Christians and Muslims form significant minorities. At the time of the 2011 Census of India 83.64% of the population of the taluka followed Hinduism, 8.45% Christianity, 7.56% Islam and 0.35% of the population followed other religions or did not state religion.

== List of towns, including census towns, in Ponda taluka ==
The 2011 census recorded ten towns in the taluka.

- Bandora (Census Town)
- Borim (Census Town)
- Candola (Census Town)
- Curti (Census Town)
- Marcaim (Census Town)
- Orgao (Census Town)
- Ponda (Municipal Council)
- Priol (Census Town)
- Quela (Census Town)
- Usgao (Census Town)

== List of villages in Ponda taluka ==
The 2011 census recorded 22 villages in the taluka.

- Adcolna
- Betora (Bethora)
- Betqui (Betki)
- Boma
- Candepar(Khandepar)
- Codar
- Conxem
- Cuncoliem
- Cundaim (Kundaim)
- Durbhat
- Gangem
- Nirancal
- Ponchavadi (Panchvadi)
- Querim (Keri)
- Savoi-Verem
- Siroda (Shiroda)
- Telaulim (Talaulim)
- Tivrem
- Vadi
- Vagurbem
- Velinga (Veling)
- Volvoi

== See also ==
- Ponda, Goa
