= Boma (Ponda) =

Village in India

Coordinates: 15.476°N 73.966°E

Boma is a village in the Ponda taluka (sub-district) of Goa. It is located in the northern part of Ponda taluka. It is on the road connecting state capital Panjim (or Panaji) with the taluka headquarters of Ponda town.

== Location in Ponda taluka ==
It is situated along the highway, and lies close to Cundaim (or Kundaim), and before Mardol, known for its scenic and prominent temples. In its vicinity, to its east, lie Querim (or Keri), Savoi-Verem and Volvoi.

== Area, population ==
According to the official 2011 Census, the village has an area of 394.60 hectares, a total of 653 households, and a population of 2,807 (comprising 1,467 males and 1,340 females) with an under-six population of 284 (comprising 149 boys and 135 girls).

Its location code number in the Census (2011) is 626848.

== Local jurisdiction ==
Boma comes under the Bhoma Adcolna village panchayat or local council body.

== Political constituencies ==
Boma comes under the Priol assembly constituency of the Goa Legislative Assembly and the North Goa parliamentary constituency for Parliament. Its nearest town is Ponda.
