= Tiswadi taluka =

Taluka in North Goa, India

Tiswadi Konkani: Tiswadi Portuguese: Ilhas de Goa, lit. 'Islands of Goa'
- Taluka
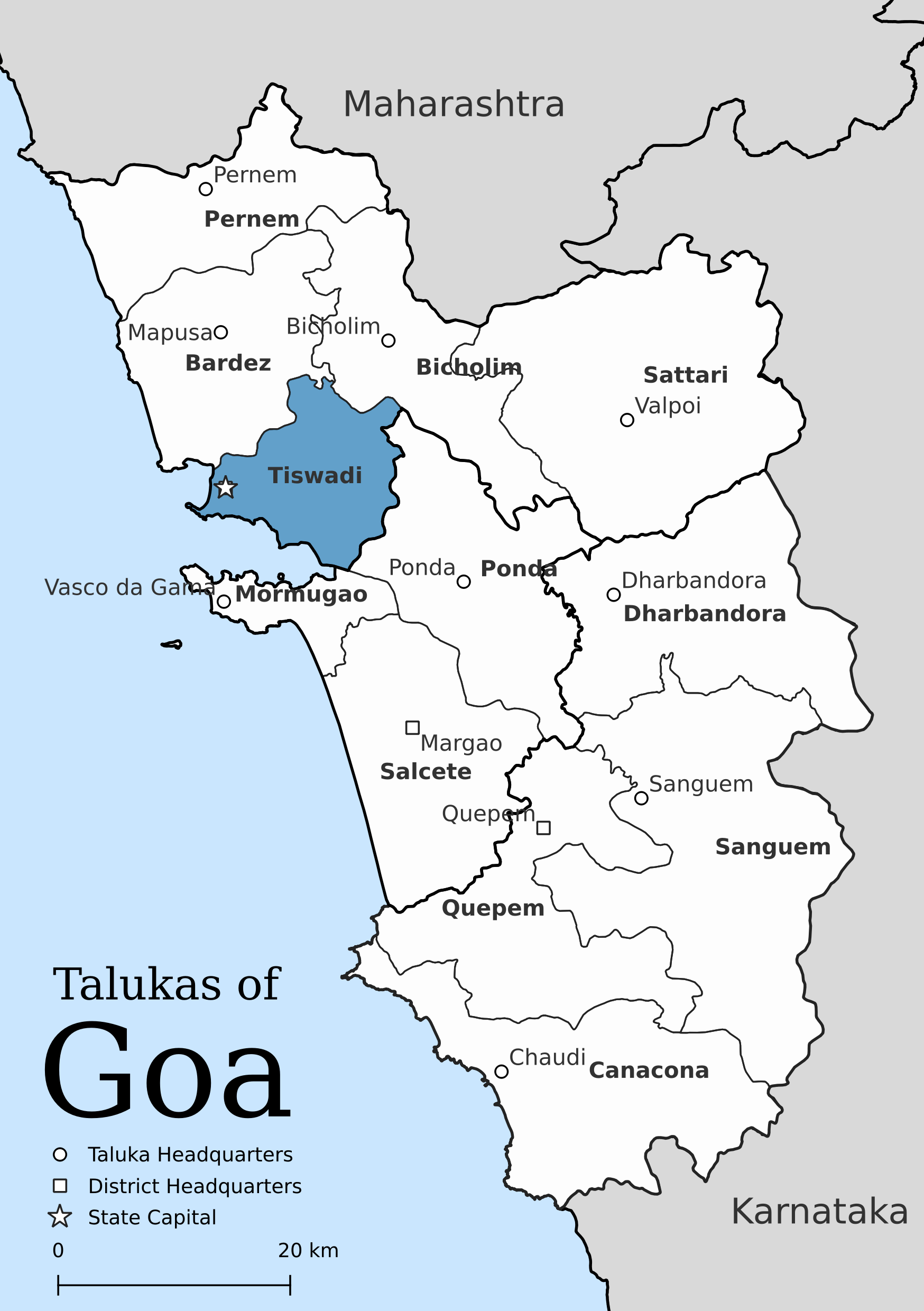
- Location of Tiswadi in North Goa, Goa
- Coordinates: 15.498598°N 73.829341°E
- Country: India
- State: Goa
- District: North Goa
- Headquarters: Panaji
- Settlements: 1 City; 9 Towns; 22 Villages

Government
  - Tehsildar: na
  - Lok Sabha constituency: North Goa
  - Assembly constituency: na
  - MLA: na

Area
  - Total: 193.64 km^{2} (74.76 sq mi)

Population (2011)
  - Total: 177,219
  - Density: 915.20/km^{2} (2,370.4/sq mi)

Demographics
  - Literacy rate: 81.83%
  - Sex ratio: 966
- Vehicle registration: GA-07
- Rain: na

Tiswadi, formerly known as Ilhas, is a taluka in the district of North Goa, situated in the Indian coastal state of Goa. It is an estuarine island situated on the confluence of the Mandovi and Zuari rivers. It was one of the first territories to be annexed by the Portuguese in the 16th century. Both the state capital Panaji, and the erstwhile capital Old Goa lie within the sub-district. It is the biggest and the most populated of the six major islands between the Mandovi and Zuari rivers.

== Geography ==
It is geographically made up of several small riverine islands within the Mandovi River forming its northern boundary, the Cumbarjua Canal making its eastern border, and the Zuari River making up its southern border.

As the native name suggests, the sub-district includes the smaller islands of:

- Chorão,
- Divar,
- St Estevam,
- Cumbarjua,
- Vanxim and
- Several other small mangrove islands and sand banks.

== History ==
Tiswadi, along with the rest of Goa, regularly exchanged hands between the Muslim Bhahmani Sultanate and the Hindu Vijayanagara Empire of South India prior to the 14th century. By the 15th century, the Bijapur Sultanate under the Adil Shahi dynasty conquered Goa, and it came under Muslim rule. The City of Goa was the regional capital of the sultanates as well as a hub for the Hajj pilgrimage. Numerous temples were demolished under the rule of the sultanates. The Adil Shahi dynasty was defeated by a Portuguese–Vijayanagar alliance, and Ilhas de Goa was conquered under Afonso de Albuquerque in 1510. By the time Tiswadi was relieved from Muslim rule, Hindus formed a minority in the region, and the Portuguese started conversion efforts against the Muslim majority. The populace was made to accept Christianity or leave the islands. There was a mass exodus of natives who left the islands, for the safer havens of Ponda and the Canara, Malabar Coast, Chandgad and Joida.

The first temple to be built in Panjim was in the mid-1700s, when the Portuguese authorities granted permission to the Hindus to build their place of worship.

The evangelization of Tiswadi was spearheaded by the Dominicans, who were assigned 15 villages, and the Jesuits, who were assigned the remaining part along with the smaller islands of Chorão and Divar, by the Portuguese authorities. In 1552, the island of Chorão had a population of 300 Christians out of 3,000 and, by this time, also had a small church which was visited by a Jesuit from St. Paul's every Sunday. By the end of 1559, over 1,200 had accepted baptism. The following year, the first bishop from the Jesuit order, Dom João Nunes de Barreto, set up residence in Chorão, which eventually became a Noviciate. Most of Chorão's population converted en masse to Roman Catholicism in mid-1560.

By January 1563, the Jesuit provincial claimed that Ilhas de Goa had been completely Christianized, with a population of 70,000, the great majority of which had converted in the last six years, corresponding to the terms of Viceroys Francisco Barreto and Constantino of Braganza, whose 2 1/2-year term saw between 25,000 and 30,000 conversions.

== Demographics ==
As per the 2011 Census of India, Tiswadi taluka has a population of 177,219 people. The sex-ratio of Tiswadi taluka is around 966, compared to the state average of 973. The literacy rate of Tiswadi taluka is 81.83% out of which 84.49% males are literate and 79.07% females are literate. Scheduled Castes and Scheduled Tribes make up 1.81% and 10.60% of the population respectively. The total area of Tiswadi is 193.64 sq.km with population density of 915 per sq.km. 78.81% of population of the taluka lives in urban areas.

=== Languages ===
Languages of Tiswadi Taluka (2011)
1. Konkani (65.5%)
2. Hindi (10.6%)
3. Marathi (6.62%)
4. Kannada (5.27%)
5. Urdu (2.78%)
6. Malayalam (1.31%)
7. Telugu (1.26%)
8. English (1.14%)
9. Others (5.47%)

Konkani is the most spoken language in Tiswadi taluka.

At the time of the 2011 Census of India, 65.51% of the population of Tiswadi taluka spoke Konkani, 10.64% Hindi, 6.62% Marathi, 5.27% Kannada, 2.77% Urdu, 1.31% Malayalam, 1.26% Telugu and 1.14% English as their first language.

=== Religion ===
Religion in Tiswadi Taluka (2011)
Religion	Percent
Hinduism	62.50%
Christianity	27.73%
Islam	9.27%
Other or not stated	0.50%

The majority of the population in Tiswadi taluka follow Hinduism, although Christians and Muslims are a significant minority.

62.50% of the population in the taluka follow Hinduism, 27.73% Christianity, 9.27% Islam and the remaining 0.50% follow other religions or stated no religion.

== Notable sites ==
Towns in the area include Panjim, Velha Goa and its monuments, Divar, Chorão St Estevam, Cumbarjua, and Vanxim.

Tiswadi taluka has many beaches.

The area contains the Dr. Salim Ali Bird Sanctuary and the Basilica of Bom Jesus.

== Settlements ==
=== Cities ===
#	City	State	Population
1	Panjim Municipal Corporation	Goa	40000

=== Towns ===
#	Town	State	Population
1	Chimbel Census Town	Goa	15,289
2	Calapor or Santa Cruz, Goa Census Town	Goa	14,077
3	Murda, Census Town	Goa	7,517
4	Bambolim Census Town	Goa	6,885
5	Corlim Census Town	Goa	6,568
6	Mercurim Census Town	Goa	4,970
7	Cumbarjua Census Town	Goa	4,917
8	Goa Velha Census Town	Goa	4,322
9	Jua Census Town	Goa	4,134
10	Old Goa (Velha Goa) Census Town	Goa	2,550
11	Ribandar Census Town	Goa	2,450
12	Tiswadi Census Town	Goa	2,300

=== Villages ===
#	Villages	Administrative Division	Population
1	Ambarim	Tiswadi	93
2	Azossim	Tiswadi	1,142
3	Bainguinim	Tiswadi	1,501
4	Batim	Tiswadi	1,489
5	Capão	Tiswadi	135
6	Caraim	Tiswadi	202
7	Carambolim	Tiswadi	5,179
8	Chorão	Tiswadi	5,268
9	Curca	Tiswadi	2,518
10	Ella	Tiswadi	5,372
11	Gancim	Tiswadi	519
12	Gandaulim	Tiswadi	301
13	Goalim Moula	Tiswadi	441
14	Goltim	Tiswadi	1,634
15	Malar	Tiswadi	1,630
16	Mandur	Tiswadi	3,113
17	Naroa	Tiswadi	487
18	Navelim	Tiswadi	1,133
19	Neura-O-Grande	Tiswadi	1,440
20	Neura-O-Pequeno	Tiswadi	563
21	Siridão	Tiswadi	2,417
22	Talaulim	Tiswadi	972

== Maps ==
The evidence of the existence of Ilhas de Goa can be seen on historic maps.

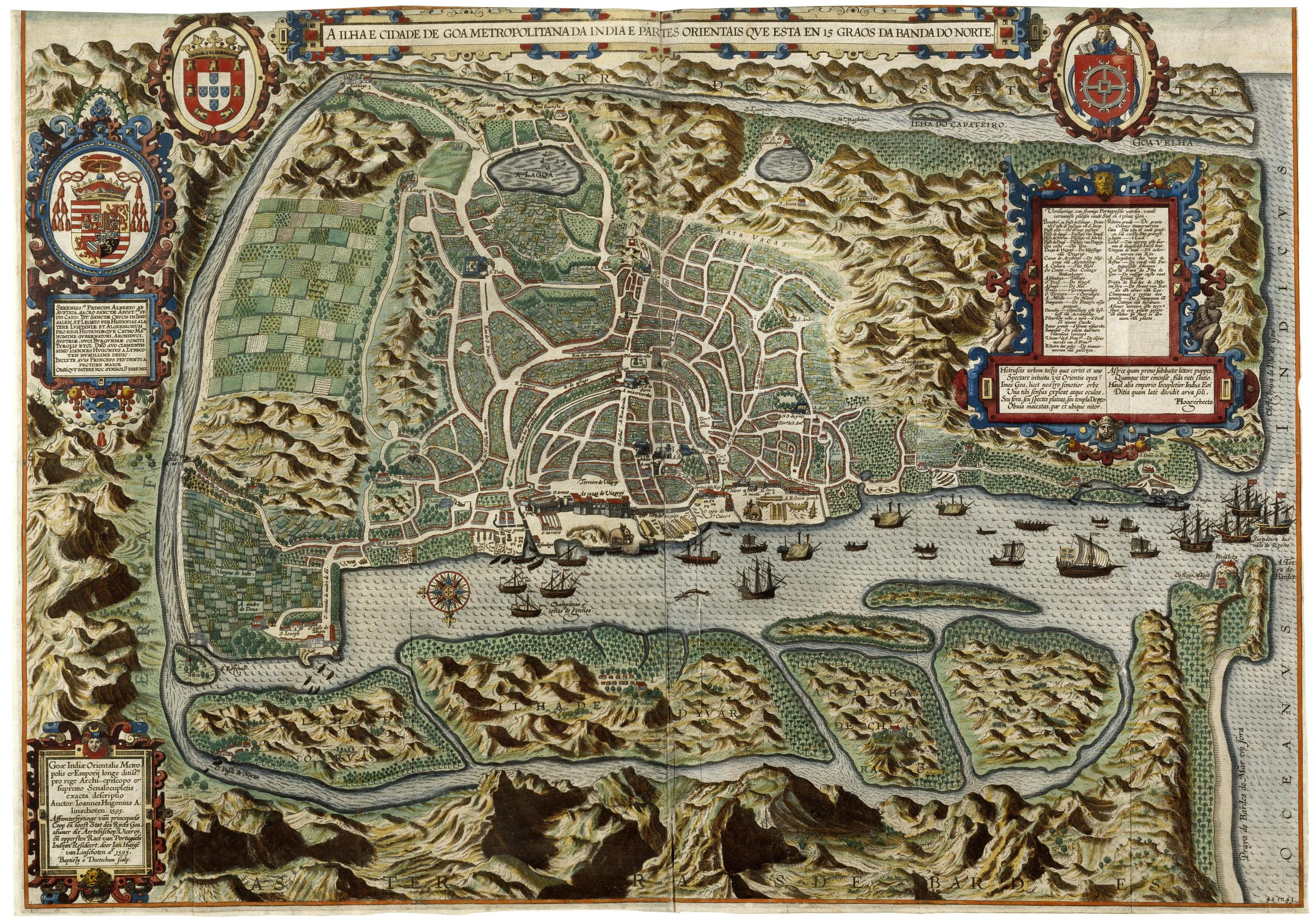
A historic map of the island of Goa, with an emphasis on the capital city

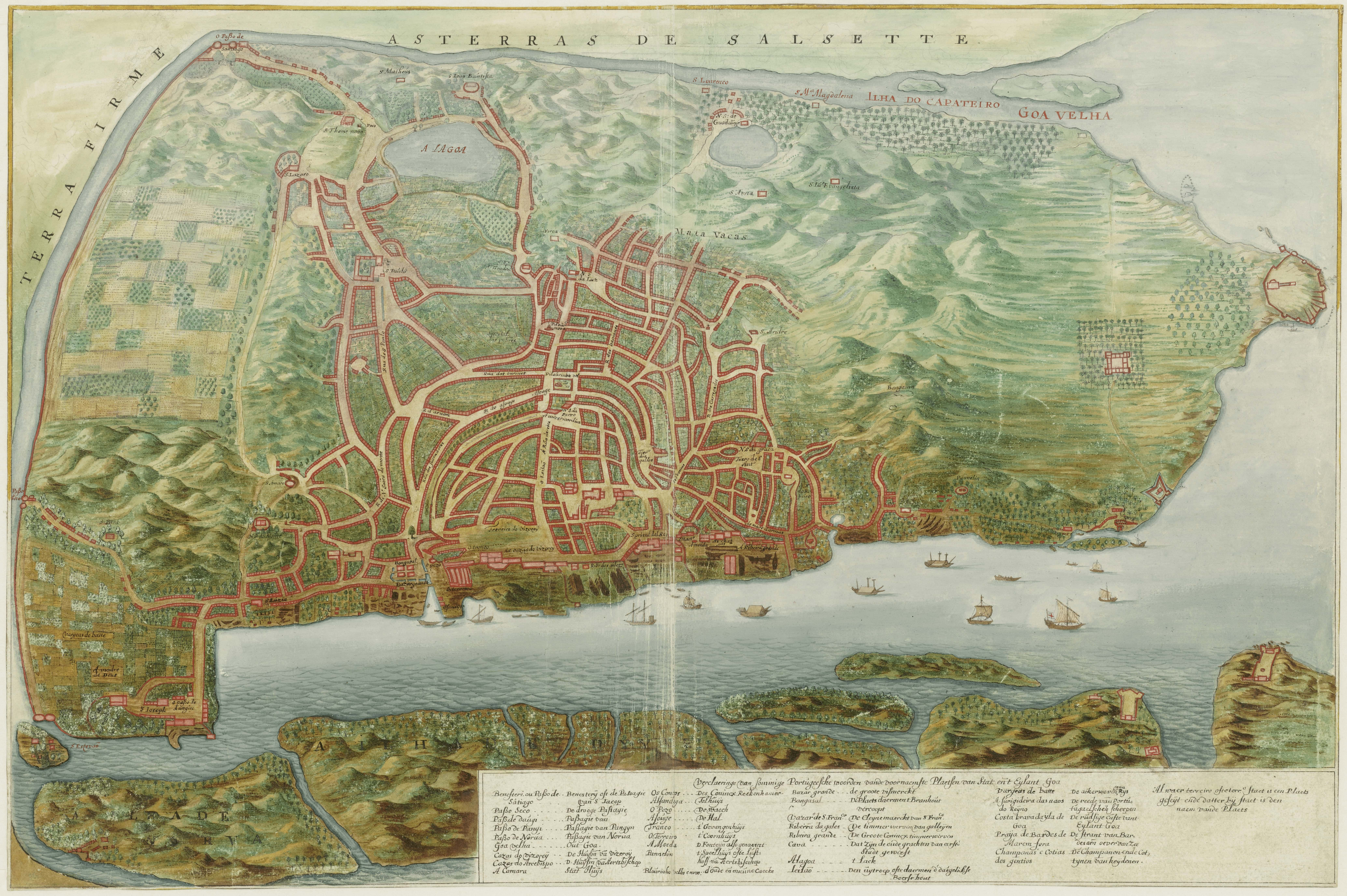
Another historic map of the island of Goa, with an emphasis on the capital city

== Water Bodies ==
The island lies within the water bodies of:

- Mandovi River to the north.
- Cumbarjua Canal to the east.
- Zuari River to the south.
- Arabian Sea to the west.

== Ferries ==
Prior to the construction of the bridges, the primary commute to and from the island was done via ferry. Some have become redundant, but most are still in use, they include:

- Panjim to Betim.
- Ribandar to Chorao.
- Ribandar to Divar.
- Old Goa to Divar.
- Daugim to Tolto in St Estevam.
- Gandaulim to Cumbarjua.
- Agaçaim to Cortalim.

== Bridges ==
There are a number of bridges built over the last hundred years, linking the island to other parts of the mainland.

=== Northern Bridges ===
These bridges are built over the Mandovi River. They pass through the villages of Penha de França and the city of Panjim:

- 2 Mandovi Bridges: Connects Goa to Bardes.
- Atal Bridge: Connects Goa to Bardes, but avoids the busy roads of Panjim entirely.

=== Eastern Bridges ===
These bridges are built over the Cumbarjua Canal.

- Gandaulim Bridge: Connects Gandaulim in Goa to Cumbarjua.
- Banastarim Bridge: Connects Corlim in Goa to Banastarim.

=== Southern Bridges ===
These bridges are built over the Zuari River. They pass through the villages of Agaçaim and Cortalim.

- Zuari Bridge: Connects Goa to Mormugão.
- A new Bridge is being constructed (similar in scale to the Atal Bridge) over the Zuari River.

=== Internal Bridges ===
These bridges are a link to places within the island, which are geographically close, but are separated by a body of water.

- Ponte Conde de Linhares: This links Panjim to Ribandar, and is the oldest and most famous of all the internal bridges.

== See also ==
- Konkani people
- History of Goa
- Salcette
- Bardez
- Goan Catholics
