= Jose Bismarque Dias =

Indian environmental activist and former priest (died 2015)

Bismarque Dias
- Born: Jose Bismarque Desidor Dias
- Died: 5–6 November 2015 (aged 51); St Estevam, Goa, India
- Cause of death: Disputed; police concluded accidental drowning
- Body discovered: 7 November 2015, Mandovi river, St Estevam
- Occupations: Activist, former priest
- Known for: Environmental and land-rights activism in Goa

Jose Bismarque Desidor Dias (died 5/6 November 2015), known as Fr Bismarque Dias, was an Indian environmental and land-rights activist and former Catholic priest from Goa. He campaigned against real-estate and tourism projects and illegal construction, mainly around his home village of St Estevam. His body was found in the Mandovi river in November 2015. Police concluded that he drowned accidentally, while his family and supporters maintain he was murdered.

== Background ==
Dias was from St. Estevam in Tiswadi, North Goa, and was 51 when he died. He was a priest of the Blessed Sacrament Fathers until a few years before his death. He was disrobed after differences with the Church over a land sale, though many still called him "Father". He contested the Cumbharjua seat in the 2012 Goa Legislative Assembly election and lost.

== Activism ==
Dias led protests against land-intensive projects across Goa and filed complaints before the National Green Tribunal alleging zoning violations by real-estate developers in St. Estevam. A writ petition he brought in the Bombay High Court over an illegal structure in a No Development Zone at St Estevam led to an interim sealing order in 2016, and the court directed its demolition in 2023. The Supreme Court then declined to interfere with that order, so his litigation continued to have effect years after his death.

== Death ==
Before his death, Dias recorded a video naming people, including local panchayat members and builders, whom he said should be held responsible if anything happened to him. He went missing on the night of 5 November 2015 after going for a swim during an overnight stay by the river and his body was found on 7 November near a sluice gate of the Mandovi at St Estevam. His family refused to hold the funeral and demanded a murder investigation.

=== Forensic findings ===
A first post-mortem gave the cause of death as asphyxia due to drowning. After demands from the family and activists who suspected foul play, the sub-divisional magistrate ordered a second autopsy by a three-member forensic panel at Goa Medical College, which said it would await chemical analysis before concluding. The second autopsy ruled out ante-mortem physical injury. A viscera analysis found no alcohol or common drugs and poisons, and the Crime Branch said this ruled out the earlier police account that Dias had been drinking. In December 2015 a diatom test by the Central Forensic Science Laboratory in Hyderabad found the diatoms in his sternum and lungs identical to those in a water sample from where the body was found, and police said this ruled out murder.

=== Disputed points ===
His supporters disputed the findings. Petitioners Sudeep Dalvi, Kennedy Afonso and Samir Kelekar said that injuries on his forehead and neck, recorded in the first inquest report on 7 November 2015, did not appear in the two later post-mortem reports. A blood-stained vest was found days after the body, and the petitioners asked what the stains were if not blood. Herald Goa reported that the Crime Branch found no blood on the exhibits, so no DNA profile could be made, and the petitioners asked for the vest to be re-examined. The NGO Goans for Goa said that five witnesses who saw Dias at 11:30 pm placed him at a different spot from the one the two youths gave, and that the Crime Branch had not examined them. It also argued that a drowning verdict did not mean the death was accidental.

=== Investigation ===
Goa Police initially said there was no prima facie evidence of foul play. After protests, Chief Minister Laxmikant Parsekar handed the case to the Crime Branch, saying he had wanted foul play examined from the start. The Crime Branch inquired into the death as an unnatural death under Section 174 of the Code of Criminal Procedure on the magistrate's order and questioned about 60 witnesses. A closure report concluding drowning was submitted to the sub-divisional magistrate of Tiswadi, and the family moved the High Court over lapses in the police investigation.

On 11 April 2017 the Bombay High Court bench at Panaji directed the Crime Branch to file an FIR, observing that police had a duty to register the case as murder given the family's complaint and the suspicious circumstances. It asked for progress reports every three months. The Crime Branch registered the death as murder, but a court rejected its request for polygraph tests on two key witnesses, citing their age and mental state. On 30 March 2018 the Crime Branch filed a closure report concluding that no case of murder was made out and that the death was accidental drowning. His brother Mario Dias rejected this, demanded a CBI probe and cited a forensic expert's concern that the second autopsy was done by doctors of the same department as the first. His supporters said they would seek to have the case reopened. Dias was buried at St Estevam on 6 November 2018, and supporters said the fight for justice would continue.
