= Cundaim =

Village in Goa, India

Coordinates: 15°28′N 73°59′E

Cundaim (Kundaim) is a village in the Ponda taluka (sub-district) of Goa.

== Area, population ==
As of 2001 the India census,,, Cundaim (Kundaim) in Ponda taluka has an area of 778.35 hectares, a total of 913 households, a population of 3,859 (comprising 1,988 males and 1,871 females) with an under-six years population of 371 (comprising 207 boys and 164 girls).

== Location ==
Cundaim (Kundaim) is located in the north-west part of Ponda taluka. Cundaim (Kundaim) is surrounded by Boma to its north, Mardol and Velinga to its east, and Marcela to its south. It is close to the border of Ponda taluka.

It lies approx 14 km from the sub-district (taluka) headquarters of Ponda town, and approx 20.6 km away from the district North Goa headquarters of Panaji or Panjim.

== Local jurisdiction ==
Cundaim (Kundaim) lies under the Kundaim gram panchayat.
