= Rudreshwar Devasthan =

Hindu temple in Goa, India

Shree Rudreshwar Devasthan is a Hindu temple situated in Harvale, located within the Sankhali area of Bicholim taluka. The site on which the temple is situated is locally referred to as Agar Devolakadle Thol.

== History and administration ==
There are no documented historical or mythological accounts regarding the site. However, records from the temple's constitutional regulations indicate that the shrine was established and constructed in ancient times by the Naik Bhandari community.

All hereditary patrons (mahajans) of the shrine belong to the Naik Bhandari community. According to the temple's original constitutional documents, a total of 1,833 mahajans were registered across 42 villages: Ribandar, Panaji, Karmali, Cumbarjua, Santan, Kudka, Pale, Bhovle, Mershi, Taleigão, Kalapur, Nuvem, Mapusa, Verem, Nilla, Candolim, Aldona, Shirgao, Mayem, Nanoda, Vangini, Pilgao, Sanquelim, Parye, Morye, Karapur, Kudne, Virdi, Gaonthan, Gavne, Vaghurme, Ravandole, Hadkolan, Durbhat, Karanzol, Mhaidol, Bhoma, Volvoi, Keri (Pernem), Arambol, Revora, and Mandrem.

To be enrolled in the official register of mahajans, an applicant must be a male member of the Naik Bhandari community who has attained 18 years of age.

== Deities ==
The primary deity of the temple is the Shree Rudreshwar Shivlinga. Several auxiliary deities are situated surrounding the primary shrine. Pandavanchyo Vhovchyo and Purvachari are situated to the west of the main deity. Nirakari is located to the east.

== Festivals and practices ==
The pilgrimage site hosts a major annual fair (jatra). On the morning following the festival of Mahashivratri, a chariot procession (Rathotsav) is conducted.

Devotees are permitted to perform ritual worship and abhisheka (sacred bathing of the deity) on Mahashivratri. Any registered mahajan originating from the village of Raibandar is traditionally honored and permitted to perform the abhisheka free of charge on this day.

Since ancient times, the site has served as a venue for performing Hindu rituals such as Narayan Bali and Nag Bali. The temple premises also contain facilities to accommodate post-funeral Vedic rites on the 11th and 12th days following a death, as well as the immersion of ashes (asthi visarjan).
