= Mandodari Temple, Betki =

Hindu temple in Goa, India

Coordinates: 15.506°N 73.990°E

Mandodari Temple
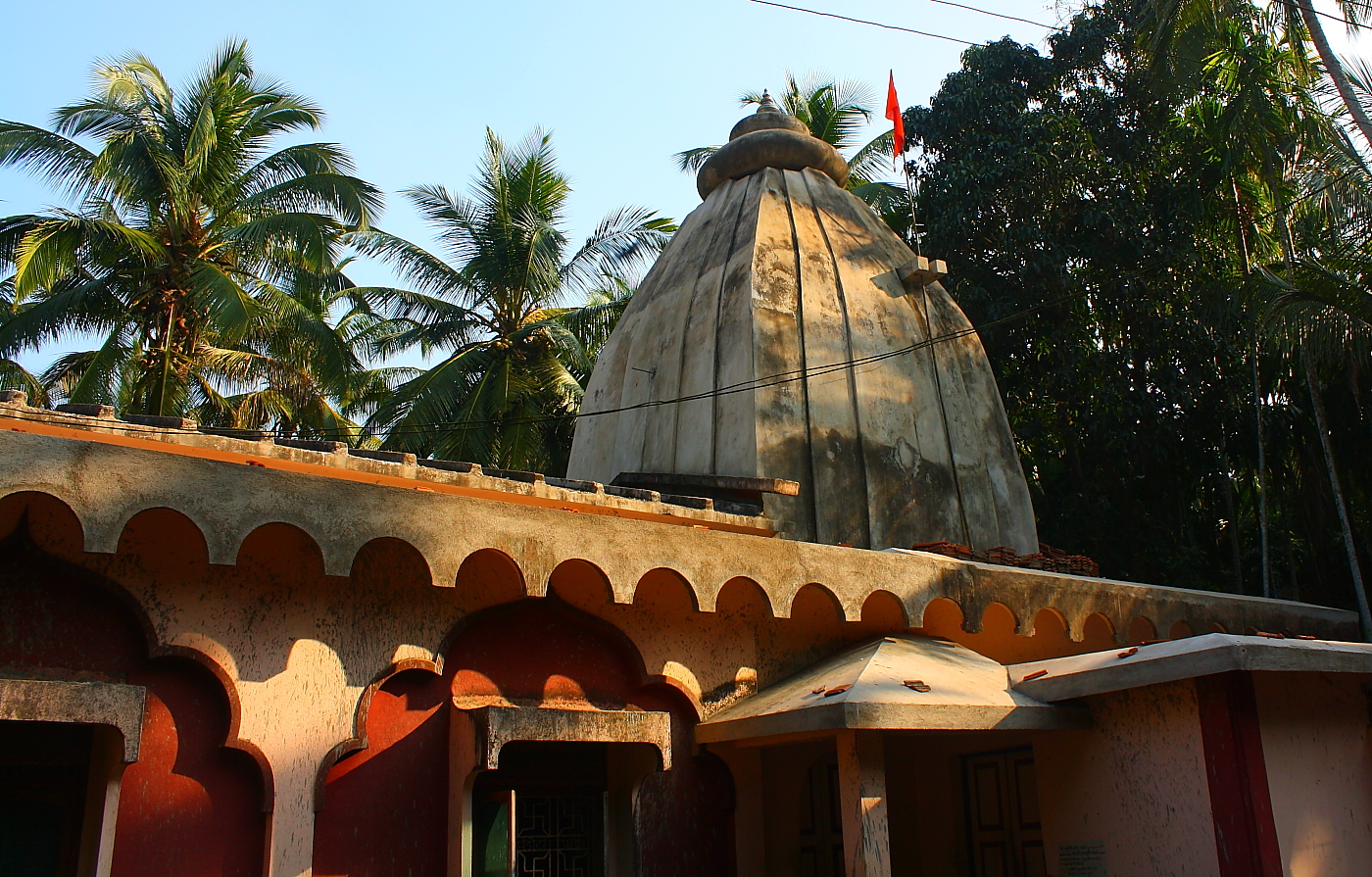

Religion
- Affiliation: Hinduism
- District: Ponda
- Deity: Mandodari

Location
- Location: Betki
- State: Goa
- Country: India
- Interactive map of Mandodari Temple

Shri Mandodari temple is a Hindu temple in the village of Betki, about 5 km from Marcel, Ponda in Goa, India. The temple is located at an elevation of 81 ft. Temple is known for the miracles of Water Goddess Mandodari and sacrifice made by the villagers. Water Goddess, Mandodari is the chief deity of the temple.

== Deity ==
This is a temple for Mandodari the gramadevata or the village deity of Betki. It is not a temple for Ravana's wife Mandodari.

Shree Mandodari Devasthan completed 102 years of its constitution in 2013 but is of far more ancient foundation.
