= Candola =

- Village
- Chapel of St. Cruz, Candola (1784) is the oldest structure in the village
- Interactive map of Candola
- Location in Goa, India Candola (India)
- Coordinates: 15.513936°N 73.967842°E
- Country: India
- State: Goa
- District: North Goa
- Sub-District: Ponda
- Established: 1784

Government
  - Type: Village Panchayat

Population (2011)
  - Total: 5,354
- Demonym(s): Candoli, Candolkar

Languages
  - Official: Konkani
  - Former Official: Portuguese
- Time zone: UTC+5:30 (IST)
- PIN: 403107
- Vehicle registration: GA
- Website: www.vpbetquicandola.com

Candola is a village and census town in Ponda Sub-District, North Goa district in the state of Goa, India. It is located in the Novas Conquistas region of the state.

== History ==
Candola was founded by the Portuguese, in 1783, after Raja Bahadur Khem Savant III from the Kingdom of Sawantwadi ceded its lands to Portugal, in order to receive military help against the Kingdom of Kolhapur.

== Geography ==
The Mandovi River flows to through village's East and North, separating it from the village of Amona. Another waterbody - the Cumbarjua Canal, which is a distributary of the Mandovi, flows on its North-Western border, separating it from the island of St Estevam. There is a bridge over River, connecting it to the inner parts of Goa, and another over the canal, connecting it to the island.
