= Conxem =

Village in Goa, India

Coordinates: 15°21′03″N 74°04′16″E

Conxem is a village in Ponda taluka (sub-district) of Goa, India.

== Area, population ==
As of 2001 India census, Conxem in Ponda taluka has an area of 188.19 hectares, a total of just 39 households, a population of 186 (comprising 94 males and 92 females) with an under-six years population of 24 (comprising 10 boys and 14 girls).

== Location ==
Conxem is located in the south-eastern part of Ponda taluka. Perhaps due to its small size, it is difficult to locate on the map of Ponda, but it is situated in the Betora-Nirancal area.

It lies approx 12.4 km from the sub-district (taluka) headquarters of Ponda town via the Rajiv Kala Mandir Road-Upper Bazar Rd, and approx 44.6 km away from the district North Goa headquarters of Panaji or Panjim.

== Local jurisdiction ==
Conxem lies under the Betora-Nirancal gram panchayat.

It falls under the Siroda Assembly Constituency for elections to the Goa Assembly.
