= Mandovi Bridge, Goa =

Bridge in India

Mandovi Bridge
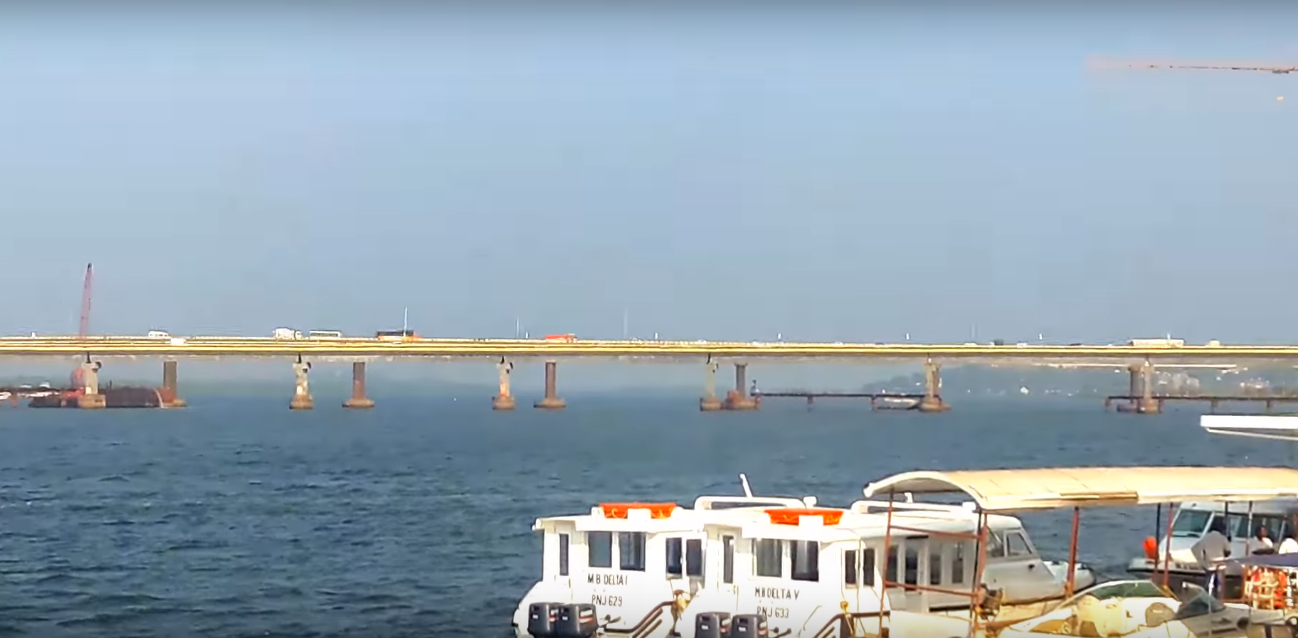
- Mandovi bridge as seen from Panaji jetty
- Coordinates: 15.505°N 73.837°E
- Carried: Four lanes of NH 66
- Crossed: Mandovi River

Characteristics
- Total length: 620 metres (2,030 ft) each
- Width: 21 metres (69 ft) each

History
- Opened: 1971 (first); 1998 (second); 2019 (Third)
- Rebuilt: 27 July 2014 (replaced)
- Collapsed: 5 July 1986 (rebuilt)

The Mandovi bridge is a set of two bridges. It carries four lanes over the Mandovi river. It was Russian in design and the first to be used in this country. The first Mandovi bridge was built in 1971 and the second one in 1998.

On 5 July 1986 the first bridge collapsed. After the collapse, this project required the dismantling of the old bridge structure and strengthening with by filling M20 concrete. The total cost of construction was ₹20 million (US$240,000). The parallel bridges have a length of 600 metres each.

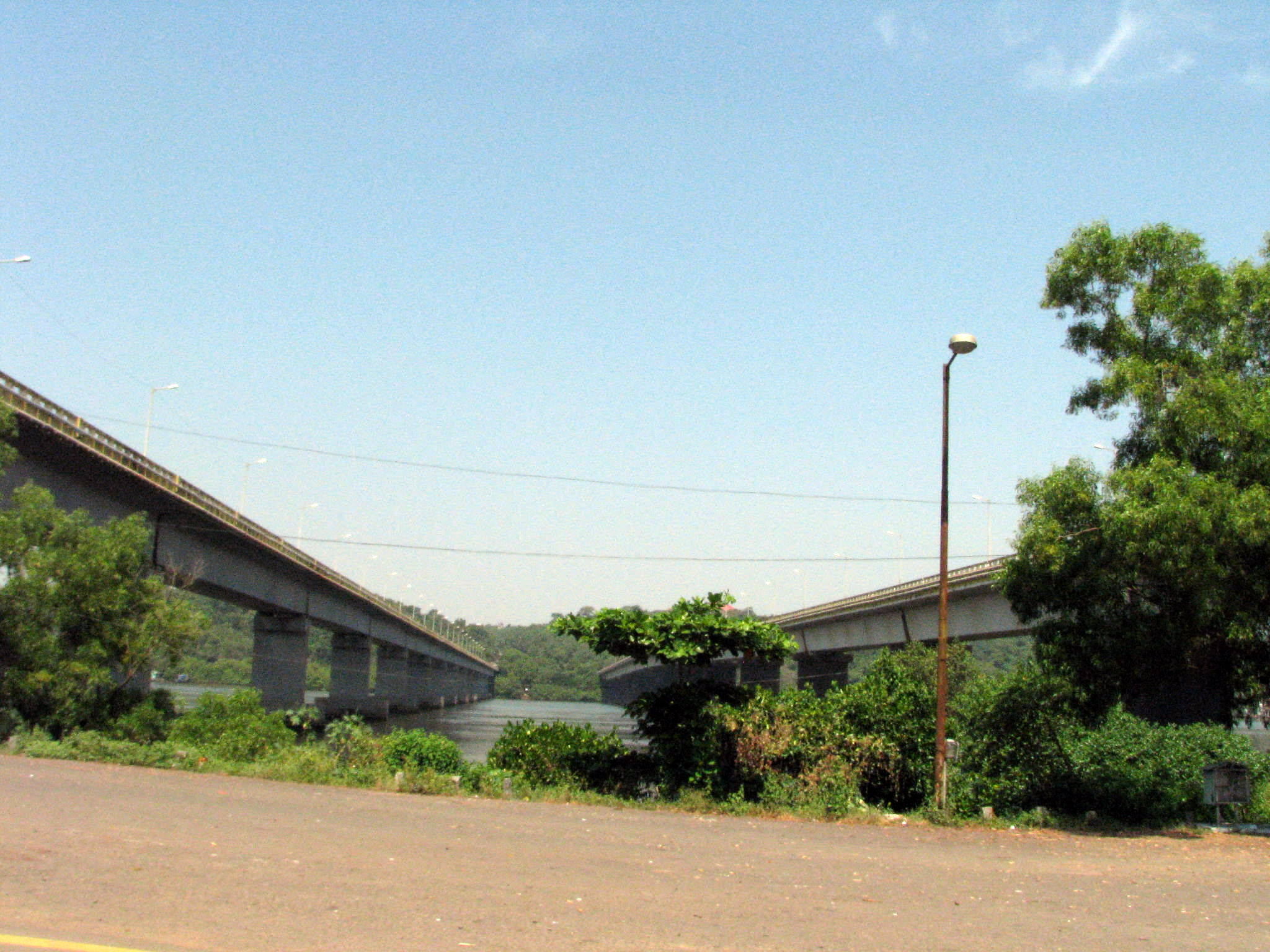
View of Mandovi Bridge from Panaji

== History ==
Spanning across the Mandovi River near Panaji are three parallel Mandovi Bridges. The older bridge collapsed in the 1980s before a new bridge was constructed to accommodate heavy transport vehicles. The Mandovi Bridge links the towns of Panaji to Porvorim. On 14 June 2014, the foundation stone for the third bridge, which is the largest bridge in Goa, was laid by Prime Minister Narendra Modi. It will span 5 kilometres (3.1 miles) and will be 15 metres (49 feet) higher than the existing bridges and will be spaced in between the two. The 3rd Mandovi bridge is named Atal Setu after former Prime Minister of India Atal Bihari Vajpayee. The bridge was inaugurated on 27 January 2019 at the hands of Union Roads Minister Nitin Gadkari, Goa CM Manohar Parrikar.

=== Collapse in 1986 ===
On 5 July 1986, the first Mandovi bridge collapsed. The main reason for failure was determined to be corrosion of the pre-stressed cable that attached the precast concrete segments to the piers. The debris of the bridge still remains in the river even after 30 years, it has seriously impacted the flow of the river.

== Mandovi River ==
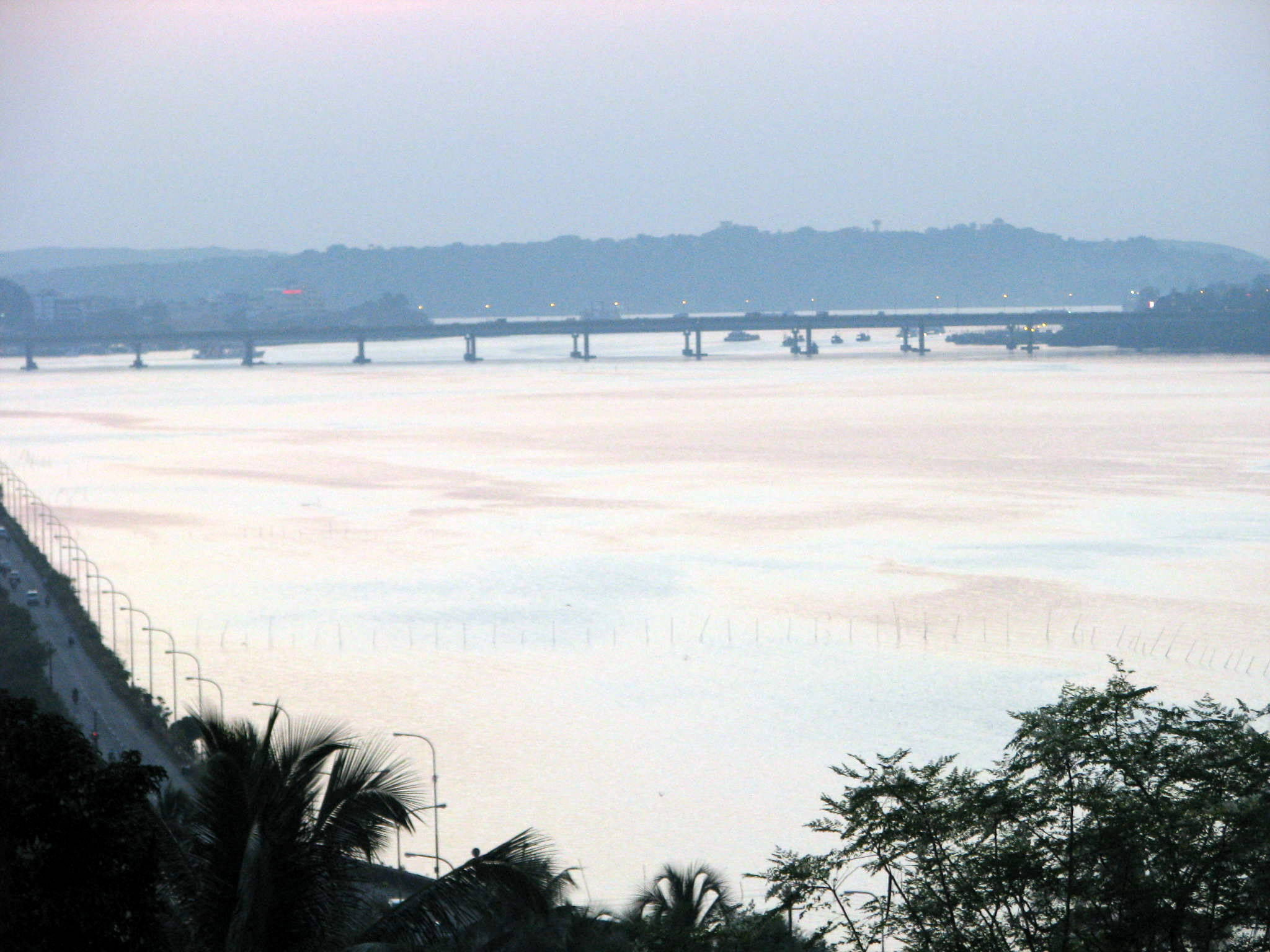
Mandovi Bridge from Ribandar

The Mahadayi/Mandovi River (Mandovi, pronounced [maːɳɖ(ɔ)wĩː]), also known as Mahadayi or Mhadei river, is described as the lifeline of the Indian state of Goa. The Mandovi and the Zuari are the two primary rivers in the state of Goa. Mandovi joins with the Zuari at a common creek at Cabo Aguada, forming the Mormugao harbour. Panaji, the state capital and Old Goa, the former capital of Goa, are both situated on the left bank of the Mandovi.

== The Third Mandovi Bridge ==
The Atal Setu, also known as the Third Mandovi Bridge or Atal Bridge, is a cable-stayed bridge in Goa that runs between Panaji and Porvorim. It carries the NH 66 over the tidal part of the Mandovi River. It has a total length of 5.1 kilometres (3.2 mi). It is the third longest cable-stayed bridge in India. Two wheelers, three wheelers and bullock carts are strictly prohibited from using the Atal Setu due to its height of 30 metres (98 ft). It opened on 5 February 2019.

== See also ==
- Atal Setu (Goa)
- Zuari Bridge
- Mandovi River
- Zuari River
