= Vagurbem =

Vagurbem (or Vagurme) is a village in the Ponda taluka (sub-district) of Goa, India.

== Area, population ==
According to the official 2011 Census, Vagurbem in Ponda taluka has an area of 358.87 hectares, a total of 116 households, and a population of 527 (comprising 272 males and 255 females) with an under-six years population of 57 (comprising 31 boys and 26 girls).

== Location ==
It lies approximately 9.2 km from the sub-district (taluka) headquarters of Ponda town, and approx 34.1 km away from the district North Goa headquarters of Panaji or Panjim (via Ponda-Apewal-Querim-Savoi Verem- Betqui-Marcela).

== Local jurisdiction ==
Vagurbem lies under the Vere-Vaghurme gram panchayat.
