= Velinga =

Coordinates: 15.431804474017062°N 73.97197620589226°E

- Village
- Interactive map of Velinga
- Country: India
- State: Goa
- District: South Goa
- Taluka: Ponda

Government
  - Body: Veling-Priol-Kunkoliem Village Panchayat

Area
  - Total: 315 ha (780 acres)

Population (2011)
  - Total: 1,921
- 444 households
- Time zone: UTC+5:30 (IST)

Velinga is a village in the North Goa sub-district (or taluka) of Ponda. It lies in the centre of Goa, in a setting amidst greenery and temples.

== Location code, size, population ==
It features under the location code number of 626854 in the official Indian Census of 2011. According to the Census details, Velinga has an area of 315.00 hectares, and a total number of 444 households comprising 1,921 persons (including 1,001 males and 920 females). Its under-six population is made up of 145 children, including 79 boys and 66 girls.
