= Vadi, Ponda =

Vadi is a village in the Ponda taluka (sub-district) of Goa.

== Area, population ==
According to the official 2011 Census, Vadi in Ponda taluka has an area of 161.01 hectares, a total of 110 households, a population of 506 (comprising 246 males and 260 females) with an under-six years population of 49 (comprising 27 boys and 22 girls). Its village code under the Indian census is 626,858.

== Location ==
It lies approximately 5.7 km from the sub-district (taluka) headquarters of Ponda town via the Ponda-Durbhat road, and approximately 35.4 km away from the district North Goa headquarters of Panaji or Panjim.

== Local jurisdiction ==
Vadi (or Wadi) falls under the Talaulim Grama panchayat or village council.
