= Vanxim =

Vanxim Ilha do Capão
- Island and Village
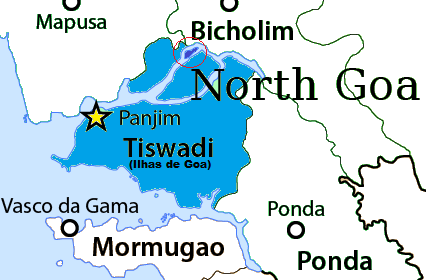
- Location of Vanxim (dark blue in red circle) in Ilhas de Goa (light blue)

- Location within Goa Location within India
- Coordinates: 15°32′43.6″N 73°54′44.3″E
- Country: India
- State: Goa
- District: North Goa
- Taluka: Ilhas

Government
  - Type: Panchayat of São Matias
- Elevation: 8 m (26 ft)

Population (2010)
  - Total: 550
- Time zone: UTC+5:30 (IST)
- Postcode: 403403
- Telephone Code: 0832

Vanxim or Capão is an island of Goa situated in the Ilhas region. It can be reached by ferry from Divar. The colonial name for Vanxim was Capão. The island has many houses with few villagers, many of whom are fisher-folk. Silveiras, Furtados, Vas, and Olivera are surnames of people there. Mahendra Gaunekar sold parts of the island to Ozone corporate. A luxury hotel and golf course were planned for the island but faced resistance from alert islanders and others.

It is the smallest of 6 major islands within the Mandovi, the others being:

- Ilhas de Goa,
- Chorão,
- Divar,
- Cumbarjua,
- St Estevam and
- Several other small mangrove islands and sand banks.

== Churches ==
=== Church of Santo Cristo ===
Church of Santo Cristo

There is also a church in the area known as the Church of Santo Cristo, built in 1879 AD. During the months of April and May the feasts of the Miraculous Chapel and Santo Cristo are celebrated.

=== Chapel of the Miraculous Cross ===
Chapel of the Miraculous Cross

An important landmark in Vanxim is the Chapel of the Miraculous Cross. It is well known in Goa as a lot of people from all over the state come here to make or fulfill vows.

=== River Crucifix ===
River Crucifix of Vanxim

Branching out of Mandovi as one goes across the Naroa, a Cross is visible in the midst of waters before approaching Vanxim. Constructed by the villagers, the Cross was in the memory of a doctor, Louis Cabral, who drowned at this point when his canoe capsized while he was on his way to see a patient in Vanxim Island.

== Cemeteries ==
=== Vanxim Cemetery ===
Vanxim Cemetery

It is located near the Church of Santo Cristo. Many simple graves can be found here. It houses an altar.

== See also ==
- São Matias, Goa
- Divar
- Chorão
