= Tivrem =

Village in Goa, India

Coordinates: 15°29′57″N 73°57′50″E

Tivrem is a village in the Ponda taluka (sub-district) of Goa, India.

== Area, population ==
As of 2011 India census, Tivrem in Ponda taluka has an area of 210 hectares, a total of 454 households, a population of 1,878 (comprising 960 males and 918 females) with an under-six years population of 156 (comprising 82 boys and 74 girls).

Its location code number as per the 2011 census is 626843.

== Location ==
Tivrem is located in the northern part of Ponda taluka. It is close to Corlim in Tiswadi taluka.

Tivrem lies approx 15.8 km from the sub-district (taluka) headquarters of Ponda town, and approx 19.6 km away from the district North Goa headquarters of Panaji or Panjim.

== Local jurisdiction ==
Tivrem lies under the Tivrem-Orgaon (Tivre-Orgao) gram panchayat.
