= Cuncoliem =

Village in Goa, India

Coordinates: 15.4614588097°N 73.975498738°E

Cuncoliem is a village in Ponda taluka, Goa, India.

== Village panchayat ==
Cuncoliem (also spelt Kunkoliem), shares a common village panchayat with Veling and Prior, two neighbouring villages. This is called the village panchayat of Veling-Priol-Kunkoliem. In July 2020, during the first phase of the Covid-19 pandemic, there was a controversy in the area over the housing of Covid patients.

== Area, population ==
In the 2011 Census, Cuncoliem was found to have an area of 517 hectares, with a total of 323 households, and a population of 1,385 persons, comprising 711 males and 674 females. The zero-to-six age group population comprised 134 children, of these 70 were males and 64 females.

== Priol assembly constituency ==
Cuncoliem, under the Veling-Priol-Cuncoliem village panchayat, is one of the seven panchayats that made up the Priol assembly segment of Goa. The other six panchayats included in this assembly constituency are Tivrem-Orgao, Betki-Khandola, Savoi-Verem, Bhoma-Adcolna, Keri and Volvoi.

== Comunidade ==
Cuncoliem also has a comunidade (also called a gaonkaria, earlier), which is a village land-holding community body. In October 2017, this was one of the 28 comunidades in Goa, to which the Goa government had appointed committees.

== Shrines ==
The Sri Gomantak Tirupati Balaji Devasthan is located at Cuncoliem, and has been described as being located in a bit of an "isolated place and not as frequented by devotees as compared to other nearby three temples at Priol like Mangueshi, Shanta Durga as well as Mahalsa Narayani". Shree Ganesha Purusha Temple Kunkoliem is also located in the area.

== PIN code ==
The Cuncoliem-Mardol Postal Index Number code is 403404.
