= Adcolna =

Village in Ponda, India

Coordinates: 15.489°N 73.966°E

Adcolna is a village in Ponda taluka, Goa, India.

It is part of the Bhoma-Adconla village panchayat.

In the 2011 Census, Adcolna was found to have an area of 210 hectares, with a total of 385 households, and a population of 1,688 persons, comprising 883 males and 805 females. The zero-to-six age group population comprised 188 children, of these 101 were males and 87 females.
