= Angelo da Fonseca =

Indian painter (1902–1967)

- Born: 1902; Santo Estêvão, Goa, Portuguese India, Portuguese Empire (now in India)
- Died: 1967 (aged 64–65); Poona, Maharashtra, India
- Occupation: Painter
- Spouse: Ivy Muriel Menezes
- Children: 1
- Website: angelofonseca.com

Angelo da Fonseca (1902–1967) was a 20th-century Indian painter.

== Early life ==
Angelo da Fonseca was born in Santo Estêvão, Goa in 1902 to a wealthy Goan Catholic family. He studied under Abanindranath Tagore in Calcutta. Fonseca was subsequently condemned by other Goan Catholics for his anti-Catholic paintings and he left Goa for Pune; he had repeatedly depicted the Virgin Mary as a Hindu woman wearing a sari and a bindi. His paintings have been displayed in major cities worldwide.

== Art studies ==
He started out in medical studies at the Grant Medical College, Bombay, but soon left for J. J. School of Art. He also left the prestigious art school in 1930, because he felt it had too much of a European setting, and joined Shantiniketan in Calcutta where he was trained by Rabindranath Tagore in the Bengal School of Art. Nandalal Bose was his teacher. Since he was a Christian, many of his paintings were based on Christian themes from the Bible.

== Paintings ==
Fonseca was a prolific and versatile painter. He carved on wood and slate, illustrated scrolls, assembled stained glass, etched wax drawings, made pencil sketches, and decorated baked clay. He created over 1000 watercolours, murals and oil paintings in places such as St. Xavier's College, Mumbai; Jnana Deepa, Institute of Philosophy and Theology in Pune; Rachol Seminary in Goa, etc. He was reportedly strongly influenced by the writings of Henry Heras, S.J., who encouraged Indian Christian artists to paint local Hindu themes rather than traditional Christian ones.

== Goa ==
He returned to Goa in 1931. Goa was then ruled by Portugal. Fonseca faced severe criticism from both Portuguese and Goan Catholics for painting Christian themes with Hindu settings. He was criticized by the Parish Priest in his native village of Santo Estêvão, because he had painted the Virgin Mary as a Hindu woman in a sari with a bindi. He eventually left Goa permanently.

== Pune ==
Fonseca moved to Pune (then called Poona) in 1931, practicing his art at the Anglican Christa Prema Seva Ashram where he created many works. He married Ivy Muriel Menezes in 1951, their daughter Yessonda Dalton was born in 1957.

He died in 1967 of meningitis. Ivy Muriel died in September 2015 in Pune.
