= Gangem =

Gangem is a village in the newly formed taluka (sub-district) of Ponda in Goa. Although its under the Ponda taluka and administrative jurisdiction, the assembly constituency is Valpoi from 2011

== Area, population ==
According to the official 2011 Census, Gangem has an area of 544.05 hectares, a total of 112 households, a population of 473 (comprising 251 males and 222 females) with an under-six years population of 50 (comprising 26 boys and 24 girls).

== Location ==
Gangem is located in the north eastern end of ponda taluka. It is to the north of Usgao-Tisk.

It lies approx 44.7 km away from the district North Goa headquarters of Panaji or Panjim.

== Local jurisdiction ==
Gangem lies under the Usgao Ganjem gram panchayat.
