= Mahalasa Narayani Temple, Mardol =

Hindu temple in Goa, India

Coordinates: 15.441°N 73.973°E

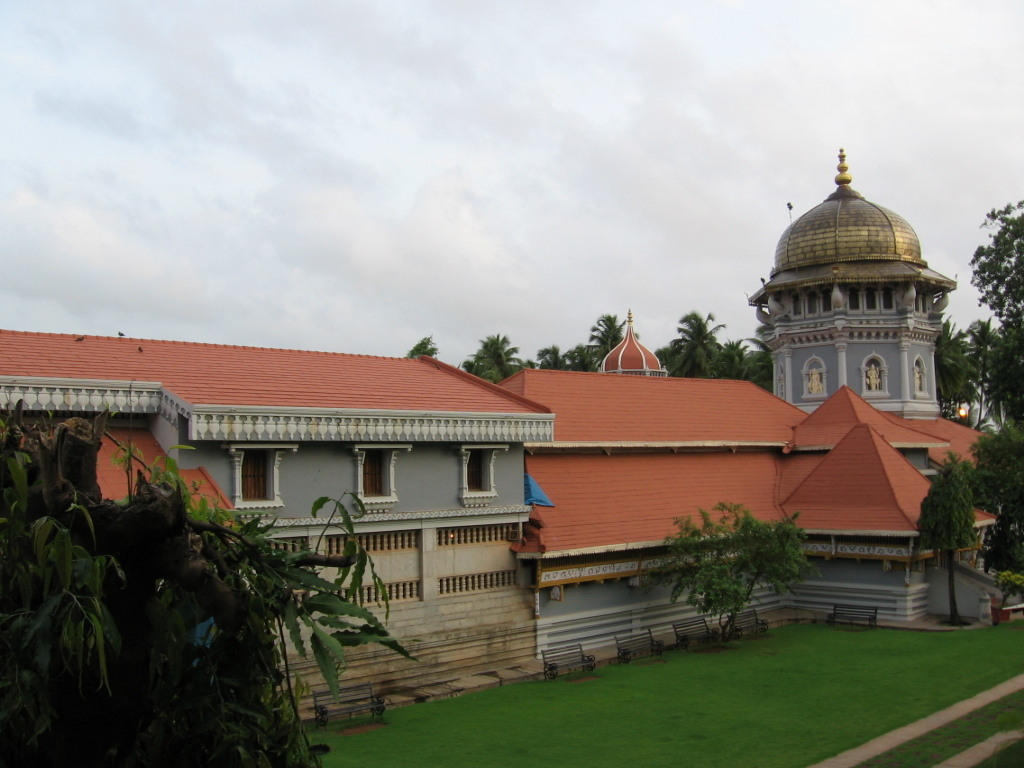
Mahalasa Temple

Mahalasa Narayani Temple is a Hindu temple dedicated to the goddess Mohini as Mahalasa, located in Mardol, Ponda, in the Indian state of Goa.

== Presiding goddess ==
Mahalasa is identified with Mohini, the female avatar of the god Vishnu. Mahalasa has four hands, carrying a Trishula, a sword, a severed head, and a drinking bowl. She stands on a prostrate man or demon, as a tiger or lion licks blood dripping from the severed head. She also wears the yajnopavita (sacred thread), which is generally dedicated on male deities. She stands on a prostrate man or demon, as a tiger or lion licks blood dripping from the severed head. Goud Saraswat Brahmins as well as Vaishnavas from Goa and South Canara identify her with Mohini and call her Narayani and Rahu-matthani, the slayer of Rahu, as told in the Bhavishya Purana.

While in this shrine, Mahalasa is associated with Mohini and Vishnu, in the Khandoba cult, she is regarded as a form of goddess Parvati and wife of Khandoba, a form of Shiva (Parvati's husband).

== History ==
Mahalsa's older temple in Old Mardol or Velham or Verna, Salcette was destroyed by the Portuguese in 1567, though the icon of the Mahalasa was rescued. It was shifted here from Velham to avoid destruction during the forcible Christianization of Salcette. When the current temple in Mardol (which was outside Portuguese control) was built in the 17th century, the icon was reconsecrated.

The icon's history before Verna is blurry. Some believe that the main temple of Mahalasa was originally located in Nepal. She was moved to Aurangabad in Maharashtra. During the Mughal domination, Aurangabad fell under the Muslim rule and the icon was moved to a secret location in Goa. Later, a small temple was built at Verna.

== Architecture ==
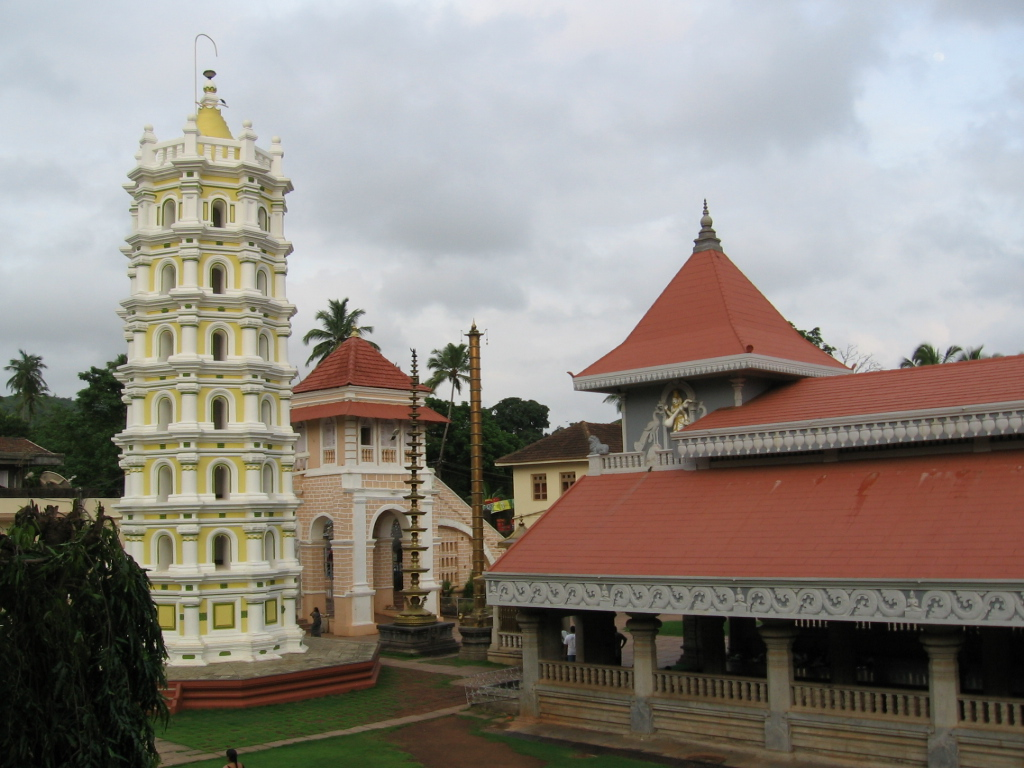
Entrance, Samai and Deepastambha

The Mardol temple complex also has smaller temples of the goddess Shantadurga (Santeri) and Lakshmi Narayan (Vishnu with his consort Lakshmi), who are worshipped daily with Mahalasa. The shrines for five main ganas (attendants) of Mahalasa, namely Grampurush, Bhagwati, Dadh, Simha Purush and Mhal Purush, are also located within the temple premises. Daily worship of all these deities is carried out before worshipping the main goddess.

The temple has canteen which is run by the workers. After the morning and evening aarti the Prasad- the holy meal is served here.

The temple is famous in Goa for its huge brass bell. The bell does not have a ringer. The ringer was attached only when somebody wanted to testify. It was believed that the goddess will punish the person by killing the person in three days who lied while ringing the bell. The belief was so strong that during the Portuguese rule the testimony in the temple was considered acceptable in the court of law. It is also famous for its Brass Divli/Samai (oil lamp).

== Rituals and festivals ==
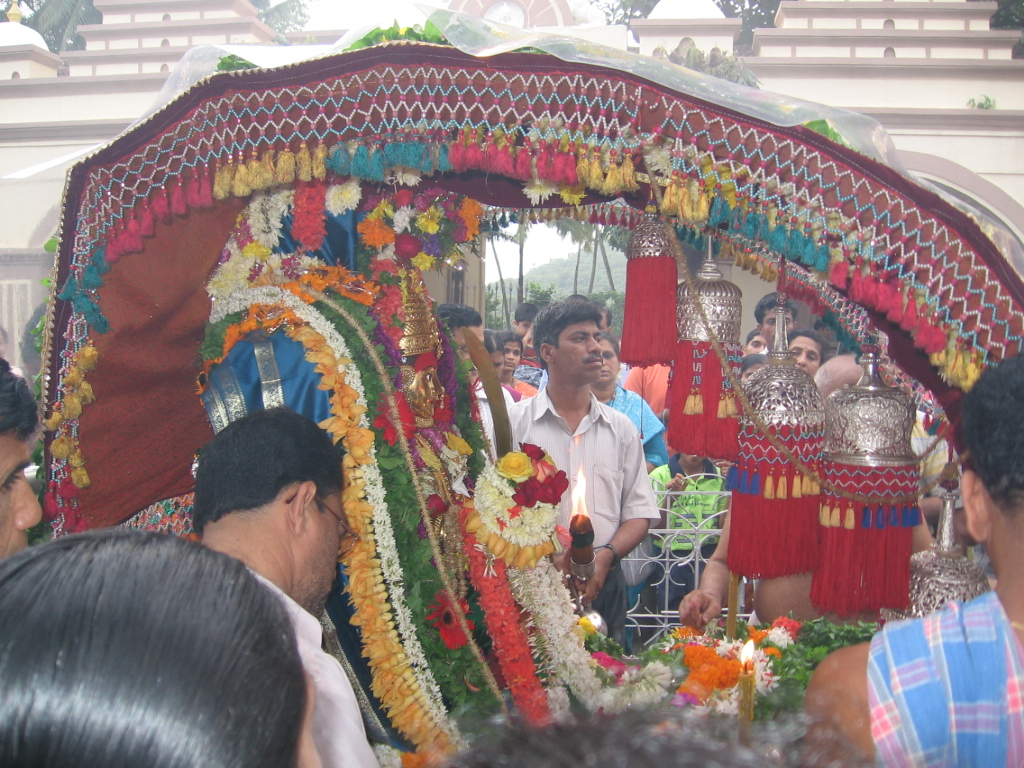
Palakhi on Sunday

Mahalasa is considered as both female (as Mohini) and male (as a form of Vishnu). She is dressed in alankar (ornaments, costume) as various Vishnu-related deities at various days in the year. She is dressed as Vishnu's wife Lakshmi as well as Vishnu's male forms like Rama, Krishna (Bala Krishna - infant Krishna, Krishna killing Kaliya), Vithoba, Venkateswara etc.

Generally, the male or main deity accompanies the right hand position (considered superior to the left). However, in joint processions or functions, Shantadurga is given the right hand seat, while Mahalasa sits on her left, as per the lore that Mahalasa gave the former the honour.

Sunday holds a special significance for the temple and the presiding goddess. On this day, Palakhi Seva is performed in addition to other rituals. The goddess is taken out for a ride around the temple in a palanquin (palakhi). The palanquin is decked up with flowers and traditional colourful decorations. A large crowd gathers to participate in the event and the devotees sing her praises.

The Magha Jatra (festival) at the temple and Navaratri (festival dedicated to the Hindu goddess) are the main annual temple celebrations.

In 2011, the temple banned entry of foreigners into the temple citing objectionable dressing and conduct as the reason.
