= Mardol, Goa =

Mardol Mhardol
- Town
- Location in Goa, India Mardol (India)
- Coordinates: 15.433°N 73.95°E
- Country: India
- State: Goa
- District: North Goa
- Demonym: Mhardolkar

Languages
  - Official: Konkani
- Time zone: UTC+5:30 (IST)
- Vehicle registration: GA
- Website: goa.gov.in

Mardol is a census town in Ponda taluka, North Goa district in the state of Goa, India.

The Marathi and Portuguese languages radio playwright and short-story writer Ananta Rau Sar Dessai lived and practiced medicine in Mardol. Mardol is a fast-growing town in Goa. Mardol and Mangueshi are twin towns. The late Vasantrao Velingkar, the first MLA of Marcaim, who sacrificed his post for Dayanand Bandodkar, who became Chief Minister, lived in Mardol. Mardol has a football team playing in the Third Division in Goa.

== Main attraction ==
The Mahalasa Narayani Temple, dedicated to the goddess Mahalasa(Supreme Lord Vishnu’s avatar (incarnation)) is located at Mardol in Ponda is one of the most famous temples in Goa.

== Transport ==
Panaji is 21 kilometers from Mardol and Ponda is 9.2 kilometers away. Many inter-state government run and privately operated buses travel through Mardol.Nearby travelling villages are Kunkolim, Veling, Priol.
