= Nagueshi =

Hindu temple in Goa, India

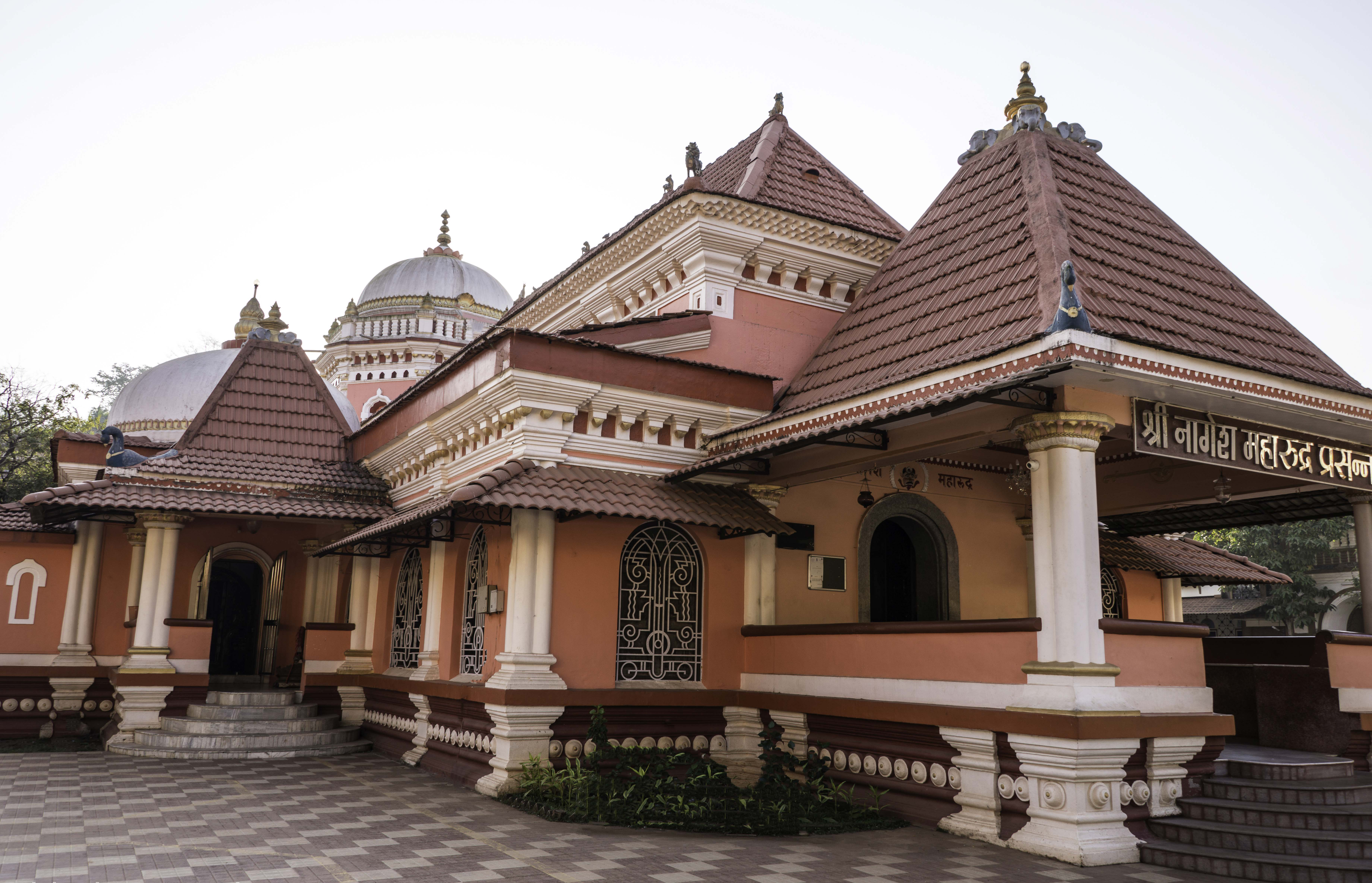
- Nagueshi Temple

Religion
- Affiliation: Hinduism
- District: South Goa district
- Deity: Shiva

Location
- Location: Ponda taluka
- State: Goa
- Country: India
- Interactive map of Nagueshi
- Coordinates: 15.4074694°N 73.9837419°E

Website
- www.shreenagesh.org

Shree Nagesh Devasthan, also known as Nagueshi, is a prominent Hindu temple located in the Antruz (Ponda) region of Goa. Dedicated to Lord Shiva in his self-manifested (svayambhu) form as Shree Nagesh Maharudra, the site is recognized as an ancient and spiritually active place of worship. The temple is situated approximately 800 meters from Farmagudi along the Farmagudi–Kavlem–Ponda road, and is about 4 kilometers away from the Ponda bus stand.

Nagesh is a form of the Hindu god Shiva worshipped by Konkani Hindus of the Gaud Saraswat Brahmin community in India. The temple lies in verdant surroundings in the South Goa district of Goa. Unlike many other Hindu temples of Goa which were shifted out of the Velha Conquistas the Nagueshi Temple is at its original place. It has, however, been renovated a number of times. It is located in Bandode village, Ponda, North Goa district.

Within the temple precincts is a tali or water reservoir surrounded by palms. The reservoir is built so that standing at a certain location around the tali, a person can view the reflection of the idol of Naguesh and the lighted lamps in the inner sanctum.

The temple has recently banned entry of foreigners into the temple citing objectionable dressing and conduct as the reason.

== History ==
According to traditional accounts recorded in the Sahyadri Khanda, the installation of the Shivalinga dates back to antiquity, coinciding with the era when Parashurama brought and settled the Dashagotri Saraswat clans along with their family deities in Goa.

Historical details regarding the antiquity of the temple complex are preserved through several epigraphical records:

- An inscription positioned in front of the temple provides details about its early history. It records that during the reign of King Veera Pratap Devaraya Maharaya of the Vijayanagara Empire in 1413 AD (Shaka 1335), while Nanjan Gosavi was serving as the governor of Gomantak, an individual named Mai Shenvi Wagle gifted lands to the deities Shree Nagesh and Shree Mahalakshmi. These donations included the Veda Khandika plantation (kulagar), the Nagzari Malo agricultural field, and the Ruvi plantation located at Golti Wada.
- A copper plate inscription discovered in Savoi-Verem dating back to 1222 AD explicitly references the deity as "Shree Nagnath" of Bandivade village.
- While the Vijayanagara epigraph establishes that the temple was located in Bandivade by 1413 AD, the Savoi-Verem inscription traces the historical evidence of the shrine further back to the Yadava period, specifically around 1299–1300 AD.

Based on these combined historical evidences, experts deduce that the Nagesh temple likely existed prior to the 7th century.

== Architecture and design ==
The temple houses notable ancient stone sculptures, including an idol of Shiva-Parvati that experts estimate to originate from the 7th century, as well as a highly ancient idol of Ganesha dating back to the 8th century.

The main temple building underwent a comprehensive renovation in 1780 AD (Shaka 1702). Pilgrim rest houses (agarsalis) were built around the temple perimeter in 1781 AD (Shaka 1703), and all three of these structures were later renovated in 1877 AD. Although historical inscriptions mention the presence of an ancient lamp tower (deepastambha), it had disappeared in modern times; a new lamp tower has since been constructed on the left side of the temple. The surrounding premises have also been updated with modern, functional infrastructure to accommodate visitors.

Geographically, the temple is surrounded on three sides by mountain ranges, giving the area a cool and scenic atmosphere. The adjacent hills feature numerous fresh, sweet-water springs alongside betel nut (supari) plantations.

The main shrine is oriented toward the west. Within the inner sanctum (garbhagudi), the Shivalinga rests upon a pedestal (pidika) beneath an overhead ceremonial canopy (meghadambari). Directly in front of the temple is a water tank (tali). A distinct architectural characteristic of this tank is that the reflection of the Nagesh idol from the inner sanctum, along with the surrounding row of decorative lamps (deep-ratna), can be seen mirrored in the water. This visual phenomenon appears with varying clarity between the Hindu months of Shravan and Ashwin, showcasing the advanced creativity and skill of the original builders.

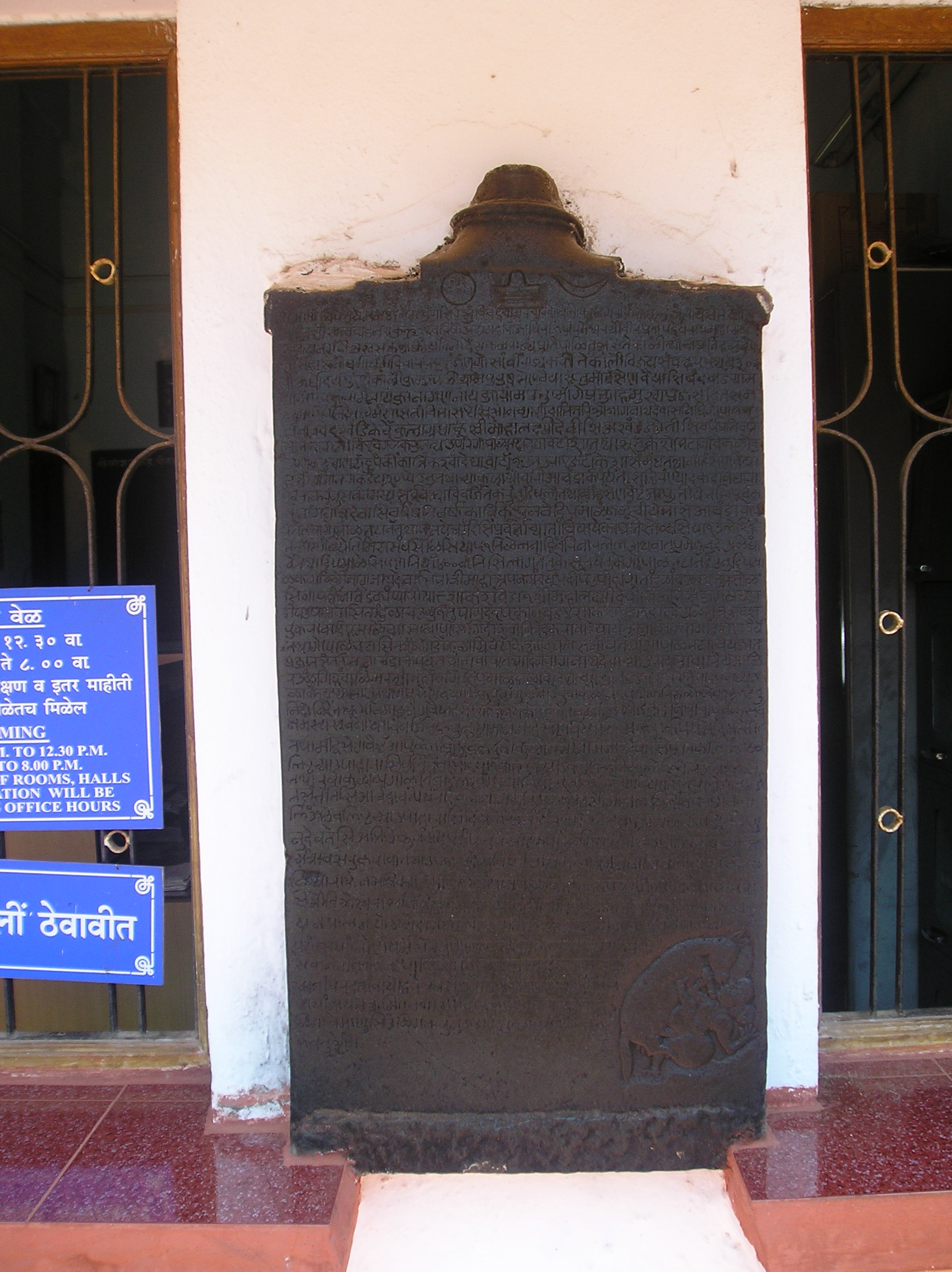
Inscription with 'Maee Shenvi' of 1413AD, Nagueshi, Goa.

A 1413 AD stone inscription in the Nagueshi Temple in Ponda speaks of Purush Shennvi's son Maee Shennvi of Kullalogram (cuncolim/Kuncoliem) being granted the village of Bandode (Bandivade) to carry out the rituals of Naguesh and Mahalakshmi temples.

== Administration ==
The temple's traditional founders and family patrons (kulavi mahajans) belong to specific families of the Gaud Saraswat Brahmin community from the Kaushik, Vatsa, and Bharadwaj gotras. Shree Nagesh serves as their family deity (kuldaivat).

== Festivals ==
The temple hosts several public and religious festivals throughout the year:

- Visit of Goddess Mahalakshmi: Every year on the day of Ashadha Shukla Dashami, the goddess Shree Mahalakshmi Devi visits the Shree Nagesh temple.
- Mahaparvani Mahotsav: The primary annual festival of the temple is celebrated on Chaitra Shukla Purnima (the 15th day). The festival culminates at dawn on the following day, Chaitra Vadya Pratipada, with a grand chariot procession (maharatha).
- Other observances: Community-wide celebrations, including Navratri and Bhajani Saptah (devotional singing weeks), are conducted regularly across the year.

== Gallery ==
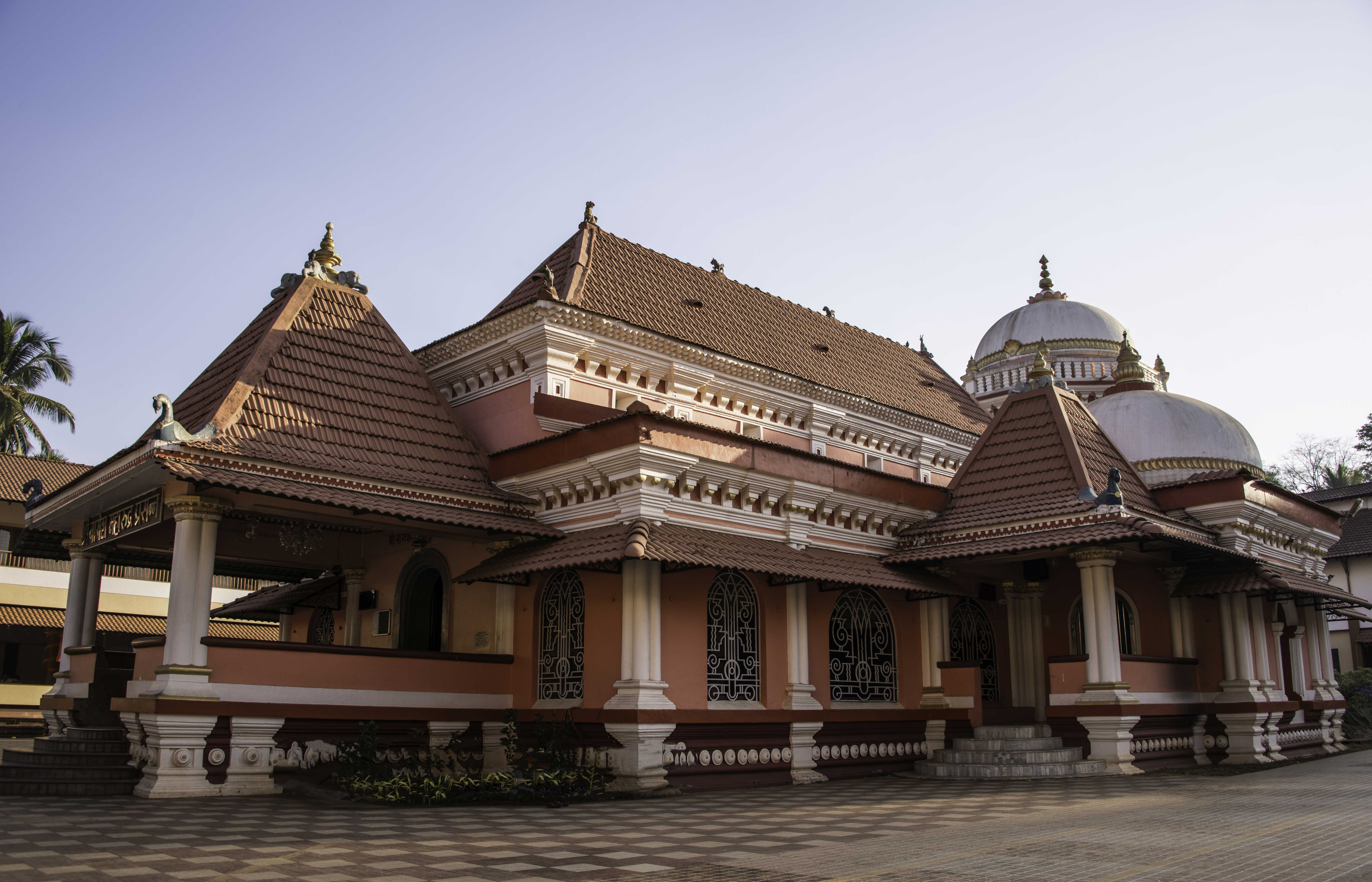
Side view of temple

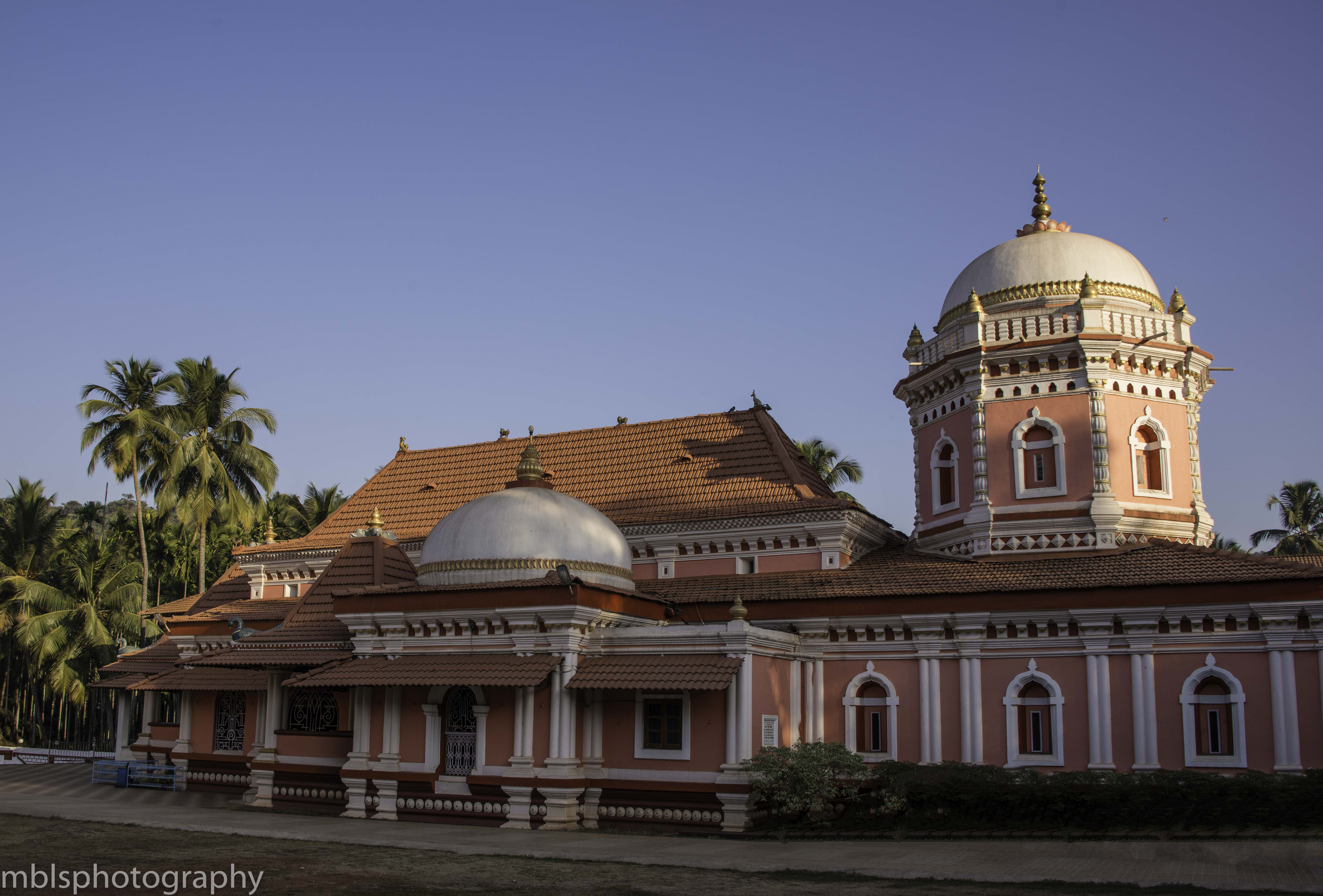
View from the rear of temple

== See also ==
- Mahalakshmi Temple
- Shenoy
- Goud Saraswat Brahmin
- Mangueshi Temple
- Ramnathi
- Shri Damodar Sansthaan, Goa
- Goa
- 17th-century Western domes
