= Telaulim =

Village in Goa, India

Coordinates: 15°15′N 73°57′E

Telaulim (or Talaulim) is a village in the Ponda taluka (sub-district) of Goa.

== Area, population ==
As of 2001 India census,,, Telaulim in Ponda taluka has an area of 246 hectares, a total of 604 households, a population of 2,554 (comprising 1,289 males and 1.265 females) with an under-six years population of 202 (comprising 101 boys and 101 girls).

== Location ==
It lies approx 5.2 km (via the Durbhat Road) from the sub-district (taluka) headquarters of Ponda town, and approx 34.9 km away from the district North Goa headquarters of Panaji or Panjim.

== Local jurisdiction ==
Telaulim (Talaulim) lies under the Wadi-Talaulim gram panchayat.
