= Orgao =

- Census Town
- Location in Goa, India
- Coordinates: 15°30′33″N 73°57′42″E
- Country: India
- State: Goa
- District: North Goa
- Taluka: Ponda

Area
  - Total: 3.50 km^{2} (1.35 sq mi)

Population (2011)
  - Total: 4,602
  - Density: 1,310/km^{2} (3,410/sq mi)

Languages
  - Official: Konkani
- Time zone: UTC+5:30 (IST)
- Postal Index Number: 403401
- Vehicle registration: GA
- Literacy: 92.27%
- Lok Sabha constituency: North Goa
- Vidhan Sabha constituency: Mormugao

Orgao is a village in Ponda taluka, North Goa district in the Indian state of Goa.

For the purposes of the census, it is considered a "Census Town". It is however part of the Orgao-Tivrem Village Panchayat.

As of the 2011 census, Orgao was found to have an area of 3.50 square kilometres, with a total of 1,156 households, and a population of 4,602 persons, comprising 2,264 males and 2,338 females. The zero-to-six age group population comprised 383 children, of these 207 were males and 176 females.
