= Cumbarjua =

- Island
- Location within Goa Location within India
- Coordinates: 15°30′56.0″N 73°56′48.1″E
- Country: India
- State: Goa
- District: North Goa
- Sub District: Ilhas
- Established: 1500s
- Elevation: 8 m (26 ft)

Population
  - Total: approx. 10,000s
- Demonym: Cumbarjuecar
- Time zone: UTC+5:30 (IST)
- Postcode: 403107
- Area code: 08343

Cumbarjua, is an island and town within the Mandovi River in Goa. It is situated to the east of Goa's capital Panjim at a distance of 20 kilometres. It is one of 6 major islands between the Mandovi and Zuari, the others being:

- Ilhas de Goa,
- Chorão,
- Divar,
- St Estevam,
- Vanxim and
- Several other small mangrove islands and sand banks.

== History ==
Earlier known as Kumbharjuve and Kumara-dwipa, the island hosted the capital of the Maurya dynasty of Konkan during the 6th-7th century.

Cumbarjua's history dates back to the early 15th century. On the west was Gandaulim which marked the fortified border of the Portuguese-ruled Goa island within Ilhas de Goa, and on the east was Marcel, which demarcated the end of the Bijapur's Adil Shah kingdom. Sandwiched between the two warring powers, the island, which was considered as no man's land was often used as a launching pad for attacks on each other by the two aggressors. Later, attempts were also made to capture it and it continued to bear the brunt and scars of these battles. On 25 November 1510, the Cumbarjua island was annexed by the Portuguese from the Muslim king Adil Shah.

After Cumbarjua was captured, the Portuguese began to develop it and the then Governor Diogo Lopes de Sequeira in 1545 handed it over to a Catholic priest Fr. George Dias Cabral, for three generations, with the condition that one-tenth of the produce were to be given to the government in the name of God annually.

In the 19th century, Cumbarjua was divided into four pieces and sold. Out of that sale, one piece was bought by the rich Shenvi Kenkre family. Another portion of the less populated was bought by one Peres. Later circumstances forced them to sell it. Shenvi Kenkre's land was later donated to Shree Mangueshi Devasthan, Priol. Peres’ property was sold to the Naique family. After the sale and change of ownership, the Mangueshi temple committee imposed heavy taxes on the residents of the island. This made people, who could not afford to pay the taxes, move to Gaudalim. The temple used to collect taxes from all houses, both Hindu as well as Catholic, but if one would pay a 20-year tax in advance it was considered as life-time tax.

Besides the Kenkres and the Peres’, Pratap Rao Sardessai, Shenvi Dhume, Bhandari, Prabhu Lawande were the Hindu landlords and the de Sa's, Alvare's and de Sousa's were the prominent Catholic landlords.

Marcel and Cumbarjua have long hosted the Sangodd, a water parade that features floats created by tying two boats to each other. These floats feature scenes from Hindu mythology.

== Demographics ==
In an area admeasuring 2,401,550 sq. metres, living in perfect harmony is a population of approximately 7,144 Cumbarjuecar; out of which 85 per cent are Hindus and the rest Catholics; all peacefully settled in Talapwada, Surchem Bhat (which got its name from the whispering palms near the river), Golwada, Takwada, Khadap Wada, Rambhuvan Wada, Mollo wada, Gavant and Thapan wada. According to historian Vinayak Narayan Shenvi Dhume, in 1770, Cumbarjua was made up of 486 houses (400 Hindus + 86 Catholics). The Hindu families comprised Goud Saraswat caste of Smarth and Vaishnau, Daivajnas, blacksmiths, carpenters, Kunbis, Gaudas, potters, washermen, fishermen and cobblers. Of the 86 Catholic families, ten were those of washermen and five of potters. Muslims were a skeletal few.

== Government and politics ==
Cumbarjua is part of Cumbarjua (Goa Assembly constituency) and North Goa (Lok Sabha constituency).

== Attractions ==
Cumbarjua is mainly known for its crocodile sightings, and as a habitat of the Indian mugger crocodile. The island is also known for the festival of Shantadurga Kumbharjuvekarin Devi Shishirotsav, which signifies the arrival of goddess Shantadurga Kumbharjuvekarin back to her home. Cumbarjua is also famous for its annual sangodd (boat festival), which is celebrated on the seventh day of Ganesh Chaturthi.
