= Marcel, Goa =

Mashel Marcela, Marcel
- Village
- Location in Goa, India Mashel (India)
- Coordinates: 15.514112°N 73.959618°E
- Country: India
- State: Goa
- District: North Goa
- Sub-District: Ponda
- Established: 1783
- Demonym(s): Marcelar, Marcelkar

Languages
  - Official: Konkani
  - Former Official: Portuguese

Languages
- Time zone: UTC+5:30 (IST)
- PIN: 403107
- Vehicle registration: GA
- Website: goa.gov.in

Marcel, also known as Mashel, is a village-turned-census town in the Ponda Sub-District, North Goa in the state of Goa, India. It is located in the Novas Conquistas region of the state.

== History ==
Marcel was founded by the Portuguese, in 1783, after Raja Bahadur Khem Savant III from the Kingdom of Sawantwadi ceded its lands to Portugal, in order to receive military help against the Kingdom of Kolhapur.

== Culture ==
Marcel and the island of Cumbharjua have long hosted the Sangodd, a water parade that features floats created by tying two boats to each other. These floats feature scenes from Hindu mythology.

== Transport ==
The bus stand of the Kadamba Transport Corporation in the village has largely been unused, due to multiple issues. Marcel is home to the Government College of Arts, Science and Commerce, Candola.
