= St Estevam =

Santo Estevam Santo Estêvão Juvem or Juá
- Island
- Location within Goa Location within India
- Coordinates: 15°31′48.2″N 73°56′28.0″E
- Country: India
- State: Goa
- District: North Goa
- Taluka: Ilhas
- Named for: Saint Stephen

Government
  - Type: Panchayat

Area
  - Total: 8.2 km^{2} (3.2 sq mi)
- Elevation: 8 m (26 ft)

Population
  - Total: 4,122
  - Density: 500/km^{2} (1,300/sq mi)
- Time zone: UTC+5:30 (IST)
- Postcode: 403106
- Telephone Code: 0832

St Estevam (Santo Estêvão) is an estuarine islet in the Tiswadi taluka, Goa state, India. St Estevam is commonly referred as Jūvã (Isle) and has earned the monicker Šākêchô Jūvõ—the island of vegetables—famed for its long, seven-ridged, light green ladyfingers. Therefore, the people of Jūvã came to be nicknamed bhennddem. The island is named after St. Stephen. It is one of Goa's most prosperous villages, often quoted by ex-Chief Minister Pratapsingh Rane for having a high per capita income.

It is the smallest of six major islands within the Mandovi, the others being:

- Ilha de Goa
- Chorão
- Divar
- Cumbarjua
- Vanxim
- Several other small mangrove islets and sand banks.

== History ==
The villagers of this island were originally Hindus, until the Jesuits began converting them to Christianity in the 1550s. Sampur Santu, a gaonkar (villager) was one of the first to be converted in 1555.

Tolto, a smaller island, was a home to a passage connecting to Dauji, in Old Goa. It was called Ramachi Tar. Tolto was also home to nine houses of the Portuguese aristocracy (fidalgos) from the 16th to the 18th centuries.

The model of the dwelling structures here involves rows of houses sharing walls and roofs. This is part of a tradition, which helped villagers seek help when attacked by Marathas.

The villagers were known as tarvotti (seafarers). While the Portuguese wooden ships were fixed at the Cumbharjua canal, villagers of St Estevam would be recruited to substitute for those who had died on these ships due to scurvy.

Dedicated to the Sacred Heart of Jesus, a monument was unveiled on a hillock on the island, on 26 December 1926. Some people erroneously refer to it as the statue of Christ the King. It was brought from Rome by Fr. Antonio Leandro da Rosa. Another monument, dedicated to the Sacred Heart of Mary, lies in the compound of the St. Stephen Church and was inaugurated on 31 December 1943.

St. Stephen's feast is celebrated on 26 December every year at the church dedicated to him. Saint Stephen is referred to as a Protomartyr of Christianity, and his name is derived from the Greek word "stephanos", which means wreath or crown.

=== Santo Estevao Church ===
After the conversion of all the villagers to Christianity, the Jesuits built the church in 1575 on the site of the Ravalnath temple. The church was dedicated to St. Stephen (Santo Estevão).

On 25 November 1683, the village was ransacked by Sambhaji, as part of the Maratha campaign against the Portuguese, and the church was burnt down by the Marathas. It was rebuilt by the Jesuits, only to be burned down again in 1739 by the Marathas. The present structure was erected in 1759, by the comunidade and a villager named Gelasio dos Remedios Furtado.

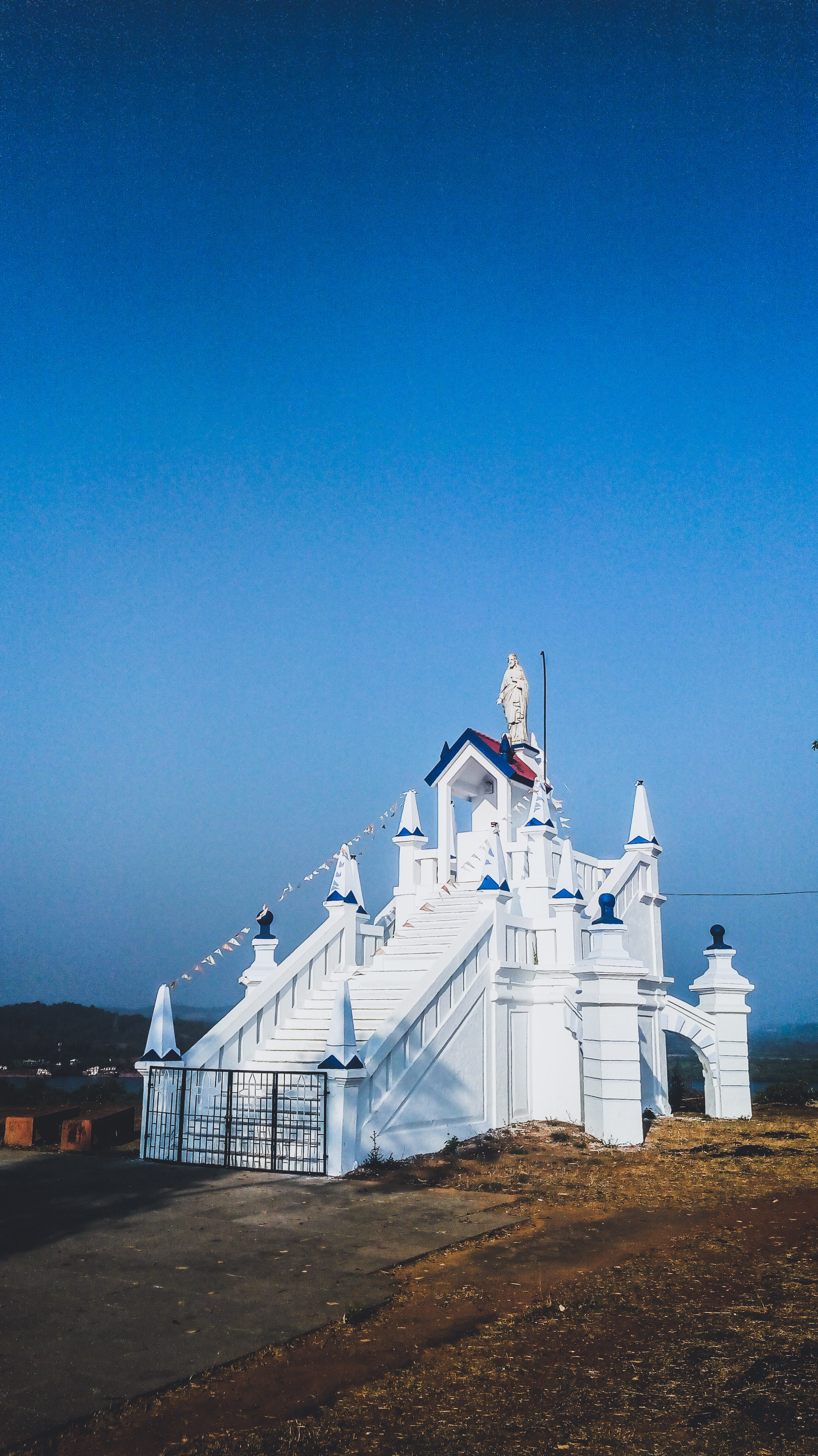
Sacred Heart of Jesus monument

The church is one of the largest churches present in Goa. Its exterior is like that of a false dome near twin towers adorned with lanterns. It is constructed with Corinthian, Rococo, Baroque, Romanesque and Greco-Roman influences. It has a nave ceiling (that has been decorated with floral graffiti), a pulpit and side altars. The church's main altar is dedicated to the protomartyr, St. Stephen. His statue is erected under a canopy of four pillars.

The church has seven side chapels. One of its altars has been dedicated to Our Lady of Remedios, while another features the Crucified Christ. One particular altar features Nossa Senhora de Boas Venturas, and this was previously at the nearby Tolto church. The church has a statue of St. Dominic, which was brought from Convent of St. Dominic in Old Goa. The church was robbed on 24 March 1890.

== Demographics ==
According to the 2011 Census, St. Estevam has a population of about 5,000, with 2% belonging to Scheduled Tribes and 1% to Scheduled Castes. About 35% of the population belongs to the working class. More than 90% of the population is literate, while close to 80% of the residents are Catholic.

== Community initiative ==
In 2018, villagers decided to work together to recultivate 50 acres of the village's barren land under the banner of the Illha Verde Farmers Club. Two varieties of seeds, Goa Rice Selection 1 (GRS1) and Jyothi were sown before June. Cameris and manai (traditional female and male tillers, respectively) from nearby mining affected villages were given employment. The government provided subsidies throughout the farming process.

== Attractions ==
- Chapel of Our Lady of Boaventura: Located at Tolto, it was once the parish church. Over 450 years old, it is the oldest in the village.
- Chapel of St Anne: Located at Mangueiral vaddo, it was constructed by Ligorio Simpliciano Fulgencio Pereira and Apolonia Visitacao de Siqueira, his wife. It is over a hundred years old.
- Fort of Santo Estêvão (also known as Fort of St Francis Xavier)
- Cupantli Manos (sluice gate)
- Casa do Povo de Santo Estêvão: A complex that houses many offices such as the post office and rural health centre

== Notable residents ==
- Angelo da Fonseca, an Indian artist, was born in St Estevam in 1902. Having studied under Abanindranath Tagore in Kolkata, he was criticized by both Portuguese and Goan Catholics for his paintings. This caused him to leave Goa permanently for Pune.

== See also ==
- Divar
- Chorão
- Vanxim
- Velha Goa
- Cumbarjua
