= Zuari River =

River in India

Coordinates: 15°25′N 73°54′E

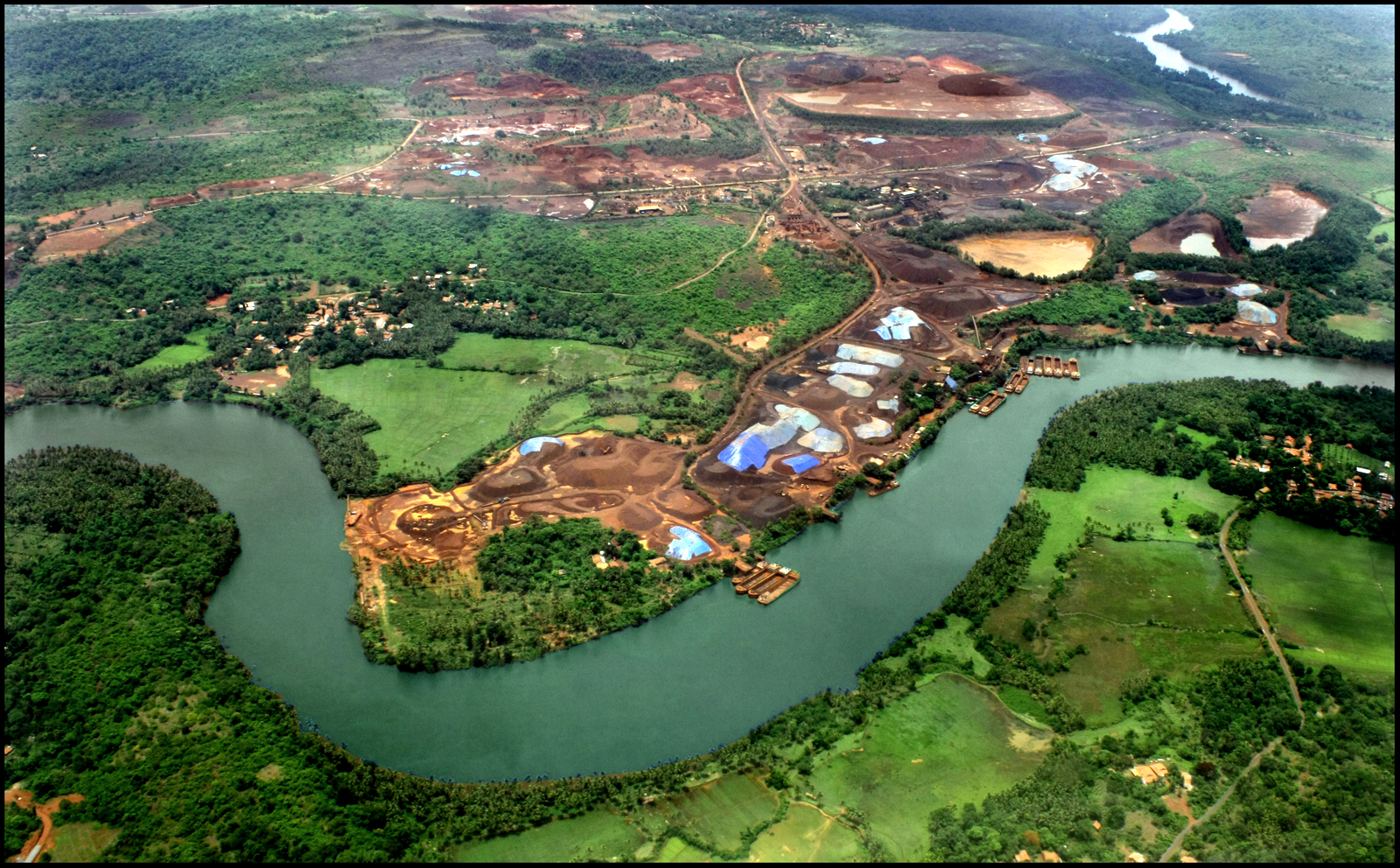

Location
- Country: India
- State: Goa

Physical characteristics
- Mouth
  - location: Arabian Sea, India
- Length: 34 km (21 mi)
- Discharge
  - average: 103 m^{3}/s (3,600 cu ft/s)

The Zuari River Zuvari, pronounced [zuwəːriː]) is the largest river in the state of Goa, India. It is a tidal river which originates at Hemad-Barshem in the Western Ghats. The Zuari is also referred to as the Aghanashani in the interior regions. It flows in a south-westerly direction through the talukas of Tiswadi, Ponda, Mormugao, Salcete, Sanguem and Quepem.

The Zuari is 92 km long, but is connected to other rivers and canals such as Mandovi river (62 km in length) and Cumbarjua Canal (15 km). The other rivers in Goa are shorter such as Terekhol (22 km), Chapora (29 km), Baga (5 km), Sal (16 km), Talpona (11 km), and Galgibag (4 km). Their lengths and widths vary with tidal and other seasonal flooding. The tributaries of Zuari include Kushawati River, Guleli River and Uguem River.

The Zuari and Mandovi Rivers form an estuarine system. They are the backbone of Goa's agricultural industry. The Cumbarjua Canal, linking the two rivers has enabled ships navigate to the interior regions to the iron ore mines. The waters of the Mandovi and Zuari both flush out into the Arabian Sea at Cabo Aguada, a common point forming the Mormugao harbour. The port city of Vasco da Gama, Goa lies on the mouth of the Zuari River.

== See also ==
- Nanda Lake
