= Volvoi =

Village in Ponda, India

Coordinates: 15.494°N 74.011°E

- Village
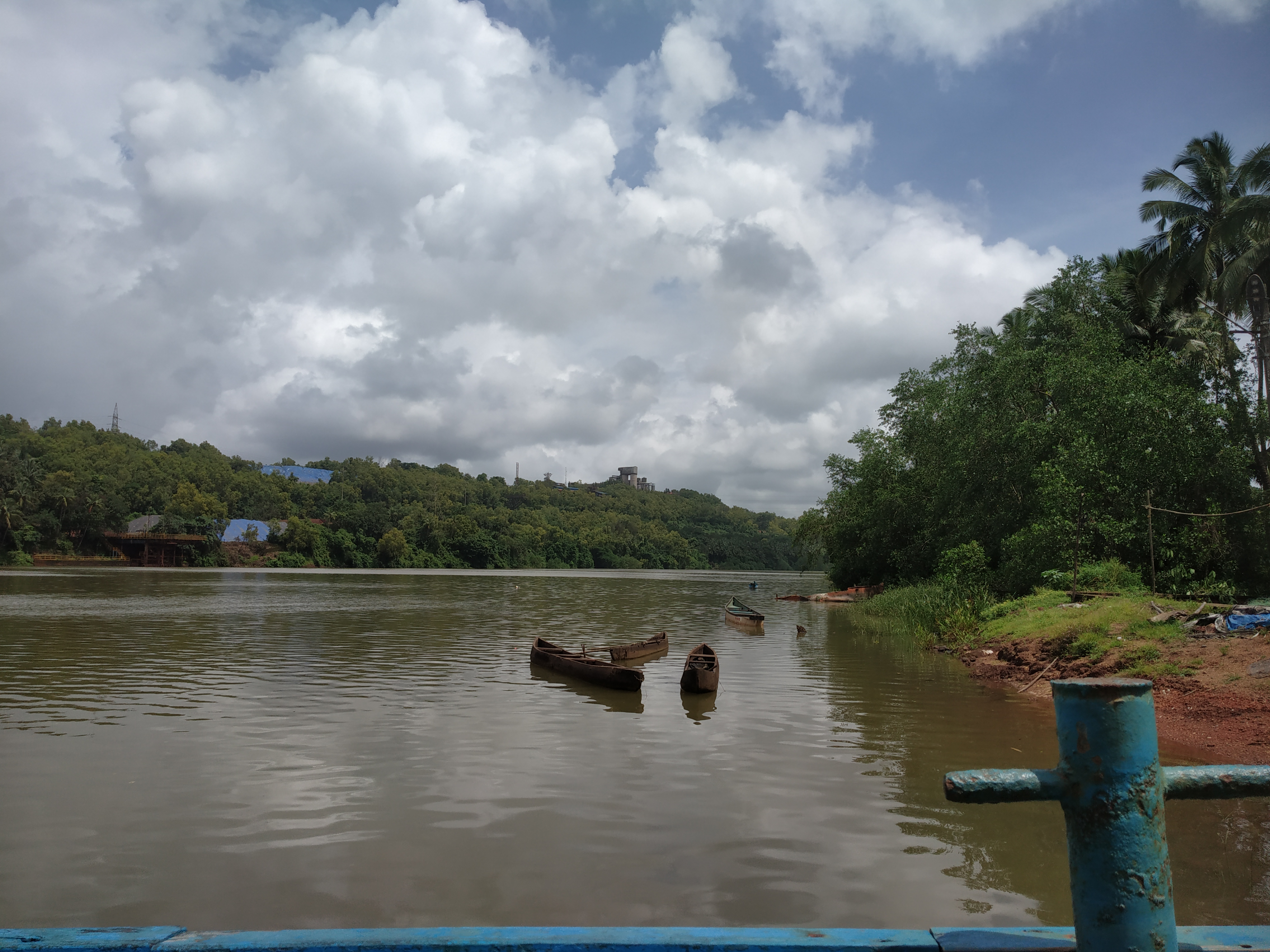
- Volvoi ferry at Khandepar

- Location in Goa, India Volvoi (India)
- Country: India
- State: Goa
- District: North Goa
- Taluka: Ponda

Government
  - Type: Village panchayat
  - Body: Volvoi village panchayat

Area
  - Total: 1.35 km^{2} (0.52 sq mi)

Population (2011)
  - Total: 1,842
  - Density: 1,360/km^{2} (3,530/sq mi)
- Time zone: UTC+5:30 (IST)

Volvoi is a village in Ponda taluka, Goa, India.

It has its own Volvoi village panchayat, which has five panchayat members.

In the 2011 census, Volvoi was found to have an area of 135.14 hectares, with a total of 385 households, and a population of 1,842 persons – comprising 1,024 males and 818 females. The zero-to-six age group population comprised 141 children, of these 66 were males and 75 females.
