= Mandovi River =

River in southwest India

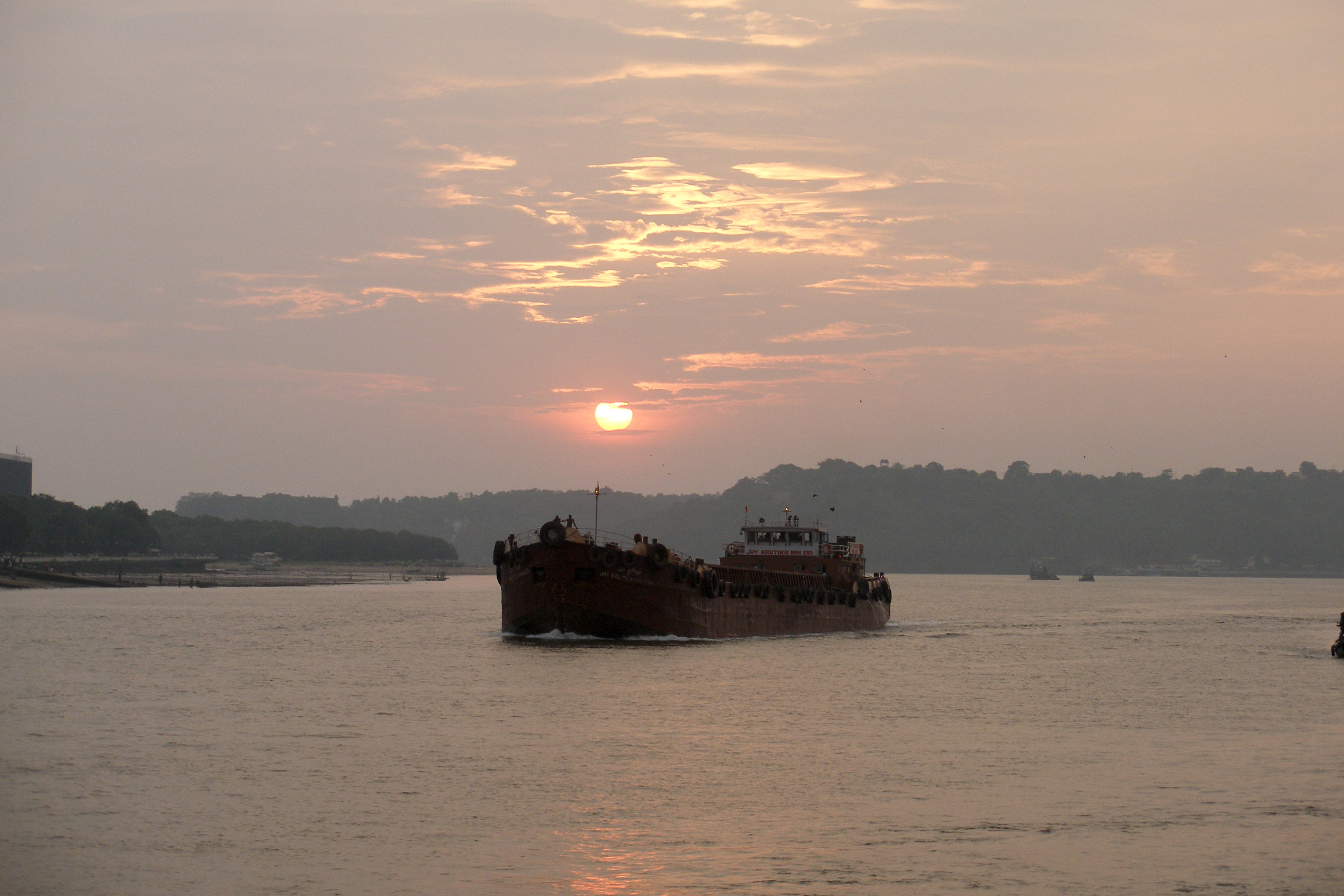
- Mandovi River in 2007

- Location in Goa

Location
- Country: India
- State: Goa

Physical characteristics
- Source: Bhimgad
  - location: Karnataka, India
- Mouth
  - location: Arabian Sea, India
  - coordinates: 15°29′38″N 73°48′40″E
- Length: 81 km (50 mi)
- Discharge
  - average: 200 m^{3}/s (7,063 cu ft/s)

The Mandovi (IPA: Konkani pronunciation: [maːɳɖɔwĩː]) or Mahadayi (IPA: Kannada pronunciation: [məɦəd̪ɑːji]), formerly known as the Rio de Goa, is a river described as the lifeline of the Indian state of Goa. The Mandovi and the Zuari are the two principal rivers in the state of Goa. The Mandovi joins the Zuari at a common creek at Cabo Aguada, forming the Mormugao harbour. Panaji, the state capital, and Old Goa, the former capital of Goa, are both situated on the left bank of the Mandovi.

== River course ==
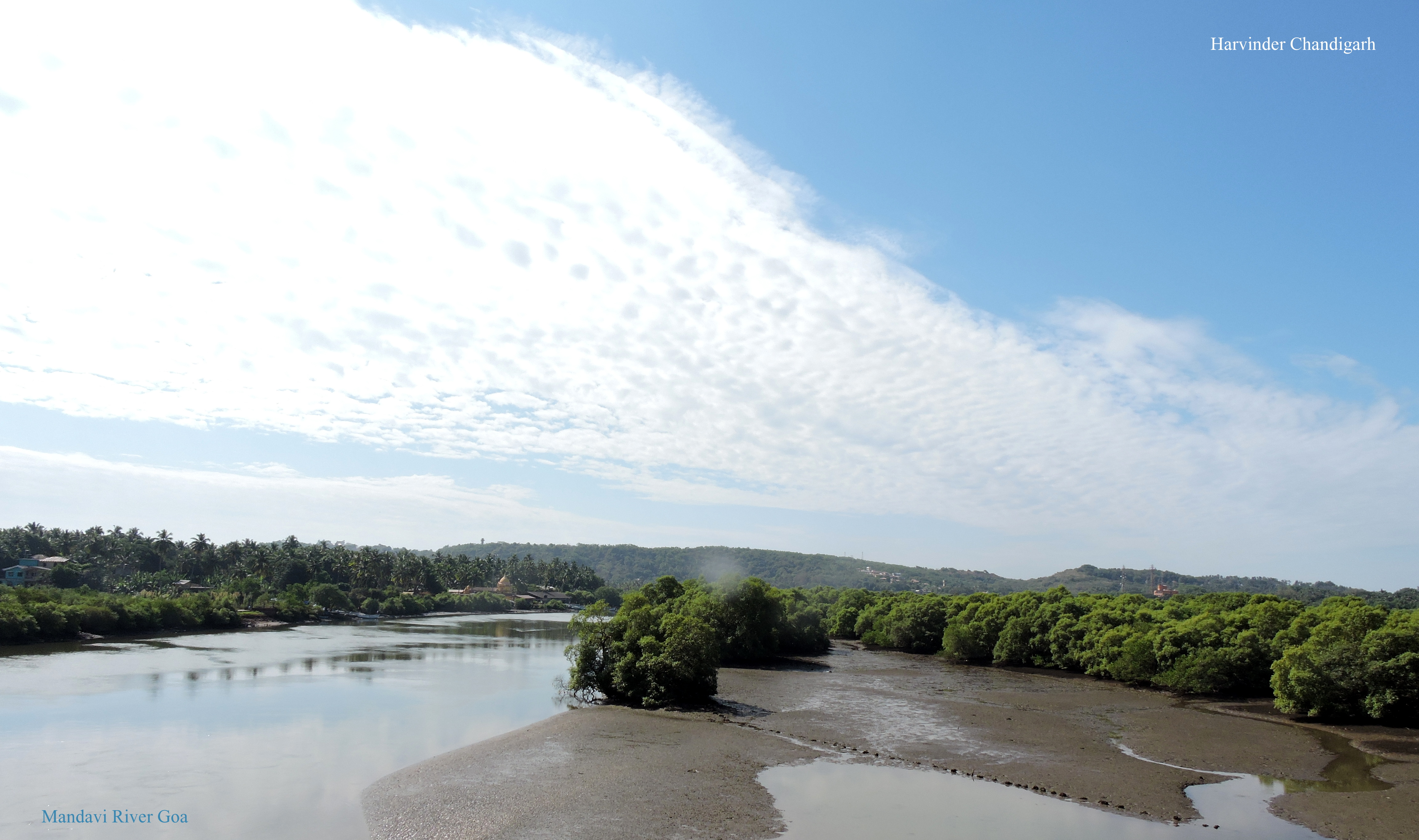
Mandovi River view on cloudy day in winter

The river has a total length of 81 kilometres (50 miles)—1 kilometre (0.62 miles) in Maharashtra, 35 kilometres (22 miles) in Karnataka, and 45 kilometres (28 miles) in Goa. It originates from a cluster of 30 springs at Bhimgad in the Western Ghats of Belgavi district in Karnataka state. The river has total 2,032 km^{2} catchment area of which 1,580 km^{2}, 375 km^{2} and 77 km^{2} catchment area are in Goa, Karnataka and Maharashtra respectively. With its cerulean waters, Dudhsagar Falls and Varapoha Falls, it is also known as the Gomati in a few places.

The Mandovi enters Goa from the north via the Sattari Taluka and from Uttara Kannada District of Karnataka near the Castle Rock railway station. The Mandovi flows through Belagavi, Uttara Kannada in Karnataka and Cumbarjua, Divar and Chorão in Goa, eventually pouring into the Arabian Sea. The tributaries of Mandovi or Mhadei include Nerul River, St Inez Creek, Rio de Ourém, Mapusa River, Valvanti River, Udnai River, Dudhsagar River, Ragada River and Kotrachi Nadi.

The Cumbarjua Canal, which links both rivers, has made the interiors of the Mandovi accessible to ships carrying iron ore. Iron ore is Goa's prime mineral and it is mined in the eastern hills. Three large freshwater isles — Divar, Chorão and Vanxim are present in the Mandovi near the town of Old Goa. The island of Chorão is home to the Salim Ali Bird Sanctuary, named after the renowned ornithologist Salim Ali. A regular ferry transports the inhabitants between the isles and the mainland.

== Bridges ==
Spanning across the Mandovi River near Panjim are three parallel Mandovi Bridges. The older bridge collapsed in the 1980s before a new bridge was constructed to accommodate heavy transport vehicles. The Mandovi Bridge links the towns of Panjim to Porvorim. On 14 June 2014, the foundation stone for the third bridge, which is the largest bridge in Goa, was laid by Prime Minister Narendra Modi. It will span 5 kilometres (3.1 miles) and will be 15 metres (49 feet) higher than the existing bridges and will be spaced in between the two. The 3rd Mandovi bridge is named Atal Setu after former Prime Minister of India Atal Bihari Vajpayee. The bridge was inaugurated on 27 January 2019 by Union Roads Minister Nitin Gadkari, Goa CM Manohar Parrikar.

During the winter months, the peak tourist season, dusk cruises on the Mandovi operate.

== Interstate water sharing ==
The sharing of the waters of this river is a cause of dispute between the governments of Karnataka and Goa. The Karnataka government proposes to divert some water from the Mahadayi river to the Malaprabha River basin as part of the Kalasa-Banduri Nala project, as approximately 188 tmcft of water at 75% dependability is available in the river. Mahadayi Water Disputes Tribunal under Interstate River Water Disputes Act has been constituted to decide the sharing of the river waters by the riparian states. In August 2018, Mahadayi Water Tribunal verdict permitted Goa to use 24 tmcft (excluding the 9.395 tmcft prevailing uses), Karnataka to use 13.42 tmcft of which 5.5 tmcft is meant for use within the river basin and for diversion to the Malaprabha reservoir, and around 8 tmcft for power generation (including 3.9 tmcft for export outside the basin) and Maharashtra to use 1.33 tmcft for consumptive purposes. The tribunal assessed the water generated in the river catchment area of Karnataka and Maharashtra as 32.11 tmcft and 7.21 tmcft respectively at 75% dependability. The tribunal has apportioned only 40.125 tmcft of Mandovi river water for consumptive uses among the three riparian states. Karnataka approached the Supreme Court alleging injustice is done in allocation of water to the state.

== See also ==
- Krishna Water Disputes Tribunal
