= Ponda, Goa =

Ponda
- City
- Location of Ponda in Goa
- Coordinates: 15°24′10″N 74°00′28″E
- Country: India
- State: Goa
- District: South Goa
- Taluka: Ponda

Government
  - Body: Ponda Municipal Council

Area
  - Total: 5.2 km^{2} (2.0 sq mi)

Population (2011)
  - Total: 22,664
  - Density: 4,400/km^{2} (11,000/sq mi)

Languages
  - Official: Konkani
- Time zone: UTC+5:30 (IST)
- PIN: 403401
- Vehicle registration: GA 05

Ponda (Romi Konkani: Fôn-èh; Portuguese: Pondá) is a city and a municipal council in the South Goa District of Goa, India.

It is the administrative headquarters of Ponda taluka and is centrally located within the state of Goa. Ponda lies 28 km (17 miles) southeast of Panaji, the capital of Goa and 17 km (10.6 miles) northeast of Margao, the South Goa district headquarters. Ponda was in North Goa district until 2015, when the state cabinet approved moving Ponda taluka, which includes the town, to South Goa.

== History ==
Most of the area that is now Ponda town was once part of the village of Quela. The town developed once the area passed from the kings of Sonda to Portugal in the late 18th century. It began as an administrative centre, with government offices and a court, and soon became a commercial centre as well. For the history of the surrounding area, see Ponda taluka#History.

== Transport ==
Ponda is a natural road junction. The road coming down the Anmod Ghat passes through the town and splits there, with branches north to Panaji and Mapusa, west and south-west to Margao and Mormugao, and south-east to Sanvordem. The Ponda–Belgaum highway links the town with Karnataka. The state government calls Ponda an important transport link and the gateway to Goa's Bondla and Mahavir wildlife sanctuaries.

== Geography ==
The town covers 5.2 km^{2}. The 2011 census town directory gives it an annual rainfall of 3,630.42 mm, with temperatures ranging between 23.51 °C and 31.53 °C.

=== Localities ===
The municipal council's ward map divides the town into 14 wards, named after the localities they cover: Shanti Nagar, Santa Cruz, Sadar, Yashwant Nagar, Khadpabandh, Dag, Warkhande, Durga Bhat, Silva Nagar, the Bazar and Pandit Wada. Several localities are split between two or more wards. Fifteen wards were contested in the council's 2023 election. Nearby places include Farmagudi, where the Goa College of Engineering stands, and Quela, which the census counts as a separate town.

== Demographics ==
According to the 2011 census of India, Ponda had a population of 22,664. Males constituted 51.8% of the population and females 48.2%. In Ponda, 9.9% of the population was under 7 years of age. The literacy rate was 94.5%, with male literacy at 95.9% and female literacy at 93.0%.

== Religion ==
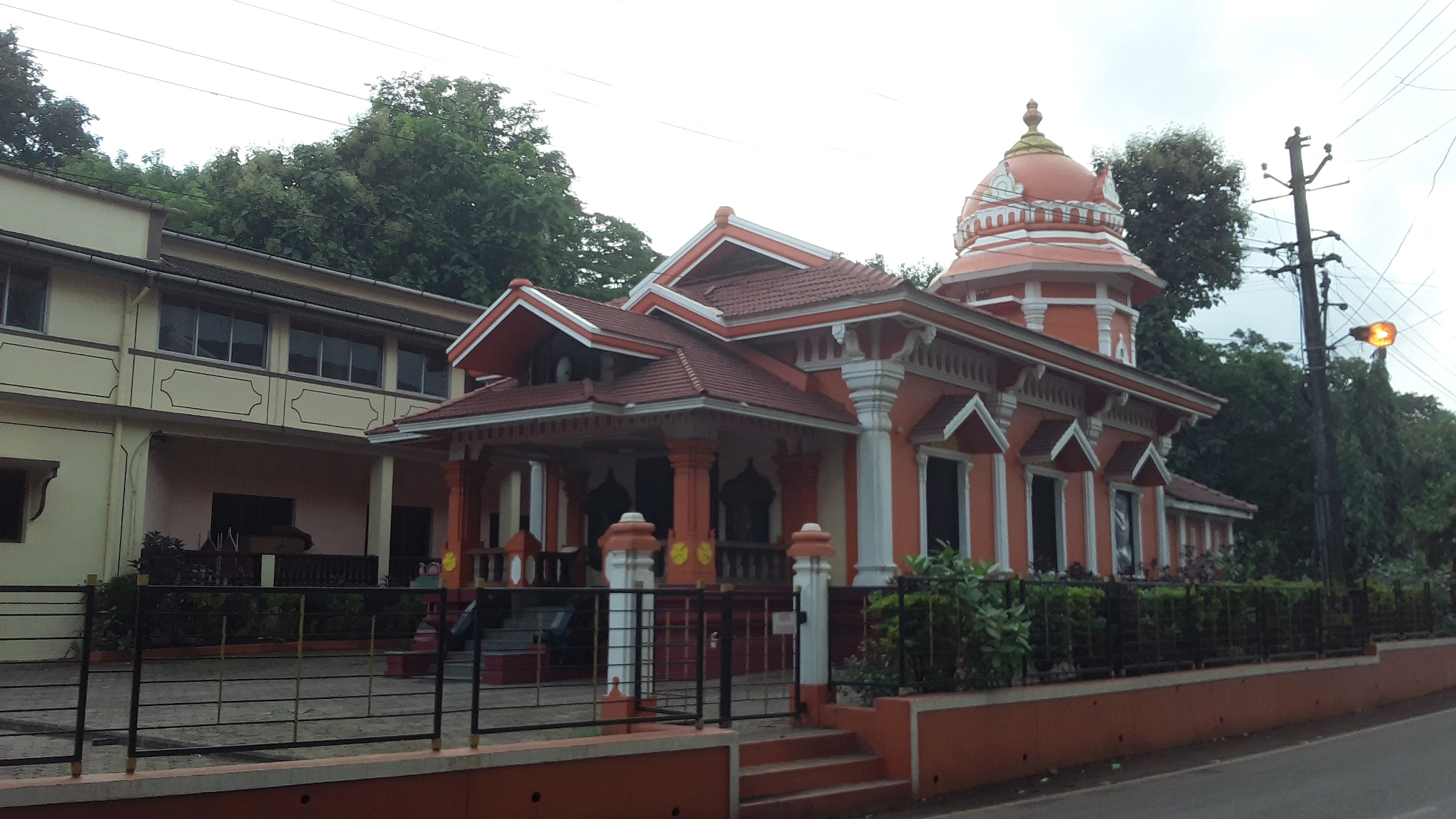
Sri Hanuman Mandir, Ponda, Goa

=== Hinduism ===
The state government describes Ponda as the "Hindu heart of Goa", and says it is known as Antruz Mahal "because of the concentration of culture, music, drama and poetry". There are many Hindu temples in and around Ponda. The temples of Shri Manguesh (Shiva), Shri Nagesh, Shri Ganapati, Shri Ramnath and the Goddesses Shri Shantadurga, Shri Mahalasa, Shri Mahalaxmi are all located nearby.

=== Christianity ===
The town's Catholic church is dedicated to Saint Anne. The church is of Neo-Roman style and is two-storey high. Its Rococo curved apex has cherubs and statue in relief. The facade has a Gable with stained glass oculus. It has finials of urn and spear-and-ball types. It has a belfry at left with horizontal banding and tiled porch up front.

=== Jainism ===
A Kannada inscription found at Bandivade, a village near Ponda, records that King Sripala founded the village and built a Jain temple of Neminatha there. The temple is now in ruins.

=== Islam ===
According to the state government, Ponda has the largest mosque in Goa. Ponda houses the Safa Masjid, one of the two 16th-century Muslim monuments in Goa that survived the Portuguese Inquisition. Built around 1560 by the Bijapuri ruler Ibrahim Adil Shah and situated 2 km from the core of the city in the Shapur locality, the Safa Masjid is found flanking the Panjim-Bengaluru highway. A tank for ablutions is also present in the mosque compound and has sprouted rumours about tunnels hidden underneath. The 1979 Gazetteer called it the largest and best known of the 27 mosques in Ponda taluka.

== Government and politics ==
Ponda is part of the Ponda assembly constituency, which falls within the South Goa Lok Sabha constituency.

== See also ==
- Siege of Ponda (1666)
