= Jai Malhar =

Indian Mythological TV series

- Genre: Theology
- Created by: Zee Marathi
- Written by: Santosh Ayachit; Ashutosh Parandkar
- Directed by: Kartik Kendhe Avinash Waghmare
- Starring: See below
- Theme music composer: Pankaj Padghan
- Opening theme: Yelkot Yelkot Jai Malhar
- Composer: A.V. Prafullachandra
- Country of origin: India
- Original language: Marathi
- No. of episodes: 942

Production
- Producers: Mahesh Kothare; Adinath Kothare
- Production location: Mumbai
- Production company: Kothare Vision

Original release
- Network: Zee Marathi
- Release: 18 May 2014 – 30 April 2017

Jai Malhar is an Indian Marathi language mythological TV series which aired on Zee Marathi. It is based on the legend of the Hindu god Khandoba, an avatar (incarnation) of Shiva. It premiered from 18 May 2014 by replacing Tu Tithe Me. It starred Devdatta Nage, Surabhi Hande and Isha Keskar in lead roles.

== Plot ==
This series is based on Martanda Bhairava aka Khandoba, a reincarnation of Shiva.

== Cast ==
=== Main ===
- Devdatta Nage as Shiva, Khandoba and Khandu Gavda.

Khandoba is an incarnation of Shiva. He is the slayer of demons Mani and Malla. He protects his devotees from any obstacles. He predominantly resides in Jejuri. Besides, many other shrines are dedicated to him.

- Surabhi Hande as Mhalsa Devi, who is from Nevasa. Daughter of Timmasheth Vani (merchant) and Mayananda. She marrie Khandoba and came to Jejuri. She is wife of Khandoba, a loving housewife who takes ferocious form to slay demons and is the queen of Jejuri. She is the incarnation of Parvati whose appearance is of Mohini, a form of Vishnu.
- Isha Keskar a Banai Devi and Jayadri. Banai also known as Banubai, is from Dhangarpada of Chandanpuri. Her biological parents are actually Indra (king of deities) and Shachi, but she was raised by Ajamel, a Dhangar man. She is devoted to Khandoba and is his wife. Jayadri is the daughter of Indra and Shachi, who later reborn as Banai due to curse put upon her by Indra.

=== Recurring ===
- Gauri Sukhtankar as Parvati Devi. Parvati is the consort of Shiva and daughter of King Himavan. She is who gave promise to Jayadri to be Shiva's wife as Mhalsa. She is only Mhalsa as Shiva said that due to her decision regarding Jayadri, as Mhalsa she will forget Jayadri. She often comes forth before Mhalsa and convinces Mhalsa about doing many things
- Bageshree Nimbalkar as Ganga Devi.

Ganga Devi is personification of river Ganga. She is sister of Parvati, elder to her. She also loves Shiva. Parvati Devi doesn't like this. She is also related to Banai.

- Prashant Choudappa as Sardar Choudappa (commander in chief of Khandoba).
- Shanay Shekhar Bhise as Ganesha, the son of Shiva and Parvati. He in Kailas was the witness of the promise given by Devi Parvati to Jayadri. He comes to Jejuri and often convinces Mhalsa Devi and Banai about many things and clears their various doubts about their original forms. He removes obstacles of path of many people. Mhalsa Devi, in this incarnation tooshares a loving motherly relationship with him. He often makes Mhalsa Devi forget her anger by amusing her. Mhalsa Devi Quickly becomes cheerful in his presence. He is cheerful, sometimes naughty but also caring and loving towards his devotees.
- Atul Abhyankar / Nakul Ghanekar as Hegadi Pradhan and Vishnu.

Vishnu served as Prime Minister in the form of Hegadi Pradhan for Khandoba in the battle against the demons Mani and Malla. He is intelligent and aware of etiquette. He helps Khandoba in making of plans and figuring them out.

- Purva Subhash as Lakshmi, the wife of Vishnu who supports Khandoba and Vishnu (as Hegadi Pradhan) in their tasks. She is the daughter of Samudra Dev, the sea god. She is a loving and caring woman and loves her husband, Vishnu very much. She often convinces and advises Mhalsa Devi about many things.
- Anirudhha Joshi as Sage Narada.

Narada is a Vedic sage who is the messenger of gods and deities. He is a great devotee of Vishnu and helps Khandoba and Vishnu in their tasks. He trains Banai to get wedded to Khandoba. He sometimes unknowingly creates conflicts and also spices up some news.

- Swapnil Rajshekhar as Indra Dev.

Indra Dev is the king of gods and father of Banai. He only cursed jayadri and send her to Chandanpuri as a baby, where She was grown up as a Dhangar and named as Banai, he also tried to stop marriage of Khandoba and Banai, but later he supports Banai as she is his daughter. He also had opened the secret to Banai that Hegadi Pradhan and Lakshmi Devi were actually Vishnu and Lakshmi Devi.

- Akshay Milind Dandekar as Nandi.

Nandi is known as Vahana (mount) of Shiva. Since, Khandoba is a reincarnation on Shiva Nandi is seen prominently in the story of Jai Malhar as Nandi, Nandeshrav and Nandeshwar. He usually is a link between Khandoba and Mhalasa and Banu. He is the eyewitness of every activity of Shiva and Paravati in Kailasa. He knows about the past life of Mhalasa Devi and Banai but he is not supposed to open up about it.

- Siddhesh Prabhakar as Surya.

Surya is the solar deity. Mhalsa Devi worships him and everyday offers him an Arghya and asks him many questions. Khandoba's name is Martanda Bhairava, in which Martanda means Sun. So, Mhalsa Devi's Sun god worship can be traced here.

- Aarti More as Latika.

Latika is the childhood friend of Mhalsa and helps Mhalsa in her tasks. She often hears confidential conversations and conveys it to Mhalsa Devi which creates conflicts.

- Priyanka Waman as Manji.

Manji is a very close childhood friend of Banai, who shares her every problems with Manji in order to figure it out.

- Mahesh Phalke as Ranga.

Ranga is a cowherd resident in Chandanpuri and a friend of Banai.

- Anjali Valsangkar as Shevanti.

Shevanti is the mother of Ranga.

- Sonam Mhasvekar as Gangi.

Gangi is the wife of Ranga, she often dominates Ranga.

- Prajakta Kelkar as Mayananda, Mhalsa's mother.

== Production ==
This series has gained popularity among the followers of Khandoba. The costumes and jewellery used in this series have set a trend in fashion in some cities across Maharashtra. The title montage has been particularly popular. The effort taken by lead actors has been appreciated. It was happened first time on Zee & other Networks that serial version are in Non-Indian launguage and also dubbed in Thai aired Zee Nung as Jay Martand and popular Indian show in Thailand, Singapore & Malaysia.

=== Dubbed versions ===
Language	Title	Original release	Network(s)	Last aired	Ref.
Tamil	Veera Marthandan	21 September 2015	Zee Tamil	11 December 2015	
Hindi	Jay Malhar	—N/a	Zee TV	—N/a	
Thai	Jay Martand	8 October 2018	Zee Nung	—N/a	

== Reception ==
=== Special episode ===
==== 1 hour ====
1. 18 May 2014
2. 3 October 2014
3. 22 March 2015
4. 25 April 2015
5. 19 July 2015
6. 27 September 2015
7. 29 November 2015
8. 27 March 2016
9. 17 July 2016
10. 6 September 2016
11. 25 September 2015

==== 2 hours ====
1. 17 August 2014 (Khandoba-Mhalsa's Marriage)
2. 3 May 2015 (Khandoba-Banai's Marriage)
3. 8 January 2017 (Malhari Avatar)
4. 30 April 2017 (Last Episode)

=== Ratings ===
The show received highest TVRs of 5.3 and 5.6 in week 47 and 52 of 2014.

Week	Year	BARC Viewership		Ref.
Week	Year	TRP	Rank	Ref.
Week 52	2014	1.7	1	
Week 28	2016	1.5	4	
Week 35	2016	1.9	5	
Week 38	2016	1.9	5	
Week 15	2020	0.9	4	

== Awards ==
Zee Marathi Utsav Natyancha Awards
Year	Category	Recipient	Role
2014	Best Character Male	Nakul Ghanekar	Hegdi Pradhan
2014	Best Supporting Female	Purva Subhash	Lakshmi
2014	Best Title Song	Nilesh Moharir	
2015	Best Actor	Devdatta Nage	Khandoba
2015	Best Actress	Surabhi Hande	Mhalsa
2015	Best Actress	Isha Keskar	Banai
2016	Best Supporting Male	Aniruddha Joshi	Narada
2016	Best Supporting Female	Purva Subhash	Lakshmi

== See also ==
• Khandoba Temple, Jejuri
