= Banai (goddess) =

Hindu goddess

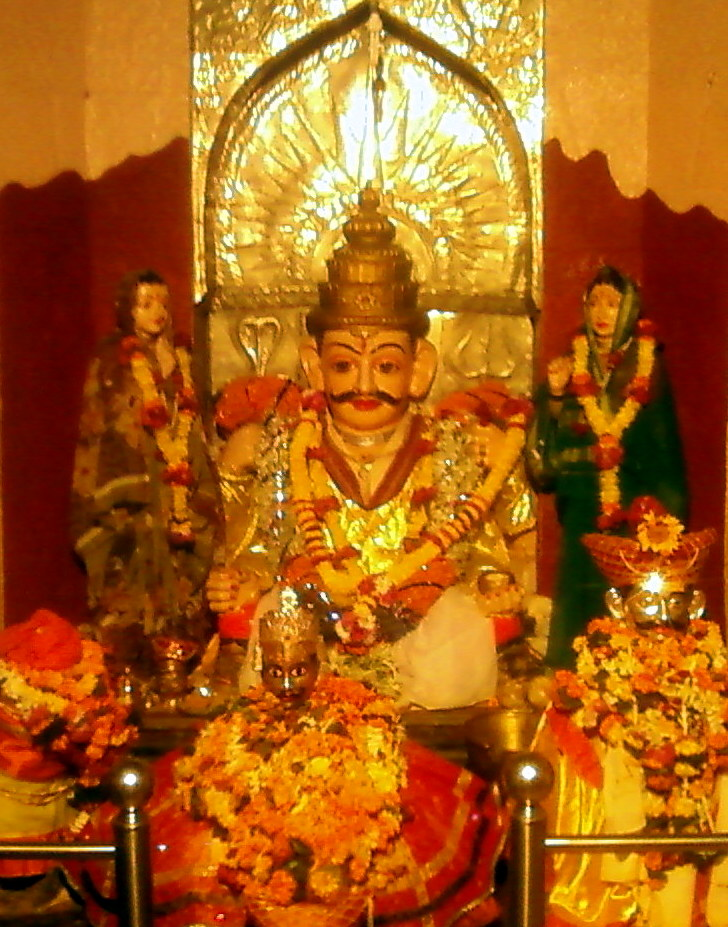
Khandoba with his two chief wives: Mhalsa and Banai

Banai (Marathi: बाणाई Bāṇāi, sometimes बानाई), also known as Banu (Bāṇu, बानू) and Banu-bai (Bāṇu-bāī, बानू-बाई), is a Hindu goddess and the second wife of the god Khandoba. Khandoba is a form of the god Shiva worshipped in the Deccan – predominantly in the Indian states of Maharashtra and Karnataka. He is portrayed as a king of Jejuri, where his chief temple stands. Some traditions do not give Banai the status of a legal wife and treat her as a concubine of Khandoba. Banai is identified with the goddess Ganga as a consort of Shiva.

While scriptures related to Khandoba do not mention Banai, she is a central subject of folk songs. Banai is considered a Dhangar, a sheep herding caste, and is sometimes regarded to be of celestial origin. Oral traditions chiefly discuss the tale of her marriage to Khandoba and her conflicts with his first wife Mhalsa. Banai is an antithesis of Mhalsa; together they complete the god. Banai is generally depicted with Khandoba and often is also accompanied by Mhalsa.

Banai does not enjoy independent worship, but is worshipped as Khandoba's consort in most of his temples. She is the patron goddess of the Dhangar community and is worshipped as a protector of their herds.

== Development and symbolism ==
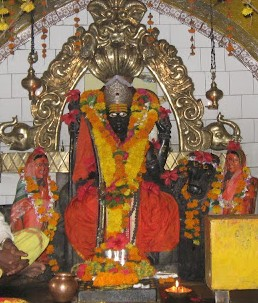
Khandoba with Mhalsa and Banai, at Mailar Mallanna Temple, Khanapur near Bidar, Karnataka

Though Khandoba is a god with five wives, his first two consorts Mhalsa and Banai are the most important. The tale of the King or god with two wives is retold with some variation across India: Murugan and his wives Devasena and Valli; Venkateswara, Lakshmi and Padmavati being some examples. The motif of Shiva and his wives Parvati and Ganga is told in the Puranas.

The theme of the god marrying a tribal girl like Banai recurs across the Deccan region; another example being Valli's marriage to Murugan. Deities across the Deccan (even extending to Kerala and Tamil Nadu) often have two wives; one wife from a high caste and another from the lower social strata: a lower caste or a tribal. Khandoba's wives who come from various communities establish cultural linkages of the god to these communities, who worship them as their patron god.

While Banai is considered a legal wife of Khandoba in Maharashtra (especially with the Dhangars), the Kurubas of Karnataka regard her as a concubine. While Mhalsa is from the high-caste Lingayat merchant (Vani) community, Banai is described as a Dhangar (shepherd caste), representing the "outside" and associates Khandoba with non-elite herding castes like Dhangars, Gavli and Kuruba (Gowda) who live in the forest. Some traditions consider Banai a Gavli (cowherd caste) or Koli (fisherman caste). In Karnataka, she is called Kurbattyavva and is a Kuruba.

Banai is the antithesis of Mhalsa. Mhalsa has a regular ritualistic marriage with Khandoba. Banai, on the other hand, has a love marriage after being captured by the god. Mhalsa is described as pure, jealous and a good cook; Banai is impure, erotic, resolute, but does not even know to cook. Mhalsa represents "culture" while Banai "nature"; together they aid the god-king Khandoba.

The oral legends and texts initiate a process of Sanskritization of the folk deity Khandoba by elevating him to the classical Hindu god Shiva; his two principal wives Mhalsa and Banai are equated to Parvati and Ganga. Banai does not appear in the Sanskrit Malhari Mahatmya, the main scripture related to Khandoba, however it mentions Ganga arriving from heaven. Banai (Ganga) has a quarrel with Mhalsa (Parvati), ultimately ending with the message that both are the same. Some Dhangars consider Banai also to be a form of Parvati.

The chief source of legends related to Banai are ovi (pada) or folk songs sung by Vaghyas and Muralis, the male and female bards of Khandoba. They sing at jagrans (a vigil) where the bards sing in praise of Khandoba through the night. The songs talk about the relationship of Khandoba to his consorts and the mutual relationships of the wives. They are centred on Mhalsa and Banai and often narrate about their quarrels. The tale of the marriage of Khandoba and Banai is a central theme in many Dhangar folk songs. The Varkari saint Sheikh Muhammad (1560–1650) disparages Khandoba in his Yoga-samgrama and calls him the "mad" god that searches for Banai due to "sexual passion", an allusion to the tale of Banai's marriage, indicating that the tale was well-established by this era.

According to scholar Günther-Dietz Sontheimer, the legend of Banai has close parallels with the story of King Dushyanta and Shakuntala from the Hindu epic Mahabharata. The tale of another folk god Mhaskoba (Bhairava) to gain his wife Balurani or Balai despite obstacles is also similar to Khandoba's endeavour to win over Banai.

== Legends ==
Banai does not appear in the Malhari Mahatmya originating from the Brahmin (high-priest caste) tradition, which glorifies Khandoba as Shiva and de-emphasizes his earthly connections. In contrast, Banai occupies the central position in the Dhangar folk narrative and Mhalsa's marriage to Khandoba is reduced to a passing mention; Marathas and other settled castes give more importance to Mhalsa.

=== Early life ===
Generally, Banai's birth is not discussed in the folk songs. Few regard her as an avatar of the apsara (celestial nymph) Rambha, while others consider her one of the seven daughters of Indra, the king of the gods. She is found by a Dhangar in a golden box in the forest, hidden in a termite mound or a pit. Her Dhangar father (sometimes named Yamu) is the chief of shepherds, who owns nine lakh sheep and goats, nine lakh lambs and numerous barren ones. Yamu is said to have prayed for a child and finds Banai in a box. A virgin ewe is said to have fed Banai her milk, as Yamu does not have a wife and does not know how to feed the infant. In another miracle, a three-storeyed house appears at the place of Yamu's tent for the young Banai to reside, while the rest of the Dhangars live in tents. She grows up as a rich shepherdess and becomes the overseer of twelve Dhangar vadas (pastoral settlements or camps, inhabited by different Dhangar clans). She cares for her sheep, grazes them and learns how to breed them.

=== Marriage ===
Once, Khandoba and Mhalsa play a game of saripat (translated as game of dice or chess). Khandoba loses everything to Mhalsa in the wager, except his dhoti, his flag, his staff (wand) and his bhandari, the bag of magical bhandara (turmeric powder). In a dream, he sees Banai and falls in love with her. He goes on a hunt in the forest, gets away from the army and stays with Banai for twelve years. He marries her in non-ritualistic marriage and brings her back to Jejuri. A variant describes how Khandoba arrives in Chandanpur on a hunting expedition and becomes thirsty. A Dhangar directs him to Banai's vada. Banai offers him water or sends a pot of water, in which Khandoba reads Banai's name. In another version, the pot with nine jewels is a sign for Khandoba to recognise Banai, the girl he saw in his dream. He falls for her and loses purposefully in saripat with Mhalsa and accepts a twelve-year exile. In this period, he disguises himself as an impoverished, old leper and becomes a man-servant of Banai's father. Some folk songs have erotic overtones, for example, some songs give erotic descriptions of Banai's beauty which maddens Khandoba.

Khandoba is described as doing odd jobs under Banai's orders. Banai first assigns him the task of sweeping the entire vada. He is responsible for cleaning the sheep pens and taking the sheep and lambs for grazing. He completes all tasks by spreading his magical bhandara. The shepherds are astonished how a single old man can handle all the animals. Their vanity is crushed. Banai assigns him the additional responsibility of taking care of five hundred children. She commands if any sheep or lamb is lost or a child cries, she will not give him his food. But Khandoba fulfils the tasks again by spraying his bhandara. She assigns him the job of washing the sheep and lambs. Instead, Khandoba kills all her sheep and lambs to humble the shepherds and Banai. He skins the sheep and separates the meat. A repentant Banai begs his forgiveness; he agrees to revive her flock on the condition that Banai marries him. Khandoba revives the sheep by spreading his bhandara and reveals his true form.

The wedding is deemed not in accordance to Hindu rituals. Banai and Khandoba marry in a simple, un-Brahmanical ceremony, where sheep droppings are showered on the couple, instead of rice as in the ritualistic weddings of classical (Brahmanical) Hinduism. The wedding is conducted without a Brahmin officiating priest. Shepherds read the mantras (the responsibility of the Brahmin in a normal wedding) and the bleating of sheep replaces the traditional wedding band. The wedding is sometimes described as a gandharva marriage. Due to the unceremonious nature of the wedding, she is sometimes considered a rakh (concubine) of Khandoba.

=== After marriage ===
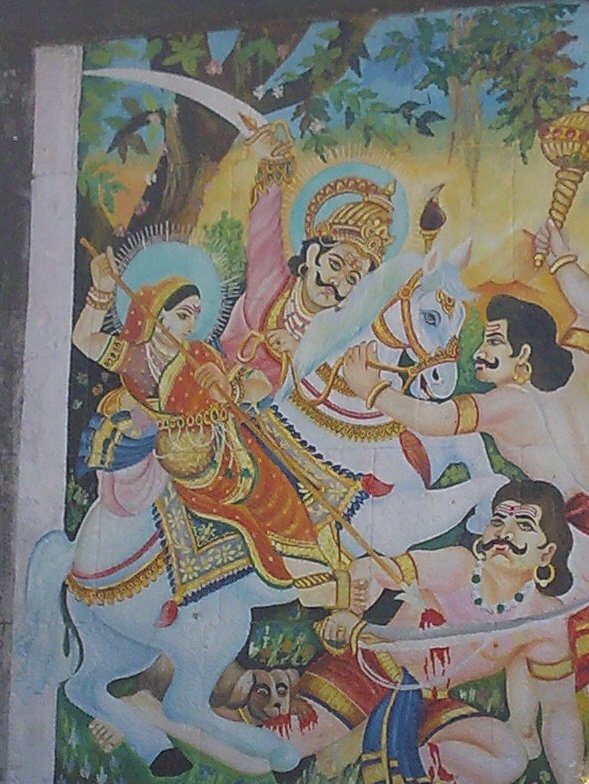
Painting on the outer wall of Banai's temple, Jejuri. Khandoba and Mhalsa are depicted killing the demons. Rarely, Banai replaces Mhalsa in the description of the incident.

In all versions, Khandoba returns to Jejuri with his new wife and faces the wrath of Mhalsa. Many songs tell about the confrontations of Mhalsa and Banai. In some songs, Mhalsa complains about Khandoba's infatuation with the impure Banai. The cantankerous Mhalsa grumbles how Banai has polluted the house by her uncouth ways and suggests that Banai should be returned to the wilderness again. The songs sing how the vegetarian, high-caste Mhalsa is forced to catch fish and eat in the same plate as the non-vegetarian low-caste Banai. Mhalsa is portrayed blaming Banai for the problems in the palace and talking about her superiority to Banai. Banai retorts by saying that Khandoba came to her, mesmerized by her beauty and became her servant. A frustrated Khandoba leaves the palace on a hunting trip after Mhalsa and Banai quarrel about who will embroider a shawl for him and marries Rambhai. The songs also narrate how ultimately the wives have to remain in harmony and aid each other. For example, a song sings how Mhalsa and Banai come together and celebrate the festival of Diwali with Khandoba at Jejuri.

Rarely, Banai also appears in Khandoba's chief legend where he slays the demons Mani and Malla. Mhalsa and Banai (or Ganga) futilely help Khandoba in the battle to collect the blood of Mani, every drop of which was creating a new demon. Finally, the dog of Khandoba swallows all the blood. Rarely, Banai is described as seated behind Khandoba on the horse and fighting with a sword or spear, a role generally assigned to Mhalsa.

== Worship and iconography ==
While traces of Banai/Balai's association with the folk god Biroba as a "mother" remain, Banai rarely enjoys independent worship in modern times. She is generally worshipped as Khandoba's consort. While in Karnataka, her temple is outside the village and Mailara (as Khandoba is known in Karnataka) journeys every year to visit it for ten nights from his temple in the village. In Maharashtra, Banai's temple is inside the village, but outside the chief temple, as in Khandoba's chief temple at Jejuri. Mhalsa - who is installed in the main temple - is said to resist the arrival of Khandoba's new wife Banai and thus, Banai does not reside in the chief temple. Frustrated by the constant quarrels between the two wives, Khandoba is said to have divided the hill of Jejuri into two halves: the lower half belongs to Banai, where she has a separate shrine while Mhalsa rules the upper half where she stays with Khandoba in the main temple. It is customary to pay respects to Banai on the way up to the main shrine, before worshipping Khandoba and Mhalsa there. It is said that Khandoba bestowed the honour of first worship on Banai, while sending her off to a separate residence.

Banai is the patron goddess of the Dhangars and the protector goddess of flock and herds. She takes care of the well-being of the community and is worshipped for increasing the herd. Stone votive images of sheep and other cattle are offered to her for plentiful animals. No animal sacrifice or non-vegetarian offerings are presented to Khandoba directly, instead non-vegetarian offerings intended for Khandoba are offered to Banai. Dhangars sacrifice rams in her honour and offer her a naivedya (food offering) of liver, meat and rice, especially on the holy days: Vijayadashami (when warriors traditionally set off on war or on a journey) and the full moon days in the Hindu months of Magha and Chaitra.

Khandoba is often depicted with two identical goddesses accompanying him, representing Mhalsa and Banai. In brass images, Banai is depicted holding a lamb and offering water to Khandoba, while Mhalsa rides with Khandoba on his horse. In metal plaques worshipped by the Dhangars, Banai accompanies Khandoba on his horse and is depicted with sheep.
