= Jejuri (disambiguation) =

Jejuri can refer to:

- Jejuri, a town in Maharashtra, India
  - Jejuri railway station
- Jejuri (poem), a work by Arun Kolatkar
