= Khandoba Temple, Jejuri =

Hindu temple in Maharashtra, India

Khandoba Temple
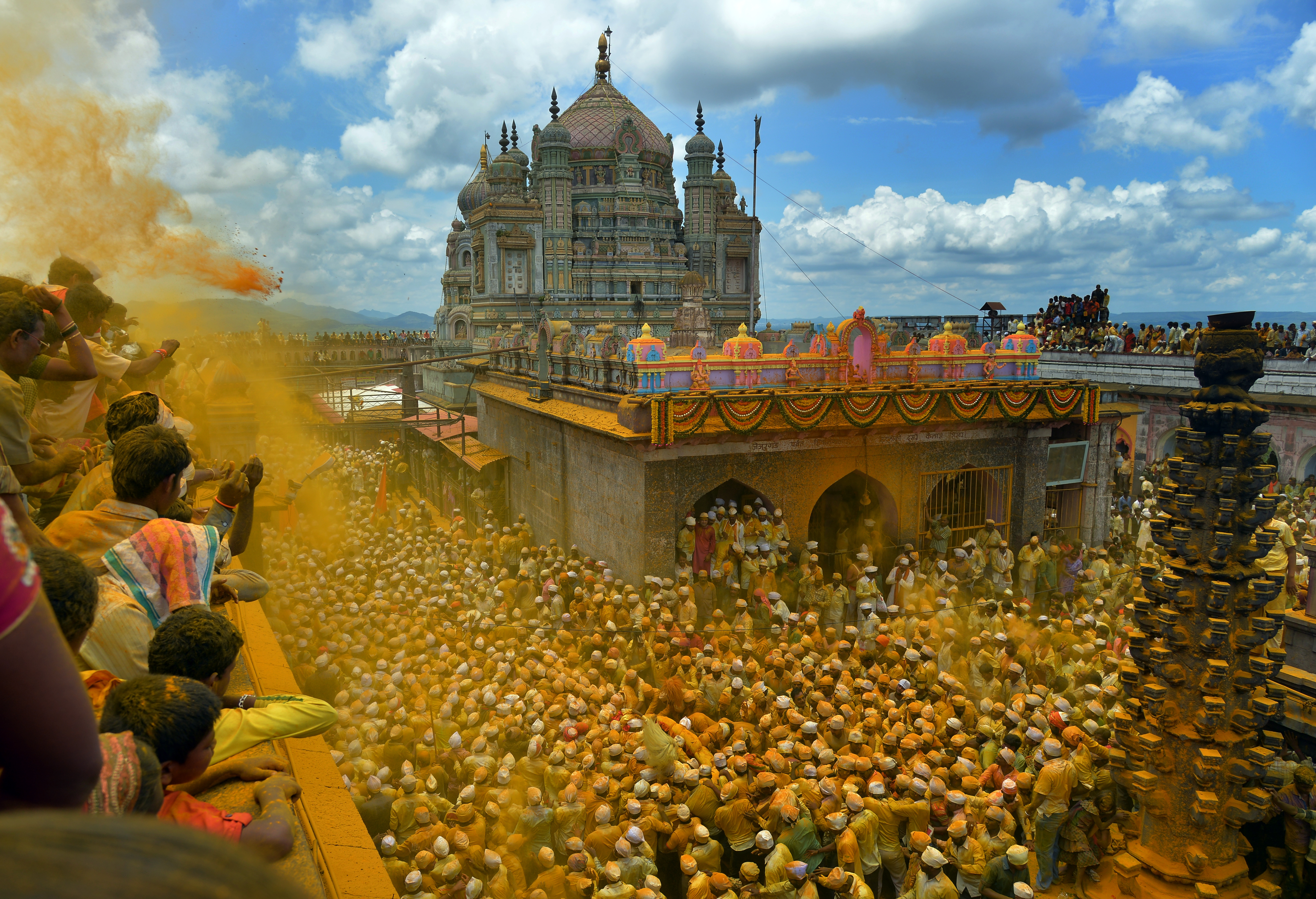
- Khandoba Mandir of Jejuri

- Location in Maharashtra Khandoba Temple, Jejuri (India)

Religion
- Affiliation: Hinduism
- District: Pune
- Deity: Khandoba
- Ecclesiastical or organisational status: Active
- Governing body: Shree Martand Dev Sansthan Temple Trust, Jejuri

Location
- Location: Jejuri, Purandar taluka
- State: Maharashtra
- Country: India
- Coordinates: 18°16′20″N 74°09′37″E

Architecture
- Style: Hemadpanthi
- Founder: Ahilyabai Holkar

Specifications
- Temple: 3
- Materials: Stone and limestone
- Elevation: 798 m (2,618 ft)

The Khandoba Temple of Jejuri is a Hindu temple dedicated to the god Khandoba, located on a hill in the town of Jejuri, Maharashtra, India. It is one of the most prominent Hindu pilgrimage centres of Maharashtra.

Jejuri's Khandoba is a Kuladevata of many farming families, Brahmins and nomadic Dhangar tribe of the Maharashtra and Deccan region.

According to legends and folklore, Khandoba was a human Avatar of Bhagawan Shiva; he used to live and rule the region from Jejuri-gad (transl. Jejuri fort), where the Mandir is now present. The Mandir is also known as Jejuri-gad. Khandoba killed the demon brothers Mani and Malla, when they harassed people.

== History ==
The worship of Khandoba began in the 12th to 13th century. It was built by Ahilyabai Holkar in 17th century. The Khandoba temple was rebuilt during the reign of the Peshwas.

In 1737–1739, Chimaji Appa, brother of Peshwa Baji Rao I, gifted Portuguese church bells from Vasai to the temple. He and his Maratha soldiers took the bells from Portuguese churches as conquest memorabilia, after defeating them in the Battle of Vasai (1737).

== Deity ==
The central deity Khandoba, also known as Khanderav, Khanderay, Malhari-Martand and Malhar, is one of the most popular deities of Maharashtra. Khandoba is regarded as an avatar of the God Shiva.

Khandoba is the Kuladevata (ancestral tutelary deity) of many people of Maharashtra. The Kunbi-Marathas casts', Dhangar tribe, herdsmen, nomadic folks of Maharashtra worship Jejuri's Khandoba.

== Legends ==
According to legend, two rakshasa brothers, Mani and Malla, pleased the god Brahma with their austerities. By Brahma's boon, they became very powerful and started destruction on Earth, harassing people. This led the God Shiva to arrive on earth in the avatar of Khandoba to destroy Mani and Malla. In a fierce battle, Khandoba killed one demon, and forgave the other when he promised to serve the common people.

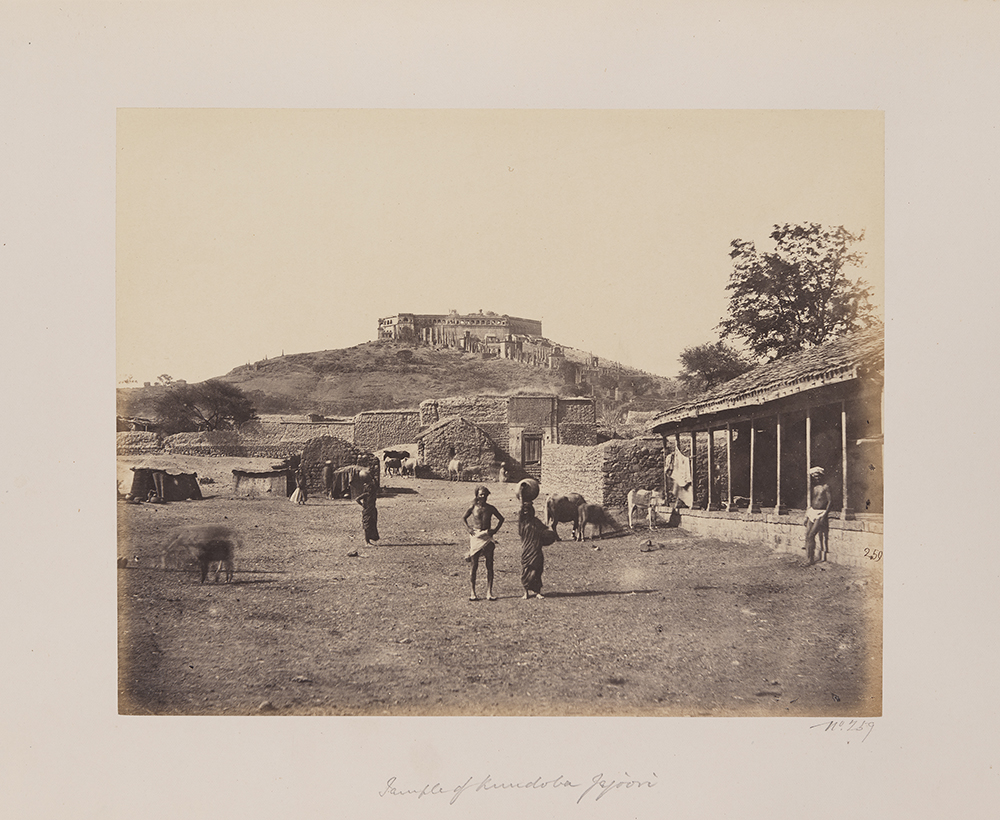
Jejuri village in foreground and Khandoba mandir on the hill in background at Jejuri, somewhere between 1855 and 1862

== Architecture ==
The temple is on a hill at an elevation of 718 m (2,356 ft). The temple can be approached by three flights of steps from the east, the west, and the north. The northern steps lead to the main entrance of the temple. The temple is accessed by climbing nearly 200 steps. The steps have around 18 arches, 350 Deep-stambha (lamp-pillars) and several shrines bordering them. Around a third of the way up, the steps split and rejoin 50 feet (15 m) higher. On one pathway going up, the pilgrims visit the shrine of Khandoba's minister, Hegadi Pradhan. The other pathway used by devotees going down, has the temple of Banai, Khandoba's second wife.

This temple looks like a hill fort, and is known as Jejuri gad (transl. Jejuri fort). The eight-sided, 350 yards (320 m) long fort boundary encloses a cloister courtyard, with the main temple shrine at the center.

In the courtyard is a brass-coated tortoise, 20 feet (6.1 m) in diameter.

The temple is built in Hemadpanthi architecture style, consisting of an outer square hall and an inner sanctum. The sanctum includes a linga (symbol of Shiva) and three pairs of images of Khandoba with his first wife Mhalsa.

The temple also has a murti of Khandoba mounted on a horse in warrior form. Khandoba is worshipped with turmeric, belfruit leaves, and by offering naivedhya made from onions and other vegetables. The devotees offer flowers and turmeric to the deity. Devotees throw turmeric in the air as an offering to the god, and as a result the steps of the hill temple and premises have a yellow hue.

It is 50 km (31 mi) from Pune.

The temple is a Maharashtra state government protected site.

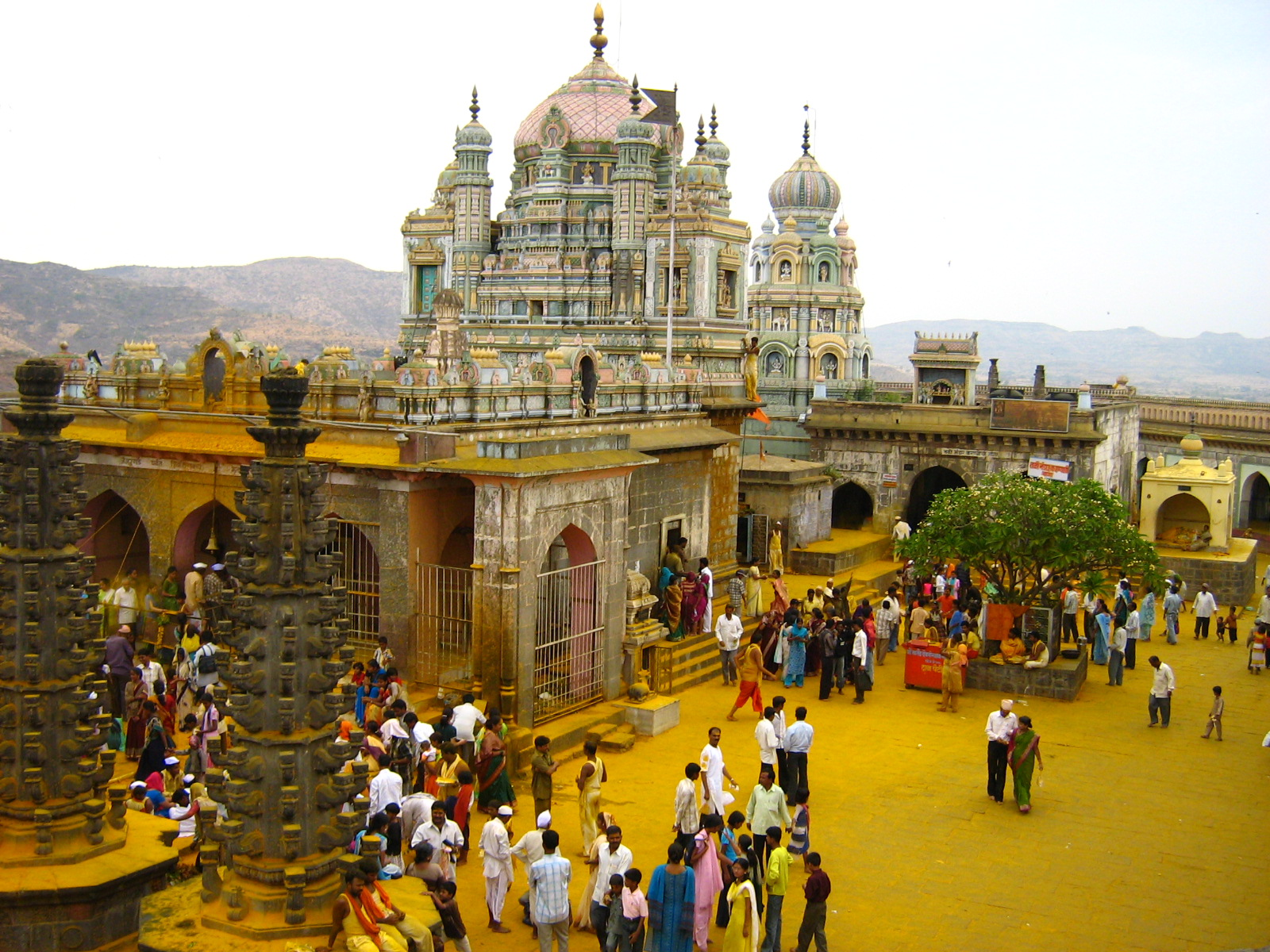
Side view of this temple

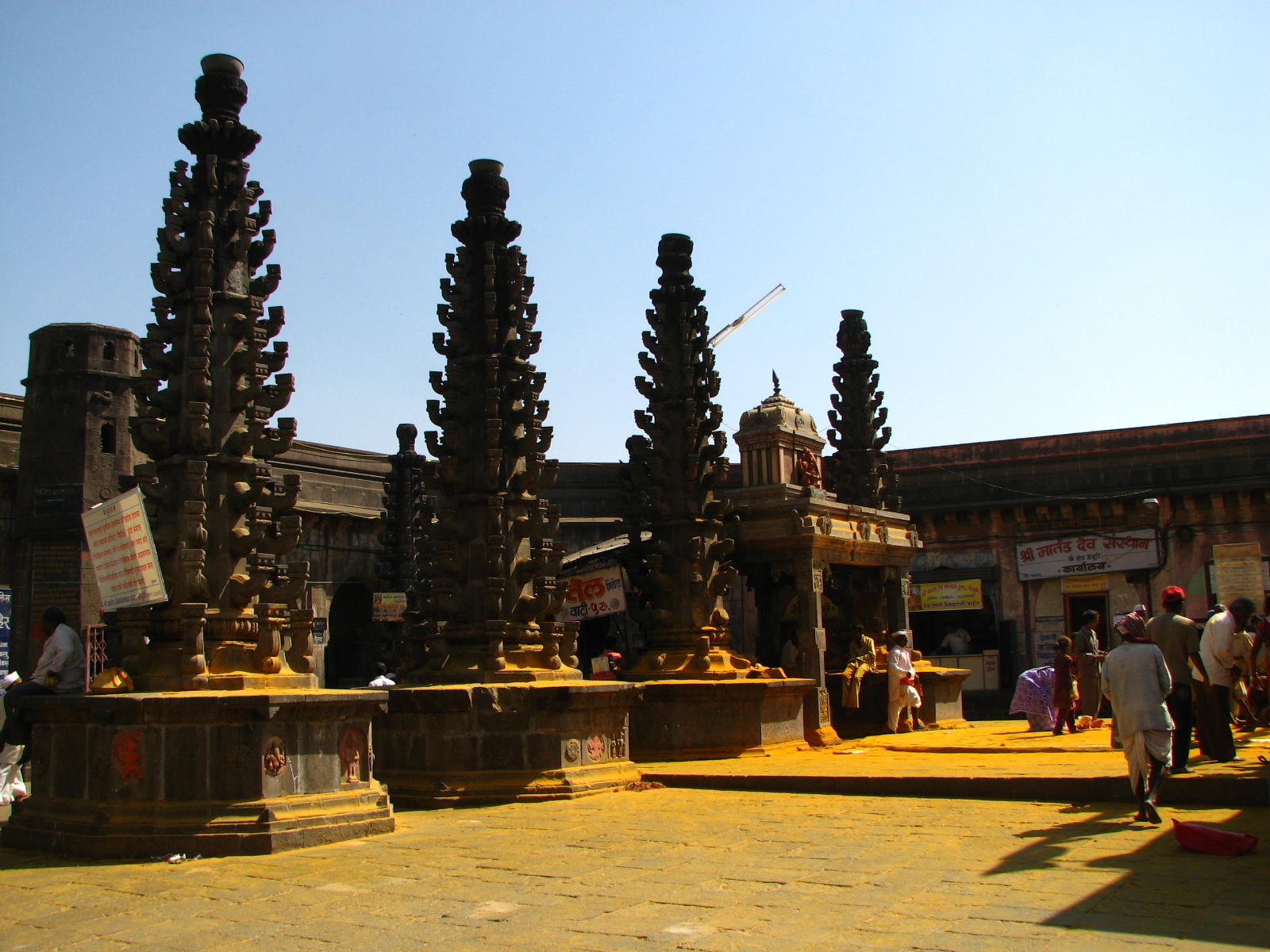
Deepstambha at Khandoba Mandir, Jejuri

== Literature ==
- Jejuri (poem) by Arun Kolatkar was based on this village and its deity.
- Peshwekalin Jejuricha Itihas (transl. History of Jejuri in Peshwa times ), a book authored by Raj Memane about the history of Jejuri during Peshwa time.

== See also ==
- Shiva, Hindu deity
- Hindu religion
- Virbhadra, Avatar of lord Shiva
- List of State Protected Monuments in Maharashtra
