= Pali, Maharashtra =

Pal or Pali is in Satara district in the state of Maharashtra, India.

Pal is known for its shrine to Khandoba, who is reincarnation of Shiva. It is situated 28 kilometres (17 mi) south of Satara. Thousands of devotees visit the shrine and in January there is an annual yatra, or pilgrimage when Shiva marries Mhalsadevi.

Distance from Pune to Khandoba Pali is 135 km (84.00 miles) and traveling time by car is 2 hours 15 mins.

== About the Temple ==
The Khandoba temple is on the left bank of the river Tarli and was built about 500 years ago by a Vani named Aba bin Sheti Padhode.

The temple lies on the site of a legendary appearance by the God Khandoba to a favourite devotee, a milkmaid named Palai in whose honour the village name was changed, from Rajapur to Pal.

Quite a few families make an annual pilgrimage to Pal-Khandoba and Aundh-Yamai-Devi.
