= Devaragudda =

Devaragudda (Kannada ದೆವರಗುಡ್ಡ), also known as Dharmaragudda, is a hill near Ranebennur in Haveri district in Karnataka State, India, well-known for a temple on its summit that attracts worshippers from around the state. In Kannada, its name means "the sacred hill belonging to the almighty". The nearest railroad is at Ranebennur, about 10 kilometres (6.2 mi) away. The nearest airport is at Hubli, 113 kilometres (70 mi) away.

== Temple ==
On top of Devaragudda is situated the temple of Lord Malatesha (ಮಾಲತೆಶ್) (the deity is also known as Jyotiba / Khandoba in some parts of the neighboring state of Maharashtra, in Andhra Pradesh the same Deity is called Mallanna). This temple is operated and maintained privately by a family residing within the temple premises as well as Karnataka government mujarai department . Religious rituals are performed here on a daily basis and special pujas are performed on Poornimas (Kannada ಹುಣ್ಣಿಮೆ, a full moon day), Saturdays and Sundays. In every February/March on particular poornima/full moon day called as BHARATH HUNNIME locally, around 80,000 - 100,000 devotees visit the holy place/day for about 10–15 days . On this particular BHARATH HUNNIME in a particular ritual called as KARNIKA forecast for the current year is predicted in the temple. On this particular day a new pair of leather chappals of about the size of 2 feet are kept in the temple which will have foot impressions of Lord Malathesha by next morning.

Within the temple premises one can also see a number of men with a peculiar clothing. They are called Gorawappa. These Gorawappa's are typically dressed in black colored gowns made of sheep wool and with religious symbols set on them. These men wear turbans on their heads and carry tridents and other religious mascots along with them. They are considered to be the messenger of the lord. Here one can occasionally see the devotees calling for the lord, "Yelukoti, Yelukoti, Yelukotigo... Changmalo, Changmalo", which means, "Oh, the great conqueror of seven forts, I have come to your shelter".

Devaragudda has a typical tropical weather ranging from 18 degrees Celsius during winters to 36 degrees in summer.

Legend has that, Malatesha Swamy appeared as god to kill two rakshasas who used to torture and kill innocents near by place till that Malatesha Swamy was there as a Shepherd and used to look after the sheep too.
