= Mailar Mallanna Temple =

- ಮೈಲಾರ ಮಲ್ಲಣ್ಣಾ ದೇವಾಲಯ
- The entrance

- Location within Karnataka Location within India

Religion
- Affiliation: Hinduism
- District: Bidar district
- Deity: Khandoba as Shiva Mailar Mallanna
- Festivals: Dussera; Mailar Mallanna Jatra Mahotsav

Location
- Location: Khanapur (Mailar) Village, Bhalki Taluka, Bidar District - 585327
- State: Karnataka
- Country: India
- Coordinates: 17.9529°N 77.3860°E

Architecture
- Style: Vijayanagara architecture
- Founder: Vijayanagara Empire
- Creator: Vijayanagara Empire
- Established: 15th Century

Specifications
- Temple: 01
- Elevation: 630 m (2,067 ft)

Website
- Sri Kshetra Mailar Mallanna Khandoba Temple

Sri Shiva Mailar Mallanna Temple is a Hindu temple dedicated to the god Khandoba (also known as Mailar Mallanna and a form of the god Shiva, in Mailar or Khanapur village). It is situated on the Bidar-Udgir Road, 15 km from Bidar, Karnataka, India. Said temple is located within the Vijayanagara ("city of victory") empire; which is now South India. Some of the languages spoken during this time were Kannada, Telugu, and Tamil.

== History ==
The temple's origin is connected with the demon Mallasur (Malla) (in Kannada asur means demons) and his younger brother Manikasur (Mani), who gained the boon of invincibility from Brahma, creating chaos on the earth and harassing the sages.

When the seven sages approached Shiva for protection after Indra and Vishnu confessed their incapability, Shiva assumed the form (or Avatar) of Martanda Bhairava, as the Mahatmya calls Mallanna (Khandoba), riding the Nandi bull, leading an army of the gods. Martanda Bhairava is described as shining like the golden sun, covered in turmeric and appearing with three-eyes and a crescent moon on his forehead.

The demon army was slaughtered by the gods and Khandoba killed Malla and Mani. While dying, Malla offered his white horse to Khandoba as an act of repentance and asked for a favor—that he be present in every shrine of Khandoba. Thus, this temple is called Sri Shiva Mailari Mallanna (Khandoba) Temple.

The Mailar Mallanna Temple is a Hindu temple dedicated to the god Khandoba (also known as Mailar Mallanna and a form of the god Shiva, in Mailar or Khanapur village). It is situated on the Bidar-Udgir Road, 15 km from Bidar, Karnataka, India. The main day of worship is believed to be Sunday. Near the temple, trading takes place. They trade animals such as goats, sheep and cows. Devotees visit this temple to seek fulfillment of salvation, wealth, knowledge, purchase of vehicles and relief of diseases. This temple attracts millions of tourists and is very beautiful to view.

== Devotees ==
Vijayanagara's kings adopted deities and ritual practices and their sacred images were transported from distant areas to the capital. As new temples were constructed new sculptures were carved with one of them being Mailar. Mailar had a long history in South India but had primarily been a regional God, worshipped by rural communities and pastorals. Sacred text suggest that this fierce protester deity began to be elevated from a regional folk deity, mainly associated with warriors, to a more widespread deity eventually linked to Vijayanagara. One of these texts depicts Mailar as "king on earth" worshipped by many Muslims. When deities were elevated in status it meant they were farce gods with warrior attributes and protectors; which linked them to the militaristic qualities of this city. Famous in the North Karnataka area, the temple attracts millions of devotees from Karnataka, Maharashtra and Andhra Pradesh annually. The temple's main priest belongs to the Kurubas community.

On Sunday, the principle worship day, the trading of goats, sheep, cows and other animals takes place nearby.

Devotees visit this temple to seek fulfillment of salvation, wealth, health, vehicles and knowledge.

== Rituals ==
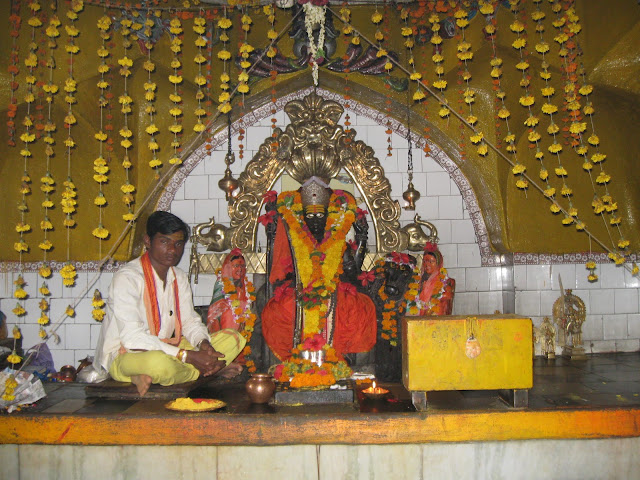

Homa, or a fire offering, is common practice before performing Rudrabhishek. Some of the offerings include grains and seeds along with other materials. The holy bath of the Shivling is done after the fire offering. This is one of the most strengthening forms of worship. This cleanses, brings happiness, wealth, peace, and success to devotees. Devotees are offered a drink after the holy bath. The devotees journey to the temple is the individual's separation from his or her old identity or position in society. The actual act of washing the Shivling is the liminal state in the process. The final stage in the passage is the journey the devotee takes on while on his way home to enter society with a new identity. It is strongly believed that performing Redrabhishek will help an individual's success in life. Hinduism believes that reality or truth cannot be encapsulated in a creedal form, but instead needs to be sought out from various sources, the holly bath being one of them. These rites of passage stages are derived from Van Gennep's. He states that every rite of passage includes three stages; the first being separation from your old identity and normal time, the second being the transition or liminal stage (as Victor Turner called it), and the third is the reintegration stage you have taken on your new identity and entered back into societies normal sense of time.

== Vijayanagara architecture ==
Architectural temples were an important part of Vijayanagara society. Sacred temples incorporated a range of regional architectural traditions that reflected those of Southern Deccan (see also Deccan Architecture) where the capital was located; this was often called a "unitary style". However, temples became increasingly ornate over time, including moldings, bricks and walled complexes built within gopuras or massive towered gates.

== Mailar Mallanna Temple in relation to Grace Harris's concepts of individual self and person ==
Individual is defined as stuff, matter and is physically touchable. An example of Individual when it comes to the Temple is Khandoba. Khandoba could be seen as an individual because it was he the individual who killed Malla and Mani. Self is established by experience as the key concept along with memory and continuity. Malla is an example of self, because before he passes he offers his white horse to Khandoba. Malla looked back at his experience and what he had done, such as causing chaos. Looking back upon his negative actions made him to decide to offer Khandoba his white horse. This act of offering his white horse was a sign of repentance. Malla offered his white horse in order for his spirit to be remembered and welcomed in the temple. Person is defined as one's relationship to others. An example of self would be Shiva's part in the representation of the temple because he is the god people reach to in order to feel protected. To the people, Shiva represents the gods and is looked up upon to protect and keep the evil away. There are concepts which combine two of Harris' ideas. Multiple factors of this legend indicate that there is the possibility that all of the concepts Individual, Self, and Person can be applied to at least most of the concepts behind the temple.

== Mailar Mallanna Temple in relation to Wallerstein's model and adaptive strategies ==
There is no known exact date to know when the temple was built and worshiping began. However, after conducting research about the other temples in the surrounding area, they were built around the late Middle Ages (1350- 1500). During the Middle Ages, India was at trading with countries, because of their access to the sea on three sides of their country. They would export textiles and iron to the big civilizations of that era, China and Egypt. This indicates according to the Wallerstein's model, that India during the Middle Ages was considered to be in the periphery. The periphery is when an area transports raw materials to the core, the core in this situation is China and Egypt. They were also at this time in between rulers because of the constant switch of empires and fighting that was continuing in all regions. This is another example of how India could be considered to be in the periphery, because they have no strong central government.

At this time period, agriculture started to become more popular, especially the production of rice, wheat and millet. Many other crops were also being brought over into this society because of the vast amount of trading that was occurring. Irrigation systems began to be introduced in India, which helped with growth of maturation of building material. This water technology could have helped with the start of building the Mailar Mallanna Temple. India during the late Middle Ages was using the adaptive strategy of cultivation, specifically agriculture. So, they are following the substance pattern because they were progressing in the adaptive strategies.
