= Jagarana =

Hindu ritual

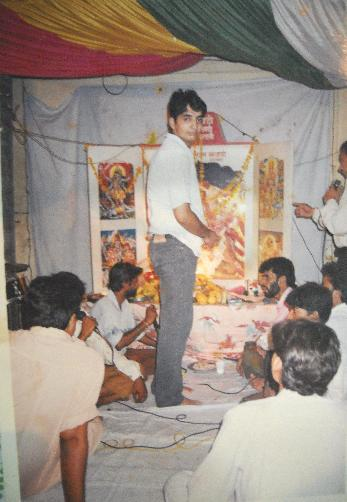
A jagran in honour of a Devi, a Hindu goddess.

Jagarana (Sanskrit: जागरण, romanized: Jāgaraṇa), also rendered Jagran, Jagarata (Sanskrit: जगराता, romanized: Jagarātā), and Jaga is a Hindu ritual, practised across India. It comprises the performance of all-night vigils, as well as puja, songs, and dances for the veneration of a deity. A jagarana is generally performed for the veneration of Hindu goddesses, major deities such as Shiva and Krishna, as well as various folk deities like Khandoba and Devnarayan. Devotees worship the deity throughout the night by singing bhajans, performing arati, and listening to legends of the deity.
