= Sheikh Muhammad =

Indian Muslim saint (1560–1650)

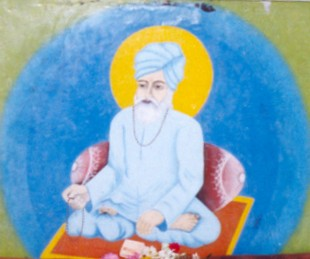

Personal life
- Born: 1560 Shrigonda
- Died: 1650 (aged 89–90)
- Notable work(s): Yoga-samgrama, Abhanga devotional poetry
- Honors: Sant (saint) in Marathi

Religious life
- Religion: Islam
- Philosophy: Advaita Vedanta

Muslim leader
- Teacher: Changa Bodhale

Sheikh Muhammad (1560–1650), also known as Shekh Mahammad (Mohammad), Sayyad Shaikh Mahammad Qadiri, Shaikh Muhammad Shrigondekar (lit. Sheikh Muhammad of Shrigonde), and Sheikh (Shekh) Mahammad-baba, was a Muslim saint-poet who is also venerated in the Hindu Varkari tradition. He is the most well-known Marathi Muslim poet. He is the author of the Yoga-samgrama (Yoga-sangrama).

== Background ==
Sheikh Muhammad was born and lived his life in Shrigonda (Shrigonde), Maharashtra, India. He was the son of Raje Muhammad, a Qadiriyya (Kadri, Qadiri) Sufi. His guru was the Hindu Vaishnava (sect worshipping the Hindu god Vishnu) saint Changa Bodhale, who was also the guru of Janardan Swami, the guru of the saint-poet Eknath (1533–1599). Changa Bodhale, known as Said Changasaheb Kadri in Sufi traditions, is considered an avatar of the Hindu god Dattatreya and was a disciple of Sheikh Muhammad's father.

== Works and teachings ==
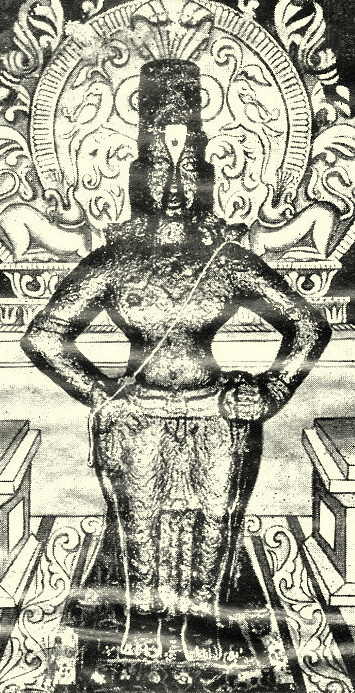
Vithoba, the patron god of Sheikh Muhammad

Sheikh Muhammad is the author of the Yoga-samgrama, the Pavana-vijaya, the Nishkalanka-prabodha, and the Jnanasagara, in addition to many songs and abhangas (devotional poems). His writings show the influence of both Hindu bhakti and Muslim Sufi traditions, and he was a follower of the Advaita Vedanta school of Hindu philosophy. These writings reveal his knowledge of the tenets of bhakti traditions, as well as his literary skills in "chaste idiomatic Marathi".

The Yoga-samgrama, composed in 1645 and containing 2319 ovis (poems), is his magnum opus. The central theme of this philosophical work is "the soul's struggle to realize and experience God". It adopts a similar metaphor from the Dnyaneshwari by the saint-poet Dnyaneshwar (1275–1296), in which the atman (soul) is the warrior riding the horse of the Mind and battles the armies of Ego and other passions in its quest to attain glory as Brahman ("Supreme Reality"). Sheikh Muhammad cites examples from the Hindu scriptures such as the Puranas and other philosophical treatises to convey his ideas. The Yoga-samgrama has references to the Hindu gods Rama, Krishna (both forms of Vishnu), Vishnu, and Shiva. Each of the eighteen chapters of the treatise begins with a prayer to Ganesha, the god of beginnings, who is invoked at the start of a book in keeping with Hindu tradition. However, Sheik Muhammad's writings reveal his monotheistic beliefs, which are rooted in Islam. He describes Hindu gods as formless (Nirakari), unmanifest (Avyakta), without form or qualities (Nirguna), and invisible (alaksa) (see Hindu views on monotheism). Sheikh Muhammad preaches the Oneness of God:

In fifty-six languages one God is exalted with different words... cleavages arise because of harangues in different tongues ... I salute the sacred Om by which the God creator (Narayan, a name of Vishnu) is known. Muslims salute him as ya Allah...

— Yoga-samgrama

Even though Sheikh Muhammad identified himself as Muslim by birth, he had chosen the Hindu god Vithoba, a form of Krishna-Vishnu in Maharashtra, as his patron deity. His "socio-religious awareness" is evident in this poem dedicated to Vithoba as Krishna:

Through the grace of Gopala (a name of Krishna),
I have transgressed all notions of purity and impurity.
The jack fruit has a thorny skin, but inside it are lumps of sugar,
The bee-hive with all its humming bees contains the very nectar inside.
(So also) Sheikh Muhammad may be an avindha (Muslim),
But in his heart he has the very Govinda (a name of Krishna).

The Yoga-samgrama contains an account of the originating legend of Vithoba and his devotee Pundalik, based on the Hindu scripture Skanda Purana. Sheikh Muhammad also wrote abhangas in praise of Vithoba.

According to Sontheimer and Kulke, the Yoga-samgrama is an "unusually frank critique" of Hindu Brahmanical ritualism and folk Hinduism. While Sheikh Muhammad accepts classical Hindu deities, he vilifies folk Hindu deities. He mocks the shrines of the Hindu mother goddess placed on roads and in fields: "If the deities were all that powerful, how come the dogs urinate on them?" He also criticizes self-torture rituals like hook-swinging, performed to appease folk deities. Sheikh Muhammad especially condemned the popular folk god Khandoba and the rituals of his cult. He criticized the practice of muralis, girls offered to Khandoba to serve the god, but who were forced into prostitution. Sheikh Muhammad does not spare Islam and criticizes some of its aspects.

== Remembrance ==
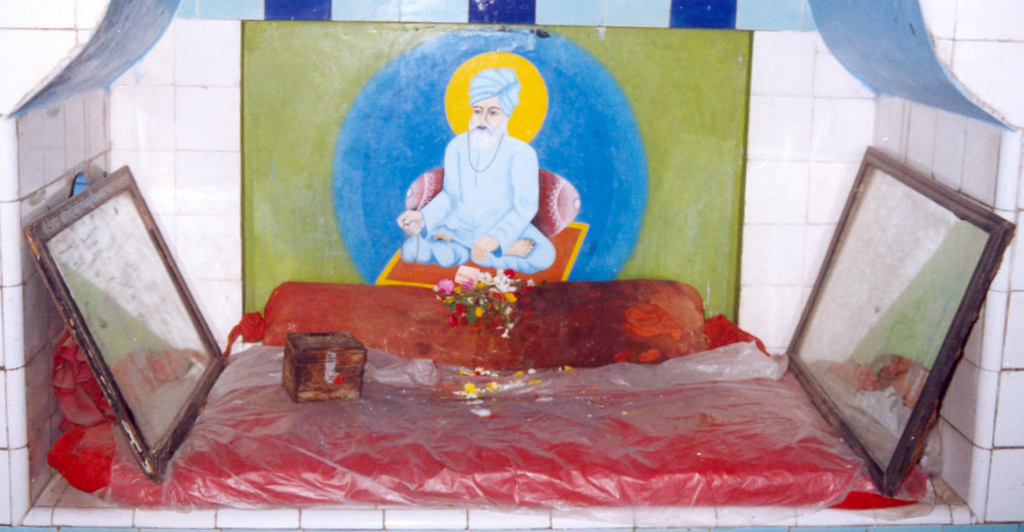
The shrine of Sheikh Muhammad, containing his seat, in his hometown of Shrigonda

Sheikh Muhammad is regarded as a saint-poet by Hindus due to his contributions to the bhakti movement in Maharashtra. The saint-poet Ramdas, a staunch Hindu contemporary saint praises Sheikh Muhammad as a great saint.

Sheikh Muhammad is considered an avatar of the Muslim saint-poet Kabir (c. 1440 – c. 1518). Kabir was a Muslim saint-poet whose patron deity was Rama, a form of Vishnu; while Sheikh Muhammad was a devotee of another form of Vishnu, Vithoba. A Marathi couplet says that the saints Tukaram and Sheikh Muhammad are spiritual successors of Kabir.

The palakhi (palanquin with paduka) of Shiekh Muhammad was included in the annual Pandharpur Wari, a march from Shrigonde to Pandharpur, where Vithoba's main temple stands.
