= Veer Mhaskoba =

Avatar of the Hindu deity Shiva

Coordinates: 18.15294°N 74.087457°E

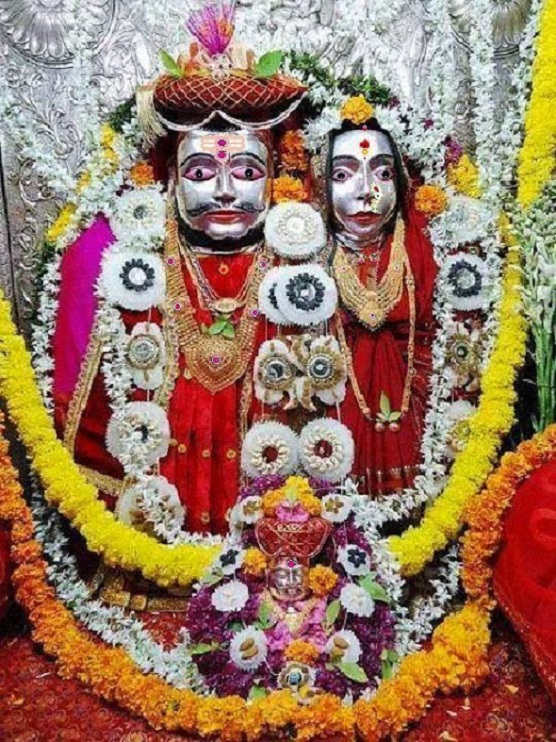

Shreenath Mhaskoba is Kaal bhairava an Avatar of the Hindu deity Shiva.

== Temple ==
The temple of Veer Mhaskoba is in Veer village, on the banks of river Purnaganga.

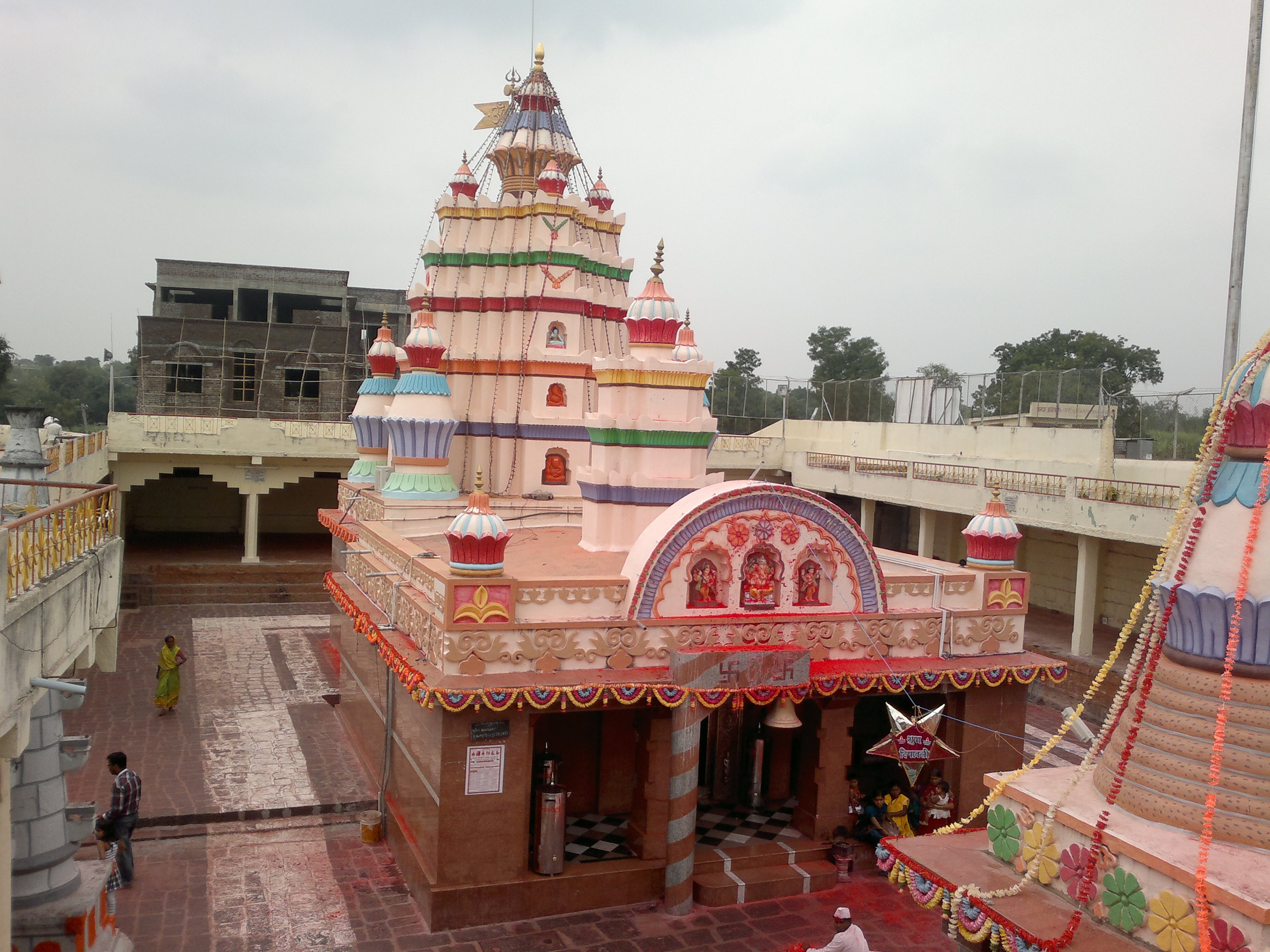
