= Pember =

Pember may refer to:

== Places ==
- Pember, Hampshire

== People ==
- Arthur Pember (1835–1886), British sportsman and journalist
- G. H. Pember (1837–1910), American theologian and author
- Phoebe Pember (1823–1913), American nurse
- Clifford Pember (1924–2020), Welsh World War II veteran
- Ron Pember (1934–2022), English actor, stage director, and dramatist
