= Jejuri (poem) =

Series of poems by Arun Kolatkar

Jejuri is a series of poems written by Indian poet Arun Kolatkar. Consisting of a sequence of 31 poems, Jejuri depicts Kolatkar's visit to Jejuri, a city in Pune, which the poet visited in 1964. It was first published in Opinion Literary Quarterly in 1974, and issued in book-form in 1976. Jejuri won the Commonwealth Poetry Prize in 1977.

The poem is made up of a series of often short fragments which describe the experiences of a secular visitor to the ruins of Jejuri. It is one of the better known poems in modern Indian literature.

== Comments and criticism ==
Jejuri is a sequence of simple but stunningly beautiful poems and is one of the major work in modern Indian literature. The poems are remarkable for their haunting quality. However, modern critics have analysed the difficulty of readers in interpreting the Jejury poems in their proper context. Kolatkar's use of cross-cultural and trans-historical imagery posits Jejuri within a macrocosmic, global framework which forces the reader to adopt an interpretive position not determined by national or cultural preconceptions.

== Bibliography ==
- Chaudhuri, Amit. On Strangeness in Indian Writing. The Hindu, 2005.
- Kolatkar, Arun. Jejuri. Introduction by Amit Chaudhuri. New York Review Books Classics, 2005. ISBN 1-59017-163-2

== See also ==
- Indian poetry
- "Journal of Commonwealth Literature - Review of Jejury"
