= Jejuri =

Town of Pune district in Maharashtra, India

Jejuri Jejurigad
- City
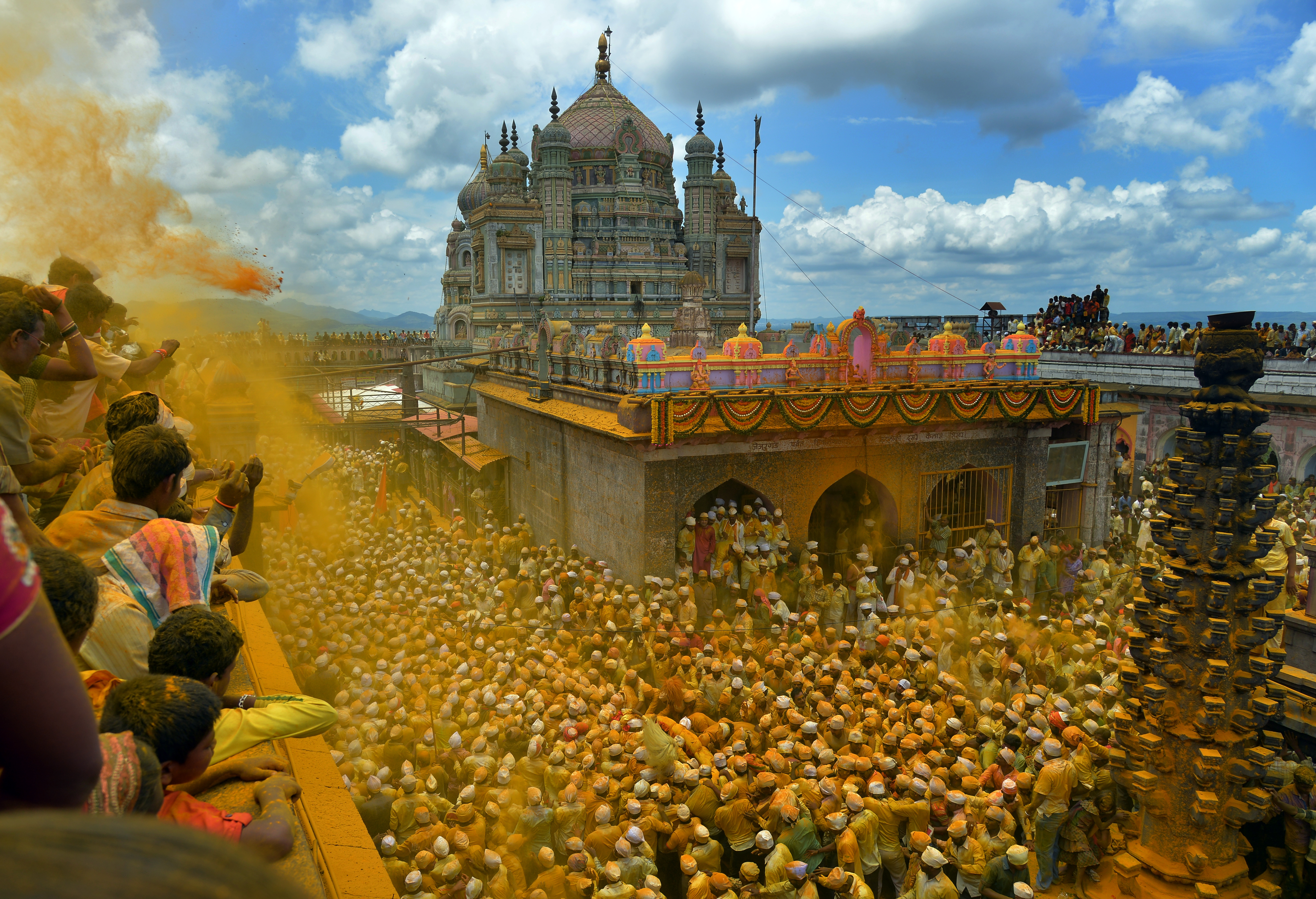
- Devotees during a festival at Khandoba Temple
- Nickname: Khandobachi Jejuri
- Location in Maharashtra, India Jejuri (India)
- Coordinates: 18.275267°N 74.160822°E
- Country: India
- State: Maharashtra
- District: Pune
- Taluka: Purandar

Government
  - Type: Municipal Council
- Elevation: 718 m (2,356 ft)

Population (2011)
  - Total: 14,515
- Demonym: Jejurikar

Official
  - Language: Marathi
- Time zone: UTC+5:30 (IST)
- PIN: 412303
- Telephone code: +91-2115
- Vehicle registration: MH-12, MH-14, MH-42
- Website: www.jejuricity.com

Jejuri (Marathi pronunciation: [d͡ʒed͡zuɾiː]) is a city and a municipal council in the Pune district of Maharashtra, India. Khandoba Mandir is an important Hindu temple to the Hindu Lord Khandoba, one of the most visited tirtha (holy places) in Maharashtra.

Khandoba is a clan god for many Maharashtrian castes and communities, beloved as a god who grants wishes. His wives Mhalsa and Banai represent their caste groups, the Lingayat Vanya of Karnataka and the nomadic shepherds, the Dhangar tribe.

== History ==
In 1739 Chimaji Appa, a general of the Maratha Empire and brother of Peshwa Bajirao, defeated the Portuguese in the Battle of Vasai. After the war, Chimaji Appa and his Maratha soldiers took 38 church bells from there as memorabilia and installed them in 34 Hindu mandirs of Maharashtra. They installed one of these bells in Khandoba's mandir, where it remains to this day.

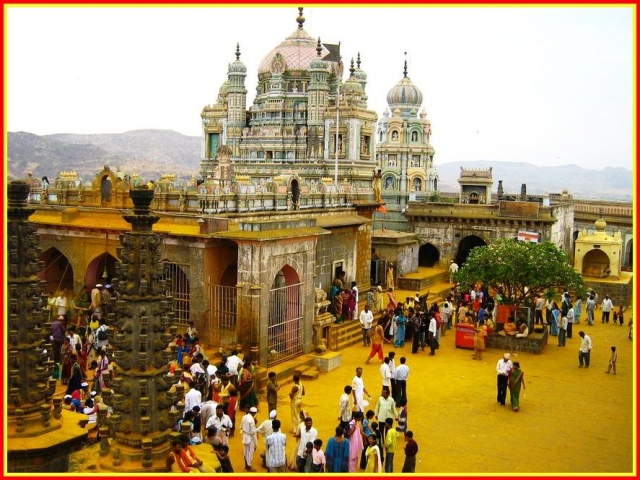
Khandoba temple

=== Koli Naiks ===
The Koli brothers Naik Hari Makati and Naik Tatya Makaji were revolutionaries from Maharashtra who revolted against the British Hukumat. With Naik Rama Krishna of Kalambai, they raised an army of Ramoshis from Satara and revolted. In 1879, their Ramoshi army raided Poona fifteen times, then Satara many times after that. In February 1879, Naik Hari Makaji attacked a portion of Bhimthadi in Baramati. On the eighth raid into Baramati, Naik Hari Makaji was attacked by British police, but escaped, fighting hand to hand with two British policemen. He wounded them, but two Ramoshis were captured. At the beginning of March, Hari Makaji again rose, revolted and raided Indapur and raided, but was captured in Solapur in mid-March. Tatya Makaji led his revolution until the end of the year, raiding villages on the Purandar and Sinhagad ranges.

On 17 October, Koli Naik Tatya Makaji and some of his followers killed a Ramoshi who was an informer for British Major Wise. After that, Tatya Makaji Naik was brought to justice.

== Geography ==
Jejuri is located at 18.28°N 74.17°E. It has an average elevation of 718 metres

== Demographics ==
As of 2011 India census, Jejuri had a population of 14,515. Males constitute 51% of the population and females 49%. Jejuri has an average literacy rate of 73%, higher than the national average of 59.5%: male literacy is 79%, and female literacy is 67%. In Jejuri, 14% of the population is under 6 years of age.

== Khandoba mandir ==
The Khandoba temple is located in Jejuri, which lies to the southeast of Pune in Maharashtra. The town is known for one of the most revered temples in the state, the Khandobachi Jejuri. The temple is dedicated to Khandoba, also known as Mhalsakant or Malhari Martand or Mylaralinga. Khandoba is regarded as the 'God of Jejuri' and is held in great reverence by the Dhangars. The temple was the site of a historic treaty between Tarabai and Balaji Bajirao on 14 September 1752.

Every Somavati Amavasya (new moon that falls on a Monday), devotees of Khandoba gather at the Jejuri temple with tonnes of turmeric, smearing it on each other and throwing it around amid energetic singing and dancing. The temple-town is known as ‘Sonyachi Jejuri’ (golden Jejuri) because of this colourful celebration.

Jejuri Khandoba Temple can be easily divided into two separate sections - the Mandap and Garbhagriha.

== In popular culture ==
- Some scenes of the Bollywood film Naya Daur (1957) starring Dilip Kumar were filmed on the premises of Khandoba mandir and the surrounding hilltop. The Ana he to aa song of this film was also entirely filmed at this mandir, while some inside shots were filmed at a sound stage.
- Carry On Maratha (2015) - The Malhari Martand song of this film was shot at the Khandoba mandir. It was picturised by Gashmeer Mahajani.
- Jejuri (poem) by Arun Kolatkar was based on this village and its deity.

== Gallery ==
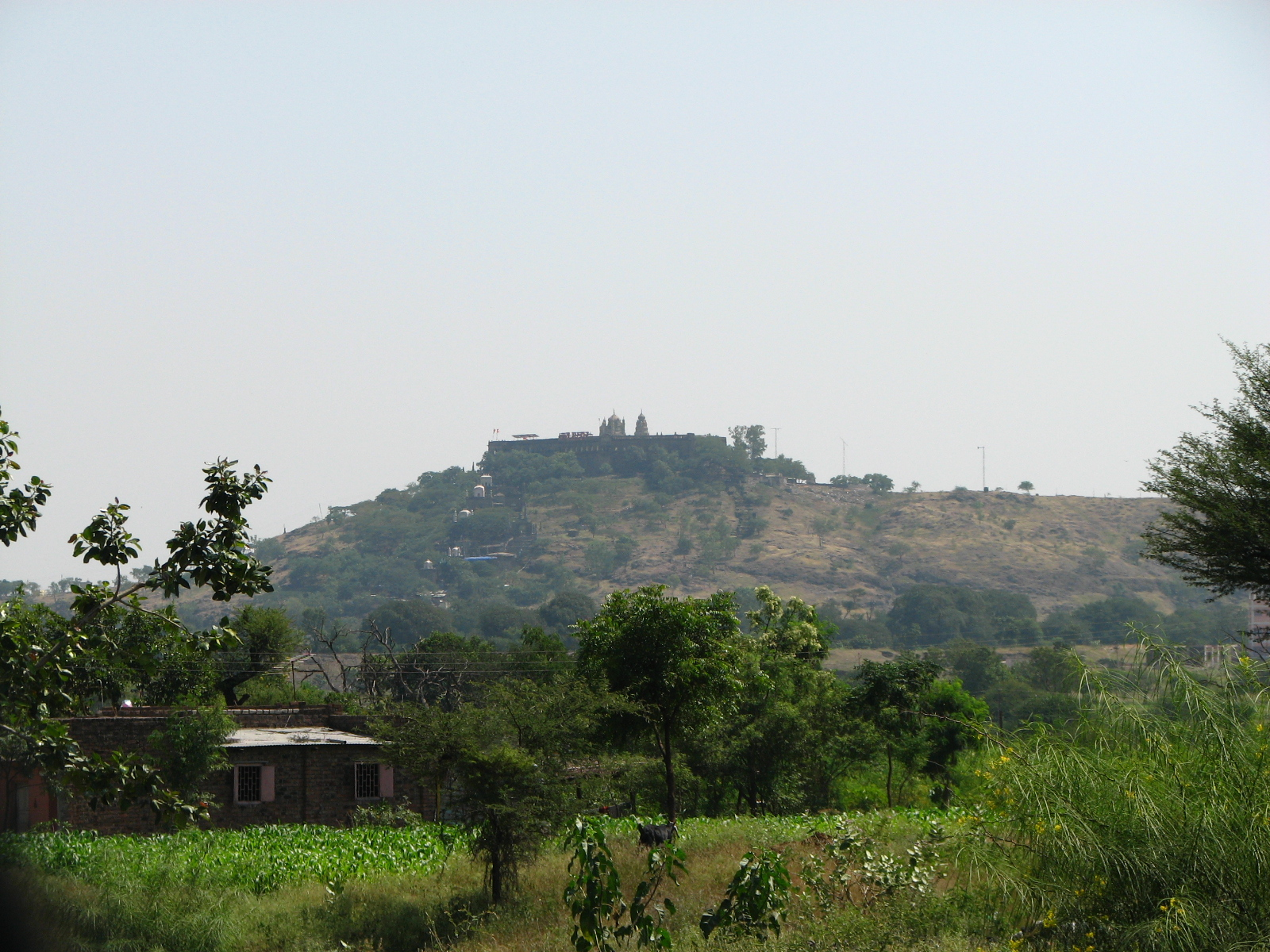
Long shot of Jejurigad's mandir on mountain

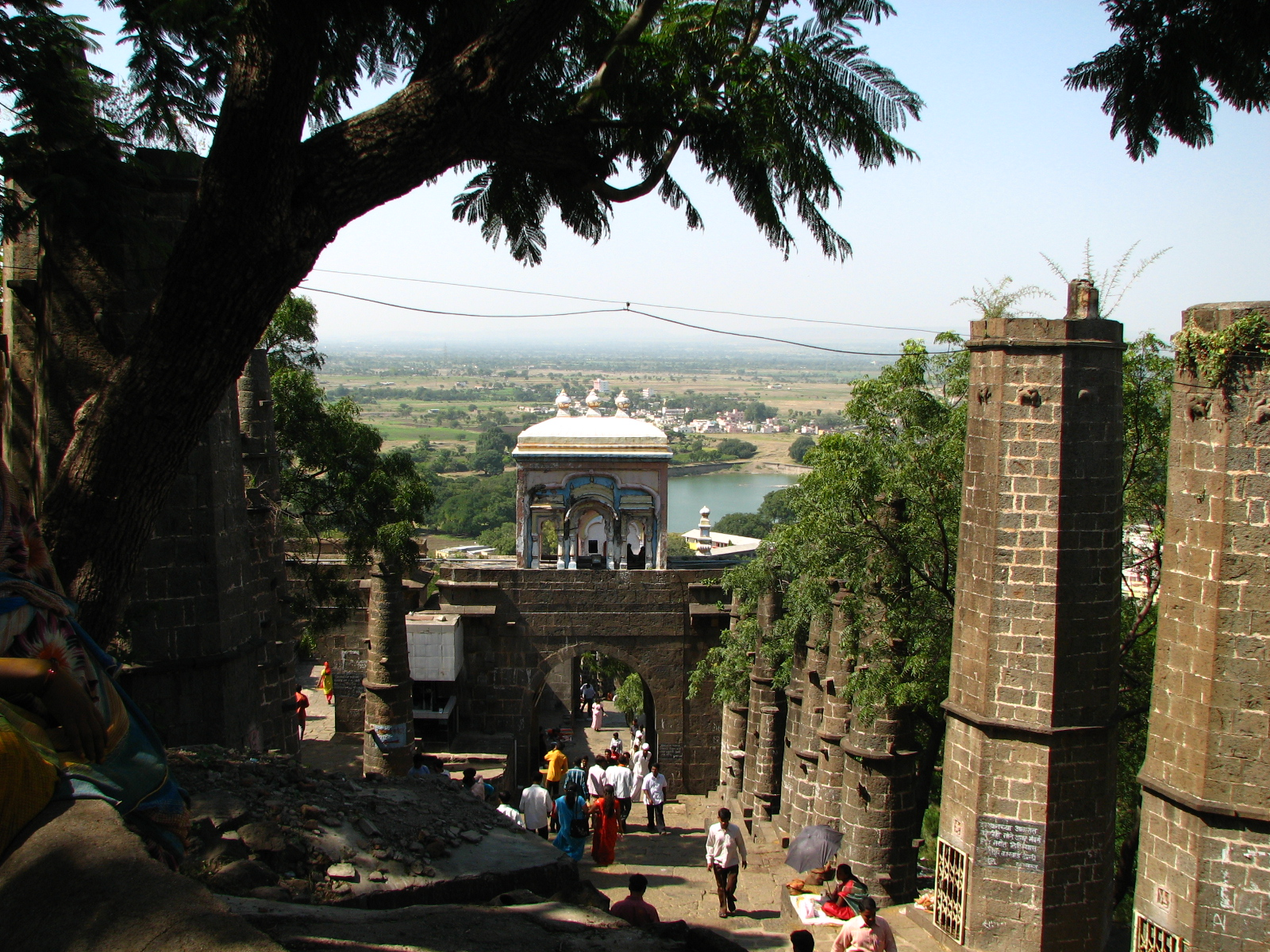
Stairs with arched entrance of the Jejuri Khandoba mandir

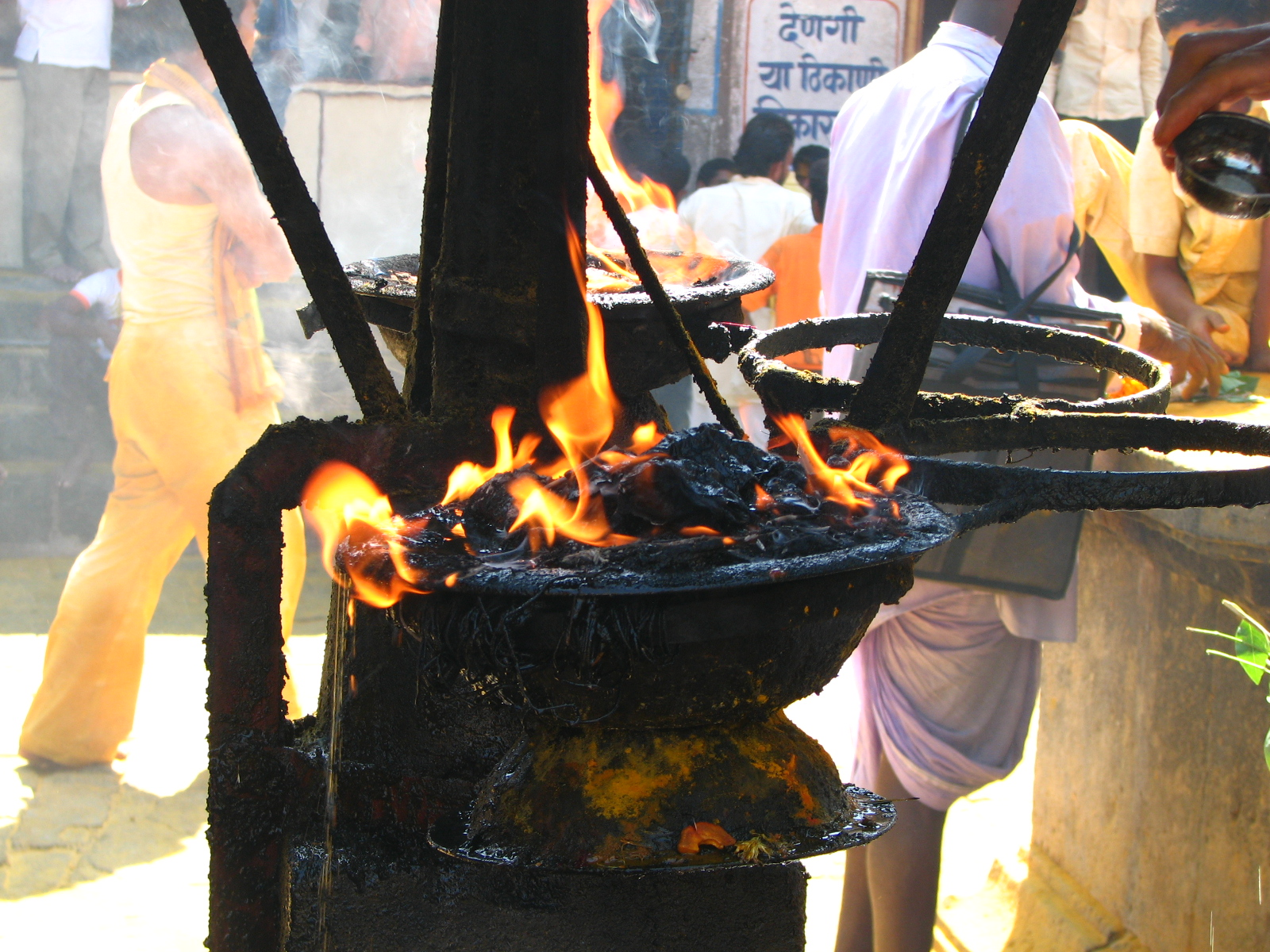
Sacred fire (Jyoti) in front of the Khandoba temple.

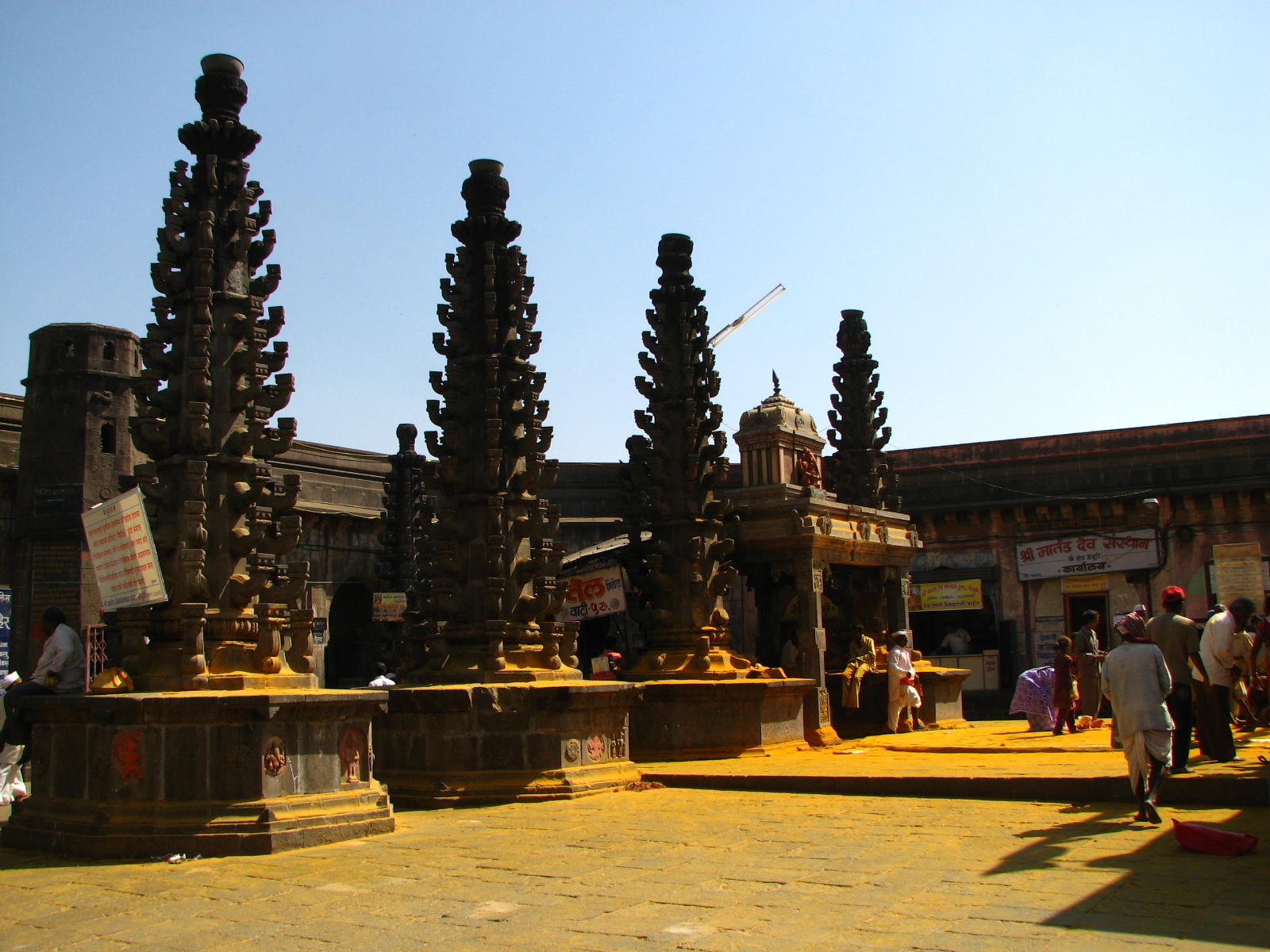
Deepstambha in front of the temple

oral history of Murali tradition at Jejuri pilgrimage

== Bibliography ==
- Günter-Dietz Sontheimer: Some Incidents in the History of the Khandoba. In: Asie du Sud. Traditions et changements. VIth European Conference on Modern South Asian Studies 1973. Hrsg. von M. Gaborieau u. A. Thorner, Paris 1979, S. 11–117.
