= Mhalsa =

Hindu goddess

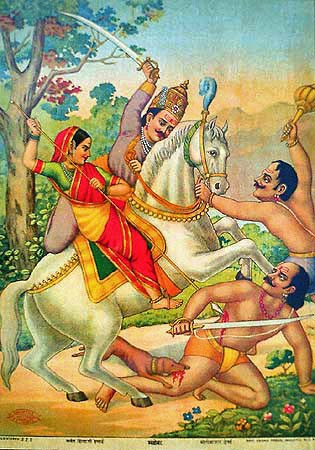
- Khandoba and Mhalsa killing demons Mani-Malla — a popular oleograph, c.1880.
- Devanagari: म्हाळसा, महालसा
- Sanskrit transliteration: Mhāḷasā
- Affiliation: Avatar of Mohini; Parvati (in Khandoba Sect)
- Weapon: Trishula
- Consort: Khandoba (when identified with Parvati)

Mhalsa (Marathi: म्हाळसा IAST: Mhāḷasā), also spelled as Mhalasa or Mahalasa, महालसा is a Hindu goddess. As an independent goddess, she is worshipped as a form of Mohini, the avatar of Vishnu. Meanwhile in the Khandoba sect of Maharashtra, she is worshipped as the consort of the folk deity Khandoba, a form of Shiva. In this tradition, she is associated with Parvati, Shiva's wife.

Mhalsa's chief temple is at Mardol in Mardol, Goa, where she is worshipped as a form of Vishnu revered as Mahalasa Narayani. She is worshipped as the Kuladevi (family goddess) of different castes and communities in the region.

== Iconography ==
In the Mahalasa Narayani form, Mahalasa has four hands, carrying a trishula, a sword, a severed head, and a drinking bowl. She also wears the yajnopavita (sacred thread), which is generally dedicated to male deities. She stands on a prostrate man or demon, as a tiger or lion licks blood dripping from the severed head. Goud Saraswat Brahmins and Daivajnya Brahmins as well as Vaishnavas from Goa and Tulunadu identify her with Mohini and call her Narayani and Rahu-matthani, the slayer of Rahu, as told in the Bhavishya Purana.

Mhalsa is often depicted with two arms and accompanying Khandoba on his horse or standing beside him.

== Legends ==
According to a folk legend, Mhalsa is considered to be a form of Shiva's wife, Parvati. As per this legend, Mhalsa was born as the daughter of a rich Lingayat merchant called Timmaseth. On the divine orders of Khandoba in a dream to her father, Mhalsa was married to Khandoba on Pausha Pournima (the full moon day of the Hindu calendar month of Pausha) in Pali (Pembar). Two shiva lingams appeared on this occasion. An annual festival marking this event is celebrated in Pali every Pausha Pournima.

== Worship ==
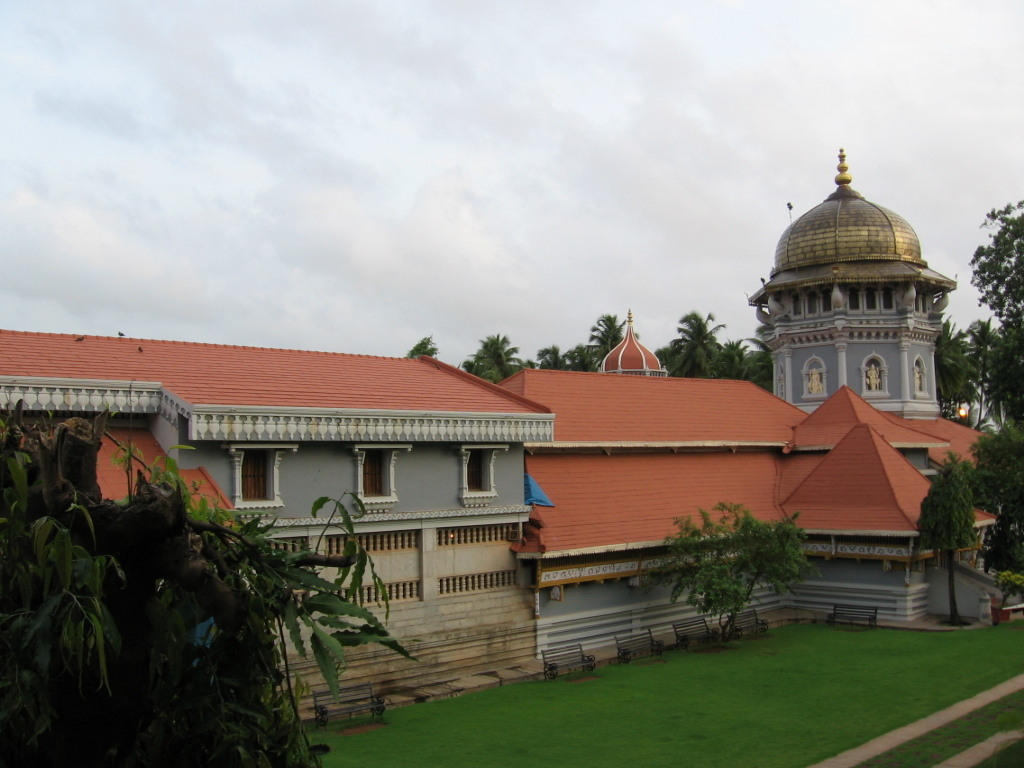
Mardol Temple in Goa

Mahalasa/Mhalsa is worshipped as an independent goddess or gramadevata (village guardian deity). Her chief temples stand in Mardol in Goa. Her temples also exist in the states of Karnataka, Kerala, and Gujarat. She is the Kuldevi (family goddess) of many Hindus from western and southern India, including Goud Saraswat Brahmins, Karhade Brahmins, Padye Brahmin, Daivajna Brahmin, Kalavant, Bhandaris and many other communities.

Due to the migration of followers of the goddess, new temples have been established in recent years in Verna, Karwar, Kumta, Mudgeri, Kundapura, Basruru, Shirva, Mangaluru, Kasargod, Harikhandige, Malpe, Madangeri (a small town near Gokarna) and other places along India's west coast.

Mhalsa is also worshipped as the consort of Khandoba in Maharashtra and the reincarnation of Goddess Parvati. She is worshipped with Khandoba in all centres of Khandoba's worship, including Jejuri in Maharashtra.
