= Shanta Durga Temple =

Hindu Temple in Goa

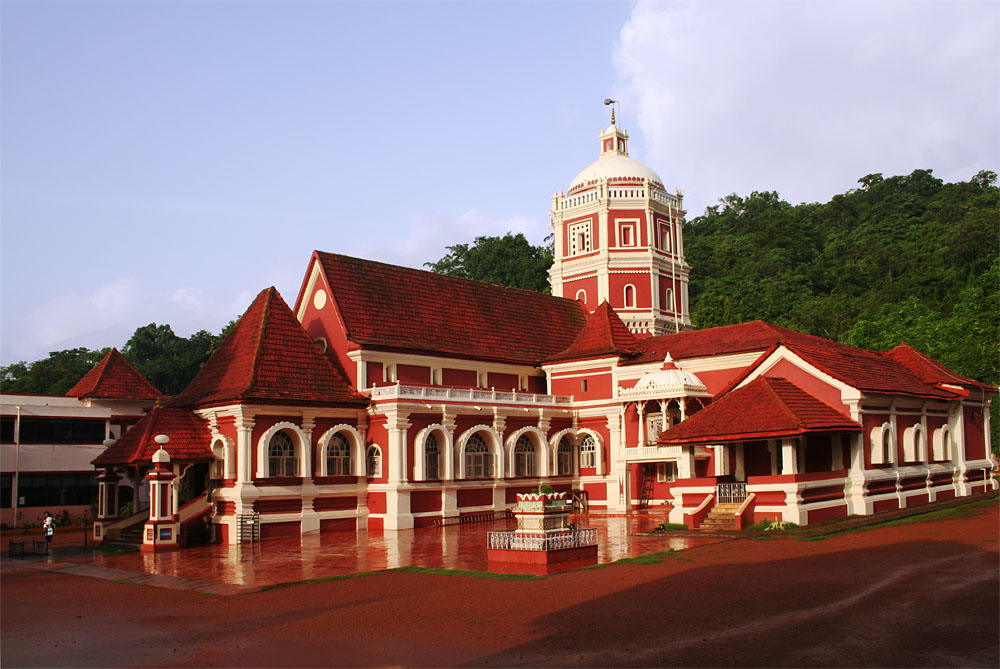
- ShantaDurga Temple, Kavale, Goa

- Location in Goa

Religion
- Affiliation: Hinduism
- Deity: Shantadurga
- Festivals: Magh Shuddha Panchmi (Jatrautsav), Navaratri, 5 Mahapanchmi.

Location
- Location: Kavale, Ponda, South Goa
- State: Goa
- Country: India
- Coordinates: 15.3958323°N 73.9677682°E

Architecture
- Established: 1738

Website
- shreeshantadurga.com

Shri Shantadurga Temple is a Hindu temple, located 30 km (19 mi) from Panaji at the foothill of Kavalem village in Ponda Taluka, Goa, India. Shrimad Swamiji of Kavale Math is spiritual head of Shree Shantadurga Saunsthan, Kavale (Shrimat Shivananda Saraswati Swami Gauḍapādāchārya of Shri Kavale Math is spiritual chief Of Shree Shantadurga Saunsthan).

Shree Shantadurga is the Kuldevi (family deity) of many Goud Saraswat Brahman (Saraswat KuldevDevasthan). On 4 December 2016, (Margashirsh Shuddh Panchmi). Shree Shantadurga Devasthan, Kavale has completed its 450th year of existence.

== Deity ==
The temple is dedicated to Shantadurga, the goddess who mediates between Vishnu and Shiva. The deity is also called 'Santeri' colloquially. Purana talks of a battle between Shiva and Vishnu The battle was so fierce that the God Brahma prayed to Goddess Adishakti Parvati to intervene, which she did in the form of Shantadurga. Shantadurga placed Vishnu on her right hand and Shiva on her left hand and settled the fight.

Shantadurga is holding two serpents, one in each hand, representing Vishnu and Shiva.

== Temple ==
The original temple at Quelossim (Keloshi) in Salcete was destroyed by the Portuguese in 1566. The goddess was shifted to Kavalem and worship was continued there. The site on which the original Temple of Shantadurga stood at Quelossim (Keloshi) is known as "Deoolbhata" and it is in the possession of the Shree Shantadurga Saunsthan Committee, Kavale. The current temple was constructed during the reign of Maratha Empire Chattrapati Shahu Maharaj of Satara during the period from 1713 AD to 1738 AD. Naroram Mantri (Rege) originally from Kochara village in the Vengurla Taluka,(Konkan) was a Mantri (Minister) in Chattrapati Shahu Maharaj (Grandson of Chh.Shivaji Maharaj & Son of Dharmaveer Chh.Sambhaji Maharaj) Ashtapradhan Mandal at Satara Due to his efforts, the village of Kavalem was bequeathed to the Temple by Shrimant Baji Rao I Peshwa in 1738. The Temple reconstruction started around 1730s.

The temple complex is on the slope of the foothills of a mountain chain, surrounded by lush vegetation. There is a main temple and three smaller temples of other deities, which have been built on three sides of the temple. The temple consists of a collection of pyramidal roofs with a dome. The pillars and floors are made of Kashmir stone. The temple has a huge tank, a Deep Jyoti Stambh and agrashalas (guest houses).

Many renovations have been completed over the years to the main temple and the temples of the other deities as well as to the agrashala. The temple has recently banned entry of foreigners, into the temple citing objectionable dressing and conduct as the reason.

== Architectural styles ==
This Temple is built in Saraswat Architectural style.

== Gallery ==
Entrance to the Shri ShantaDurga Saunsthan.

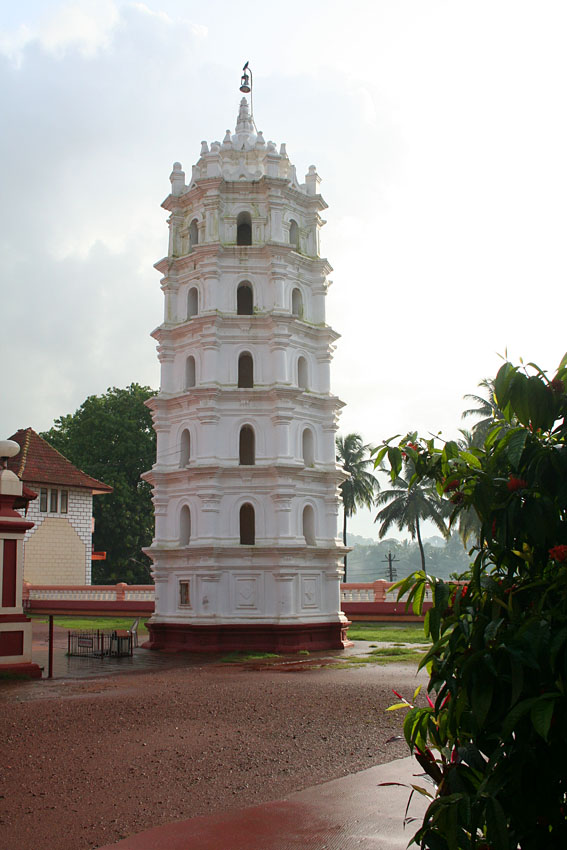
The Deepa Stambha of the temple

Shanta Durga Temple Complex Lake

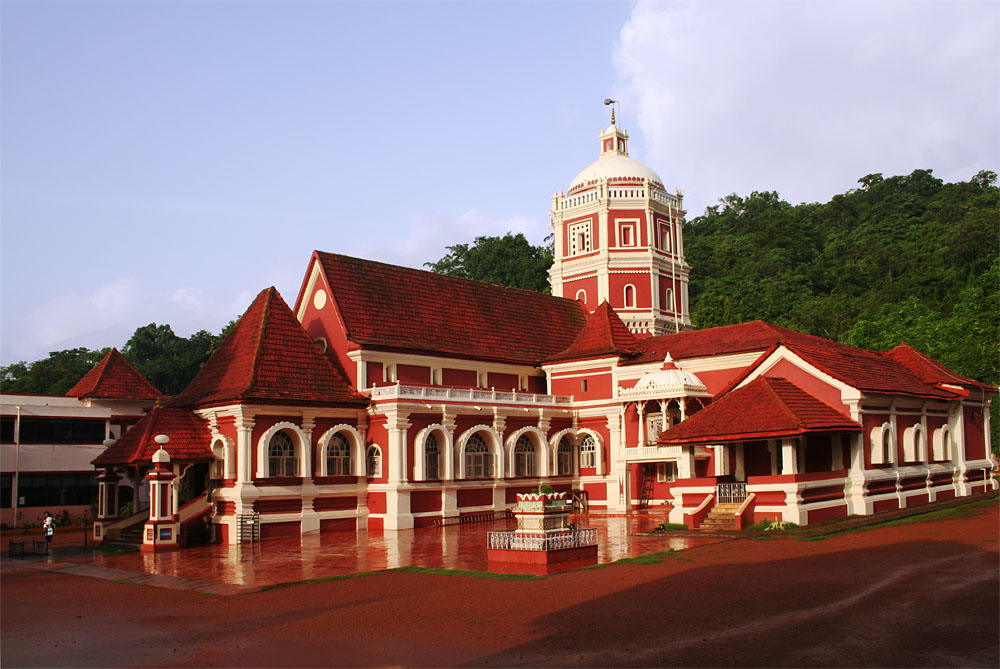
Shanta Durga Temple

Shanta Durga Temple - Majestic Deepa Stambha (Lamp Tower)

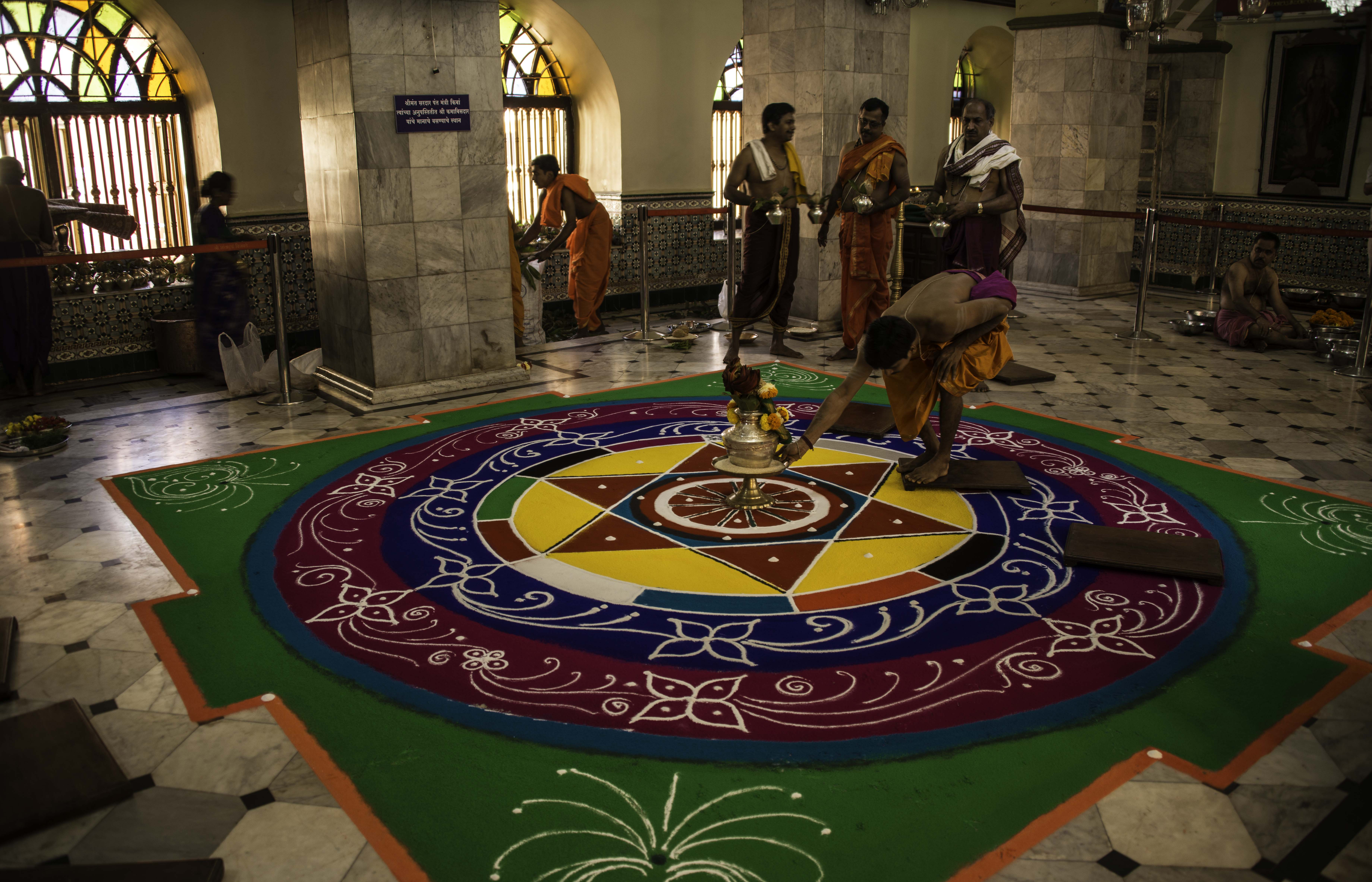
An Elaborate Rangoli inside the Temple during Shatakalash puja.

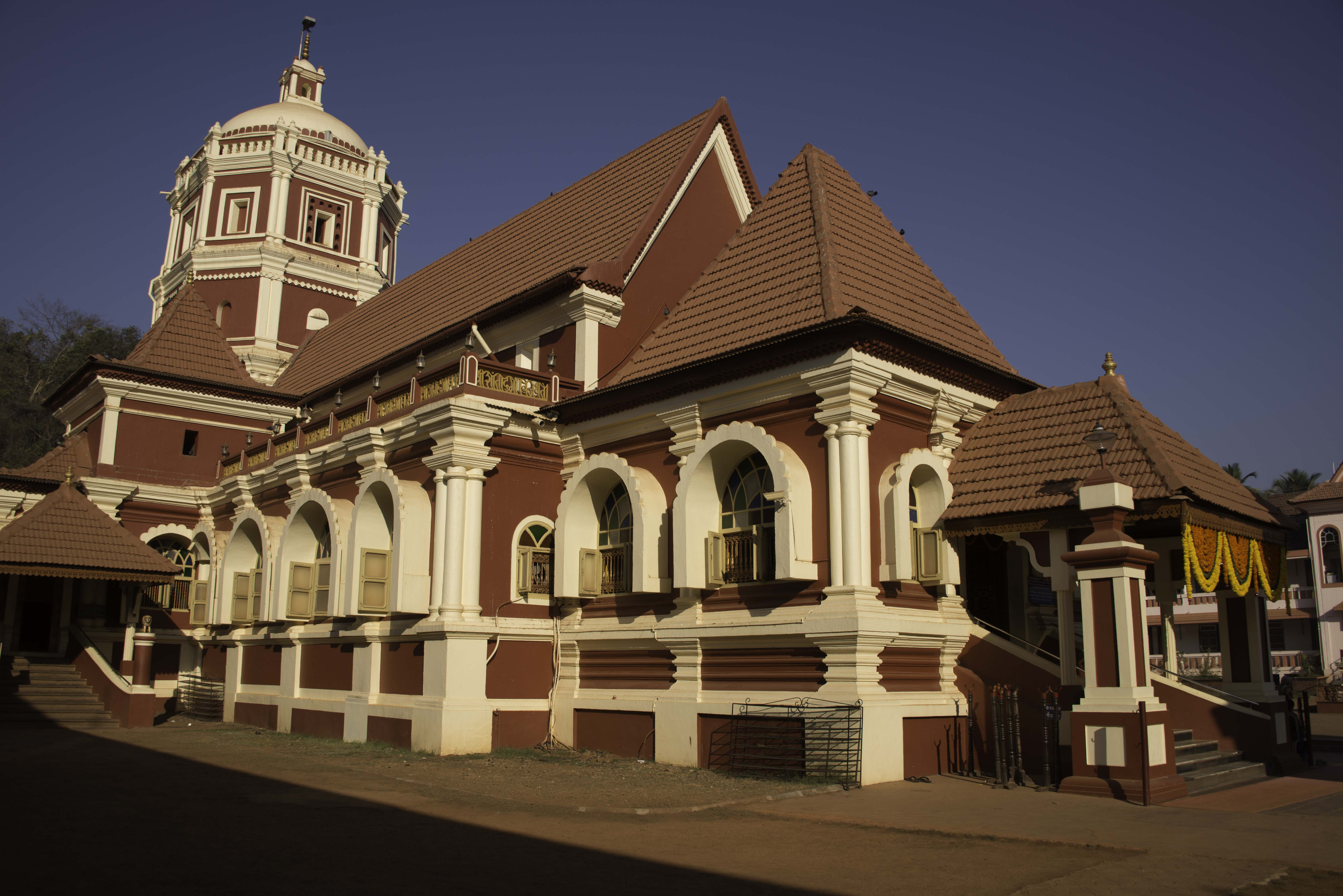
Shri Shantadurga Temple from front

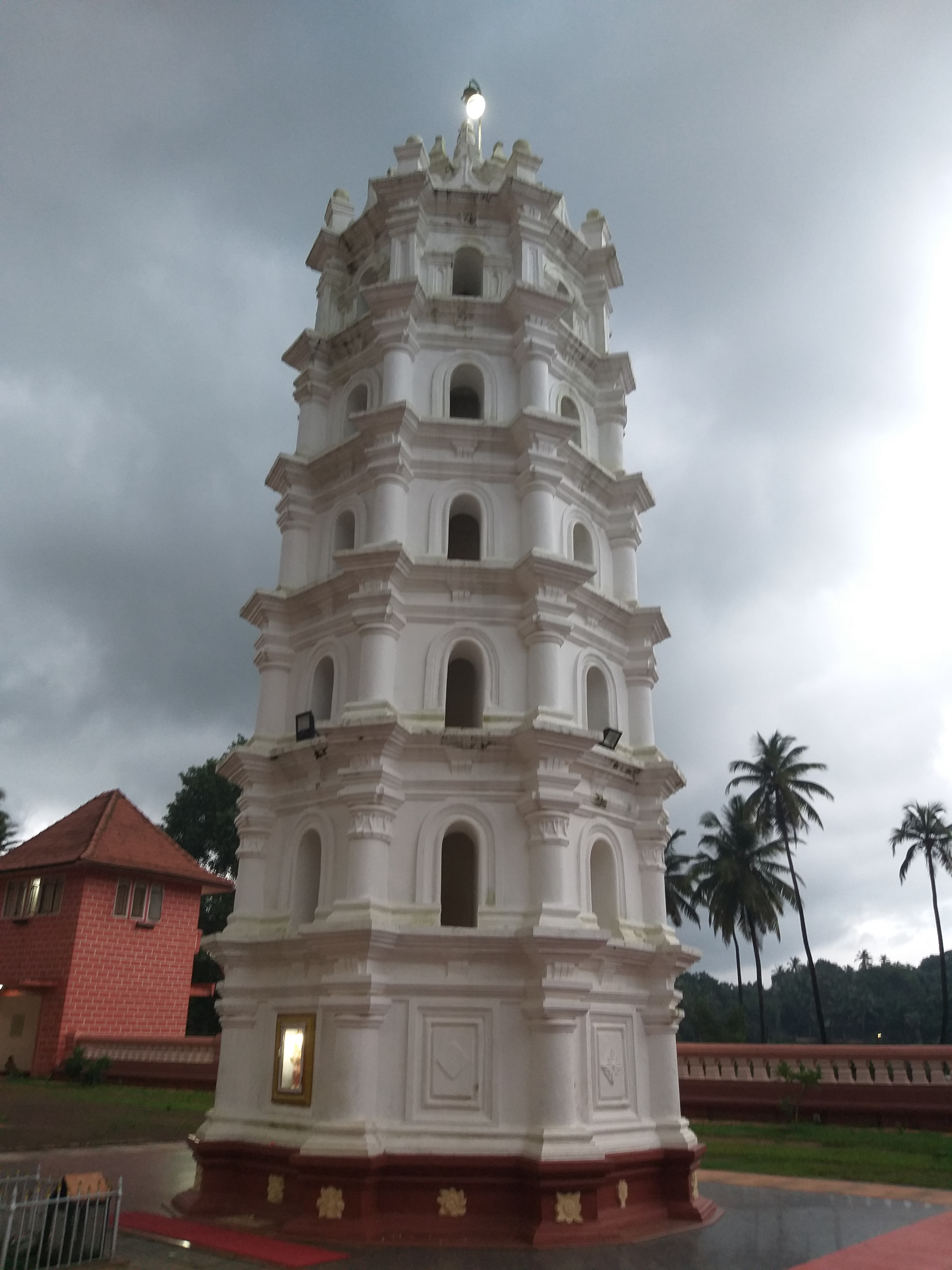
Deepastambha at Shri Shantadurga Temple

== See also ==
- Mangueshi Temple
- Temples of Goa
- Shri Gaudapadacharya Math
- Kavale
- Mangeshi Village
- Shantadurga Kalangutkarin Temple
- 17th-century Western domes
