= Vaishya Vani =

Sub-caste of Vaishyas, one of the varnas of Hinduism

Vaishya Vani is a sub-caste of Vaishyas, one of the varnas of Hinduism. In the Gujarat state and the Daman territory, they are also known as AryaVaishya or Vaishya wani Vanik. In Uttara Kannada districts of Karwar and Ankola, they are called as Vaishya Vani, or Vani.their mother tongue is Konkani which they speak among themselves in the states of Gujarat, Karnataka, Goa and Maharashtra.

== History ==
During the period of the Kadambas of Goa, they were known as Banajigas (merchants) who were engaged in trade. The reference to these Banajigas from Savoi-Verem, Narve, Khandepar, Kapilagram, Bandivade and Taligram are mentioned in Khandepar copper plate of 1358 CE. Now they are proclaimed with various names like Vaishya Vani, Hindu Vani or Vani.

== Social status ==
OBC status was given to Vaishya Vanis in 2008 in Maharashtra, which was later removed in 2011. At present, certain sections of the sub-caste can avail OBC status based on historical considerations. However, the sub-caste is not listed in the Central List for the State of Maharahstra.

== See also ==
- Vanika
- Chettiar
