= Gaudapadacharya Math =

Matha in Goa, India

Shree Saunsthan Gaudapdacharya Math
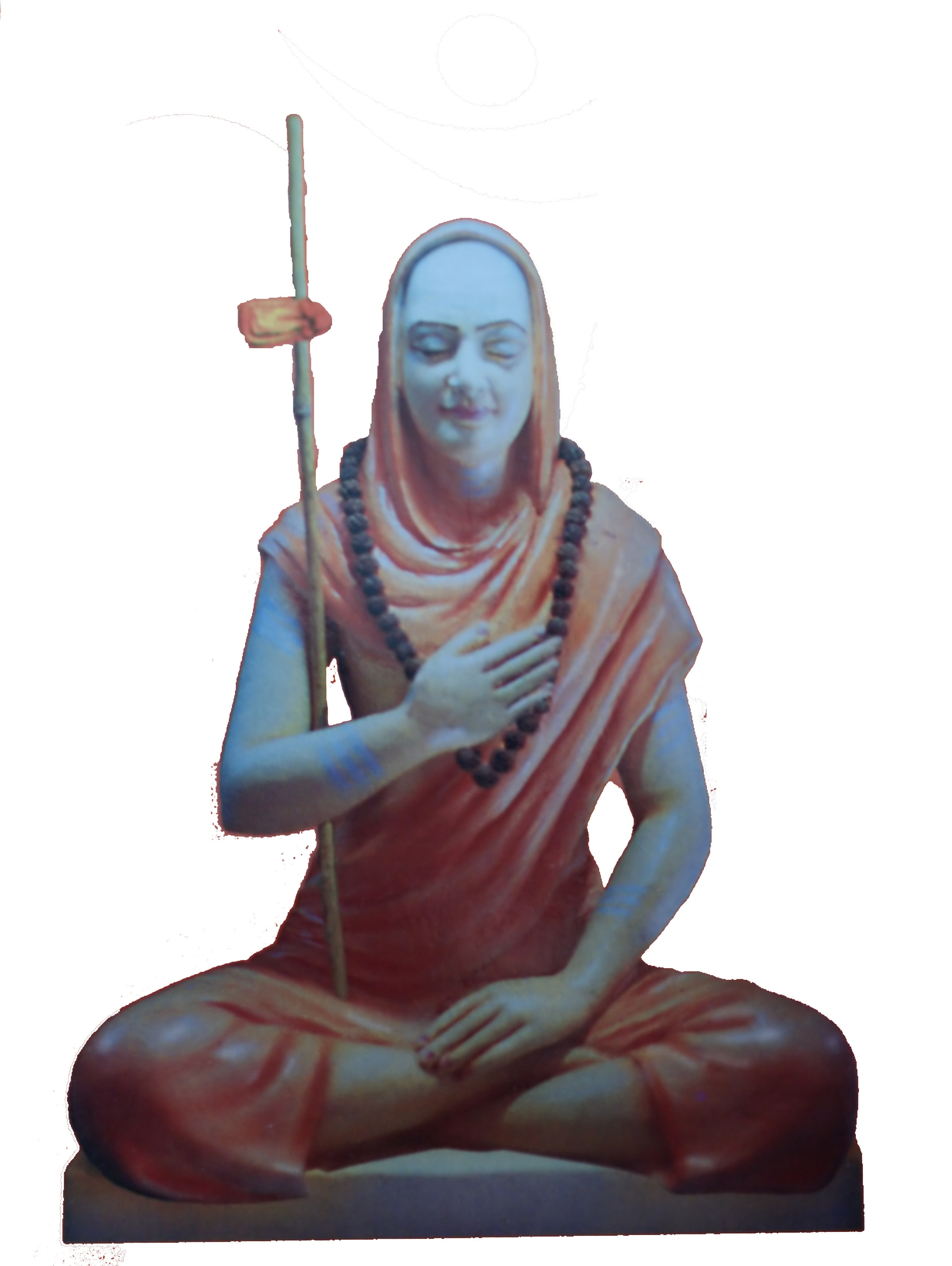
- Gauḍapāda, the grand guru of Adi Shankara and the first historical exponent of Advaita Vedanta, also believed to be the founder of Śrī Sansthāna Gauḍapadācārya Maṭha.
- Formation: c. 499 BCE
- Founder: Gauḍapāda
- Religion: Hinduism
- Philosophy: Advaita Vedanta
- Followers: Smartha Goud Saraswat Brahmin.
- Main Math: Kavale, Ponda, Goa.

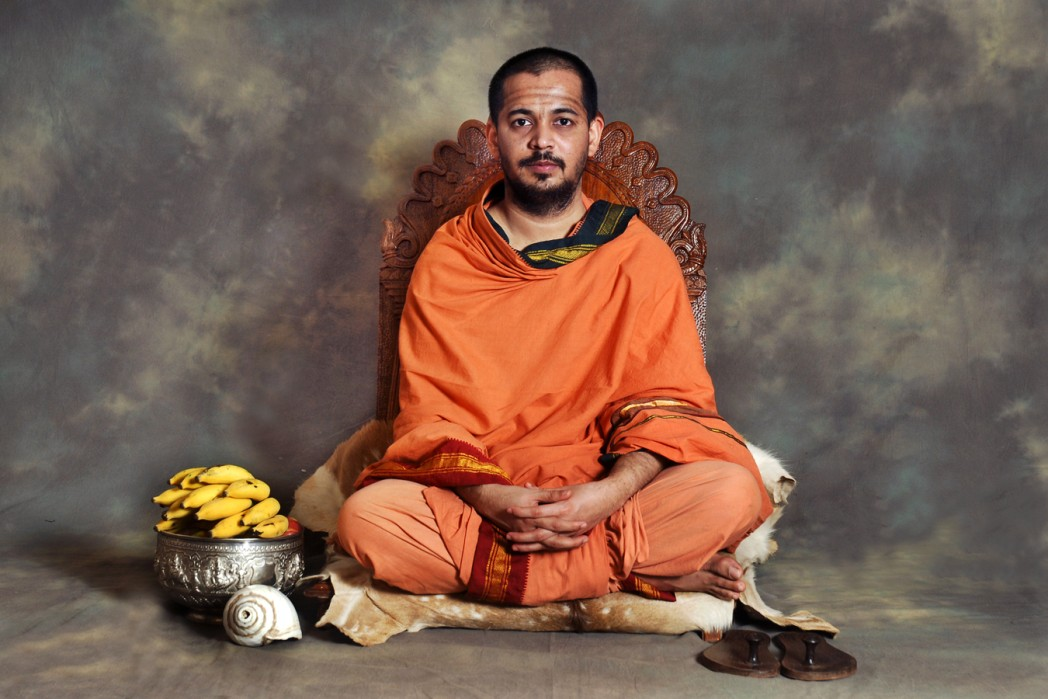
Present 77th Peetadipathi: Shrimat Shivananda Saraswati Swami Gauḍapādāchārya.

Shri Gaudapadacharya Math (Sanskrit: श्री संस्थान गौडपदाचार्य मठ, Śrī Sansthāna Gauḍapadācārya Maṭha), also known as Kavaḷē maṭha (कवळे मठ), located in Kavale, Ponda, Goa, is the oldest matha of the Smarthan Gaud Saraswat Brahmin community. It was founded by Gauḍapāda around 499 BCE, whose student was Govinda Bhagavatpada, the guru of Adi Shankara, a highly influential figure in Hinduism. There is also a belief that Gauḍapāda himself established the Shri Gaudapadacharya matha when he lived in Gomantak (Goa). Thus, the matha came to be known as Shri Saunstan Gaudapadacharya matha. Unlike other mathas, Shri Gaudapadacharya matha is not a polemical center established to influence the faith of all Hindus, its jurisdiction is limited to only Dakshinatya Saraswat Brahmins. The Peetadhipathi "head monk" is Śrī Gauḍapadācārya. Hindu Shaiv, Smarth Sampradayi, and Goud Saraswat Brahmin Samaj are its main disciples.

== History ==
Śrī Sansthāna Gauḍapadācārya Maṭha was founded in 499 BCE at Kushasthali near Keloshi (Quelshim) in Goa by Shri Vivaranananda Saraswati, who along with Adi Shankara was a disciple of Govinda Bhagavatpada, who in turn was Gaudapada's disciple. There is also belief among people that the matha was established by Gaudapada.

During the Portuguese rule in Goa in 15th and 16th century, Hindus were forcibly converted to Christianity, and many Hindu temples and mathas were destroyed. In 1564, the Gaudapadacharya matha at Keloshi was destroyed by the Portuguese. Challenged by the Portuguese atrocities, to safeguard the tradition, legacy of the matha and the Sanatan Dharma, 57th guru Shrimat Purnananda Saraswati Swami Gowdapadacharya had to leave Goa and find shelter at the Golvan matha ashram. 58th Guru Shrimat Sahajananda Saraswati Swami Gauḍapādāchārya and 59th Guru Shrimat Vidyananda Saraswati Swami Gauḍapādāchārya also stayed at the Golvan matha. 60th Guru Shrimat Ramananda Saraswati Swami Gauḍapādāchārya stayed in Chinder matha. 61st Guru Shrimat Sadananda Saraswati Swami Gauḍapādāchārya left for Varanasi along with his disciple the 62nd Guru Shrimat Bhavananda Saraswati Swami Gauḍapādāchārya, as the hostile situation in Goa did not improve for Hindus.

Later as the peace returned to Goa, Shri Vittal Shyama Sharma Shenavi Ranganekar of Kaundinya Gotra from Kushasthali along with a group of Saraswats went to Varanasi to persuade the 62nd Guru to return to Goa from Varanasi. During those times, it used to take 6 months or more to reach Varanasi and return to Goa. The guru listened to the plea's to return to Goa, but politely refused to oblige due to his old age and his desire to spend his remaining life in sacred place of Varanasi, abode of god Shiva. This forced the group of people to return to Goa; however, Ranganekar decided to remain with the guru and serve him in order to get some more time to persuade him to return to Goa. Unrelenting, Ranganekar later one day threatened to go on fast-unto-death if the guru would not return to Goa. When several requests of the guru to Ranganekar to reverse his decision did not yield any results, in presence of several important Hindu religious leaders and Sants and Sadhus of Varanasi, performed the religious rituals and gave Sanyasa deeksha to Ranganekar and made him his disciple and renamed him Shrimat Sachidananda Saraswati Swami Gauḍapādāchārya.

After giving diksha, Shri Bhavananda Saraswati ordered Shri Sachidananda Saraswati to return to Goa and perform the duties of dharma guru of Saraswats according to the Śrī Sansthāna Gauḍapadācārya Maṭha's tradition. In his journey, on the way to Goa Shri Sachidananda Saraswati Swamiji was felicitated and assisted to make his journey comfortable by the kings and general public. Mean time news of Ranganekar taking sannyasa diksha spread among Saraswat Brahmins in Goa, but some people refused to believe that as truth which led to division of Saraswat Brahmins into 2 groups.

There was couple of reasons why people refused to believe because as per the tradition, only a brahmacharin can take sannyasa diksha and Ranganekar was a Grihastha and the sannyasa diksa was not performed in presence of the disciples from Goa. So some people believed that Ranganekar is trying to enjoy the special status and power of being Peetadipathi and thereby own the property of the matha. Moreover, Shrimat Sachidananda Saraswati Swami Gauḍapādāchārya was not carrying any documents signed by Shri Bhavananda Saraswati authenticating his new status.

All these developments forced Shrimat Sachidananda Saraswati swami Gauḍapādāchārya to return to Varanasi in mid-way and appraised Shrimat Bhavananda Saraswati Swami Gauḍapādāchārya about the situation. Then Shrimat Bhavananda Saraswati Swami Gauḍapādāchārya invited the religious leaders of Varanasi to a gathering at Mukthi Mantap to discuss the matter and wrote a letter stating that Shri Sachidananda Saraswati swamij Gauḍapādāchārya was indeed his disciple and Uttaradhikari of Shri Saunstan Gauḍapādāchārya matha in Goa and he would be the spiritual guru of Saraswat Brahmins of Gomantak region and which was signed along with other religious leaders gathered there and handed over to Shrimat Sachidananda Saraswati Swami Gauḍapādāchārya.

Shrimat Sachidananda Saraswati Swami Gauḍapādāchārya then decided to stay few more days with his guru Shrimat Bhavananda Saraswati Swami Gauḍapādāchārya in Varanasi and later returns to Goa where a grand welcome awaited him and he stayed in Sonavade Matha in Ratnagiri.

As peace prevailed in Goa region, in 1630 new Matha building was built in Kavale, Ponda, Goa, which in those days was a part of Sonde Kingdom, under Hindu rule. The land for this matha was gifted by then ruler Shri Basavalinga Soundha. After the Math building was built, Shrimat Satchidananda Saraswati Swami Gauḍapādāchārya who was staying in Sonavade matha moved to this new matha and became the first Peetadhipathi to stay in this matha and it was made the headquarters of the Shri Saunstan Gauḍapādāchārya Matha.

=== Other Saraswat mathas ===
Smartha Saraswats who flourished on the banks of the River Saraswati in the Himalayan region, north of Kurukshetra were forced to migrate southward initially because of the drying up of the sacred river and subsequently due to the repeated assaults made by Muslim invaders. The elders of this group of Smartha Saraswats offered penance at the banks of the Kotiteerth in Gokarna and were blessed with a Guru - Pujya Parijnanashram I and founded the Shri Chitrapur Math in 1708.

Since the matha was established, all Dakshinatya or southern Saraswat Brahmins were the disciples of this matha and all Saraswat Brahmins were followers of Smartism. In the 12th century A.D. Madhvacharya propagated the Dvaita philosophy and promoted Bhakti movement centred around god Krishna which gave fillip to Vaishnava sect and a large section of Saraswat Brahmins converted to Vaishnavism. Later in 1476 A.D. Gokarna Math and in 1542 A.D. Kashi Math was founded under Vaishnava sampradaya and those Saraswat Brahmin converts to Vaishnavism started following these new mathas.

== Shree Gaudapadacharya ==
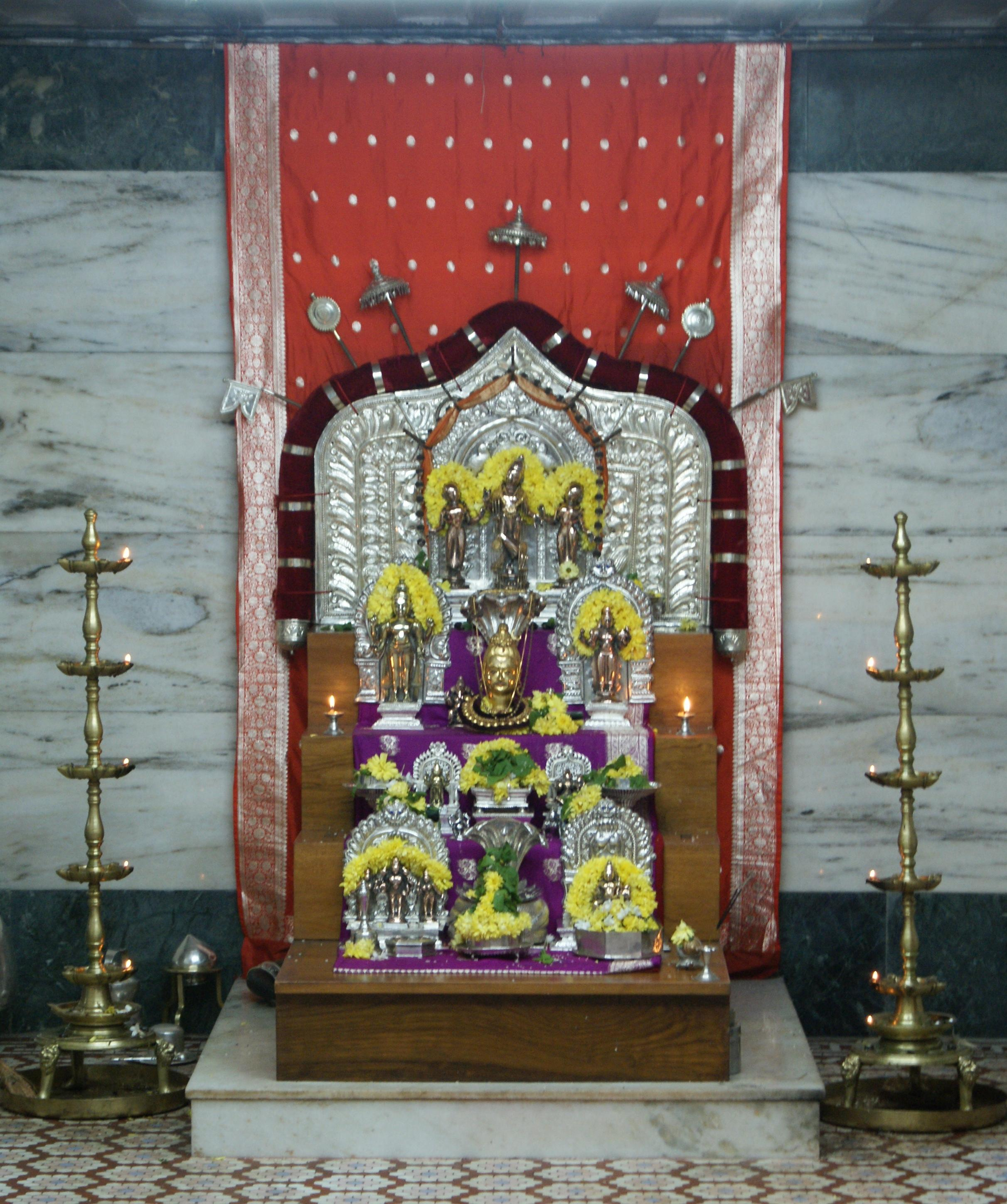
Decorated murti of Bhagvan Shri Bhavani Shankar along with Vishnu, Devi, Surya and Ganesha at Shri Saunstan Gauḍapādāchārya matha, Kavale, Goa

In Kali Yuga Sri Gaudapadcharya is the first preceptor to imbibe the Vedanta Wisdom and imparted it to his disciples, thus he is the first historical exponent of Advaita Vedanta. He is the guru of Govinda Bhagavatpadacharya (the guru of Adi Shankaracharya), thus he is the Parama Guru (Grand Guru) of Adi Shankaracharya.

Gauḍapādāchārya authored Ma-n.d.ukya Ka-rika- which is known by several names such as Gaud.apa-da Ka-rika-, Mandookya Vartika, Mandukopanishad Gaudapada Vakyan, Aagama Granth, Upadesha Granth and also by the name A-gama S'a-stra a commentary on Mandukya Upanishad. Gauḍapādāchārya describes the subtle meanings locked in the mantras of Mandukya Upanishad, one of the shortest but most profound Upanishads, or mystical Vedas, consisting of just 13 prose sentences. Although it is a small book by its length, its philosophical contents are very profound and far reaching, and it is considered one of the greatest works of fundamental philosophy by all scholars. Gaud.apa-da Ka-rika- is the earliest known systematic exposition of Advaita Vedanta. That is why this book is also known as 'Vedanta Moola' meaning the basis of Vedanta philosophy. He explained the illusionary nature (maya) of the world and the reality of the Parabhrahman.

Gaudapadcharya wrote commentary on Sāṁkhya Kārikā of Iśvarakṛṣṇa (3rd century), and his other works included Anurgeeta-bhasya, Uttargeeta-bhasya, Chidananda Kelivilas.

Adi Shankaracharya at the end of his famous commentary to the Gaud.apa-da Ka-rika- addresses the following salutation to Gauḍapādāchārya as his 'Parama Guru' (grand teacher) and compliments him for recovering Advaita Vedanta from Vedas. That verse in Sanskrit goes like this:

Prajnā-vaishākha-vaighashrubhit-Jalanidhe-vaidn-āmnontarastam |
Bhutānyālokya magnānya-virat-janan-agrahdhore samudre |
Karuna-yadudhrdh-dharamrat-amidam-marairdhurlabham bhuthetoho |
Yastam poojyābhipujyam paramaguru-mamun pādpatairnimāmi ||

In English it means: 'I prostrate before the Master of my Master (ParamaGuru), the most venerable among the venerable who, seeing the beings immersed in the ocean of this world, ocean infested by frightening sharks such as birth and death, has given, out of compassion towards all beings, this nectar difficult to drink even by the gods and that is hidden in the depths of the great sea of the Vedas, Vedas that he reveals by the power of his enlightened intellect'.

Though there is not much written details about Gaudapadcharya's past life, according to a legend Gaudapadacharya was born to Shri Vishnudatta and Gunavathi in a devout Saraswat Brahmin family at Bhupalam near Vitta in the present district of Sangli, and his name was Shukadatt. He renounced his life at a very younger age and went to the nearby hill forest in quest of spiritual wisdom. There he was instructed by God through Nabhovani (inner voice) to march towards North to fulfill his spiritual wisdom. Dattadeva received the wisdom of Vedanta through the grace of Lord Narayana and the blessings of Shri Vedavyasa at Badrikashrama.

== Shri Govinda Bhagavatpadaacharya ==
Govinda Bhagavatpadacharya (IAST Govinda Bhagavatpāda) was the Guru of the Advaita philosopher, Adi Shankara, and it is mentioned in all the traditional accounts (Shankara Vijayams. He is also mentioned in the very first verse of Shri Adi Shankaracharya's Prakaraņa grantha (treatise) Viveka Chudamani. Shri Adi Guru Gaudapadacharya was his Guru (Teacher).

Adi Guru Shri Gauḍapādāchārya was on a pilgrimage to Kashi (Varanasi) with his Sishya Shri Govinda Bhagavatpadacharya, and they stayed at a tapovan where he established an ashram inside a cave on the banks of the Narmada River. At the same time, a boy called Shankara who was in search of a Guru, learnt from people about Shri Gauḍapādāchārya as a great Yogi living in a cave on the river bank in deep meditation. Shankara soon reached the ashram and stood before the entrance of the cave singing some verses. Hearing the verses Shri Govinda Bhagavatpadacharya asks from the cave who was standing near the cave and Shankara replies in the form of 10 slokas ending with the refrain "Sivahkevaloham". These ten slokas constitute the famous Dasasloki of the Acharya. After some conversations Shankara expressed his desire to be initiated into Sanyas and Shri Govinda Bhagavatpadacharya conveyed it to his Guru Shri Gauḍapādāchārya.

Shri Gauḍapādāchārya from his power of Tapasya found out that this Shri Shankra was an incarnation of Lord Shiva and born to uplift the Vedas and thus Sanatana Dharma and instructs his Sishya Shri Govinda Bhagavatpadacharya to give deeksha to Shri Shankara and later Govinda Bhagavatpadacharya initiated Shri Shankara into Sanyasa and named him as Shri Shankara Bhagavatpadacharya. After giving deeksha, Shri Govinda Bhagavatpadacharya instructed Shri Shankarachaya to write a commentary on the Brahma Sutras and propagate the Advaita philosophy. Shri Shankarachaya stays with his Guru for some more years and mastered the Vedanta.

Shri Govinda Bhagavatpadacharya also gave deeksha to another vatu and named him Shri Vivaranananda, who returned to head Shri Gauḍapādāchārya matha at Keloshi in Goa.

== Deities ==
Bhavanishankar, an aspect of Shiva is the aradhya devata (tutelary deity) of the matha. Daily trikal (Morning, Afternoon, and Evening) Puja is offered by the Mathadipati (head monk) to Bhavanishankar along with deities Shree Rukmini, Shree Gopalkrishna and Shree Satyabhama, Shree Vishnu, Shree Ganapathi, Shree Vedavyas, Shree Gadha Padmanabha, Shree Bala Ganapati, Shree Uma Maheshwar, Shree Balakrishna, Shree Devi Bhoodevi and Shree Venkataramana, Shree Sheshanaga, Shree Kodandarama according to Smartha tradition of Panchayatana (five deity) puja system.

== Birudāvali or Title ==
Vivaranananda Swami founded the matha's tradition that the name of every Swami of the line should carry the suffix 'Ananda', honorific 'Saraswati', designation 'Swami' and the name of his grand guru Gaudapadacharya as the matha is also named after him. Similar to how a King is addressed when he enters the royal court with his Birudāvali (Title), Mathadhipatis of the matha are also addressed in Sanskrit. The Birudāvali of Shree Swami goes like this.

Shrmat-paramhans-parivrājak-āchārya-pādvākya-pramān-parāwar-parin yam-niyam-āsan-prānāyām-pratyāhar-dhyān-dhārana-samādhya-ashtānga yog-anushtān-nagarishtha-nishthān-ādi-guru-paramparā-prapt nigam-āgam-sār shruti-mārg-prakāshak sarva-tantra swatantra shrimajjmad-agni-tanuj tapah-swadhyāyā-adyārtha vinirmit shuparik mahākshetra gomant-achal gomati-tir-sannihit kushasthali-nagar mahāmuth-ādi-pratistāpana-āchārya sakal-sur-mukut-mani-neerājit divya-shri-bhavāni-shankar-pād-aravind-arādhar shreemat-atmānanda-saraswati-kar-kamal-sanjāt shreemat-poornānanda-saraswati-anugrahit shreemat-satchitānand-saraswati shree-padai ||

The name of Shree Swami and his guru and grand guru mentioned in above Birudāvali will change depending on the Swami addressed.

== Guru Parampara ==
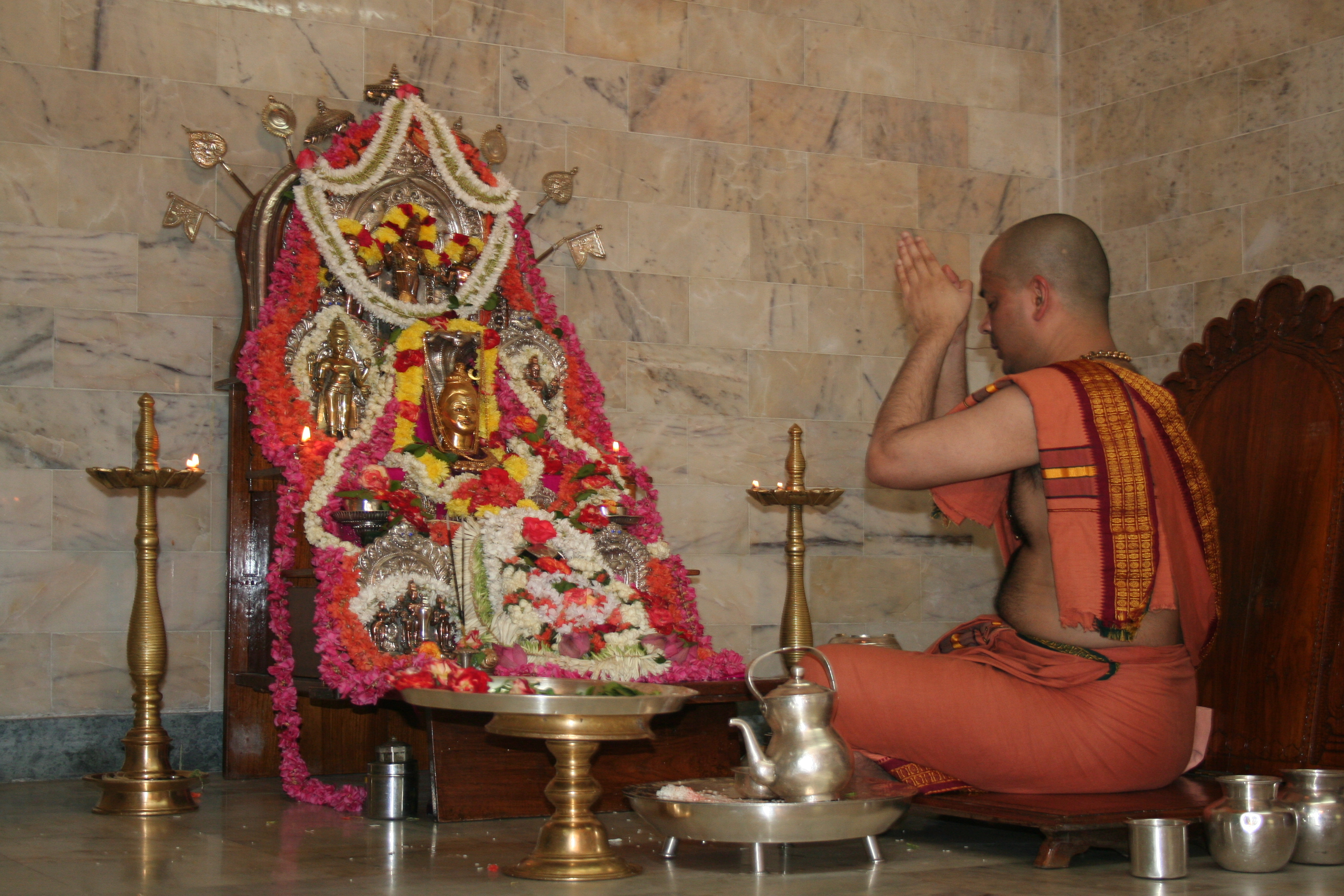
Shrimad Shivananda Saraswati Swami Gauḍapādāchārya, Present Peetadipathi of Shri Saunstan Gauḍapādāchārya matha performing daily Puja to Shri Bhavani Shankar

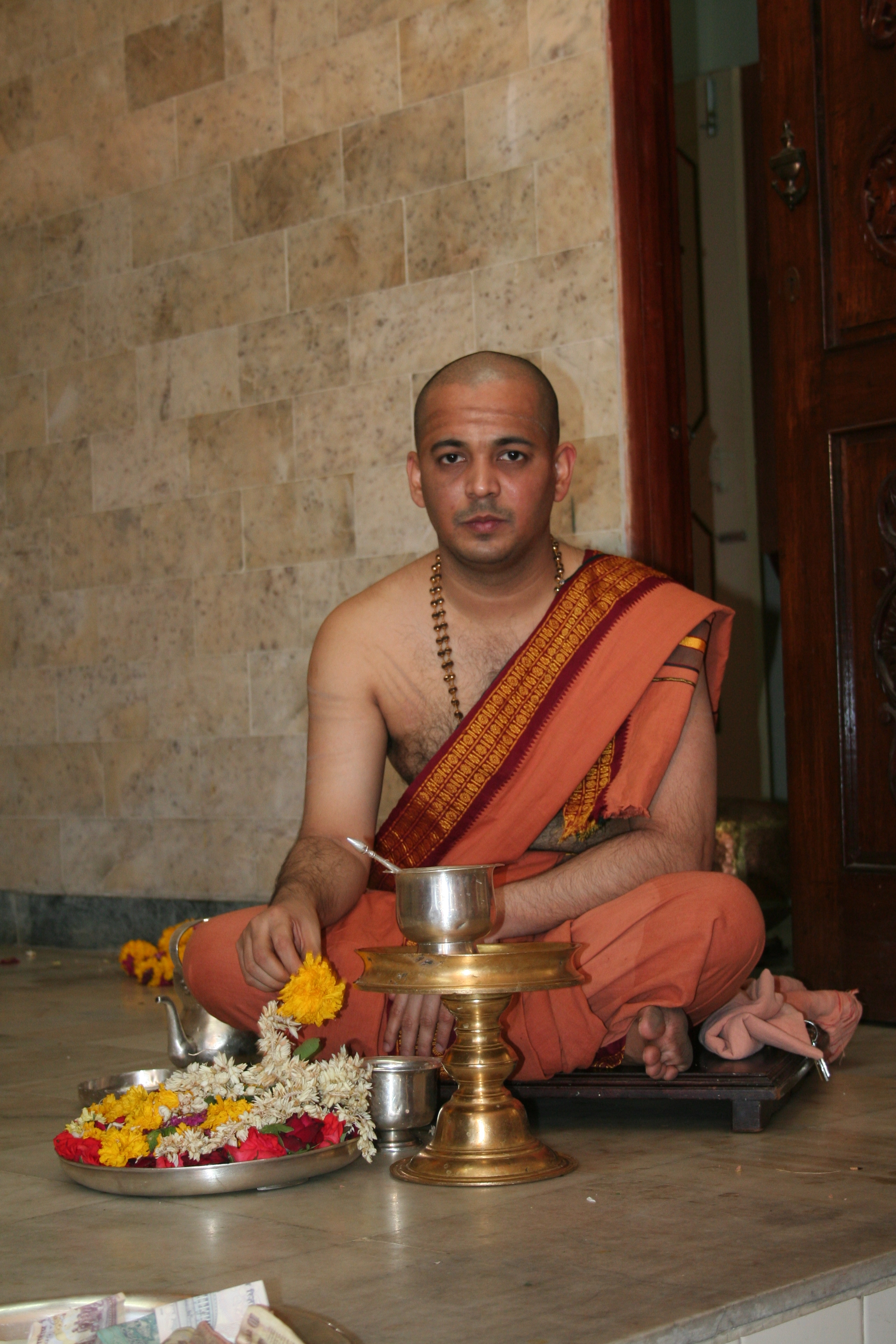
Shrimad Shivananda Saraswati Swami Gauḍapādāchārya, Present Peetadipathi of Shri Saunstan Gauḍapādāchārya matha, Kavale, Goa

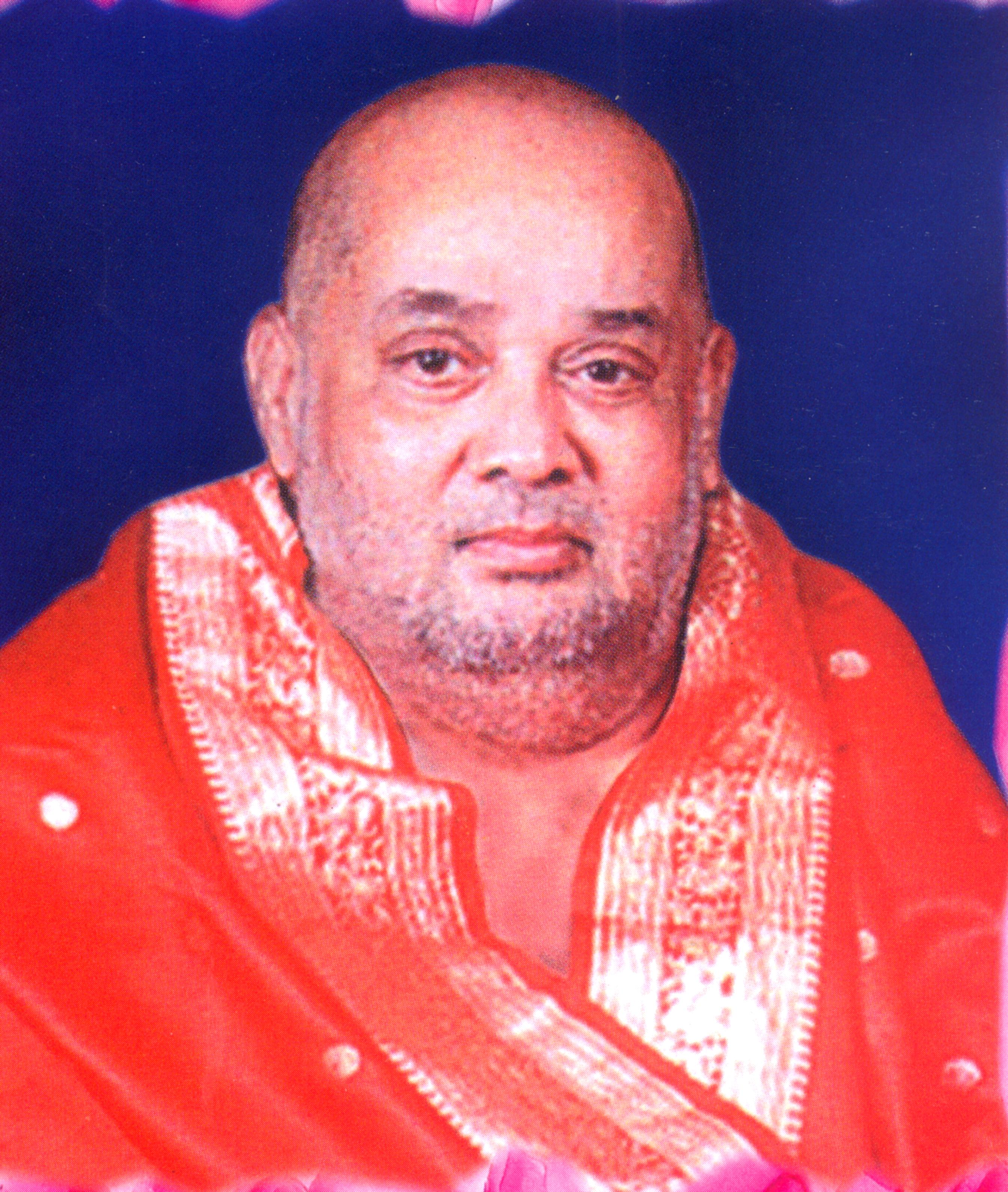
Shivaikya Shrimad Sachidananda Saraswati Swami Gauḍapādāchārya, 76th Peetadipathi of Shri Saunstan Gauḍapādāchārya matha, Kavale, Goa

The following well-known 'Parampara-stotra' among Smarthas in Sanskrit has the list of early Advaita teachers in their order and that is recited at the beginning of the study of Commentaries,

Nārāyanam Padmabhuvam Vasishtam shaktiæ ca tatputraæ Parāsharam ca |
Vyāsam Shukam Gaudapāda Mahantam Govindam Yogindram athasya shishyam |
Shri Shankarāchārya mathasya Padmapādam ca hastamalakam ca shishyam |
Tam trotakam vartika karamanyan asmad guru-nsantat-amanato ’smi ||

It means: 'To Narayana, to the lotus-born Brahma, to Vaśiṣṭha, to Shakti Maharshi and to his son Parashara, to Vyasa, to Shuka, to great Gaudapada, to Govinda-Yogindra and to his disciple Sri Shankaracarya, then to his disciples Padmapada, Hastamalaka, Totraka and Vartikakara [Suresvara], to these our Masters we pay our respectful obeisance now and forever'.

From this verse we can understand that, first teacher being Lord Narayana himself and line of descent from father to son up-to Sri Shuka Acharya. From Lord Narayana to Sri Shuka Acharya the line of succession is known as 'Vamsarsi-parampara' and from Sri Gaudapadcharya starts the descent of Sanyasins and known as 'Manava-Guru-Shishya-parampara'.

To bifurcate Acharyas according to the Yuga:

A) In Satya or Krata Yuga

1) Lord Narayana and 2) Lord Brahma.

B) In Treta Yuga

1)Vasishta Maharishi 2)Shakti Maharishi and 3) Parashara Maharishi.

C) In Dvapara Yuga

1) Veda Vyasa and 2) Sri Shuka Acharya

D) In Kali Yuga

1) Acharyas start with Sri Gaudapada Acharya.

=== Divine Group ===
- Lord Narayana
- Lord Brahma

=== Semi-Divine Group ===
==== Vamsarsi-parampara ====
- Vasishta Maharishi
- Shakti Maharishi
- Parashara Maharishi
- Veda Vyasa
- Sri Shuka Acharya

==== Manava Guru-Sampradaya ====
- Sri Gaudapada Acharya
- Sri Govinda Bhagavatpadaacharya
- Shri Adi Shankaracharya

=== Gaudapadacharyas ===
The Shri Gaudapadacharya matha follows a 'Guru-Sishya' system in which head of the Matha appoints a shishya, who succeeds the guru. A shishya is selected at very young age. The existing head of the Math decides upon a worthy disciple, initiates him as a sannyāsin, and appoints him as the head.

The available details of Guru-Shishya parampara of Shri Saunstan Gaudapadacharya matha is as given below.

- 1. Shri Gauḍapādāchārya
- 2. Shri Govinda Bhagavatpadacharya
- 3. Shrimat Vivarananda Saraswati Swami Gauḍapādāchārya & Shri Adi Shankaracharya
- 4. Shrimat Adinath Paramashivananda Saraswati Swami Gauḍapādāchārya
- 5. Shrimat Sadashiva Paramashivananda Saraswati Swami Gauḍapādāchārya
- 6. Shrimat Ishwara Paramashivananda Saraswati Swami Gauḍapādāchārya
- 7. Shrimat Rudra Pramashivananda Saraswati Swami Gauḍapādāchārya
- 8. Shrimat Vishnu Paramashivananda Saraswati Swami Gauḍapādāchārya
- 9. Shrimat Brahma Paramashivananda Saraswati Swami Gauḍapādāchārya
- 10. Shrimat Sanaka Mahashivananda Saraswati Swami Gauḍapādāchārya
- 11. Shrimat Sadananda Mahashivananda Saraswati Swami Gauḍapādāchārya
- 12. Shrimat Sanatana Mahashivananda Saraswati Swami Gauḍapādāchārya
- 13. Shrimat SanatKumara Mahashivananda Saraswati Swami Gauḍapādāchārya
- 14. Shrimat Sarika Sujata Mahashivananda Saraswati Swami Gauḍapādāchārya
- 15. Shrimat Rhibhushita Mahashivananda Saraswati Swami Gauḍapādāchārya
- 16. Shrimat Dattatreya Mahashivananda Saraswati Swami Gauḍapādāchārya
- 17. Shrimat Raivata Mahashivananda Saraswati Swami Gauḍapādāchārya
- 18. Shrimat Vamadeva Mahashivananda Saraswati Swami Gauḍapādāchārya
- 19. Shrimat Vyasa Mahashivananda Saraswati Swami Gauḍapādāchārya
- 20. Shrimat Shuka Mahashivananda Saraswati Swami Gauḍapādāchārya
- 21. Shrimat Nrisimha sadashivananda Saraswati Swami Gauḍapādāchārya
- 22. Shrimat Mahesha Sadashivananda Saraswati Swami Gauḍapādāchārya
- 23. Shrimat Bhaskara Sadashivananda Saraswati Swami Gauḍapādāchārya
- 24. Shrimat Mahendra Sadashivananda Saraswati Swami Gauḍapādāchārya
- 25. Shrimat Vishnu Sadashivananda Saraswati Swami Gauḍapādāchārya
- 26. Shrimat Madhava Sadashivananda Saraswati Swami Gauḍapādāchārya
- 27. Shrimat Mahesh Sadashivananda Saraswati Swami Gauḍapādāchārya
- 28. Shrimat Advaitha Sadashivananda Saraswati Swami Gauḍapādāchārya
- 29. Shrimat Paramatmananda Sadashivananda Saraswati Swami Gauḍapādāchārya
- 30. Shrimat Siddayogeshwarananda Sadashivananda Saraswati Swami Gauḍapādāchārya
- 31. Shrimat KAivalyananda Sadashivananda Saraswati Swami Gauḍapādāchārya
- 32. Shrimat Amritananda Sadashivananda Saraswati Swami Gauḍapādāchārya
- 33. Shrimat Hansananda Sadashivananda Saraswati Swami Gauḍapādāchārya
- 34. Shrimat Brahmananda Sadashivananda Saraswati Swami Gauḍapādāchārya
- 35. Shrimat Vimalananda Sadashivananda Saraswati Swami Gauḍapādāchārya
- 36. Shrimat Sachidananda Sadashivananda Saraswati Swami Gauḍapādāchārya
- 37. Shrimat Vimalananda Sadashivananda Saraswati Swami Gauḍapādāchārya
- 38. Shrimat Ramamnda Sadashvananda Saraswati Swami Gauḍapādāchārya
- 57. Shrimat Poornananda Saraswati Saraswati Swami Gauḍapādāchārya
- 58. Shrimat Sahajananda Saraswati Saraswati Swami Gauḍapādāchārya
- 59. Shrimat Vidyananda Saraswati Saraswati Swami Gauḍapādāchārya
- 60. Shrimat Ramananda Saraswati Saraswati Swami Gauḍapādāchārya
- 61. Shrimat Sadananda Saraswati Saraswati Swami Gauḍapādāchārya
- 62. Shrimat Bhavananda Saraswati Saraswati Swami Gauḍapādāchārya
- 63. Shrimat Sachidananda Saraswati Saraswati Swami Gauḍapādāchārya
- 64. Shrimat Shivananda Saraswati Swami Gauḍapādāchārya & Shrimat Atmananda Saraswati Swami Gauḍapādāchārya
- 65. Shrimat Ramananda Saraswati Swami Gauḍapādāchārya
- 66. Shrimat Jyotirananda Saraswati Swami Gauḍapādāchārya, Shrimat Lilananda Saraswati Swami Gauḍapādāchārya, Shrimat Sadananda Saraswati Swami Gauḍapādāchārya & Shrimat Poornanada Saraswati Swami Gauḍapādāchārya
- 67. Shrimat Ramananda Saraswati Swami Gauḍapādāchārya
- 68. Shrimat Shivananda Saraswati Swami Gauḍapādāchārya
- 69. Shrimat Atmananda Saraswati Swami Gauḍapādāchārya
- 70. Shrimat Poornananda Saraswati Swami Gauḍapādāchārya
- 71. Shrimat Ramananda Saraswati Swami Gauḍapādāchārya
- 72. Shrimat Shivananda Saraswati Swami Gauḍapādāchārya
- 73. Shrimat Atmananda Saraswati Swami Gauḍapādāchārya
- 74. Shrimat Poornananda Saraswati Swami Gauḍapādāchārya
- 75. Shrimat Ramananda Saraswati Swami Gauḍapādāchārya
- 76. Shrimat Sachidananda Saraswati Swami Gauḍapādāchārya Purvashram Name- Bhalachandra Ganpatrao Gaitonde
- 77. Shrimat Shivananda Saraswati Swami Gauḍapādāchārya [Present Pontiff] Purvashram Name- Govind Somnath Sanzgiri, son of Shri.Somnath Kashinath Sanzgiri.Hailing from Kumbharjuve Goa but were staying in Mumbai.Appointed as successor by predecessor Swamiji in 1994.A Grand Shishya Sweekar Ceremony was organised. Present Pontiff ascended to the Peeth in 2004 and became Mathadhipati after Guru Swami took Mahasamadhi.
- There are no records available about the swamiji's from serial number 39 to 56. The records were destroyed by the Portuguese government during their rule in Goa.

== Branches (Ashrams) ==
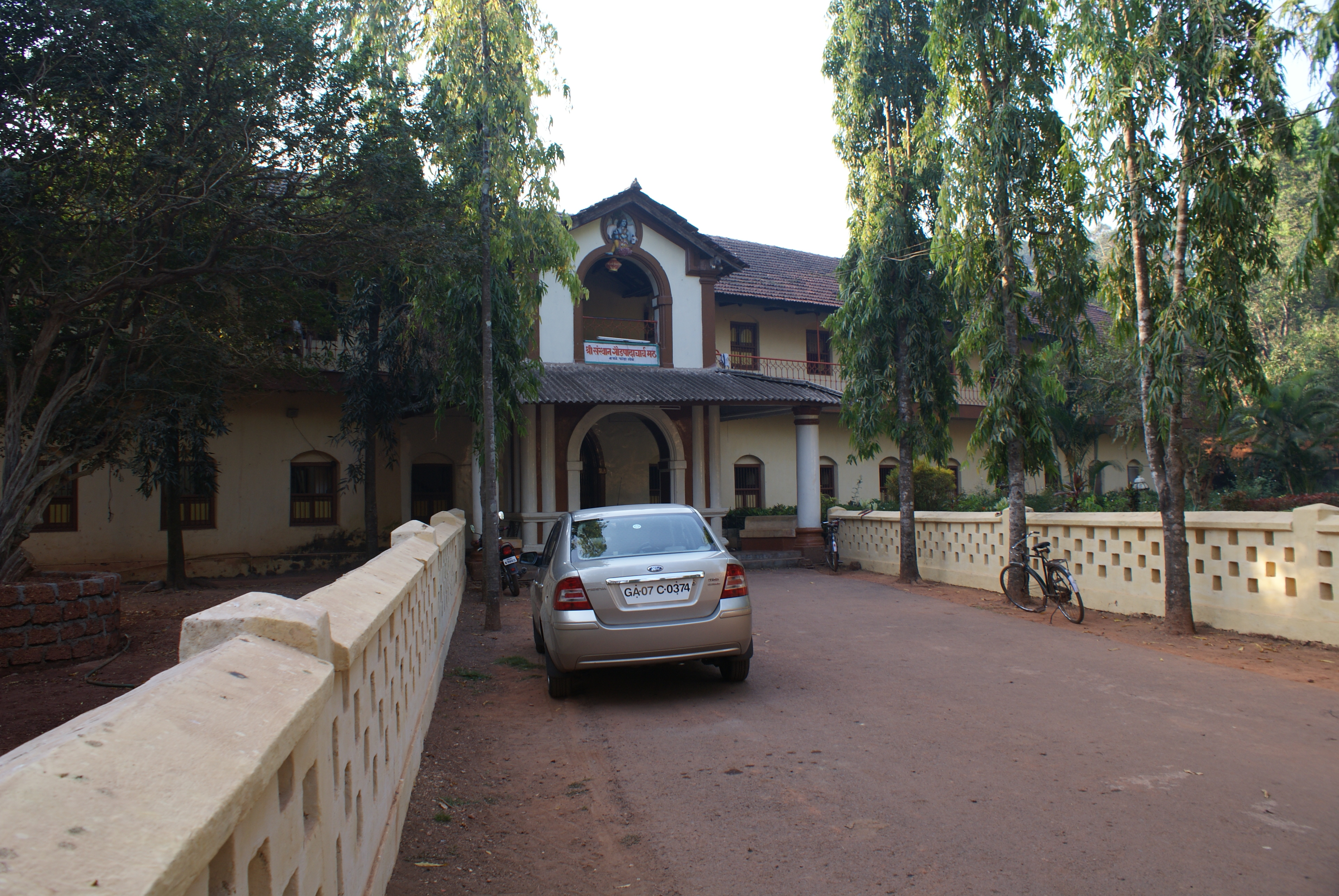
Headquarters of Shri Gauḍapādāchārya matha Building at Kavale, Ponda, Goa.

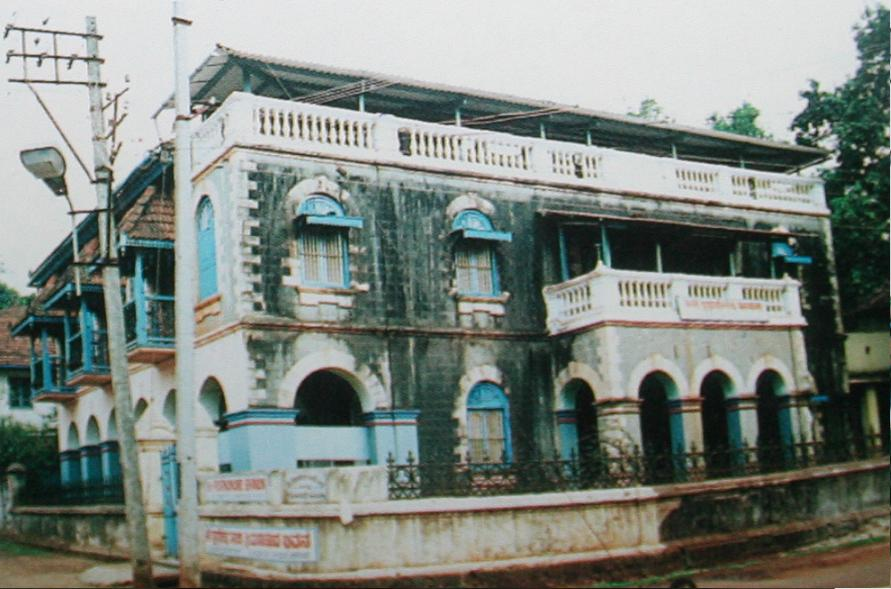
Headquarters of Shri Gauḍapādāchārya matha Building at Belgaum, Karnataka.

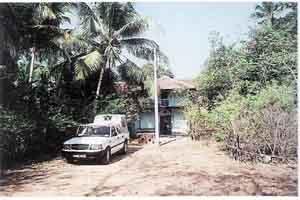
Shri Gauḍapādāchārya matha branch at Chinchewada, Sadashivgad, Maharashtra.

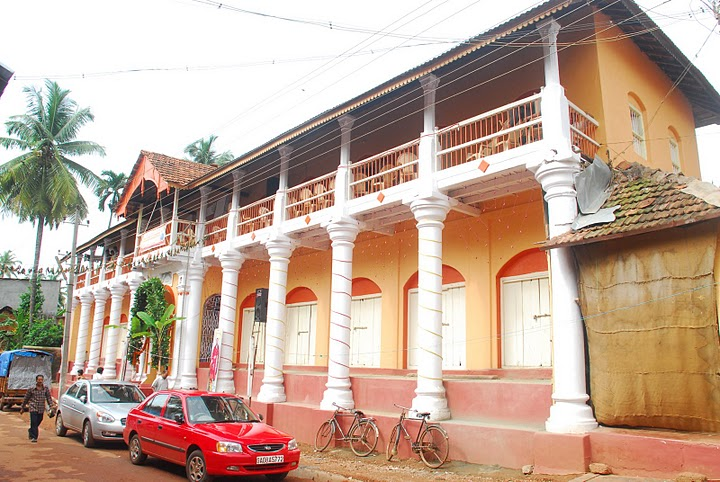
Shri Gauḍapādāchārya matha branch at Gokarna, Karnataka.

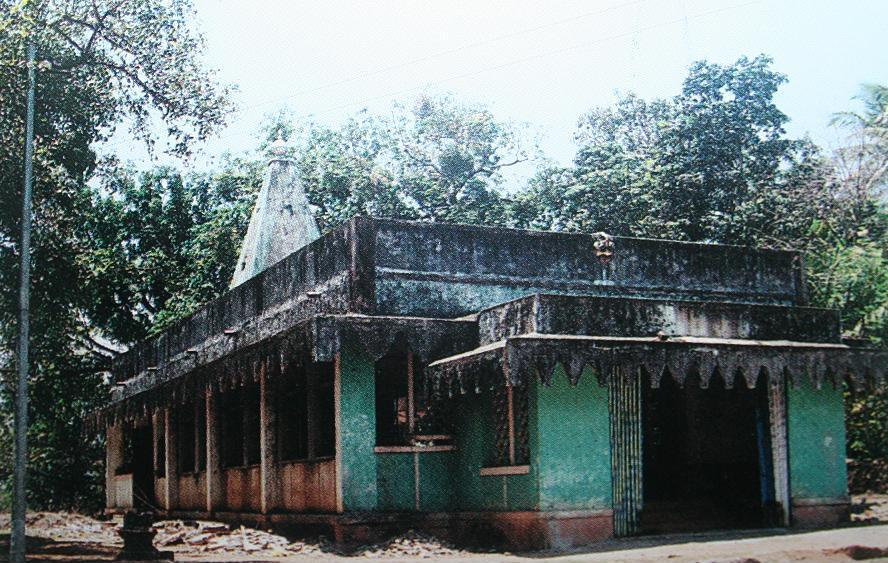
Shri Gauḍapādāchārya matha branch at Ankola, Karnataka.

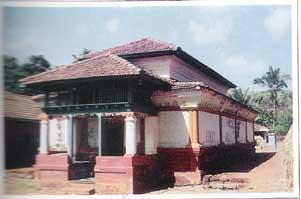
Shri Gauḍapādāchārya matha branch at Halage, Karvar, Karnataka.

The Kavale matha has following branches/Ashramas.

- 1. Shri Sanstan Gauḍapādāchārya matha, (Headquarters), Kavale, Ponda, Goa, Pin- 403 401. This Moola matha (headquarters) was built and inaugurated by 63rd pontiff Shri Sachidananda Saraswati Swamiji. This matha is in close vicinity of Shri Shantadurga temple and there are six Samadhis within the premise. This matha was built about seventy years after the original matha at Keloshi was destroyed by Portuguese. Land for this matha was donated by King Basavalinga Soundha of Sonde Kingdom who ruled at the time.
- 2. Kashi matha: K22/58, Durga ghat, Varanasi ([Kashi]), U.P., Pin - 221 008. This matha situated on Durgaghat in Kashi and the presiding deity of the matha is Lord Yaduraj.
- 3. Near Dhruvakila, Brahmavarta, Kanpur, U.P.. Brahmavarta is ancient well known holy place. The matha is in the fort at Dhrub Ghat on the banks of River Ganga. Near to this place stands magnificent palace of King Uttanapada. This matha has a Shri Rama Temple. The matha used to get an annual grant of thousand rupees from the former Indore state.
- 4. Nasik, Maharashtra, Pin - 422 011. This matha is located on the banks of the river Godavari in Nasik and close to the Sarkarwada of Shrimant Peshwa, has two Samadhi's in it. The land for this matha was gifted by a Patil during Peshwas rule. In 1657, then ruler Chatrapati Sahu Maharaj made a permanent grant to this matha, later Gaekwad of Baroda also made a cash grant of Rs 1525/- a year. Once during 74th Shrimat Poornananda Saraswati Gauḍapādāchārya's stay in the matha, it caught fire and his disciple Vishnu Vinayak Gaitonde saved the life of Shri swamiji by putting his own life in to great risk. In this tragedy several valuable records including grant deeds were destroyed.
- 5. 91, Banaganga Tank Road, Malabar Hill, Walkeshwar, Mumbai, Pin - 400 006. This matha is on Malabar hill, in Mumbai along the shores of Arabian sea. There is famous Banganga lake in front of this matha. The Kashi matha building and the well-known Shree Walkeshawar temple is also in the close vicinity of this matha. There are three samadhis in this matha. Shri Ramshenvi Lotlikar of Vatsa Gotra had donated the land for this matha. This matha was last rebuilt by 76th Shrimat Sachidananda Saraswati Swami Gauḍapādāchārya. For rebuilding the matha, cornerstone was laid by Shri Kashi Mathadish, Shimat Sudhindra Teertha Swamiji on 28 February 1963 in the devine presence of Shrimat Dwarakanath Teertha Swami Wadiyar of Shri Gokarna matha. This was the first and rare occasion where swainji's of three Saraswat matha's came together. Later the rebuilt matha was ceremonially inaugurated by Shimat Sudhindra Teertha Swamiji of Kashi matha on 28 May 1967.
- 6. matha Gali, Khanapur, Belgaum, Karnataka, Pin - 591 302. This matha is situated on the banks of Malprabha river in Khanapur village in Belgaon District of Karnataka and it houses three samadhis. This matha was built during Shree Ramananda Saraswati in about 1758 AD. In this matha Panchmuhki idol of Shree Mangesh Shankar (Uma-Maheshwar) is worshiped. The Peshwas donated the township of Marisapur for upkeep of the matha. During the riots of Kittur that swept the area, matha was looted and Gold and Silver were lost worth lakhs of Rupees along with records of grants given to matha.
- 7. Vithalapur, Sankhali, Goa, Pin- 403 505. This matha is about 17 miles away from matha at Kavale. This matha houses the Samaadhi of Shree Brahmananda Saraswati and Shree Poornananda Saraswati, the 66th Swamiji in this matha. Shri Satroji Rane had built this matha in Saka 1722.
- 8. Sonvade, Kudal, Taluk Sindhudurg, Maharashtra, Pin - 416 520. This matha is situated in Sonavade village of Kudal in Sawantwadi. There are three samadhis in this matha including that of 63rd Guru Shree Satchidananda Saraswati. Prince of Wadi Bhonsale donated the land for this matha along with agricultural land for maintenance of the matha.
- 9. Chinder, Malvan Taluk, Sindhudurg Dist, Maharashtra, Pin - 416 602. This matha was established and inaugurated by Shree Poornananda Saraswati, the 66th Swamiji. Shree Ramanand Saraswati, disciple of Shri Vidyananda Saraswati lived here.
- 10. Golvan, Golvan Taluk, Sindhudurg Dt., Maharashtra. This matha is in Golvan village, Golvan taluka, Maharashtra. There are three samadhis in this matha, of those Shri Poornananda Saraswati, Shri Sahajananda Saraswati and Shri Vidyananda Saraswati.
- 11. Chinchewada, Sadashivgad, Karwar, North Karnataka, Pin - 581 352. This matha was built during then Mathadish Shree Shivanand Swamiji in Saka 1793, about 3 km from Karvar, north Karnataka. The main deity Shree Sharadamba devi is worshipped in this matha along with Shiva Linga of black stone marked with concentric circles. When Rudrabhisheka is done to this Shiva Linga, one can hear the booming sound of 'Aum'. This matha also houses samadhi of Shree Shivanand Saraswati swamiji the 73rd swaimiji.
- 12. Halage, Dhol, Karwar District, North Karnataka, Pin - 581 328. In this matha idol of Shree Vithal Vishveshwar is installed and worshipped. Land for this matha was donated by Ramachandra Marthoba Nadkarni Malapurkar and his brothers ob 16 February 1890. This is the birthplace of Shree Atmananda Saraswati Swamiji, the seventy fourth Swamiji.
- 13. Main Road, Shree Kshetra Gokarna, North Canara, Karnataka Pin - 581 326. This matha was constructed in between Saka 1830–1841 and the marble idol of Shri Chakravarti Shivalinga was installed in it on Phlalguna Shukla Dashami (29 February 1920). The land for the matha was donated by Annapurnabai Shabaji Kulkarni of Chendiye, Karvar Taluk to Shri Atmananda Saraswati in Saka 1753.
- 14. 45, Somavar Pet, Tilakwad, Belgaum, Karnataka, Pin - 590 006.
- 15. Lakshmeshwar, Ankola, North Canara, Karnataka, Pin - 581 314.

== Branch mathas having Temples within their Precincts ==
The following branches of Shri Gauḍapādāchārya Matha have temple within their precincts.

1. Shrē Vithal Rakhumai temple at Kavale Matha.
2. Shrē Uma Maheshwar temple at Khanapur Matha.
3. Shrē Mahakali and Muralidhar Gopalakrishna temple at Walkeshwar Matha, Mumbai.
4. Shrē Bhavanishankar temple Sonavade Matha, Sindhudurg.
5. Shrē Sita Ramachandra temple at Brahmavart Matha, U.P.
6. Shrē Bhavanishankar temple at Chindar Matha, Kankavali.
7. Shrē Venu Gopal at Kashi matha, Varanasi, U.P.
8. Shrē Vithal Vishveshwar temple at Halage Matha, Sadashivgad.
9. Shrē Sharadamba temple at Sadashivgad matha.
10. Shrē Chakravarti Shivaling at Gokarna Matha, North Canara, Karnataka.
11. Shrē Shree Datta Mandir at Ankola Matha.

== Other Saraswath mathas ==
- Kashi Math (Varanasi, Uttar Pradesh)
- Chitrapur Math (Shirali, Karnataka)
- Gokarna Math (Partagali, Goa)

== See also ==
- Mandukya Upanishad
