= Villages and agraharas in Goa and their ancient names =

Old names of villages in Goa, India

This article contains a list of Ancient names of a few Goan villages and Agraharas.

== List ==
Ancient name	Modern name
Asgav/Asgaon	Assagao
Varenya/Varunapur	Verna
Lattala	Lotli/Loutolim
Mathagrama	Margao/Madgao
Kushasthali	Kutthali/Cortalim
Ananta uruga( corrupted as Anantaurja)	Antaruj ( also called as Ponda )
Kudtarika	Kudtari/Curtorim
Naagvhay	Nagave/Nagoa
Banavalli/Banahalli	Banavli/Benaulim
Survalli/Surahalli	Suravali/Seraulim
Banastari	Banastari
Harhara	Harmala/Arambol
Ray Grama	Ray/Raia
Kardalipura/Kardalivana	Keloshi/Quelossim
Bhatagrama/Skrinkhala	Sakhali/Sanquelim
Chudamani	Chodan/Chorão
Deepavati	Diwadi//Divar
Mahashala	Mashel/Marcela
Pahajani kali	Panaji/Panjim
Badari	Bori/Borim
Sangampura/Sangam	Sange/Sanguem
Rishivana	Rhivana/Rivona
Jambuvali/Jambuhalli	Jambavali/Zambaulim
Shakhavali/Shankhahalli	Sankhval/Sancoale
Naghalli	Nagali
Kumkumahalli	Kunkalli/Cuncolim
Kanvapura	Kanacona/Canacona
Paingyapura	Paingin/Poinguinim
Parashu	Parse/Parsem
Kelambi	Kolva/Colva
Shalagrama	Salgao/Saligao
Bandivatak	Bandode/Bandora
Kasarpallika	Kasarpali/Kansarpal
Agastipura	Agapur
Kushvan	Kusman/Cusmona
Kharegrama	Khandepar
Dipakavishaya	Divachal (Konkani), Dicholi (Marathi), Bicholim (English, Portuguese)
Kundivataka	Kudne

|Vellimpura (Velim) |Chandrapura (Chandor)

== See also ==
- Agrahara
