= Shantadurga =

Form of the Hindu goddess Durga

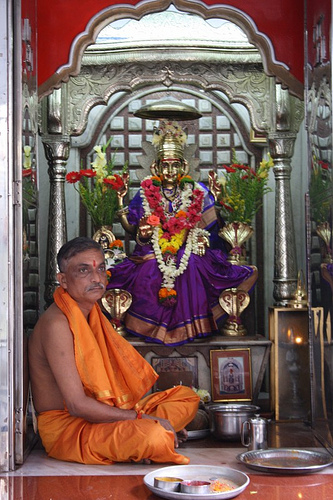
- Shantadurga in the Shitaladevi temple complex in Mumbai
- Other names: Lalita, Rudrani Narayani, Maheshi Sharvani Bhawani Mrudani Saraswati
- Sanskrit transliteration: Śāntādurgā
- Affiliation: Parvati Amba Sati Adishakti Santeri Durga
- Abode: Keloshi Kavlem Shanta Durga Temple
- Mount: Lion
- Temple: Shree Shantadurga Temple Kavlem
- Festivals: Sharad Navratri, Vasant Panchami, Margashirsh Shuddha Panchami, Lalita Panchami, Magh Shuddha Panchami, Jatraustav
- Consort: Shiva

Shantadurga (Śāntādurgā) is the most popular form of the Hindu goddess Durga revered in Goa, India, as well some parts of Karnataka. She is a form of the ancient Mother goddess known as Santeri. She is worshipped in almost all villages of Goa & Sindhudurg district of Maharashtra as an ant hill. This is seen in some temples dedicated to Shantadurga.

== Origins ==
The second chapter of the Sanskrit Nāgavya Mahātmya, Śāntādurgā prādurbhāvaḥ, is a part of Sahyādrikhaṇḍa which is the chapter of Skanda Purana gives detail about this. Only the title of the chapter mentions the goddess Shantadurga and no where else is this epithet of the goddess mentioned. This section refers to a certain sage Śāntāmuni, a resident of Nagavya (modern Nagoa). The goddess appeared before Shantamuni and hence she's known as Shantadurga. Durga is portrayed in her ferocious nature in many of the places, yet the adjective Shanta (peaceful) is found in almost all Namavalis of Durga.In verses 16,19,34 of Sahyadrikhanda, the goddess is called Śāntādevi (Shanta-devi). The verse 18 of this section mentions about the disappearance of the goddess into an ant hill. These ant hills symbolically represent goddess Shantadurga as well as goddess Santeri.

According to another lore, once there was a terrible war between the gods Shiva and Vishnu due to which the entire world was distressed. Hence the god Brahma prayed and implored Shakti (the Divine Mother) to intervene and stop the war. The Goddess held Shiva by one hand and Vishnu by the other hand and brought about reconciliation among them. This stopped the war and brought peace to the world. Such an idol of goddess is found in the inner sanctum of Shanta Durga Temple of Kavale. The 17th-century Marathi Koṅkaṇa Mahātmya furnishes an exhaustive account of the conflict between the followers of the Vaisnavism (sect of Vishnu worshippers) and Shaivism (Shiva followers) in Goa. It is quite possible that, this lore of Shantadurga symbolically represents these sectarian conflicts.

== Iconography ==
Though in few shrines dedicated to Shantadurga, an ant hill is found inside the sanctum in place a stone, metal image of the deity or a Kalasha is consecrated. Especially in Kavale temple metal image of the deity which is four handed, is depicted holding two male figures (Vishnu and Shiva) in her lower hands and snakes in the upper hands. Most of the Shantadurga temples have stone sculpture of Mahishasuramardini aspect of Shakti. Whereas some have stone or metal idol with four hands, sometimes seen holding any of the following: sword (Khaḍga), bowl of ambrosia (Pānapātra), a shield (Kheṭaka), trident(Triśūla), hand kettle drum (Ḍamaru), lotus (Padma), and snakes (Nāga). The deity is also portrayed with her hands in Abhaya Mudrā and varada. In rare cases a Kalasha is worshiped as a symbol of the deity (especially in Shantadurga Kumbharjuvekarin temple at Marcela, Goa). Few temples also worship ant hill alongside an image.

== Temples in Goa ==
- Shri Shantadurga Temple at Kandoli(Candolim) Goa.
- Shri Shantadurga Temple at Kavale
- Shantadurga Kunkalikarin at Fatorpa
- Shantadurga Fatarpekarin at Fatorpa
- Shri Shantadurga Khandparkarin at Khandepar
- Shantadurga Chamundeshwari Kudtari Mahamaya at Avedem, Quepem
- Shantadurna Kunkaliekarin at Kunkolie Ponda
- Shatadurga Kumbharjuvekarin at Marcela, Ponda
- Shantadurga Verlekarin at Marcela Ponda
- Shantadurga Talaulikarin at Marcela
- Shantadurga Mhapsekarin at Dhargal
- Shantadurga Sangodkarin at Sangolda
- Shantadurga at Veroda
- Shantadurga Shankhavaleshvari at Veling, Gothan
- Shantadurga Ballikarin at Balli
- Shantadurga Kalangutkarin Temple, Nanora, near Asnora
- Shantadurga Pilarnkarin Devasthan Narve Bicholim
- Shri Shantadurga Temp

le at Gaonkar Wada, Bicholim

- Shree Sateri Shantadurga Devasthan, Khandola Goa
- Shri Shantadurga Devasthan Vaghurme, Vaghurme-Vere, Ponda-Goa
- Shantadurga Temple at Mhapan, Vengurla<ref
