= Quelossim =

- Village
- Location in Goa, India Quelossim (India)
- Coordinates: 15°24′N 73°56′E
- Country: India
- State: Goa
- District: South Goa

Languages
  - Official: Konkani
- Time zone: UTC+5:30 (IST)
- Vehicle registration: GA
- Website: goa.gov.in

Quelossim is a village in Mormugao taluka, South Goa, India. The village was known as Kardalipura in ancient times and had a temple dedicated to the Hindu mother-goddess Shantadurga which was shifted to Kavale 450 years ago when the Portuguese demolished the shrine as a part of the inquisition. The original temple was destroyed during the religious persecution period circa 1566. A small shrine is under a large banyan tree, and the area is protected by the Directorate of Archives and Archaeology, Government of Goa.

The Konkani poet Krishnadas Shama hailed from this village. Quelossim was also known as Kelshi and Keloshi, with the villagers being called Keloshikars.
