= Deep Jyoti Stambha =

Architectural structure, usually found in Hindu temples, in the form of a column

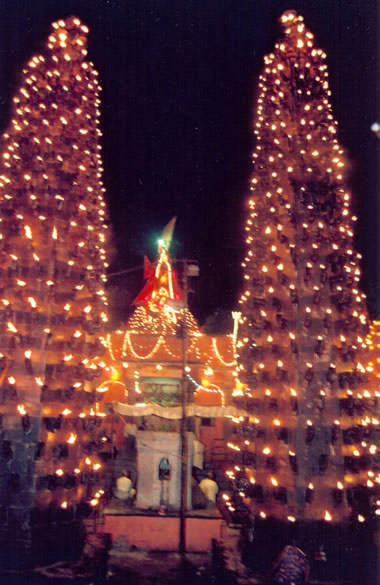
Deep Jyoti Stambh illuminated with "Diays", Harisddhi Temple of Ujjain.

Deep Jyoti Stambh or Deepa Stambha (Sanskrit: दीपस्तंभ, romanized: dīpastambha) is a unique piece of Hindu architectural structure, usually found in Hindu temples. As the name indicates, Deep means "diya" ("oil lamp"), Jyoti means "light," and stambha means "a column." Such stambhas are erected outside the temple compound, to be illuminated with diyas on special occasions. Some large and unique deepa stambhas in India can be seen at the Mahalsa Temple in Ponda in Goa, Shanta Durga Temple in Goa, Harsidhhi Temple at Ujjain, Tekari Temple at Dewas, Khandoba Temple at Jejuri, Mangueshi Temple at Mangeshi, Sri Yellamma Renuka temple of Saundatti, Sharana Basaveshwara Temple of Gulbarga, and Banashankari Amma Temple near Badami in Karnataka — one of the most historically significant and tallest can be found in the village of Aundh (Maharashtra).

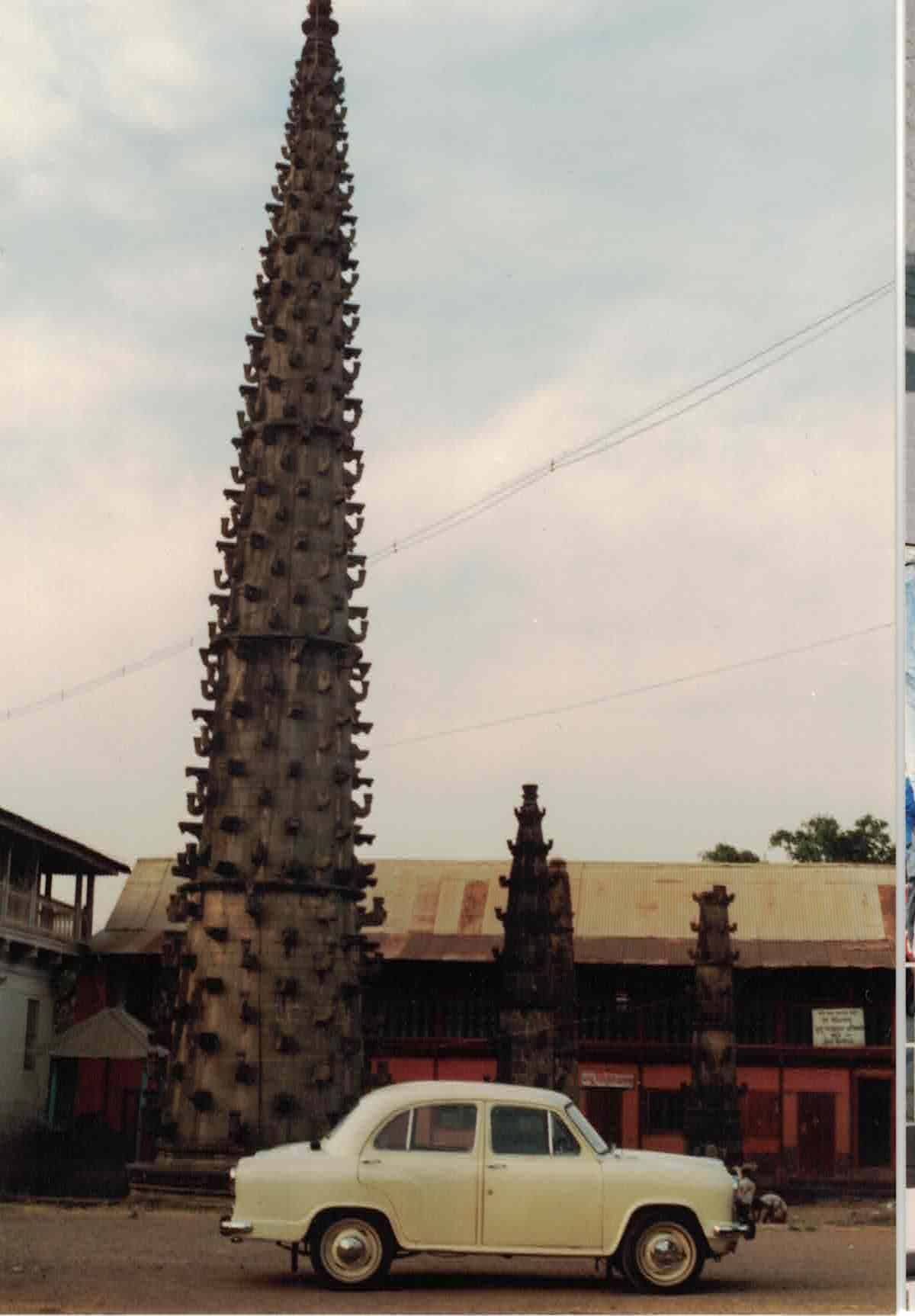
The Pride of Aundh: Standing 71 feet tall, this is not just the highest Deep Jyoti Stambh/Deepmala/Deepstambha/ in Maharashtra, but the tallest in all of India.

== The Grand Deep Jyoti Stambh/Deepmala/Deepstambha of Aundh ==
Standing tall in front of the Shri Yamai Devi Temple, this Deepstambha (Stone Lamp Tower) reaches a staggering height of approximately 71 feet, making it not just the tallest in Maharashtra but the tallest in all of India.

Its historical significance is deeply rooted in the era of Chhatrapati Shivaji Maharaj and the Maratha Empire. During the 17th century, the Adilshahi forces led by Afzal Khan marched toward Aundh via the Karad-Rahimatpur route after desecrating the holy sites of Tuljapur and Pandharpur. According to records in the Bombay Gazette, Afzal Khan—notorious for razing Hindu structures—was so awestruck by the sheer beauty and architectural grandeur of this specific Deepstambha that he did not dare to damage it.

To protect the idol of Yamai Devi during this invasion, the priests disguised the shrine as a mosque, leading to a unique tradition where a branch of the priests is still known as 'Fakir' Pujaris. Today, this 71-foot monument remains a living testament to the resilience of Indian heritage.

== Gallery ==
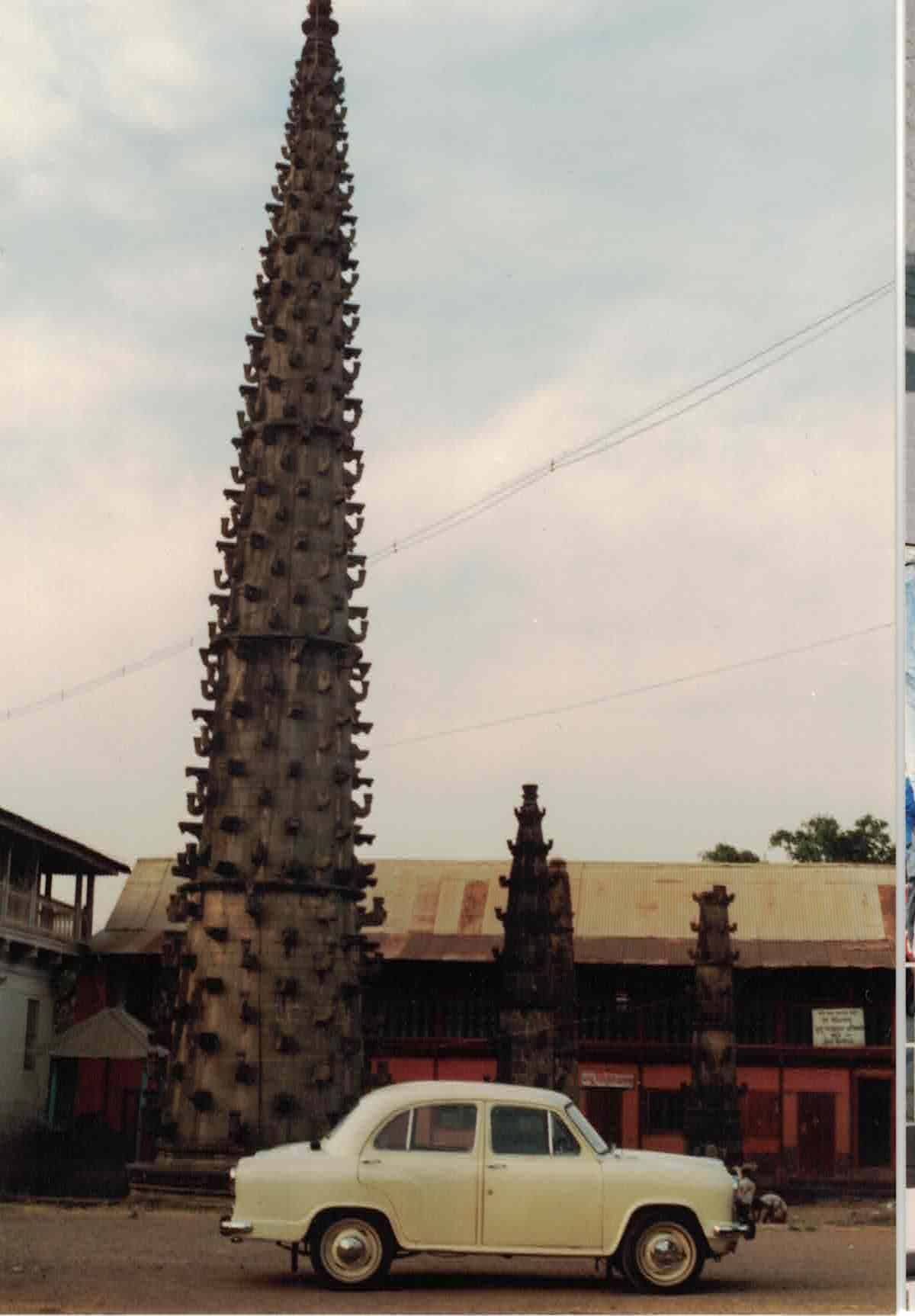
At Shree Yamai Devi Temple, Aundh (Satara)

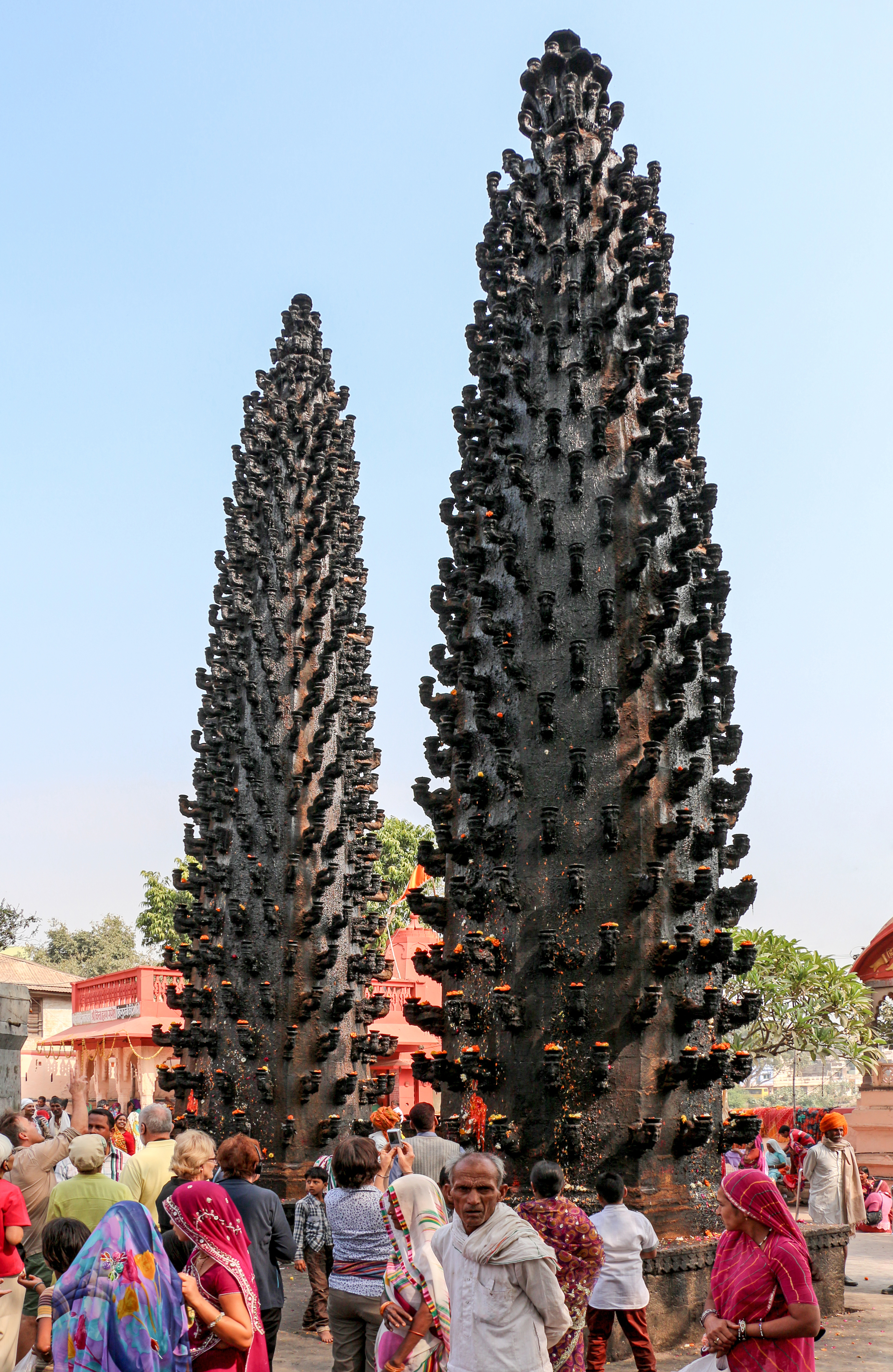
At Harsidhhi Temple in Ujjain

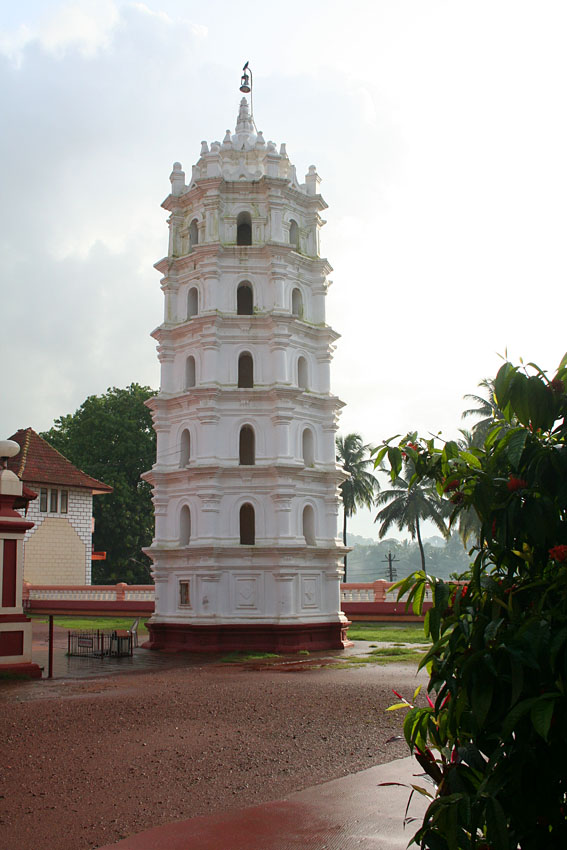
At Shanta Durga Temple in Goa

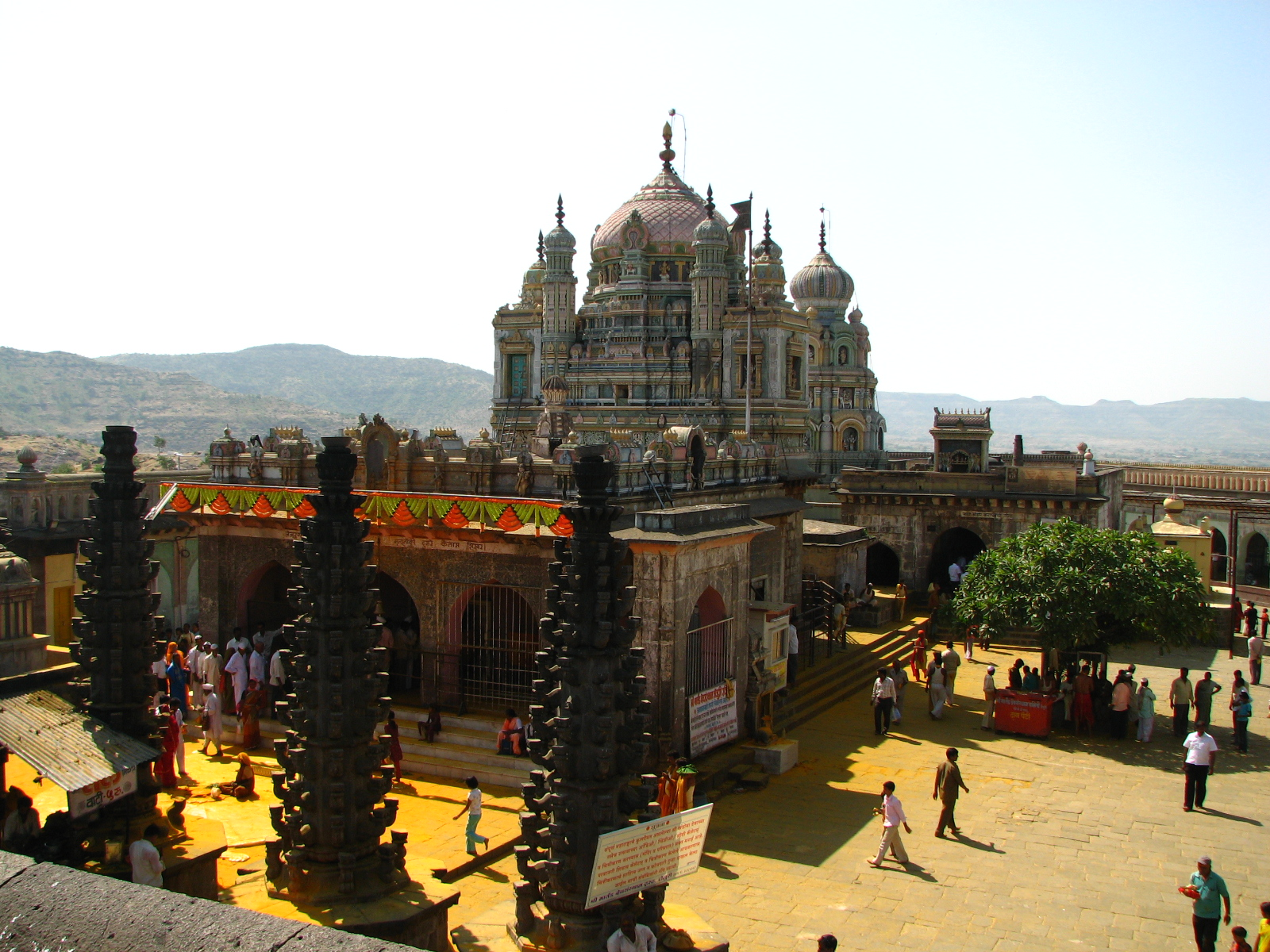
Outside the main Khandoba Temple in Jejuri

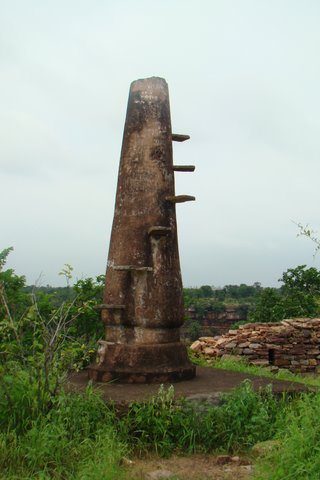
At Hinglajgarh

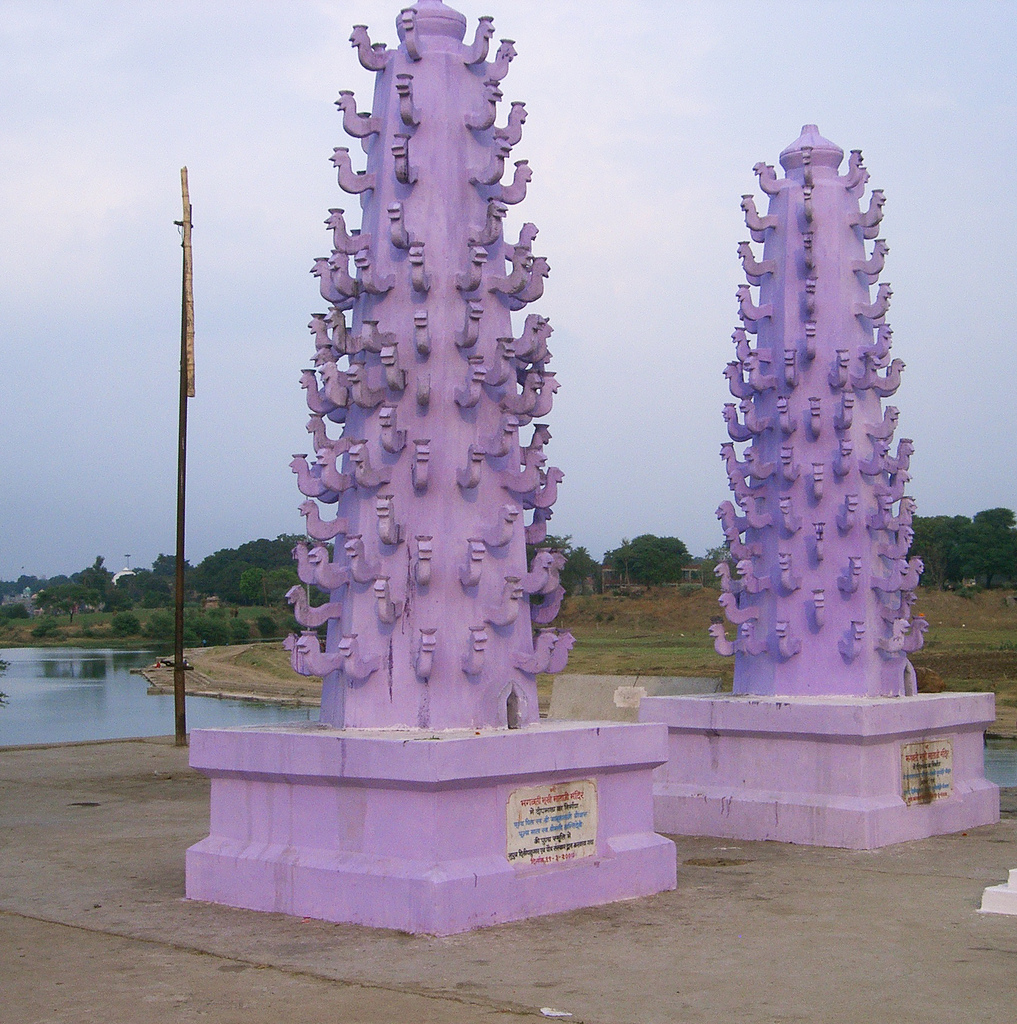
At Bhoonki Mata Temple Ujjain

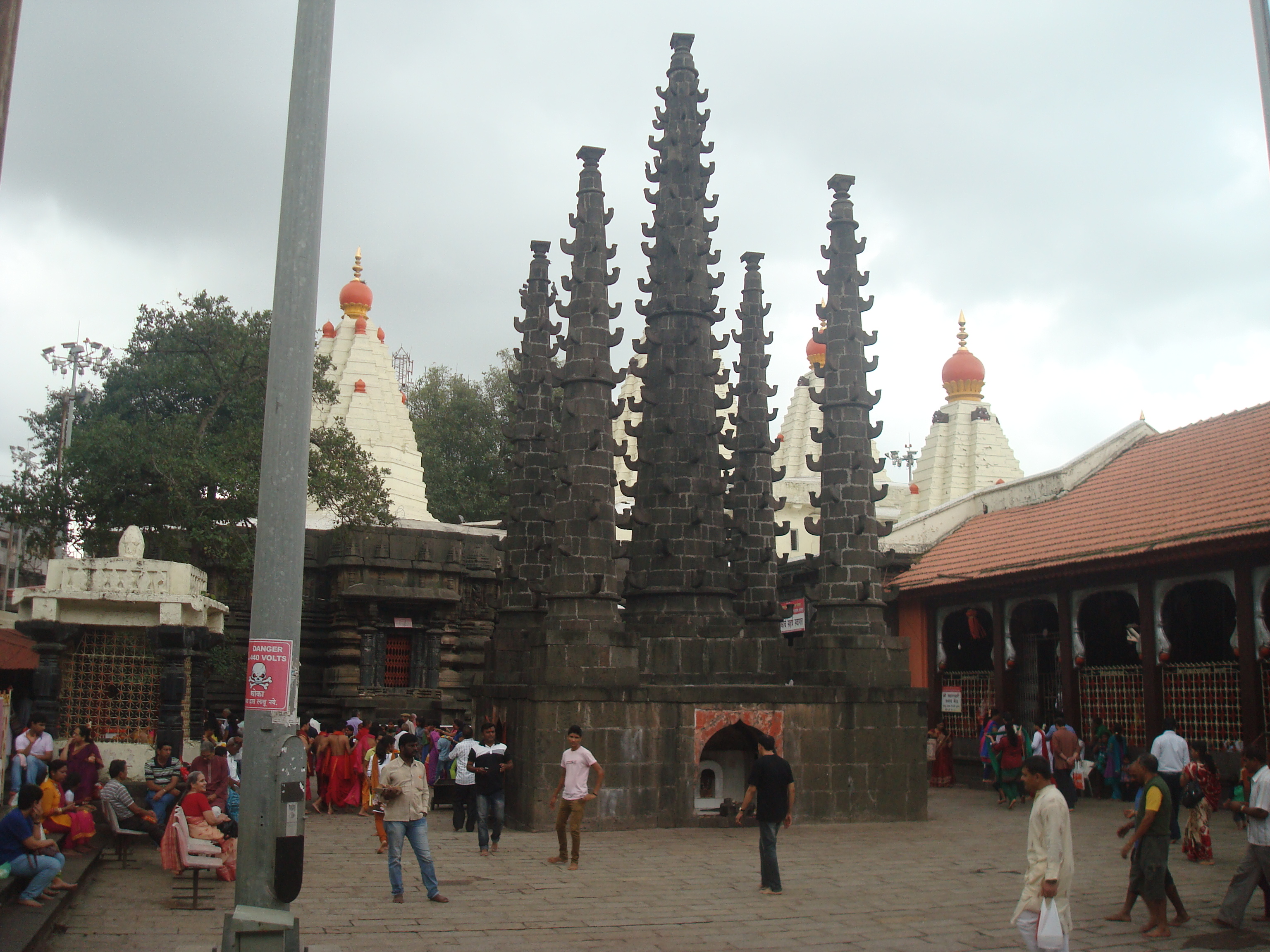
At entrance of Mahalaxmi Temple. Kolhapur

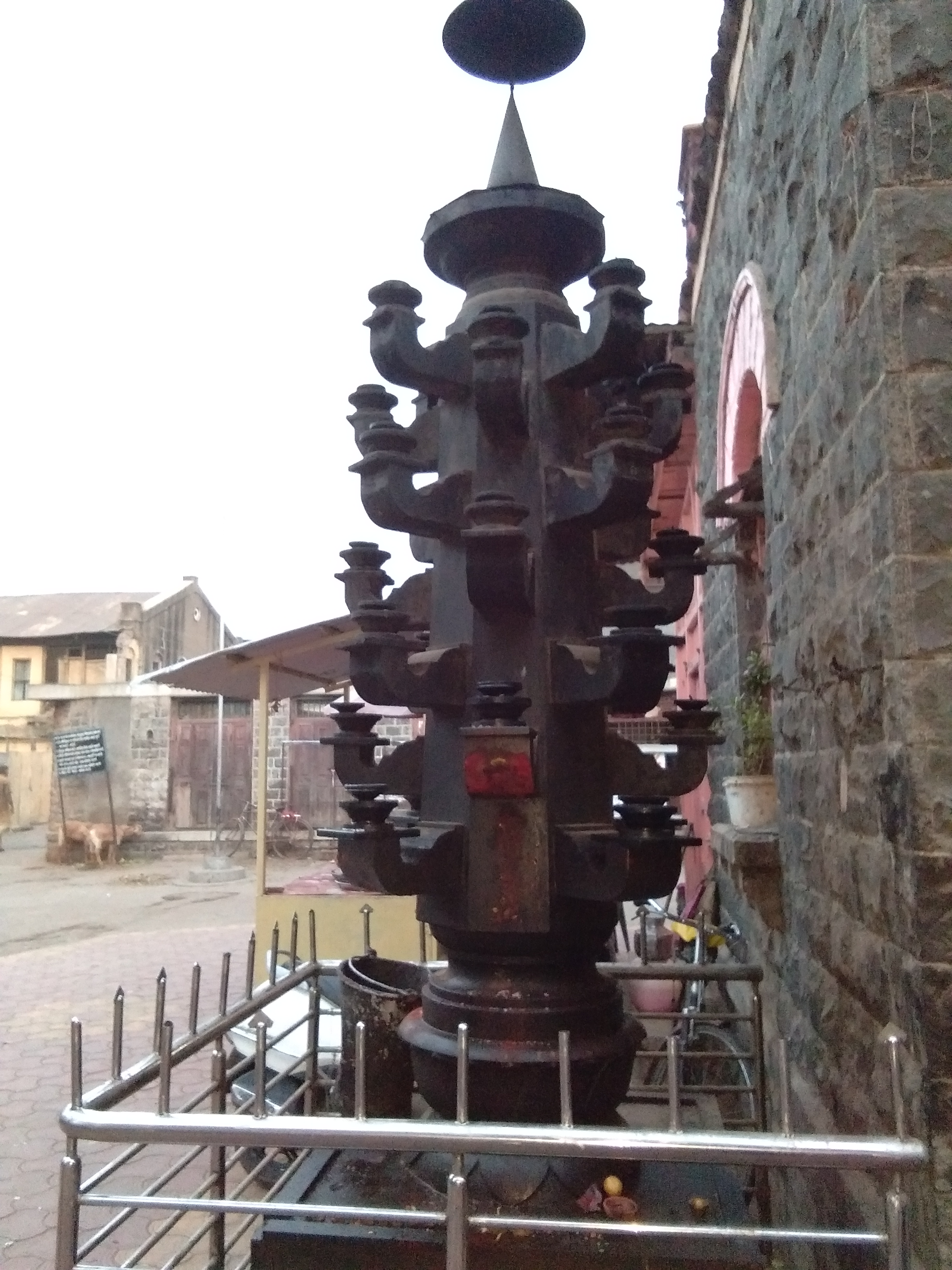
at Hingul Ambika Temple, Sholapur

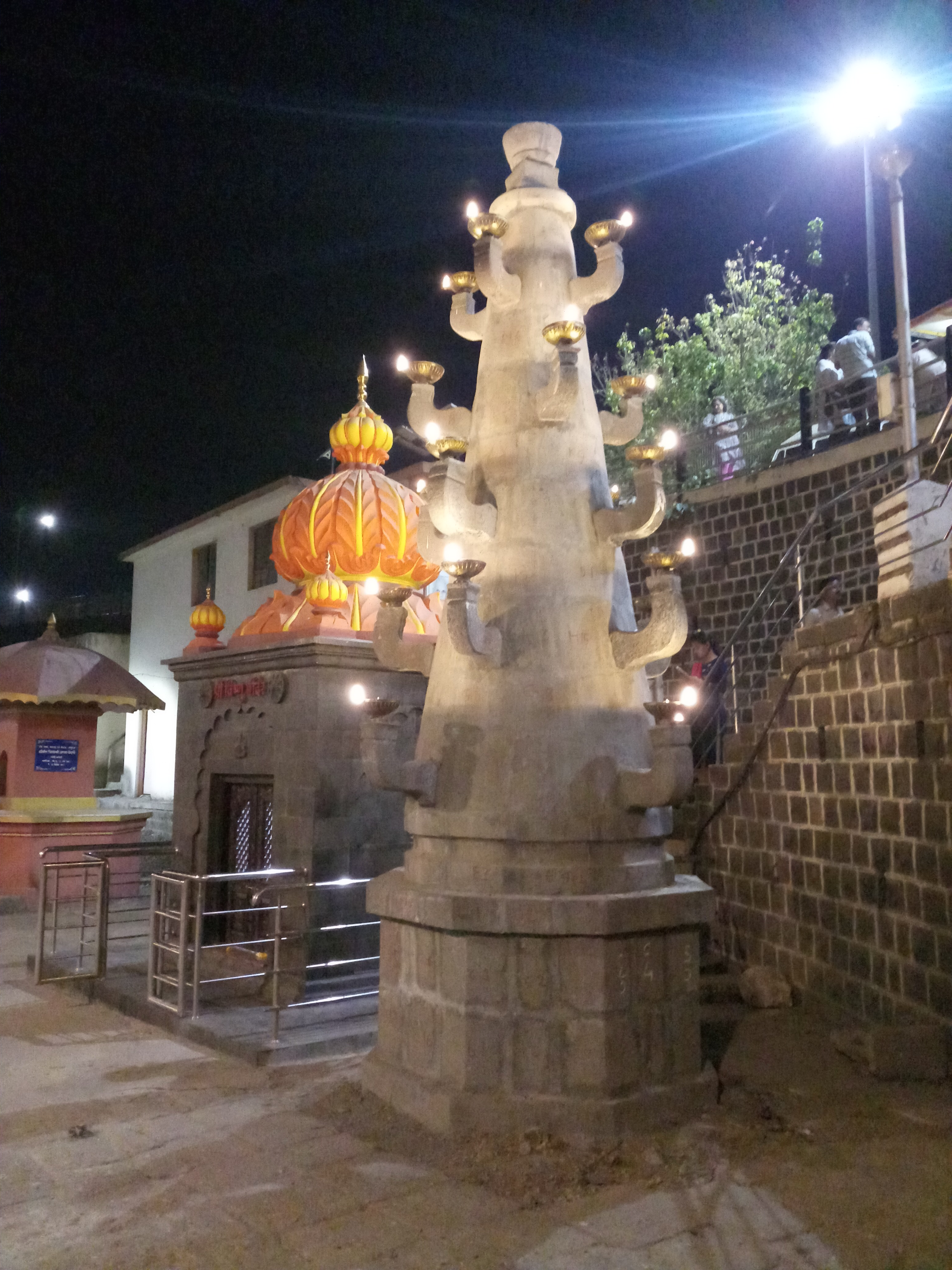
at Omkareshwar Temple of Pune
