= Govindapada =

Guru of Adi Shankara

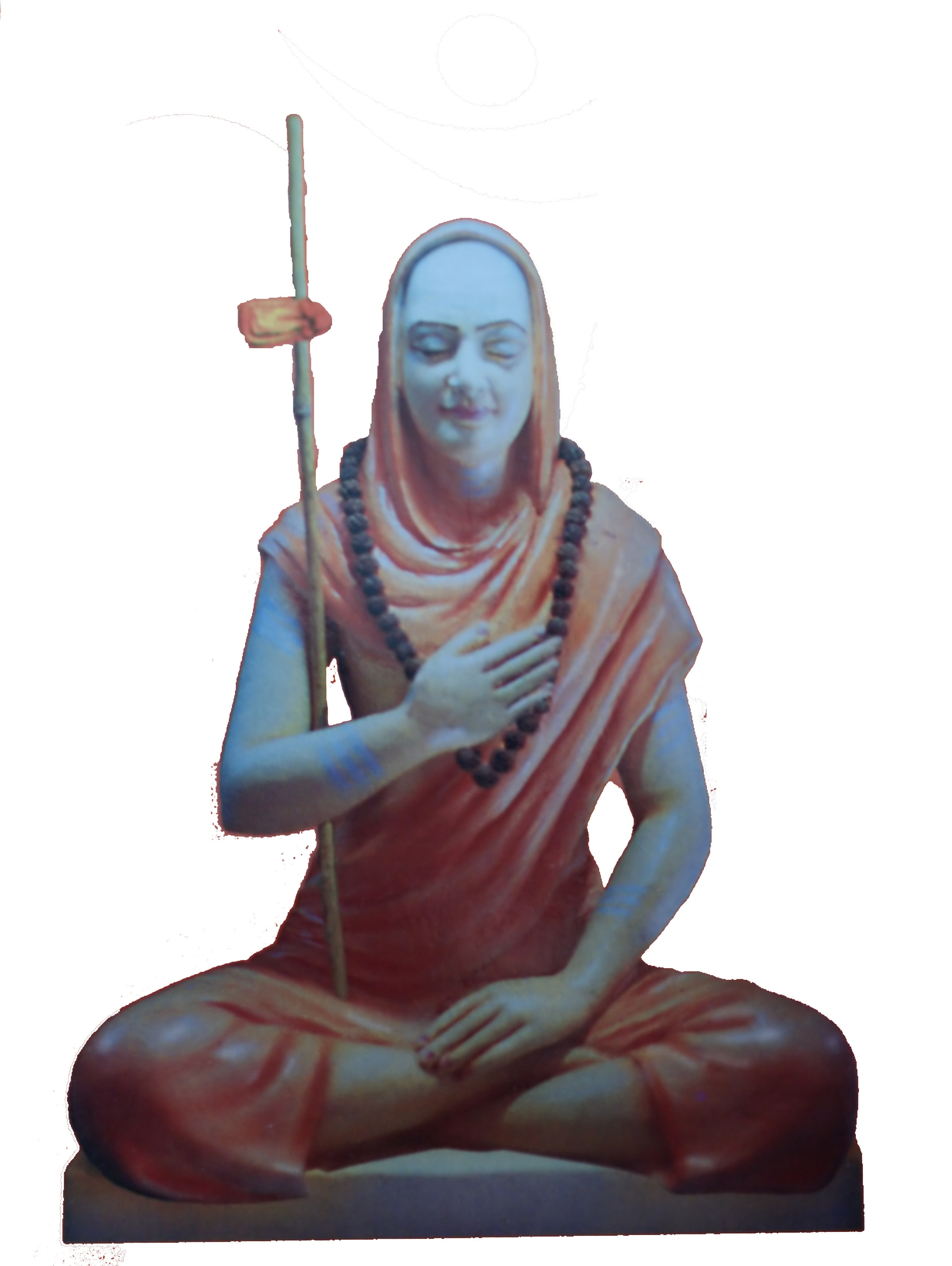
- Gaudapadacharya, the guru of Govinda Bhagavadpada, the grand guru of Adi Shankara and the first historical proponent of Advaita Vedanta, also believed to be the founder of Shri Gaudapadacharya Math

Religious life
- Religion: Hinduism

Govinda Bhagavatpada (IAST Govinda Bhagavatpāda) was the guru of the Hindu philosopher Adi Shankara. He is one of the prominent gurus of the Gaud Saraswat Brahmin community. He is mentioned in all the traditional accounts (Shankara Vijayams) as the teacher of Adi Shankara. He was the disciple of Gaudapada (IAST Gauḍapāda). He is mentioned in the first verse of Adi Shankara's prakaraṇa grantha (treatise) Viveka Chudamani. He is named after Gaudapada in the Guru Parampara (lineage) of Sringeri Sharada Peetham. He is considered to be an incarnation of Shesha.

== Meeting Adi Shankara ==
See Life of Adi Shankara for the biography of Adi Shankara

As per the Madhavīya Shankaravijaya, after leaving Kalady, Adi Shankara reached the banks of the river Narmada where he met Govinda Bhagavatpada at Omkareshwar. Madhavīya Shankaravijaya states that Adi Shankara once calmed a flood from the river Narmada by placing his kamanḍalu (water pot) in the path of the raging water, thus saving his guru Govinda Bhagavatpada who was immersed in Samādhi in a cave nearby. The cave is still maintained in Omkareshwar below the famous Shiva temple. Govinda Bhagavatpada is said to have asked Adi Shankara who he was. Adi Shankara then replied with a verse (which are known as Atma Shatkam or Nirvana Shatkam) composed extempore, that brought out clearly the Advaita philosophy in regard to the Self. Shankara was then initiated as Govinda Bhagavatapada's disciple, thus formally entering sanyasa.

Adi Shankara was then commissioned by his Guru to write a Bhashya (commentary) on the Brahma Sutra and spread the Advaita philosophy far and wide. Gaudapadacharya was the guru of Govinda Bhagavatpada.
