= Krishnadas Shama =

16th-century Goan author

- Born: 16th century Kardalipura, Goa, Portuguese India, Portuguese Empire or Adil Shahi dynasty (now Quelossim, India)

Krishnadas Shama was a Goan author belonging to the Gaud Saraswat Brahmin community. He was born in the village of Quelossim in Goa and was the author of Krishna Charitrakatha. According to verses (ovis) 245–250 of this work, it was commenced on 25 April 1526, or Vaishakh Shukla of shake 1448 according to the Hindu calendar. The original manuscript of this work was discovered by Mariano Saldanha in the Public Library of Braga in Portugal (first 130 pp. of codex 773, Marathi MS, Roman script). The work consists of 19 chapters (ovesvaru) and 3,123 verses (ovis). It is a rendering of the Tenth canto (Adhyaya) of the Bhagavata Purana and may be the first extant prose work by a Goan in the Marathi language.

Shama may also be the author of the Konkani texts contained in codices 771 and 772 of the Public Library of Braga. These codices contain prose stories from the Ramayana and Mahabharata. The manuscripts were found in Rachol Seminary, in the possession of Dom Francisco Garcia. They were transliterated into the Roman script by Jesuit scholars in the 16th century. These texts may be the first extant prose works in Konkani.

== Legacy ==
The latest building of the Goa State Central Library in Panjim was dedicated to Shama in 2011.
