= Vivekacūḍāmaṇi =

Sanskrit poem ascribed to Adi Shankara

- Written: 8th century or later
- Language: Sanskrit
- Subject: Hindu philosophy
- Meter: Varies
- Publication date: 1910 (first print edition)

The Vivekachudamani (Sanskrit: विवेकचूडामणि, romanized: vivekacūḍāmaṇi, lit. 'Crest-jewel of discernment') is a philosophical treatise within the Advaita Vedanta tradition of Hinduism, traditionally attributed to Adi Shankara, though this attribution has been questioned and mostly rejected by modern scholarship. It is in the form of a poem in the Shardula Vikridita metre.

The text discusses key concepts such as the viveka (discrimination or discernment) between real (unchanging, eternal) and unreal (changing, temporal), Prakriti and Atman, the oneness of Atman and Brahman, and self-knowledge as the central task of spiritual life and for Moksha. It expounds the Advaita Vedanta philosophy in the form of a self-teaching manual, with many verses in the form of a dialogue between a student and a spiritual teacher.

== Author ==
While the Vivekacūḍāmaṇi is traditionally attributed to Shankara, this attribution has been questioned and mostly rejected by modern scholarship. (Note: See also arshabodha.org, Sri Sankara's Vivekachudamani, p.3-4, The Question of Authorship of Vivekachudamani)

According to Michael Comans, a scholar of Advaita Vedanta, though the Hindu tradition popularly believes that Adi Shankara authored the Vivekachudamani, this is "most probably erroneous". Comans gives the following reasons for his doubts: the highly poetic style of the Vivekachudamani is not found in other genuine works of Adi Shankara; there is a lack of extensive commentaries (bhasya) on the Vivekachudamani which is unusual given the extensive commentaries on his other works; and unlike Shankara's other genuine works which give minimal importance to nirvikalpa samadhi practices, the Vivekachudamani gives special importance to it. Though the Vivekachudamani is a popular manual on Vedanta, it is probably the work of a later Shankara, and not Adi Shankara, states Comans.

According to Natalia Isayeva, a scholar of Advaita Vedanta, it is "far less probable" that Adi Shankara authored the Vivekachudamani. Sengaku Mayeda, another scholar of Indian Philosophy and Advaita Vedanta, states that though widely accepted as Shankara's work, the Vivekachudamani is likely not his work.

Paul Hacker, an Indologist and scholar of Advaita, set out a methodology for ascertaining authorship of Advaita texts and he concluded that though the Vivekachudmani is unusual in parts, it was likely authored by Adi Shankara. Hacker stated that the definitions of the key concepts, premises and ideas found in the Vivekachudmani match with those in Shankara's established authentic works. Daniel H. H. Ingalls Sr., another influential Indologist, rejected Hacker's conclusion by accepting Hacker's methodology and presenting evidence from its manuscripts that some of the ideas in the text do not fully agree with those of Adi Shankara.

John Grimes, who translated the Vivekachudamani, acknowledges that "modern scholars tend to reject that Adi Shankara composed Vivekachudamani", noting that "traditionalists tend to accept it", and there is an unending "arguments and counter-arguments" about its authorship. Nevertheless, Grimes defends the idea that "there is still a likelihood that Śaṅkara is the author of the Vivekacūḍāmaṇi," arguing that "a strong case can be made that the Vivekacūḍāmaṇi is a genuine work of Shankara's and that it differs in certain respects from his other works in that it addresses itself to a different audience and has a different emphasis and purpose."

Berger proposes that "rather than simply having been written or not written by [Adi] Shankara, the Crown Jewel of Discrimination may be a corporately authored work [of Advaita monasteries] that went through revisions".

Irrespective of the attribution, the Vivekachudmani is a significant work of Advaita. According to Swami Dayananda Saraswati, a Vedanta teacher, "I do not think we lose anything even if the authorship is attributed to any other Sankaracharya of one of the various Sankara-mathas." According to Shah-Kazemi it is "so closely interwoven into the spiritual heritage of Shankara that any analysis of his perspective which fails to consider [this work] would be incomplete".

== Manuscripts ==
Many historic manuscripts of the Vivekachudamani have been found in different monasteries of Advaita Vedanta. These have minor variations, and a critical edition of these has not been published yet. The earliest original Sanskrit manuscript of the Vivekachudamani was published from Srirangam (Tamil Nadu) by T.K. Balasubramania Iyer in 1910. This edition has attracted much of 20th- and 21st-century scholarship, and has been republished in 1983 after some revision and re-arrangement to reflect studies on it since 1910. Other editions have been the basis of a few Indian translations. The five most referred to manuscripts in Advaita scholarship have been published by Samata (Chennai), Advaita Ashrama (Kolkata), Sri Ramakrishna Math (Chennai), Bharatiya Vidya Bhavan (Mumbai), Chinmayananda Ashrama (Mumbai).

== Contents ==
The Vivekachudamani consists of 580 verses in Sanskrit. These cover a range of spiritual topics and their answers according to the Advaita Vedanta tradition of Hinduism.

Vivekachudamani
Section	Verses	Topics
1	1–31	Man's life and quest, spirituality, liberation: basic aspects
2	32–71	The need for a teacher, characteristics of a good teacher, characteristics of a good student
3	72–110	The physical, the body: discriminating the three essences
4	111–135	Nature and effects: five sheaths, three gunas
5	136–146	The goal of spirituality, the nature of bondage, the nature of confusion, the nature of sorrow
6	147–153	Atma and Anatma: discrimination, self-knowledge and bliss
7	154–225	The path to self-knowledge
7	154–164	Annamaya kosha and its negation
7	165–166	Pranamaya kosha and its negation
7	167–183	Manomaya kosha and its negation
7	184–188	Vijnanamaya kosha and its negation
7	189–206	The free soul, what is freedom and liberation, why self-knowledge is necessary
7	207–210	Anandamaya kosha and its negation
7	211–225	Atman, what it is not? what is it?
8	226–240	The absolute Brahman, the atman, the oneness, and the Vedic precepts
9	240–249	That thou art: you are it!
10	250–266	Meditation, its purpose, the method, questions to ponder and reflect on
11	267–338	The method
11	267–276	Understand and end vasanas (impressions, inertia, memorized beliefs and behavior)
11	277–292	Understand and end svadhyasa (superimposed sense of self)
11	293–309	Understand and end ahankara (false ego)
11	310–319	Renounce egocentric work, craving and sense objects
11	320–329	Be true to supreme self, be vigilant against delusion
11	330–338	Cherish oneness, there is no duality, no plurality; dwell in the real, not the unreal
12	339–383	Spiritual growth and nirvikalpa samadhi, the entire universe is you, you are the self of all
13	384–406	Continuous attention to one's true nature
14	407–425	Atma-vichara: self-inquiry
15	426–445	Signs of a realized seer: jivanmukta
16	446–471	The saint without plurality
17	472–520	The disciple of knowledge and the experience of self-hood
18	521–575	Final words of advice from the teacher
	576–580	Epilogue: the liberated disciple and the innermost essence of Vedanta

The text begins with salutations to Govinda, which can be interpreted either as referring to God or to Shankara's guru Sri Govinda Bhagavatpada. It then expounds the significance of Self Realisation, ways to reach it, and the characteristics of a Guru. It criticises attachment to the body and goes to explain the various bodies (śarīra), sheaths (kośa), qualities (guṇa), senses, and energies (prāṇa) which constitute the Anatman. It teaches the disciple the ways to attain Self-realisation, methods of meditation (dhyana) and introspection of the Atman. The Vivekachudamani describes the characteristics of an enlightened human being (Jivanmukta) and a person of steady wisdom (Sthitaprajna) on the lines of Bhagavad Gita.

== Significance ==
The Vivekachudmani has been celebrated as a lucid introductory treatise to Advaita Vedanta. It is, states Berger, not a "philosophical or polemical" text. It is primarily a pedagogical treatise, as an aid to an Advaitin's spiritual journey to liberation rather than "philosophy for the sake of philosophy". It is one of the texts of "spiritual sustenance" in the Advaita tradition.

The Vivekachudmani is one of several historic teaching manuals in the Advaita tradition, one of its most popular. Other texts that illustrate Advaita ideas in a manner broadly similar to the Vivekachudmani but are neither as comprehensive nor same, include Ekasloki, Svatmaprakasika, Manisapancaka, Nirvanamanjari, Tattvopadesa, Prasnottararatnamalika, Svatmanirupana, Prabodhasudhakara and Jivanmuktanandalahari. These texts are not attributed to Adi Shankara. Upadesasahasri, another Advaita teaching manual, is attributed to Adi Shankara.

== Commentaries and translations ==
There are two Sanskrit commentaries on this work. Sri Sacchidananda Shivabhinava Nrusimha Bharati, the pontiff of Sringeri, wrote a commentary titled Vivekodaya (Dawn of Discrimination) on the first seven verses of this work. His disciple, Sri Chandrasekhara Bharathi, has written a Vyakhya or commentary on the first 515 verses of this work.

This work has been translated into various languages, often accompanied by a commentary in the same language. English translations and commentaries include those by Swami Prabhavananda and Christopher Isherwood, Swami Madhavananda, Swami Turiyananda, "Dravidācārya" Śrī Rāmakṛṣṇan Svāmīji and Swami Chinmayananda. Tamil translations and commentaries include those by Ramana Maharshi. Swami Jyotihswarupananda has translated the Vivekachudamani into Marathi.

== See also ==
- Viprata

== Sources ==
- Berger, Douglas L. (2005). "The Vivekacudamani of Sankaracarya Bhagavatpada: An Introduction and Translation (review)". Philosophy East and West. 55 (4): 616–619. doi:10.1353/pew.2005.0032. ISSN 1529-1898.
- Espín, Orlando O.; James B. Nickoloff (2007). An Introductory Dictionary of Theology and Religious Studies. Liturgical Press. ISBN 978-0-8146-5856-7.
- Grimes, John (2004), "Introduction", The Vivekacudamani of Sankaracarya Bhagavatpada: An Introduction and Translation, Ashgate, ISBN 978-0754633952
- Isaeva, Natalia (1993). Shankara and Indian Philosophy. State University of New York Press. ISBN 978-1-4384-0762-3.
- Madhavananda, Swami (1921). Vivekachudamani of Sri Sankaracharya. Advaita Ashrama.
- Mayeda, Sengaku (2006). A Thousand Teachings: The Upadesasahasri of Sankara. Motilal Banarsidass. ISBN 978-81-208-2771-4.
- Shah-Kazemi, Reza (2006), Paths to Transcendence: According to Shankara, Ibn Arabi & Meister Eckhart, World Wisdom
- Usha, Brahmacharini (1990). A Brief Dictionary of Hinduism. Vedanta Press. ISBN 978-0-87481-048-6.
