= Khandepar =

Khandepar Candepar
- Village
- Location in Goa, India Khandepar (India)
- Coordinates: 15.431477°N 74.041192°E
- Country: India
- State: Goa
- District: North Goa

Languages
  - Official: Konkani
- Time zone: UTC+5:30 (IST)
- PIN: 403401
- Vehicle registration: GA
- Website: goa.gov.in

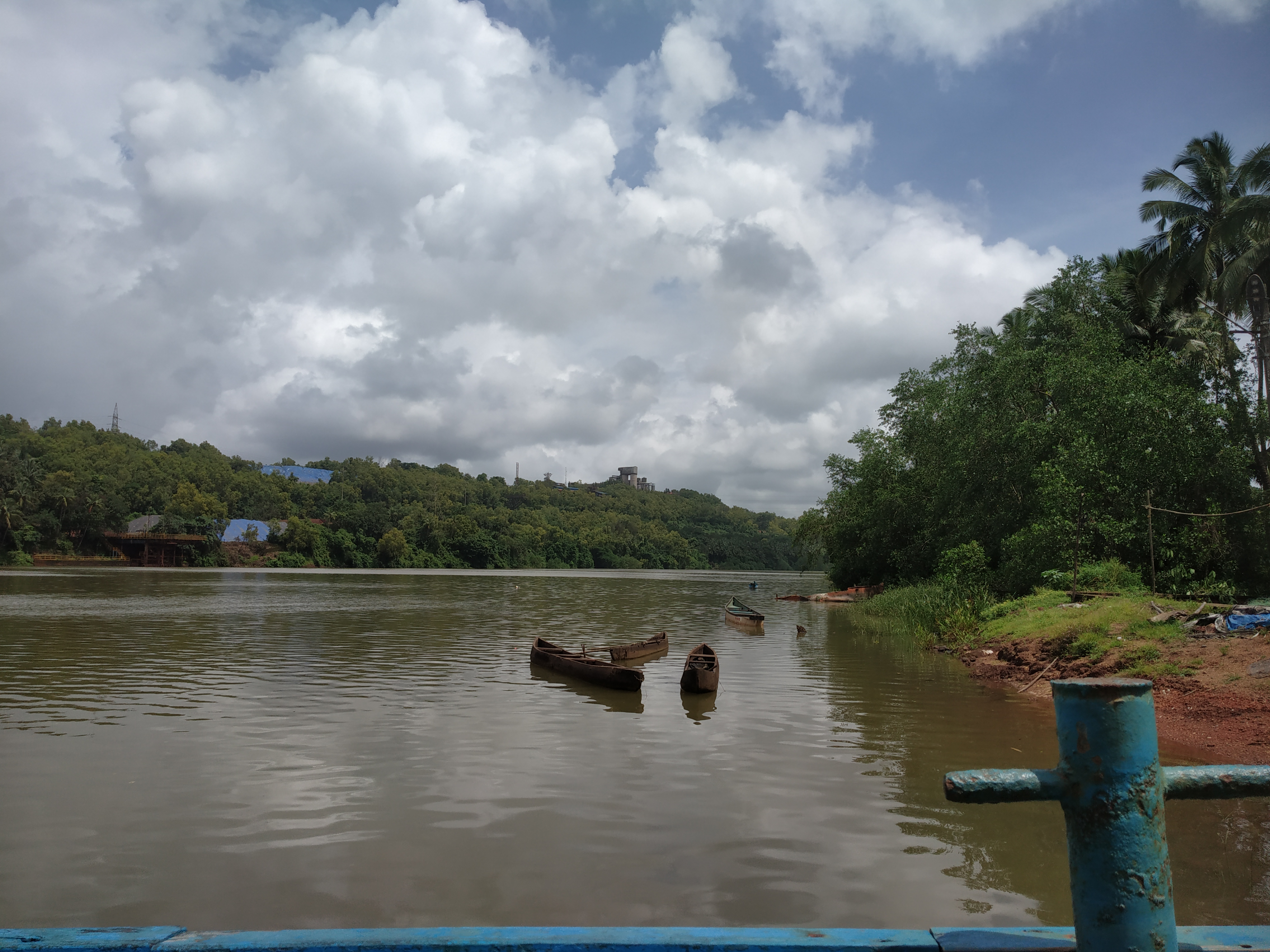
Volvoi ferry, Khandepar, Savoi verem, Goa

Khandepar is a census town in Ponda taluka, North Goa district in the state of Goa, India.
