= Kavale =

- village
- Interactive map of Kavale
- Coordinates: 15.396259°N 73.985591°E
- Country: India
- State: Goa
- District: North Goa

Languages
  - Official: Konkani
- Time zone: UTC+5:30 (IST)
- PIN: 403408
- Vehicle registration: GA
- Nearest city: Ponda
- Website: goa.gov.in

Kavale or Kavalem (Note: Kavle/Kawale/Kawle are other variations for the same name.) is a village in Ponda taluk, in the Indian state of Goa.

Entrance to Shanta Durga Temple

Shanta Durga Temple Complex Lake

== Shanta Durga Temple ==
The Shanta Durga Temple was built in the reign of the Maratha Empire ruler Chattrapati Shahu Maharaj of Satara from 1713 AD to 1738.

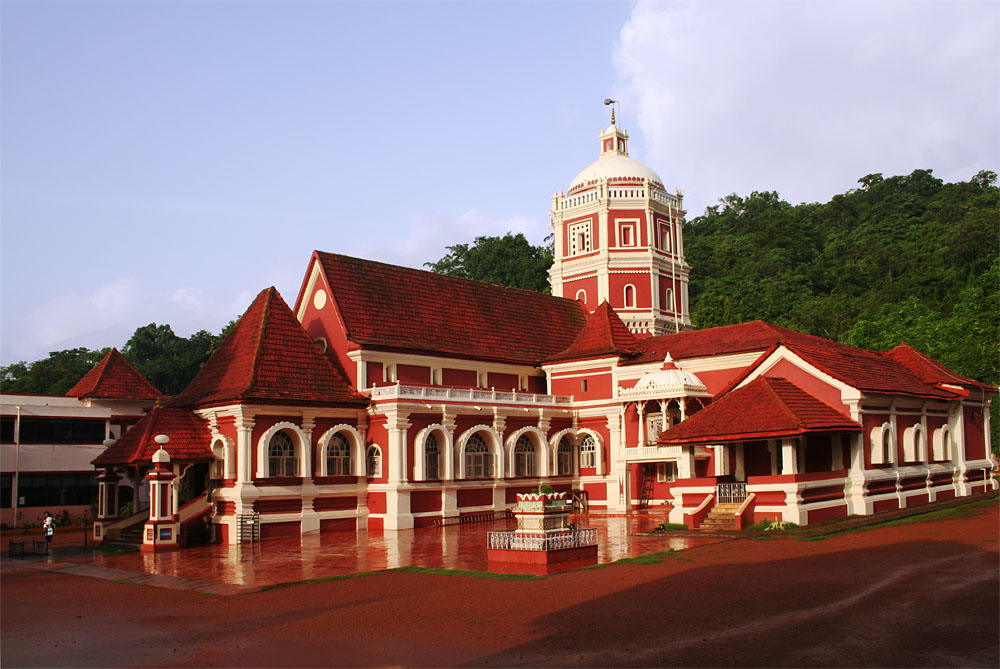
Shanta Durga Temple
