= List of Hindu temples in Goa =

This is a list of Hindu temples in the Indian state of Goa.

Sr.no.	Name	Location	North/ South Goa	Deity	Image
1	Madhav Govind Rameshwar Temple	Agapur, Ponda taluka	North Goa	Madhav & Rameshwar	
2	Mahadev Temple	Tambdi Surla	South Goa	Shiva	
3	Mahalasa Narayani Temple	Mardol	North Goa	Vishnu	
4	Mahalasa Narayani Temple	Verna, Salcete	South Goa	Vishnu	
5	Mahamaya Kalika Devasthan	Kasarpal	North Goa	Kali	
6	Mallikarjuna Temple	Chaudi, Canacona taluka	South Goa	Mallikarjuna (Shiva)	
7	Mandodari Temple	Betki, Khandola	North Goa	Mandodari (Village deity)	
8	Mangueshi Temple	Mangeshi village	North Goa	Shiva	
9	Nagueshi Temple	Nagueshi	North Goa	Shiva	
10	Ramnathi Temple	Ramnathi	North Goa	Shiva	
12	Saptakoteshwar Temple	Narve	North Goa	Shiva	
13	Shanta Durga Temple	Kavlem	North Goa	Shantadurga	
14	Shantadurga Kalangutkarin Temple	Nanora	North Goa	Shantadurga	
15	Shantadurga Kumbharjuvekarin Temple	Marcel	North Goa	Shantadurga	
16	Sharvani Devasthan	Bicholim taluk	North Goa	Sharvani	
17	Betal Temple	Amona	North Goa	Betal	
18	Damodar Temple	Zambaulim	South Goa	Shiva	
19	Vijayadurga Temple	Kerim, Ponda taluka	North Goa	Durga	
20	Vimleshwar Temple	Rivona	South Goa	Shiva	
21	Devaki Krishna Devasthan	Marcel (or Mashel)	North Goa	Devaki, Krishna	
22	Lairai Temple	Shirgao	North Goa	Devi	
23	Damodar Sansthaan	Fatorda, Margao	South Goa	Shiva	
24	Devi Bhagvati Mandir	Pedne, Pernem	North Goa	Bhagvati	
25	Parashuram Temple	Poinguinim, Canacona	South Goa	Parashuram	
26	Shree Nagesh Mahamaya Mandir	Verna Salcete	South Goa	Nagesh Mahamaya	
27	Shri Ram Temple	Bhatulem, Panaji	North Goa	Shri Ram	
28	Goveshwar Mahashiv Mandir	Baingini, Old Goa	North Goa	Shiva	

== See also ==
- Agrashala
- Goan temple
