= Mahamaya Kalika Devasthan Kasarpal =

Temple complex in Goa, India

Coordinates: 15.649°N 73.935°E

Mahamaya Kalika Saunsthan (Devanagari:श्री संस्थान महामाया कालिका) is a temple complex in Kansarpal village of Bicholim taluka in the state of Goa, which belongs to daijna [ daivadnya ] Brahmins of Gomantak, India. The presiding deity of the temple is Kali, worshipped in the form of Mahamaya. The goddess Kali, the terrible and cruel to the demons and evil doers, is worshiped with blood sacrifice in most parts of India. In Goa, however, the fierce invocation of the deity was never popular. As per the tradition, after slaying the demons Madhu and Kaitabha, the deity's anger was soothed and the deity manifested herself in a peaceful (Shanta), gentle (Soumya) form, which is very popular in Goa. This form of Kali is also known as Bhadrakali or Kali who is gracious.

== History ==
The folk tradition believes that this temple might have been constructed during the Chandragupta Vikramaditya’s time. A Copper-plate or tambiapotto (in Konkani) dated 1436 AD, which is in the possession of the Archaeology department of Goa, mentions among various other things the following:

... The Brahmin Devasharma of Kashyapa Gotra, hailing from the region bathed by river Janhavi, fleeing from the invasion of the Turukshas(Muslims), came to Konkan...being always honoured by the King of the Konkan.. ...His descendant Nagadeva, a worshiper of Shiva went to Pallika(Kasarpal)and in presence of Mahajanas, and the copper-smiths of the village, gave on the first day of the month Chaitra of shri Nala of shalivahana era 1358, the village of Varandem(which includes Kasarpal) as nomoxim(gift)to the son of Rupa Shreshti, named Lakshman Shreshti, who was born by the grace of Devi...

Kalamba seems to be another name of the deity though, the name Kalika appears in the copper-plate inscription mentioned above. During Goa Inquisition, when Goa was in turmoil, most of the people of Daivajna caste took refuge in the temple premises to elude conversion to Roman Catholicism and prosecution.

== Iconography ==
The main idol in the sanctum sanctorum is more than 800 years old and is a masterpiece of Kadamba sculptures. The deity is four armed, each hand carrying a sword (Khadga), trident (trishul), Shield (Khetaka) and skull bowl (Kapala) correspondingly. Her mount lion can be seen at her feet.

== Other affiliated deities ==
The temple Panchishta includes the following deities: Devi Panchayatana (worshiped in the main sanctum sanctorum, includes Ganesha, Surya Shivalinga, Shaligrama etc.), Ravalnath, Hedgeshwar, Shetyeshwar, Palnath. A Buddhist statue of Shakyamuni can also be found in the temple, as a remnant of the Buddhist sect that prevailed in Goa till the early 12th century AD.

== The temple architecture ==
The temple is of the style of Goan temple architecture, with a large hall (Sabhamantapa) used for public gatherings during festivals and meetings (a stage and a Nagarkhana which is above the stage is used to play drums and shehnai during specific times of the day and during specific rituals). The temple also has a main hall inside (Chowk), a path for circumambulation (Sarwali) and Sanctum sanctorum (Garbhakud or Garbhagruha) with a huge golden Kalasha. The temple is surrounded by Agrashalas, two gates (Praveshdwaras) and a lamp tower (Deepastambha).

== The devotees and patrons of the temple ==
The deity is believed to be patron deity of the Gomantak Daivadnya Brahmin community of Goa. The patrons of the temples or the Mahajans are divided into four groups:Sashtikar, Bardeskar, Tiswadkar, Antrujkar.

== Festivals ==
The Shishirotsav of Kasarpal temple attracts pilgrims from Goa, Maharashtra and Karnataka. It is a 10-day-long celebration, including the procession of deities in different Vahanas, and various other rites, including Ganga Pujan, Homa, Dhwajarohana, Gulalotsava, Rathotsava. An orchestra known as Suvari is played during the festival which includes musical instruments Ghumot, Kasale, cymbals and Shehnai. Other important festivals are Ratha Saptami, Navaratri, Vasant Puja, Akshay Tritiya, Dasara, Avali Bhojan. Silver Palanquin procession of the deity on every Chaturdashi of the dark fortnight of Hindu lunar calendar is also a major attraction.

== Museum ==
It is the first temple in Goa to have a private museum, named Kaalika Sangrahaalaya. It has objects from the ancient, medieval and modern periods. The museum has around 10 small galleries housing rare antiquities, including stone sculptures, brass lamps, wooden and silver artefacts.

== See also ==
- Goan temple
- Kansarpal
- List of Temples in Goa
- Shantadurga Kalangutkarin Temple, Nanora
