= Vimleshwar Temple =

Indian temple

Coordinates: 15.165°N 74.107°E

Vimaleshwar Temple is located in Rivona village of Sanguem taluka in the state of Goa, India. Vimaleshwar is a form of Shiva and is worshiped in the form of a Shivalinga. It is a "Swayambhu" shivlinga.

The Prabhu Dessai family of Rivona (GSBs) and the Daivajna Brahmins with surname 'Rivonkar' or 'Revankar' are Mahajans of the temple.

== Other affiliated deities ==
- Kamaleshwar
- Mahalakshmi
- Maruti
- Purush
- Ravalnath

== Major festivals ==
- Dasara
- Kalo
- Pindikaotsav
- Shigmo
- Shivratri

== See also ==
- Agrashala
- Goan temple
- Shantadurga Kalangutkarin Temple
- List of Daivajna temples in Goa
