= Narayan Bhaskar Nayak =

Indian author and historian (1899–unknown)

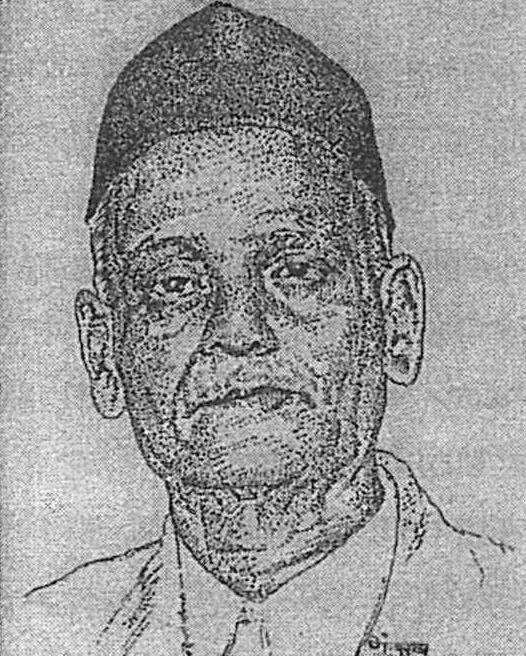
- Born: 25 June 1899; Rivona, Portuguese Goa
- Died: Unknown
- Occupations: Author, historian

Narayan Bhaskar Nayak (25 June 1899 – unknown) is an Indian author and historian from Goa. He is recognized for his extensive literary contributions and detailed research into Goan history.

== Early life and initial work ==
Nayak was born on 25 June 1899 in the village of Rivona. He began writing at the age of fifteen. His early work included an article focused on his native village titled Rishivan, which was featured in the monthly periodical Manoranjan. Subsequently, his essays and articles began appearing regularly across various other monthly magazines, including Navayug, Vividhajnana Vistara, Makaranda, and Lokamitra.

== Publication of Bharatmintra ==
At the age of 22, Nayak ventured into independent publishing by launching a monthly magazine called Bharatmintra in 1921. To establish and maintain the publication, he personally traveled to different regions to secure both writers and subscribers. Because of the ongoing Goan independence movement during that era, the contents of the magazine were subject to mandatory review and approval by the Censor Board before publication. The governing authorities also raised an objection to the title Bharatmintra on one occasion.

In 1955, Nayak established his own printing press in Margao to facilitate the production of the magazine. Although financial constraints eventually compelled him to shut down the printing facility, he overcame these adversities to successfully run the monthly periodical for over 50 years. Through Bharatmintra, historical essays concerning Goa written by Pandurang Pissurlekar were brought to light. Nayak also compiled his own numerous contributions from the magazine and subsequently published them in book form.

== Literary repertoire and historical research ==
Nayak authored approximately 50 books and booklets of varying lengths throughout his career. Among his shorter published booklets are devotional and praise-oriented works such as Ramnathstuti and Bhajananjali. His broader literary publications include titles such as Gomantakiya Niyatakalike, Gomantakatil Marathi Gadya, Gomantakatil Marathi Kavya and a biography, Shri Swami Indrakant Tirtha Hache Charitra.

While Nayak composed both prose and poetry across a diverse range of subjects, his primary academic focus remained the history of Goa. He conducted targeted research on ancient eras, writing about regional ruling dynasties such as the Bhojas and Shilaharas, as well as detailing the periods of Maratha and Portuguese governance.

Beyond mainstream history, he penned educational booklets dealing with traditional village communities (Gramsamstha), Ayurveda, dramaturgy (Natakashastra), and general health. He also dedicated a specific historical volume, Rishivanacho Itihas, to exploring and uncovering the past of Rivona village.
