= Shree Betal temple =

Hindu temple of Goa

Purvas Vetala (Betal)
- बेताळ
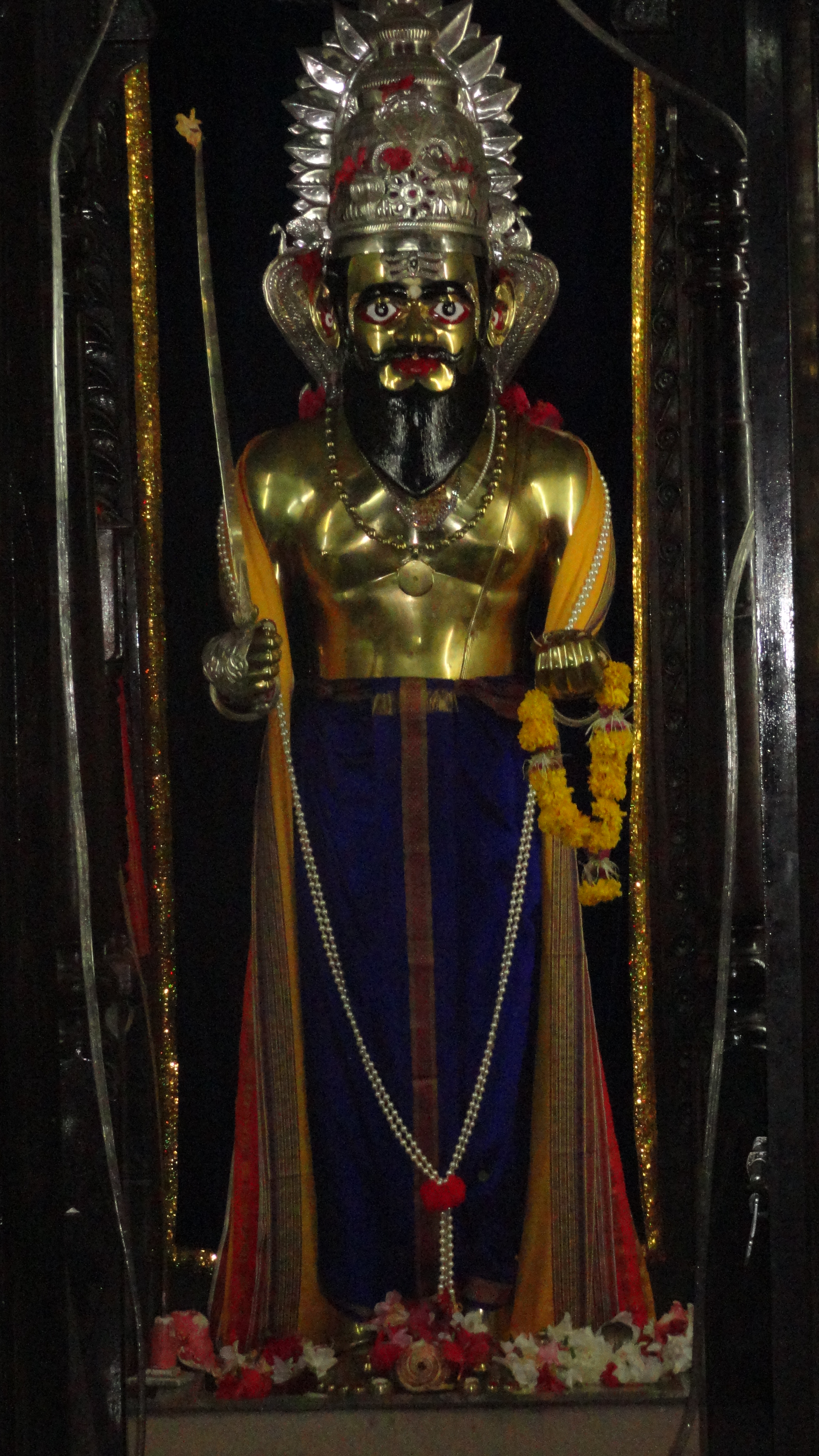
- Betal Idol (Goa)

- Location in Goa

Religion
- Affiliation: Hinduism
- Deity: Betal

Location
- Location: North Goa
- State: Goa
- Country: India
- Coordinates: 15°32′00″N 73°59′00″E

Architecture
- Completed: 1905

Shree Betal
- Affiliation: Lord Shiva
- Mantra: Om Namo Purvas Vetalaya
- Weapon: Sword & Shield

Shri Betal temple (बेताळ) is a Hindu temple in Amona village in the Bicholim taluk of Goa, India. The presiding deity is Betal who is worshiped as a Bhairava form of Shiva in the form of a warrior; normally the idol of Shree Betal is standing in the temple, but during festivals his idol is displayed on a horse back in the village. He is the Gram devata (village lord) of Amona.

There is a temple of Shri Betal in a village named as "Gorli" in Pauri Gharwal district of Uttrakhand. Betal is also the village's gramadevata (village deity). This temple also has a Shiva Pindi and its gana.

The temple's construction prior to 1950 was funded by the Late Shri. Vithal Jagannath Telang and his name has been carved on the flooring accordingly. There is a water well 50 metres away from main temple.

== Deity ==
The temple is dedicated to Purvas Vetal, the warrior god. The deity is also called 'Betal' colloquially.

Betal is a deity of the indigenous Hindu people of India. Betal the Bhairava god of the roaring storm, is usually portrayed as a fierce, destructive deity. Many stories and folklore about the valor and wisdom of Vetala are passed down through generations of local people who worshiped this deity.

== History ==
The original temple was located in Amona at the same place, but later reconstructed from time to time through jeernoddhara (continual maintenance). The temple is believed to be centuries old. Prayers at the temple is offered by the family of Boyini Betaiah, which is derived from the name of the god, along with his six cousins. Priesthood of the temple is bestowed to the family for generations and continues to the present day.

== Devotees ==
The deity is believed to be the patron deity of Maratha clan, Kalavants, Goud Saraswat Brahmin, Rajapur Saraswat Brahmins and Daivadnya Brahmin community spread all over India. Familiar surnames of the devotees are Parab, Sinari, Gawas, Fadate, Salgaonkar, Dhond, Shet, Palankar, Telang etc. several of these surnames have modern adoptions such as Prabhugaunkar, Prabhu Dessai, Amonkar, etc.

== See also ==
- Temples of Goa
- Mangeshi Village
- Shantadurga Kalangutkarin Temple
