= Chikhal Kalo =

Hindu mud festivals celebrated in Goa

- Also called: Mud festival
- Observed by: Goan Hindus
- Type: Religious, cultural
- Date: 11th day of the fourth month of Ashadh in the Hindu calendar

The Chikhal Kalo is a traditional mud festival that celebrates Krishna’s childhood. The festival happens in the Devki Krishna temple in Marcel, Ponda Taluka in North Goa district of the Indian state of Goa.

The word Chikhal Kalo means “Mud Bath.” and the celebration pays homage to the profound bond shared between the farming community of Goa and Mother Earth.

In the festival, people smear oil to the body and play in the mud replicating the games played by Lord Krishna as a child. The festival is attended by both locals and tourists. The festival has been recognised and promoted by the Goa state tourism department.

== See also ==
- Shigmo
- Gadyachi Jatra
