= Sakshi (witness) =

Pure awareness in Hindu philosophy

- Samkhya: Kapila
- Yoga: Patanjali
- Vaisheshika: Kaṇāda, Prashastapada
- Secular: Valluvar

In Hindu philosophy, Sakshi (Sanskrit: साक्षी), also Sākṣī, "witness," is the 'pure awareness' that witnesses all things and events. It witnesses all thoughts, words and deeds without affecting them or being affected by them. It is beyond time and space and the triad of experiencer, experiencing and experienced. Sakshi or Shiva (consciousness), along with Shakti (will/energy/motion), represents Brahman, the totality itself in its most fundamental state, the almighty and all-pervasive, revealed in ancient Hindu philosophical texts.

== Etymology and meaning ==
Sākṣī means 'observer', 'Witness-Self' or the 'Supreme Being'. It is the Atman, the unchangeable eternal Reality, Pure Consciousness, self-luminous and never itself an object of observation. It is the timeless Being that witnesses the ceaseless flow and change in the world of thought and things.

It lends its shine (Chitchhaya) to the "ego" part of the subtle body, which consists of the everchanging Mind, the decision-making Intellect, the Memory and the Illusory Ego.

== Upanishads ==
The word साक्षी (sākṣī) is used in the following verse from Shvetashvatara Upanishad,

एको देवः सर्वभूतेषु गूढः सर्वव्यापी सर्वभूतान्तरात्मा |
कर्माध्यक्षः सर्वभूताधिवासः साक्षी चेता केवलो निर्गुणश्च ||

"The Lord is hidden in the hearts of all.
The eternal witness, pure consciousness,
He watches our work from within, beyond
The reach of the gunas (attributes of mind)."
(Shvetashvatara Upanishad Sl. VI.11, translated by Eknath Easwaran)

The Varaha Upanishad (IV) refers to one of the seven Bhumikas which is of the form of pranava (Aum or Om). It has four parts (akāra, ukāra, makāra and ardhmātra) due to the difference of sthula (gross), sukshama (subtle), bija (causal) and sakshi (witness). Their corresponding avasthas (states of consciousness) are – waking, dreaming, dream-less sleep, and turiya. The state of consciousness identified with the Sakshi essence is 'turiya'.

== Panini ==
Panini states that the term indicates a direct seer or eyewitness (Panini Sutras V.ii.91). Sakshi means Ishvara, the चेता (cetā), the sole Self-consciousness, who is the witness of all, who gives consciousness to every human being, thereby making each rational and discriminatory.

== Vedanta ==
Vedanta speaks of mind (chitta), or antahkarana ('internal instrument'), and matter as the subtle and gross forms of one and the same reality. The field of mind (Chittakasha) involves the duality of subject and object, the seer and the seen, the observer (drg) and the observed (drshya); this duality is overcome in the field of pure Consciousness. Such knowledge, says Sankara, does not destroy or create, it only illumines. According to the Drg-drshya-Viveka:

"When form is the object of observation or drshyam, then the eye is the observer or drk; when the eye is the object of observation, then the mind is the observer; when the pulsations of the mind are the objects of observation, then Sakshi or the Witnessing-Self is the real observer; and it is always the observer, and, being self-luminous, can never be the object of observation." When the notion and the attachment that one is the physical body is dissolved, and the Supreme Self is realized, wherever one goes, there one experiences Samadhi.

Swami Sarvapriyananda explains it thus:

"See, this table is an object of experience to my eyes. My eyes and the body are objects of experience to my mind. And my mind is an object of experience, I cannot deny it, it's a fact ...to what? That awareness which experiences the mind from within. That awareness which cannot be objectified. That is called, for want of a better term, because it witnesses, it shines upon, illumines every movement of the mind, every thought, every idea, every memory, every feeling, it's called the Witness. In Sanskrit: sakshi."
