= Shantadurga Kalangutkarin Temple =

Hindu temple in Goa, India

- Śāntā durgā
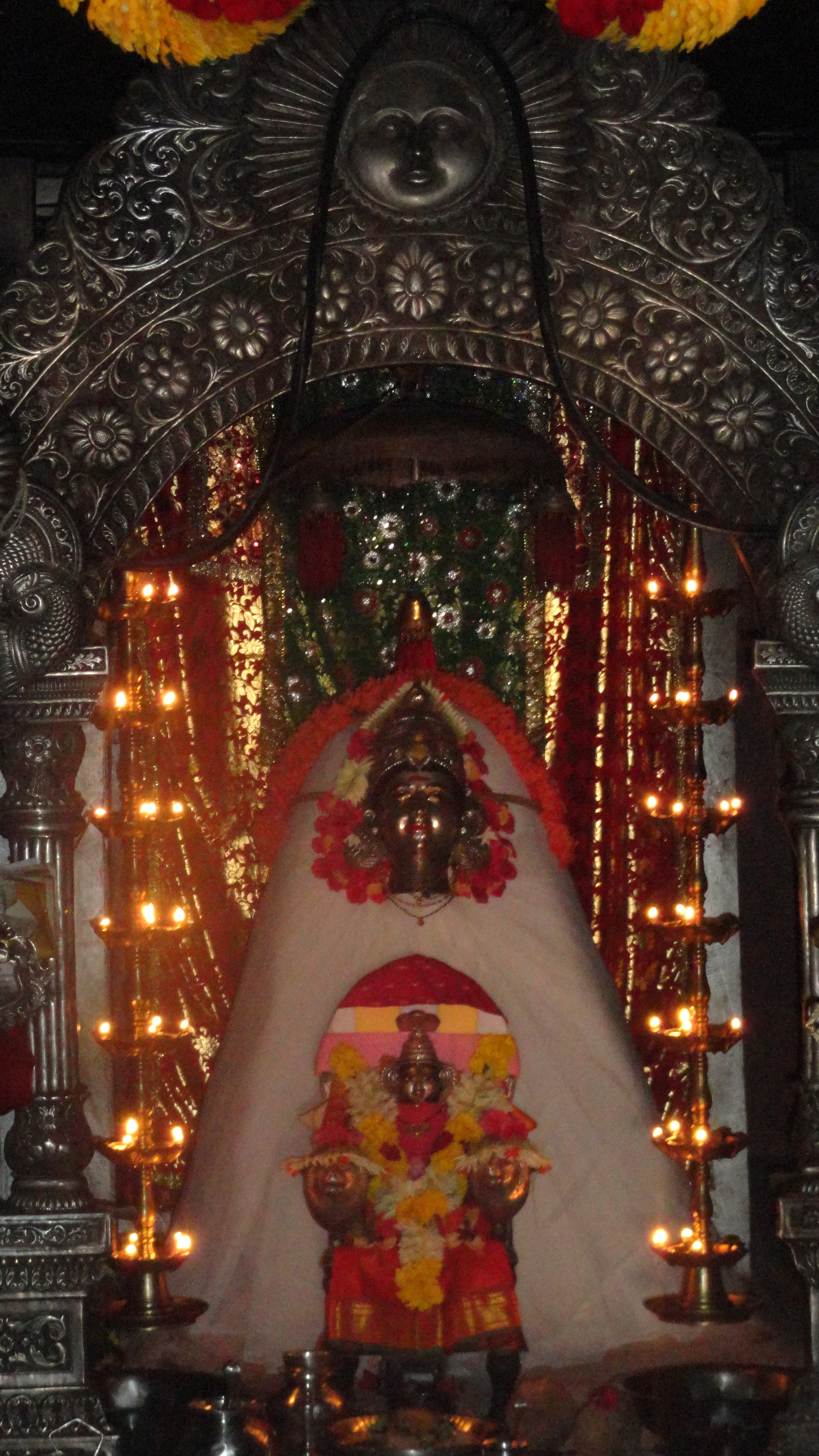
- Shantadurga Kalangutkarin Idol(GOA)

- Location in Goa

Religion
- Affiliation: Hinduism
- Deity: Shantadurga

Location
- Location: North Goa
- State: Goa
- Country: India
- Coordinates: 15°38′05″N 73°55′31″E

Architecture
- Completed: 1905

Shri Shantadurga (Kalangutkarin) Devasthan Nanora is a Hindu temple in Nanoda village, Bicholim taluka in Goa. The goddess Shantadurga is worshiped in the form of Vishweshwari.

== History ==
The original temple was located in Calangute near Mapusa City Taluka Bardez. In the 17th century, due to forceful conversion of Hindus by Portuguese invaders, the temple was shifted to Nanora in Bicholim Taluka, where most such temples shifted. Nanora is situated between city Assonora and Mulgaon in South. Mulgaon is famous for temples which were moved from Salcette (Shri Dev ShantaDurga Rawalnath Panchaytan Devasthan & Shri Shatadurga Ravalnath Maydekar Devashtan) and Kansarpal in North which is famous for Mahamaya Kalika Devasthan Kasarpal, where as west of Nanora is Advalpal, which is famous for Kuldevta of Goud Saraswat Brahmins Sharvani Devastan and east of Nanora is the village of Ladfe and the city of Bicholim.

It was repaired in the 1990s when the temple was made into a marble masterpiece.

The main priest is from the Bhuskute family (Kokanstha Brahmins). The temple has a Dipa Stambha and agrashalas (guest houses).

== Deity ==
The temple is dedicated to Shantadurga, the goddess who mediated between the gods Vishnu and Shiva. The deity is also called 'Santeri' colloquially. Local legends tell of a battle between Shiva and Vishnu. The battle was so fierce that the god Brahma prayed to Parvati to intervene, which she did in the form of Shantadurga. Shantadurga placed Vishnu on her right hand and Shiva on her left hand and settled the fight.

The deity of Shantadurga is shown as holding two serpents, one in each hand, representing Vishnu and Shiva. She is then said have gone to Kalangut, a village in Bardez Taluka. The main idol in the sanctum sanctorum is more than 800 years old and is in the form of lingam.

== Devotees ==
The deity is believed to be patron deity of 96 Kulee Maratha, Kalavants, Bhandari, and Rajapur Saraswat Brahmins community spread all over India. Familiar surnames of the devotees are Sawant, Gad, Desai, Naik, Kalangutkar, Kangutkar, Kalgutkar, Karangutkar, Kandolkar, Desai, Gawas, Vernekar, Tivrekar etc. The Sawant family are spread in Assagao, Oxelbag, Guirim and Mapusa; while Gad Desai are spread in Camurlim, Assagao, Keri, Morjim. The Desai are settled in a small village called Pirna of Desai Wada, Pirna Bardez, Goa.

== Festivals ==
- The main festival of the temple is called as Shishirotsav (popularly known as Shigmo). It is a 10-day celebration and includes procession of deities in different Vahanas with other rituals like kalotsav, Homa, Dhwajarohana, Gulalotsava, Rathotsava, etc.
- Navaratri
- Vasant Panchami
- Akshay Tritiya
- Shravani somvar The First Shravani Somvar is Celebrated by Desai of Desai wada, Pirna, Bardez, Goa.
- Dasara

=== Navo Somvar ===
Navo Somar is an annual palanquin (palkhi) festival celebrated in Divchal, dedicated to the deity Shri Shantadurga. The event marks the resumption of the deity's weekly palanquin procession following the conclusion of the Chaturmas period. Originally observed as a local town procession, the celebration has expanded over time into a large-scale festival resembling a major fair (zatra).

==== Significance ====
Shri Shantadurga is revered as the gramdevta (village deity) of Divchal and is considered an active sacred place (jagrut devasthan). The deity occupies a significant place among the local residents, who customarily invoke her name before undertaking any auspicious work. Monday is regarded as the specific day dedicated to the goddess, and it is a traditional custom for devotees to visit the temple for darshan on this day.

While a weekly palanquin procession is generally held throughout the year, the practice is completely suspended during Chaturmas. The festival of Navo Somar specifically takes place on the particular Monday when these weekly palanquin processions resume after the Chaturmas period ends.

==== Procession and rituals ====
The festival features day-long religious rituals conducted at the Shri Shantadurga temple. The palanquin procession of the goddess commences in the evening and journeys through various localities, including Bhitalli Peth, Somawar Peth, Bhayli Peth, Badde, and Sundar Peth, before returning to the temple by the following afternoon.

A dindi troupe performing devotional songs (bhajans) accompanies the palanquin throughout the journey. Musical assemblies (gayanachyo baithaki) are arranged at three designated spots along the route: Bhitalli Peth (Math), the local bus stand, and near the banyan tree in Badde. As the deity passes by, households welcome the palanquin by lighting lamps, and married women perform the honti bharap ritual by offering a blouse piece (khan) and a coconut to the goddess.

==== Cultural celebrations ====
Navo Somar is celebrated as a joyous festival by the people of Divchal, drawing the deity's mahajans (hereditary patrons) and devotees from various locations. In preparation for the day, local residences are repainted and decorated with bright illuminations.

The primary highlights of the festival include:

- Public displays of attractive pictorial tableaux arranged in front of houses.
- Dedicated art, picture, and rangoli exhibitions.
- All-night classical vocal concerts featuring prominent musical artists.
- A commercial fair (feria) organized within the town, offering a variety of goods for sale.

== See also ==
- Temples of Goa
- Shri Gaudapadacharya Math
- Kavale
- Mangeshi Village
- Mangueshi Temple
- Shanta Durga Temple
- Kansarpal
- Mahamaya Kalika Devasthan Kasarpal

== Gallery ==
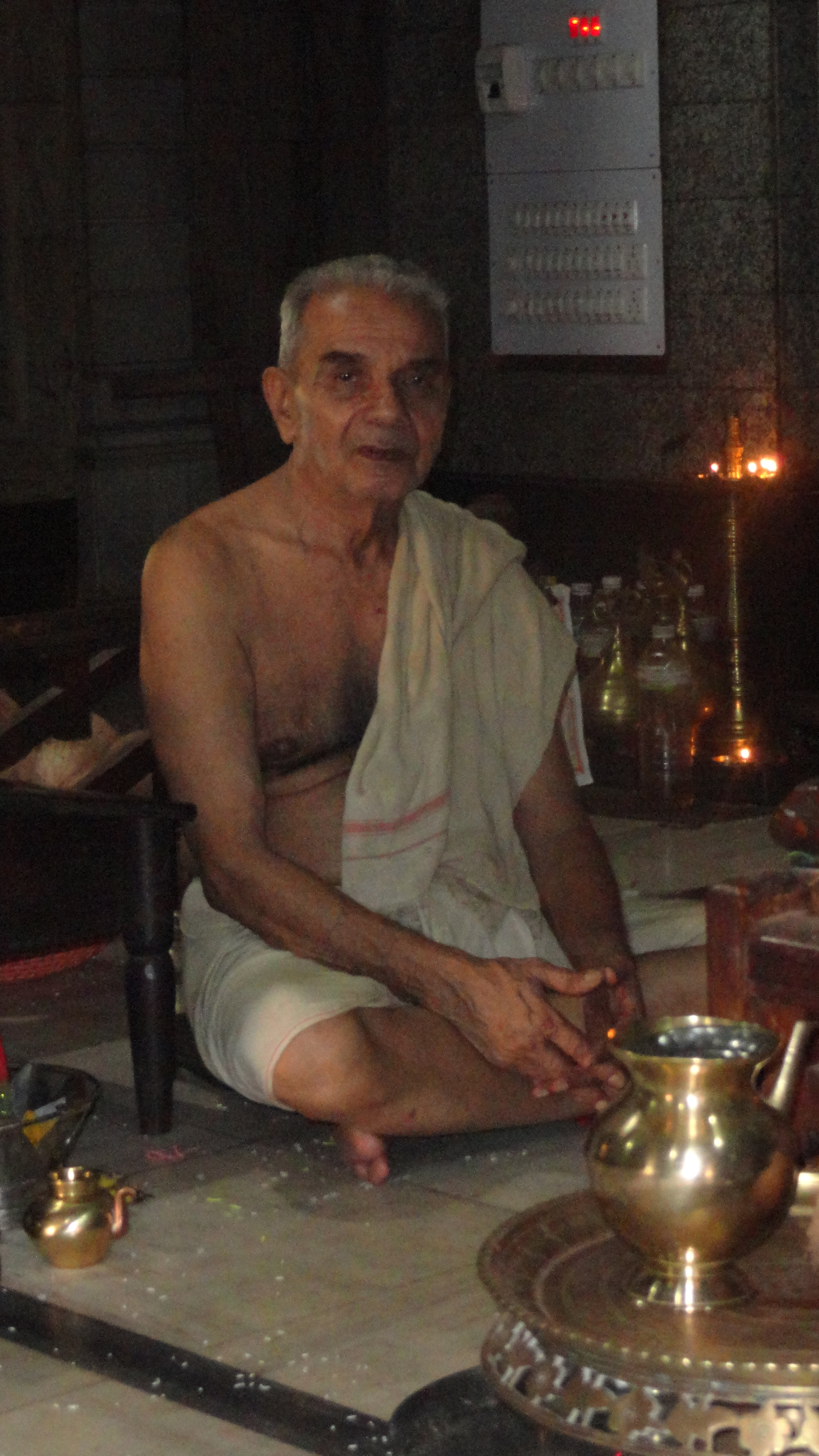
Poojari (Krishna Bhuskute), Goa

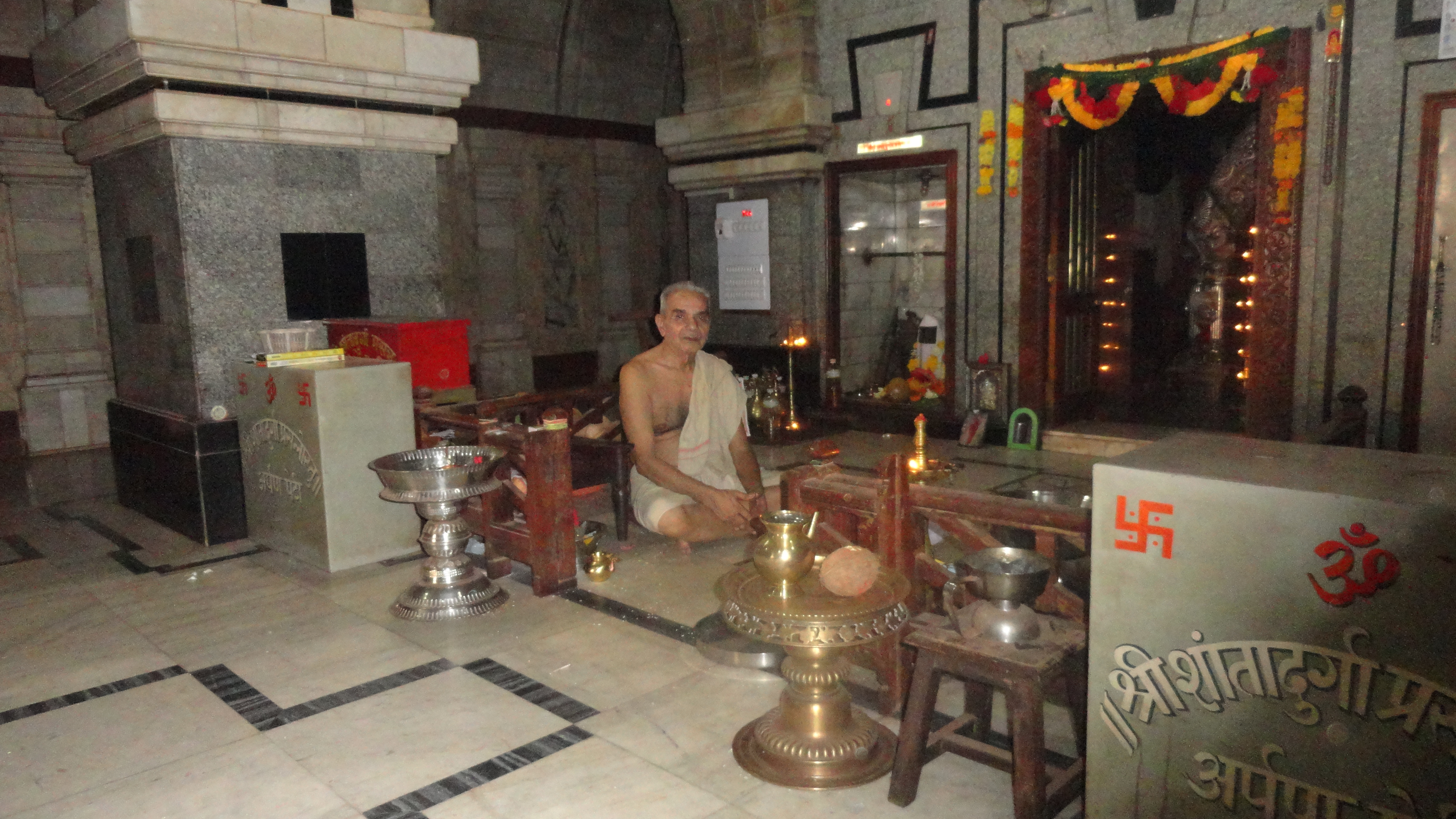
Shantadurga Temple Interior, Goa

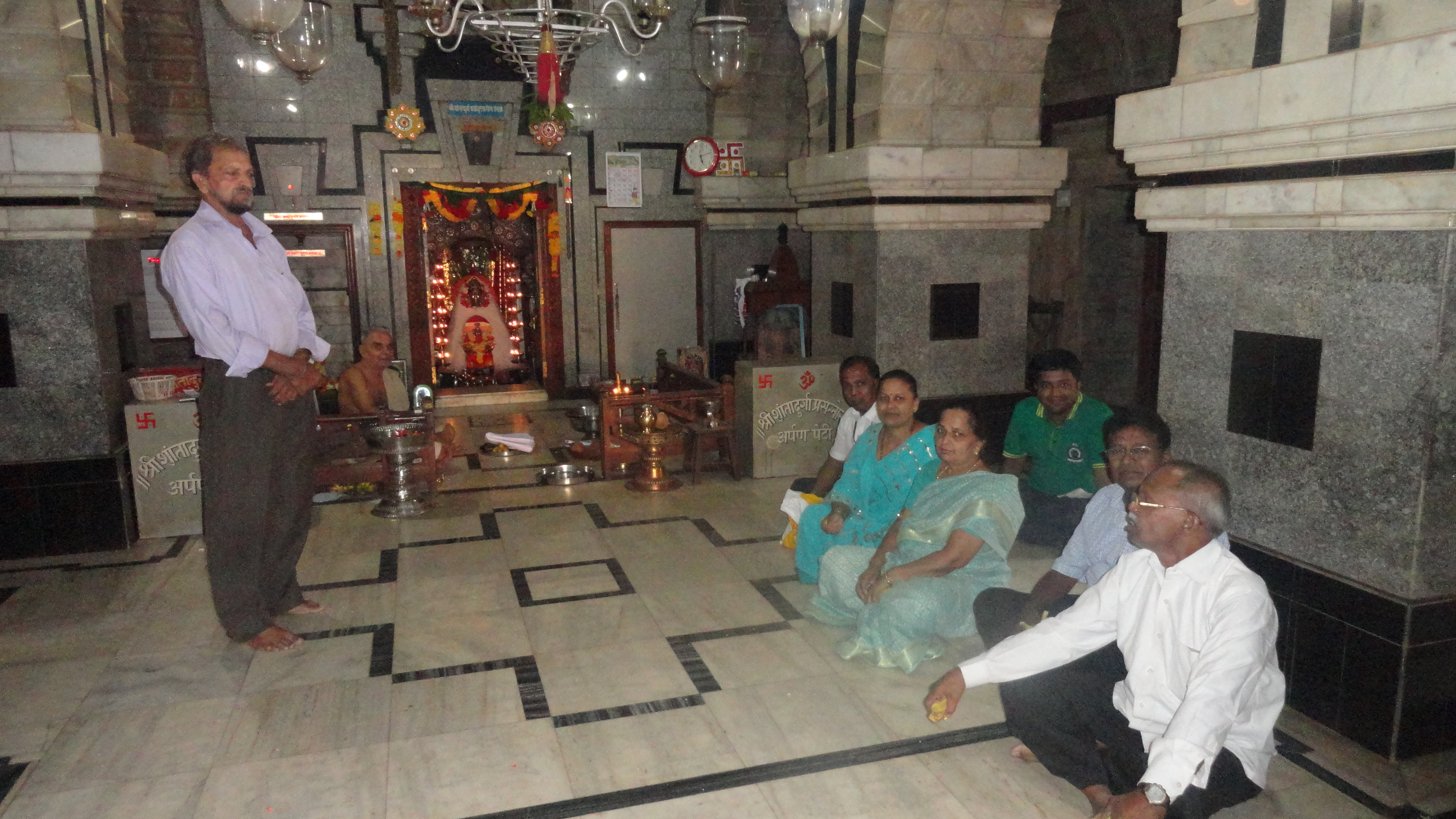
Shantadurga Temple Mahajan, Goa

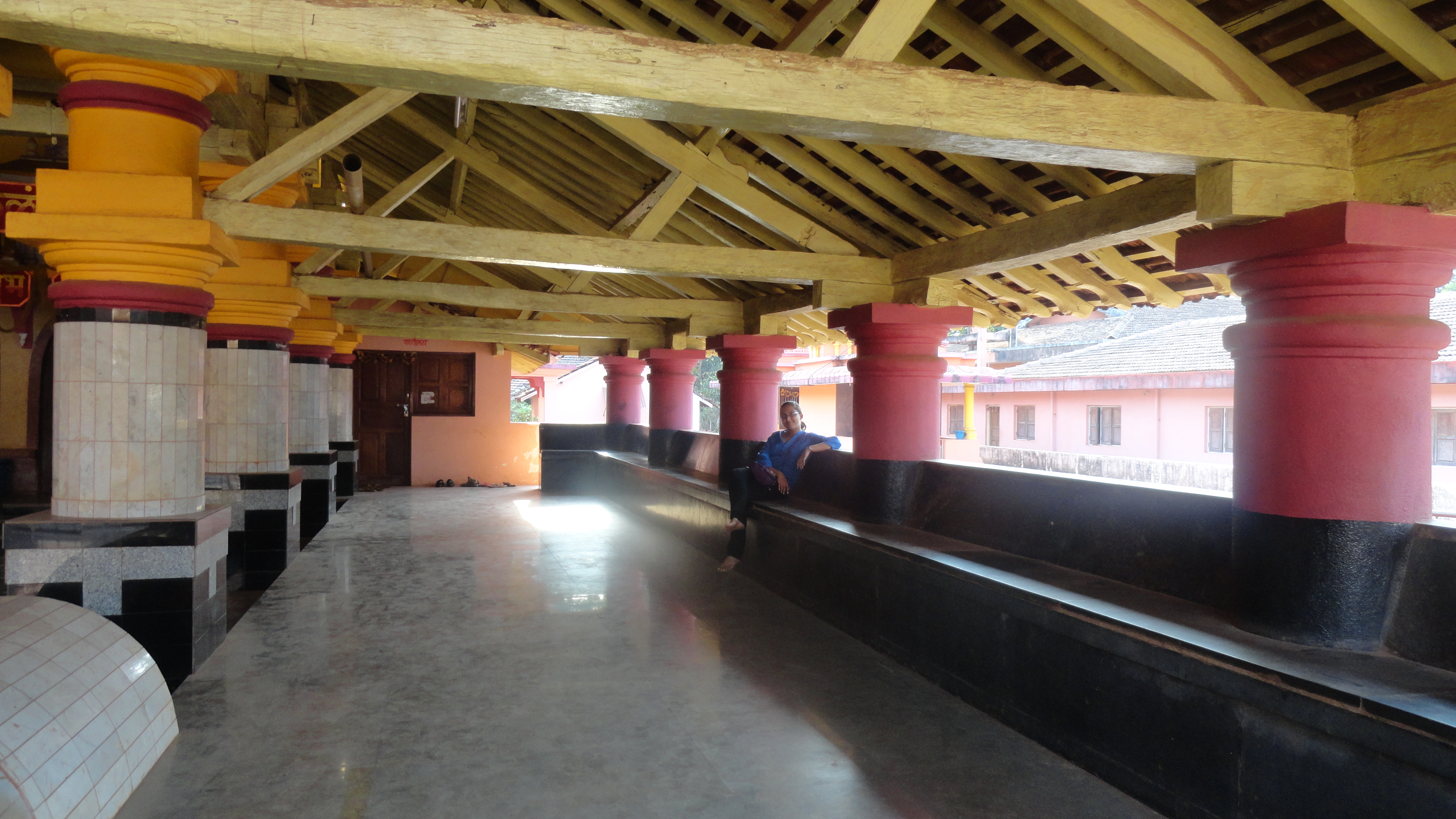
Shantadurga Temple Exterior, Goa
