= Ravalnath =

Hindu deity worshipped in Goa

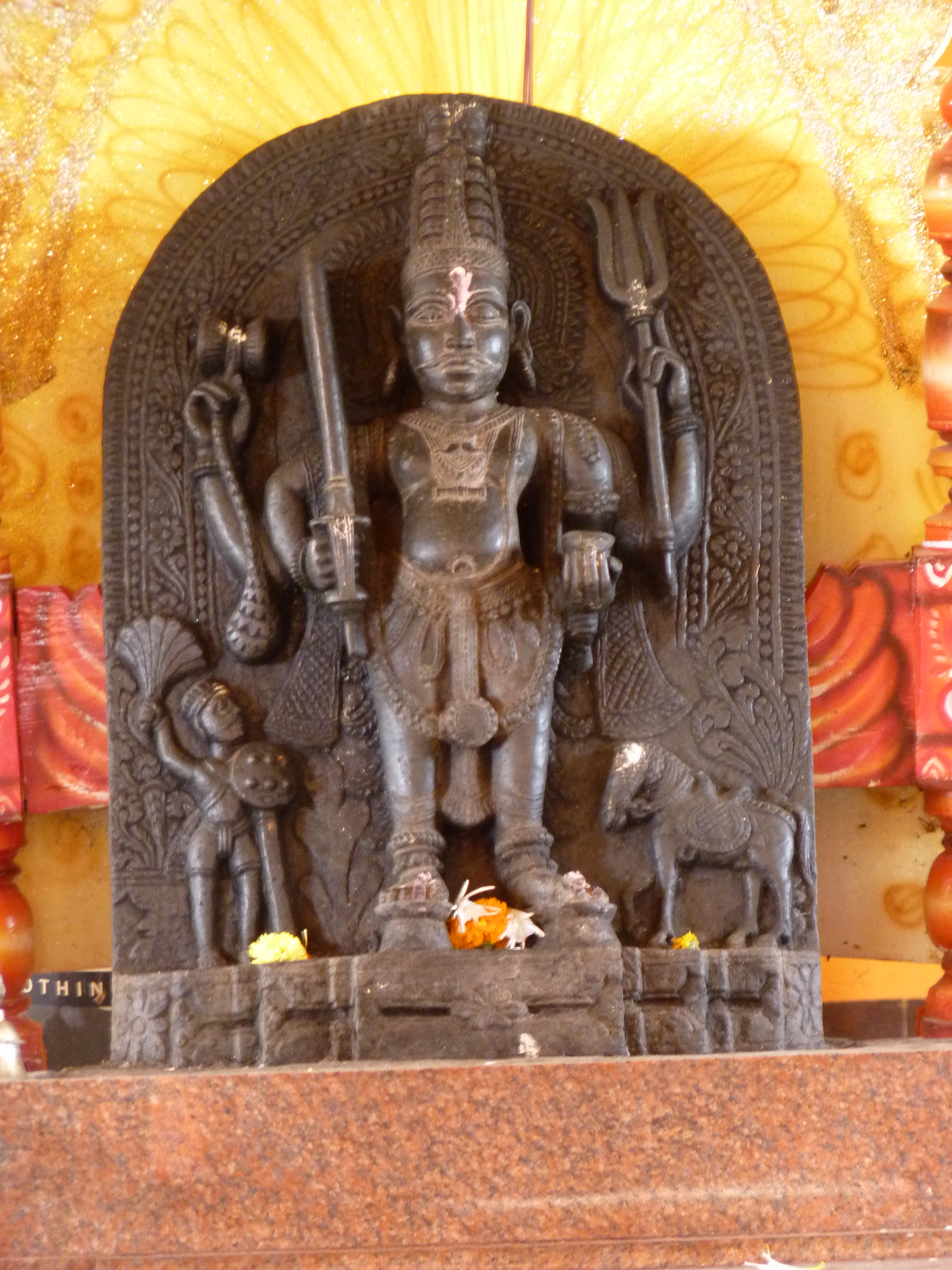
Ravalnath, temple near Wados, Sindhudurg, Maharashtra

Ravalnath (Konkani: रवळनाथ, Ravaḷhanāth), also widely known as Roulu, (रवळू, Ravaḷhu)^{[a]} is a popular Hindu deity in Goa and the Sindhudurg district of coastal Maharashtra, in western India. Shrines of Ravalnath are also found in border areas of Belgaum specially in Karle and Uttar Kannada districts as well as coastal areas of Karnataka. He is worshipped as the main deity or an affiliate deity in most temples of Goa. He is associated with the guardian aspect of Shiva.

Ravalnath is a guardian deity (Kshetrapala) who protects the locality from climatic disasters, witchcraft and snakebites. Ravalnath along with Santeri, Bhumika, Bhutnath and Betal is a popular folk deity worshipped as Gramadevata (village god) in most villages of Goa and Sindhudurg of Maharashtra.

== Etymology ==
The origin of word Ravalnath is a matter of conjecture. The word Ravalnath is derived the word from the word Ruru, who is one of the Ashta Bhairava, eight forms of the god Bhairava - a ferocious aspect of the god Shiva.^{[b]} The iconography of Ravalnath is same as that of Bhairava. Word ravala is also rerived from the word "ravaNa" which means "screaming","yelling", which is same as "ruru" as mentioned earlier and vedic corpus attributes these epithets to different forms of "Rudra". According to Shenoi Goembab, the word Raval (from the word Ravalnath) comes from the word Rahulbhadra which was also the personal name of Buddhist philosopher Nagarjuna. Rahul was also the name of Buddha's son. As per his view during the Buddhist period, some Buddhists might have come to Goa and the worship of Ravalnath was mainly due to this Buddhist tradition. These views of Shenoi Goembab are not accepted by mainstream scholars. Some other speculations suggested that the word Ravalnath is derived from Tamil word Iravalnath and in Tamil Iraval means begging for alms, and is connected to Bhikṣāṭanamūrti aspect of Shiva. Ravalnath is sometimes considered as one of the three hundred Gaṇas of Shiva. Yet others derive the word "ravala" from the word "roinn" of Mundari origin meaning an ant-hill.

The ritual worship of Ravalnath is supposed to have been influenced by Natha sampradaya, it is suggested that Nath cult absorbed Ravalnath as suggested by the suffix nath .

The earliest inscription referring to Ravalnath, called Ravaluba, is dated to the Hoysala period. In another inscription from Goa, Ravalnath is referred to as Ravaloba as well as Ravaleshwar. Southern Silaharas, who ruled North Goa and the present Sindhudurg and part of Ratnagiri district and Kadambas of Goa, were devotees of Shiva. However, references to Ravalnath are not found either in Silaharas or Kadamba inscriptions. There are a two inscriptions in Nagari script and from Velus village of Sattari taluka referring to Ravalnath from Vijayanagara period. Famous Jyotiba of Kolhapur is also called Ravalnath, and is tutelary deity of Sendraka (Shinde) royal house, masses and the upper castes alike.

== Iconography ==
As per shastra icons of Ravalnath are in accordance with that of Ruru Bhairava which is:

निर्वाणं निर्विकल्पं निरूपजमलं निर्विकारं क्षकारं हुङ्कारं वज्रदंष्ट्रं हुतवहनयनं रौद्रमुन्मत्तभावम्। भट्कारं भक्तनागं भृकुटितमुखं भैरवं शूलपाणिं वन्दे खड्गं कपालं डमरुकसहितं क्षेत्रपालन्नमामि॥

Thus Ravalnath is epicted standing, with his left leg slightly bent. He has four hands and holds in the front right hand sword (Khaḍga) and in the left hand bowl of ambrosia (Pānapātra), in the lower right hand a trishula (trident) and in left hand, a damaru (drum). He wears a crown, a garland of human skulls (Runḍamāla) and a dhoti. He has a moustache. A female attendant with a fly-whisk (Cāmara) may be shown on his side; occasionally two attendants on either side are seen. Ravalnath is also worshiped in the form of Linga (Shiva's aniconic form). A horse is mostly depicted as his mount in iconography.

== Worship ==
Ravalnath is a popular deity of all social classes in coastal Maharashtra and Goa. Although, the priest here are usually from Gurav community who perform the daily Pooja in the temple and do Kaul Prasad for the devoties.

Here Ravalnath is Kshetrapala and Bhairava and is worshipped according to the rituals prescribed for him.

The rituals for Ravalnath are especially performed between Dasara to Kojagiri Purnima and on Shigmo in some places. Icons of Ravalnath (as well as some other local guardian deities) are usually images, but festive bantons called Taranga, decorated with nine yard sarees and a metal palm or a face of the deity is fitted on the top of the banton. Possessions (Bhaar or Avsar) is a very important aspect of Ravalnath worship, where the god communicate and bless the devotees via a possessed medium. Blood sacrifices of cocks or goats are offered to him in some places. The ritual of sprinkling the blood of the cocks offered to tarangas on cooked rice is called charu.

== Temples ==
There are eight independent temples of Ravalnath in Goa where he is the presiding deity and more than 42 shrines where he is venerated as a subsidiary (Parivar devatā).

== Notes ==
- Most of the old documents of the colonial era mention the name Roulu which is a Portuguese version of the local word Ravalu. Ravalu or Roulu is also a common given name in Goa.
- As mentioned about Ravalnath has been commonly known as Raulu, the word Raulu can be derived from the word Ruru, In Konkani Ru can be sometimes pronounced as Rau as in Rudra is pronounced as Roudiro. The change of ra (Devanagari:र) to la (Devanagari:ल), also common in most Indo-Aryan languages, furthermore in Konkani la (Devanagari:ल) changes to ḷha(Devanagari:ळ).
