= Hinduism in Goa =

Ancient tradition in Goa

Hindus in Goa
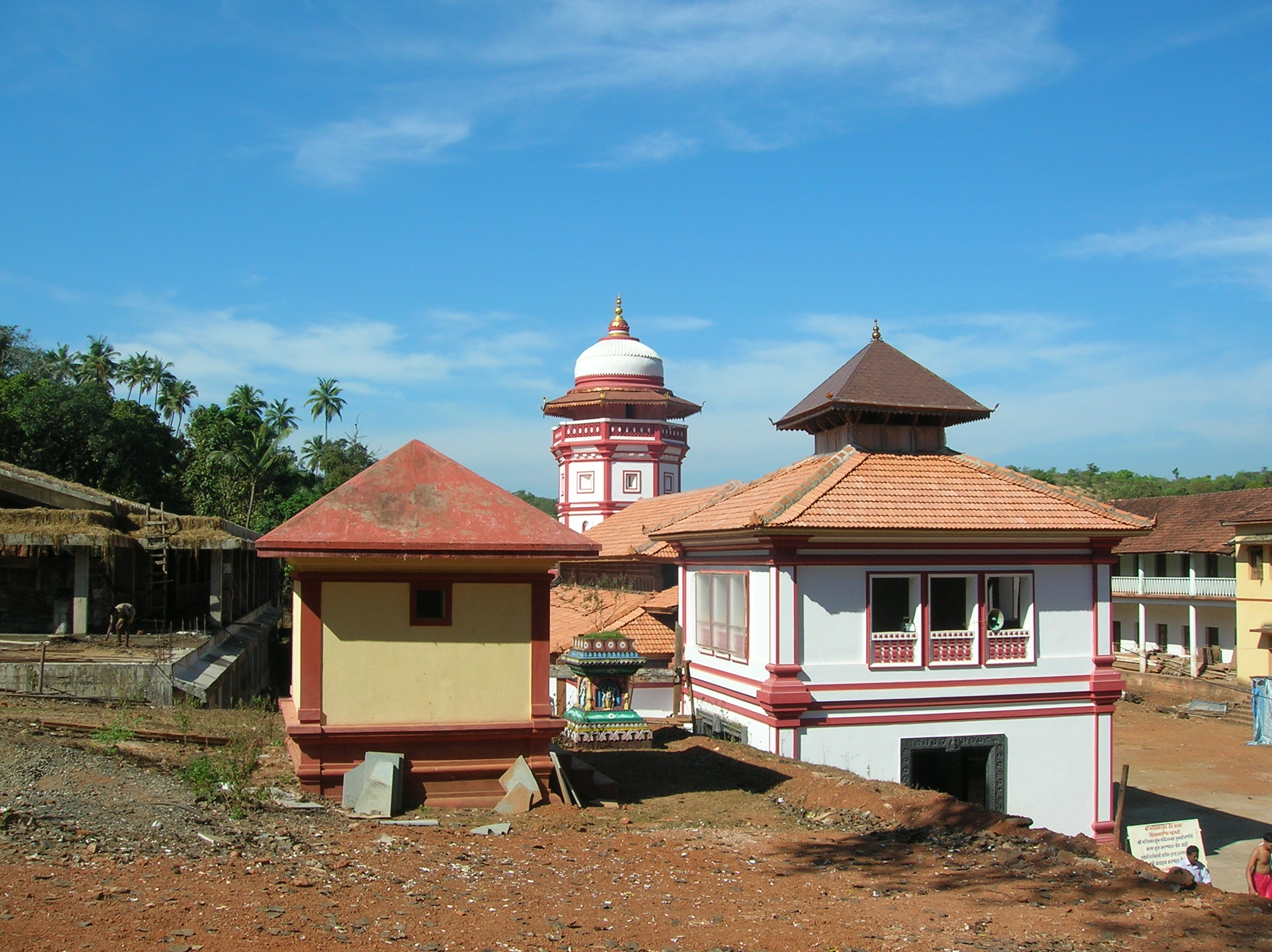
- Mallikarjuna temple, canacona

Total population
- 962,640 (2011)

Languages
- Liturgical: Sanskrit; Native: Konkani; Also spoken: Marathi, Hindi, Gujarati, Kannada

Hinduism is the majority religion of people living in Goa. According to the 2011 census, in a population of 1,458,545 people, 66.08% were Hindu.

== History and roots ==
Due to the Christianisation of Goa, over 90% of the Goans in the Velhas Conquistas became Catholic by the 1700s. The Novas Conquistas, which came under Portuguese rule later, remained majority Hindu. Goan emigration to British India and the rest of the world, and corresponding immigration of non-Goan labour from India to work in mines in 1950s led to Hindus eventually becoming the majority of people residing in Goa by the 1960 census carried out by the Portuguese.

The massive influx of non-Goan immigrants from other states of India since the Annexation of Goa has further increased the Hindu population resident in Goa. Traditions of ethnic Goan Hindus after 1961 include festivals with processions wherein the deities are taken from the newly built temples in the Novas Conquistas to their original sites in the Velhas Conquistas. In 2022, the Goa government announced plans for reconstruction of temples destroyed during the early colonial Portuguese regime.

While the Caste system in Goa is still a major factor among Goan Hindus, the egalitarian Indian constitution and the resulting affirmative action has helped to a perceived degree.

Goan Hindus celebrate the festival of Shiva and Shantadurga (Durga) besides those of other deities. The festival of Holi is called Shigmo in Goa and celebrated with gaiety. Chavath or Ganesh festival as it is called by Goan Hindus is a major festival in Goa. Deepavali is celebrated with the lighting of the deepastambhas in the temples and with the burning of effigies of Narakasura, who is regarded to have been vanquished on the day before Deepavali by Krishna.

The Goan Hindu community is composed of many castes, some of them are Brahmin, Konkan maratha, Kharvi, Bhandari (caste), Vaishya Vanis, Kunbis, Gaudas, etc.

== Demographics ==
The majority of residents are Hindu in both districts of Goa, with 76.06% of the total population of North Goa and 53.34% of South Goa.

== See also ==
- Villages and Agraharas in Goa and their ancient names
- Konkani Brahmins
- Caste in Goa
- Chikhal Kalo Mud Festival
