= Damodar Sansthaan =

Hindu temple in Goa

Shri Damodar Saunsthan
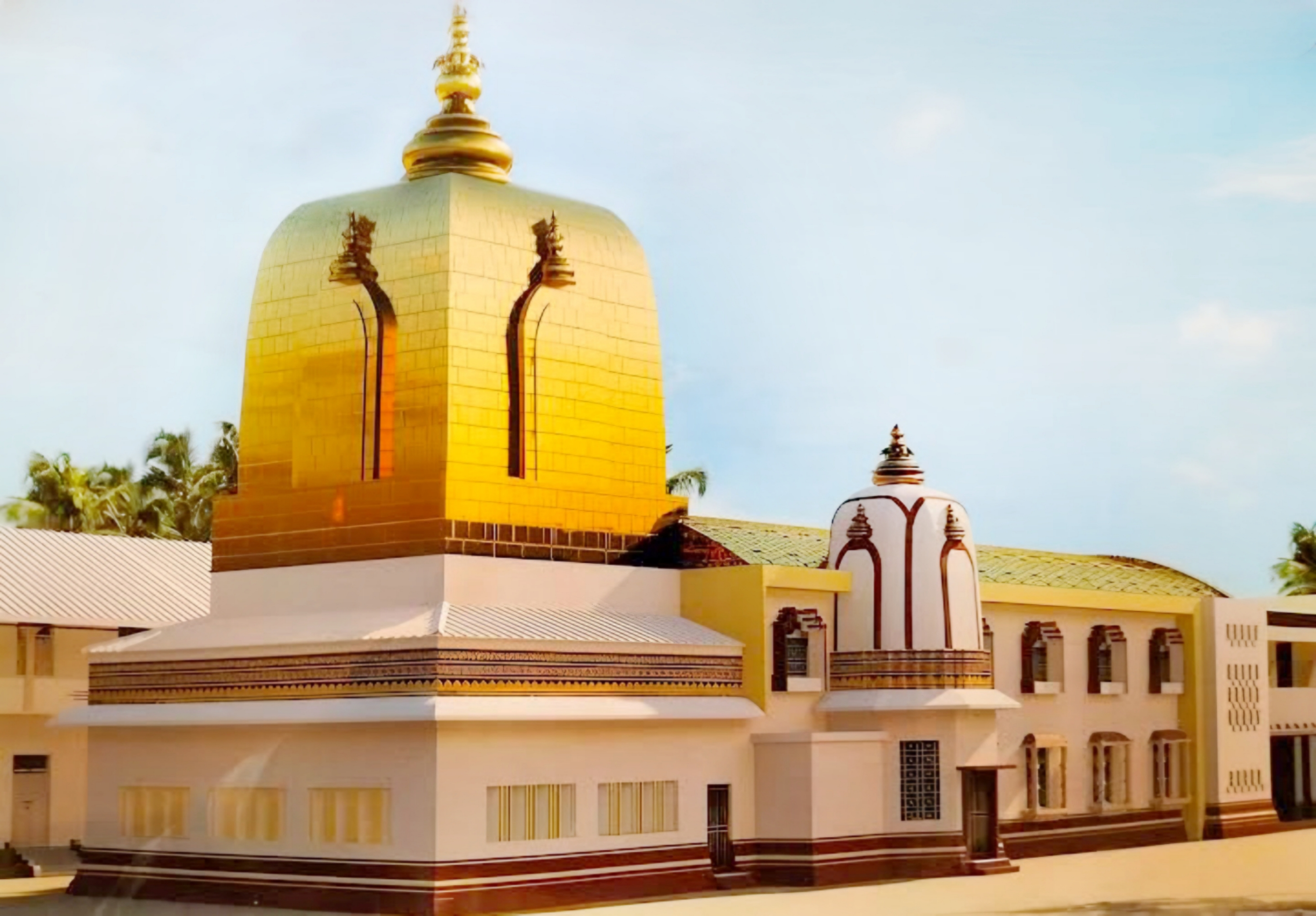
- The temple complex

- Location in Goa Damodar Sansthaan (India)

Religion
- Affiliation: Hinduism
- District: South Goa district
- Deity: Shiva (Damodar)
- Festivals: Rama Navami, Shivratri, Padwa (Hindu new year), Akshaya Tritiya, Anant Vritotsava, Navaratri, Dussera, Diwali, Magha Poornima Festival (Jatrotsav) and Mahashivratri
- Governing body: Shri Damodar Saunsthan

Location
- Location: Zambaulim, Quepem, Goa 403705
- State: Goa
- Country: India
- Interactive map of Shri Damodar Saunsthan
- Coordinates: 15.1866443°N 74.0948358°E

Shri Damodar Temple Zambaulim or Shri Damodara Sansthaan is a Hindu temple on the bank of the Kushawati River near the village of Zambaulim 22 km from the city of Margao on the border of Quepem region (Quepem taluk) in the south of Goa. The temple houses a celebrated murti, or image, of Shiva incarnated as Damodar.

== History ==
The deity was originally based in a temple in Mathagam, now Madgaon or Margao, where the Holy Spirit Church now stands. Due to the temple destruction campaign started by the Portuguese rulers in Sasashti Taluka in the year 1567, the Mahajans from Madgaon shifted the local deities (Ramnath, Damodar, Laxmi-Narayan, Chamundeshwari, Mahakali, Mahesh, etc.) to Zambaulim. The Desais of Rivona helped the Mahajans and gave them land for the construction of temples as well as Vatan which is being paid even today.

At the time of the Portuguese conquest, Margao was in a flourishing condition and contained many well constructed buildings, such as the Damodar temple. It is described by an old Portuguese chronicler as being so large and strongly built that the Muhammadans, when they invaded Salcete, occupied it as a good military post. According to a tradition, this temple was consecrated to the memory of a native of Margao, by name Makaji Damodar, who having met a tragic death on the spot with his newly married spouse received the honours of a god. There were besides nine other temples in the same village, all of which were destroyed by Diogo Rodrigues, captain of Rachol, who was rewarded with the revenues of the lands belonging to them. Christianity was introduced into Margao by the Jesuit Fathers about the year 1560; and in 1565 a church of Holy Ghost was erected there, on the ruins of the temple, at the desire of the first Archbishop, Dom Gaspar Jorge de Leão Pereira, the idol of Damodar being removed to Zambaulim.

== Description ==
Besides the murti of Damodar, revered by Hindus, Chamundeshwari (the fierce form of Shakti, a tutelary deity), Mahakali (the Hindu goddess of time and death, considered to be the consort of Shiva, the god of consciousness, and as the basis of reality and existence) and Mahesha (another incarnation of Shiva) are also honoured at this place.

The Damodar temple belongs to the GSB community (Gowda Saraswath Brahmins). Accommodation facilities are available in the temple complex for the community members.

== Observances ==
The main festival celebrated in Damodar Temple is Shigmo, the Goan Hindu spring festival of colours, which lasts for one week only. During the festival the Panair takes place and the folkloric show within which all participants exchange [[Gulal|gulal]]gulals (powders of different colours) with each other and organise various feasts and tablefuls.

The temple also celebrates Kartik Poornima, Ashwin Poornima, and Mahashivratri.

== Gallery ==
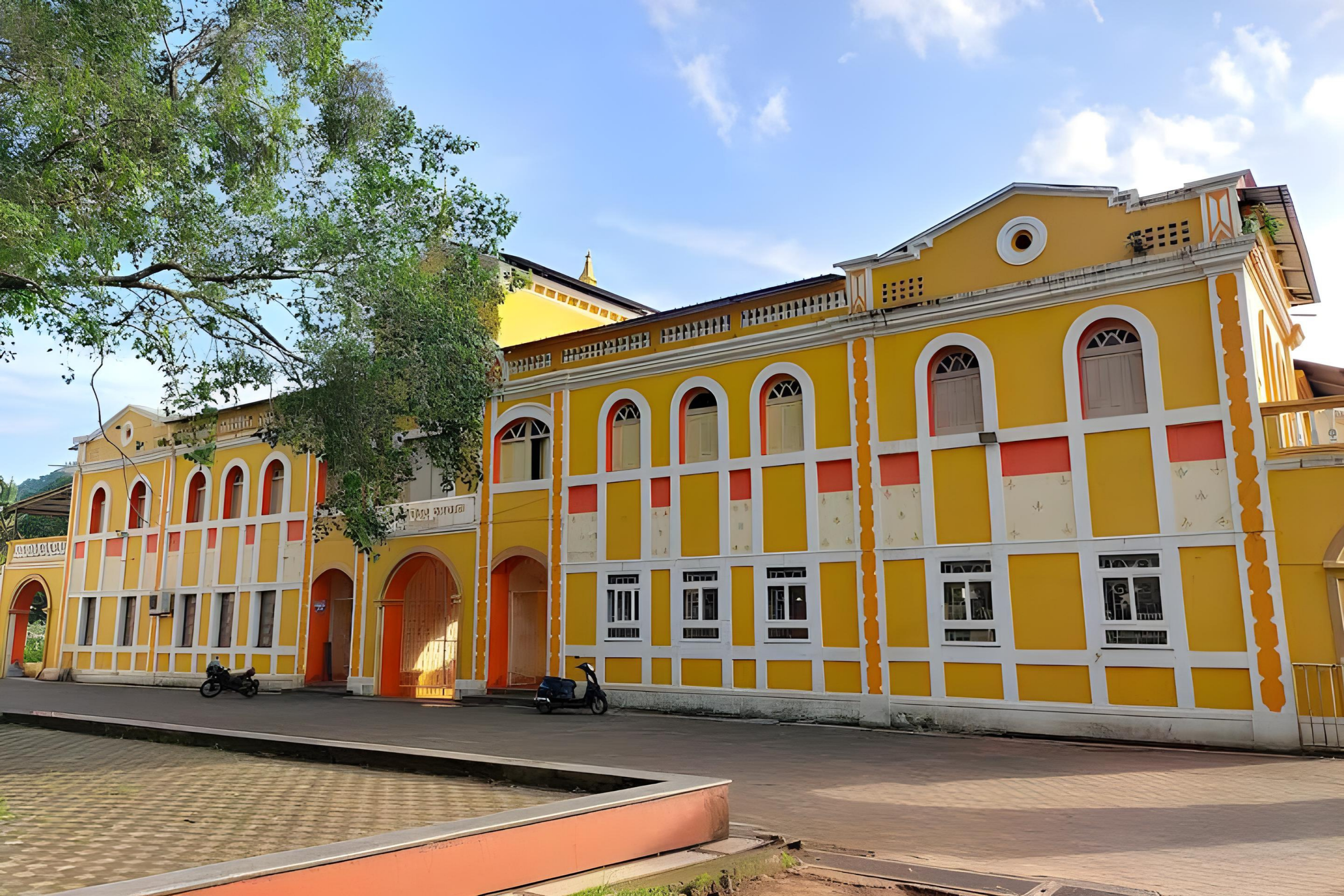
Entrance of the temple premises

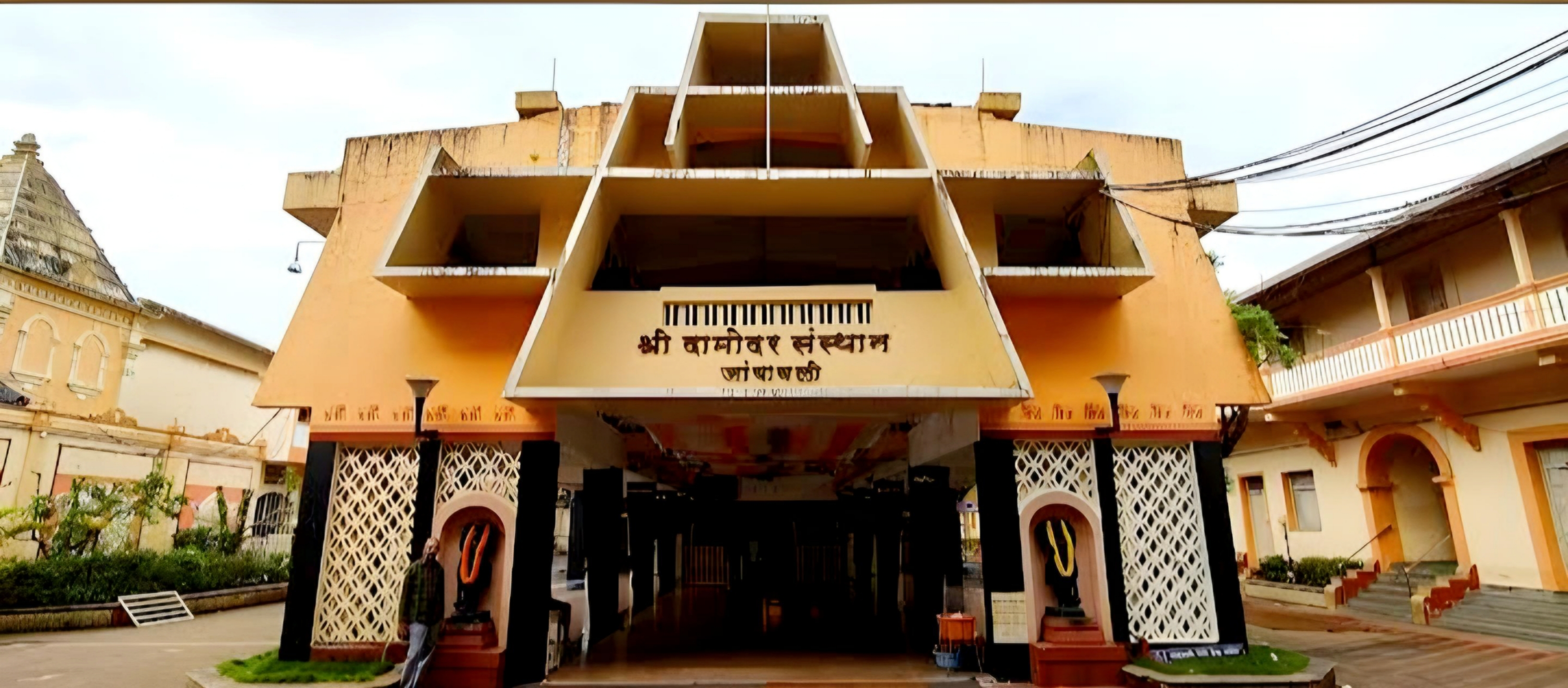
Front side view of the temple entrance

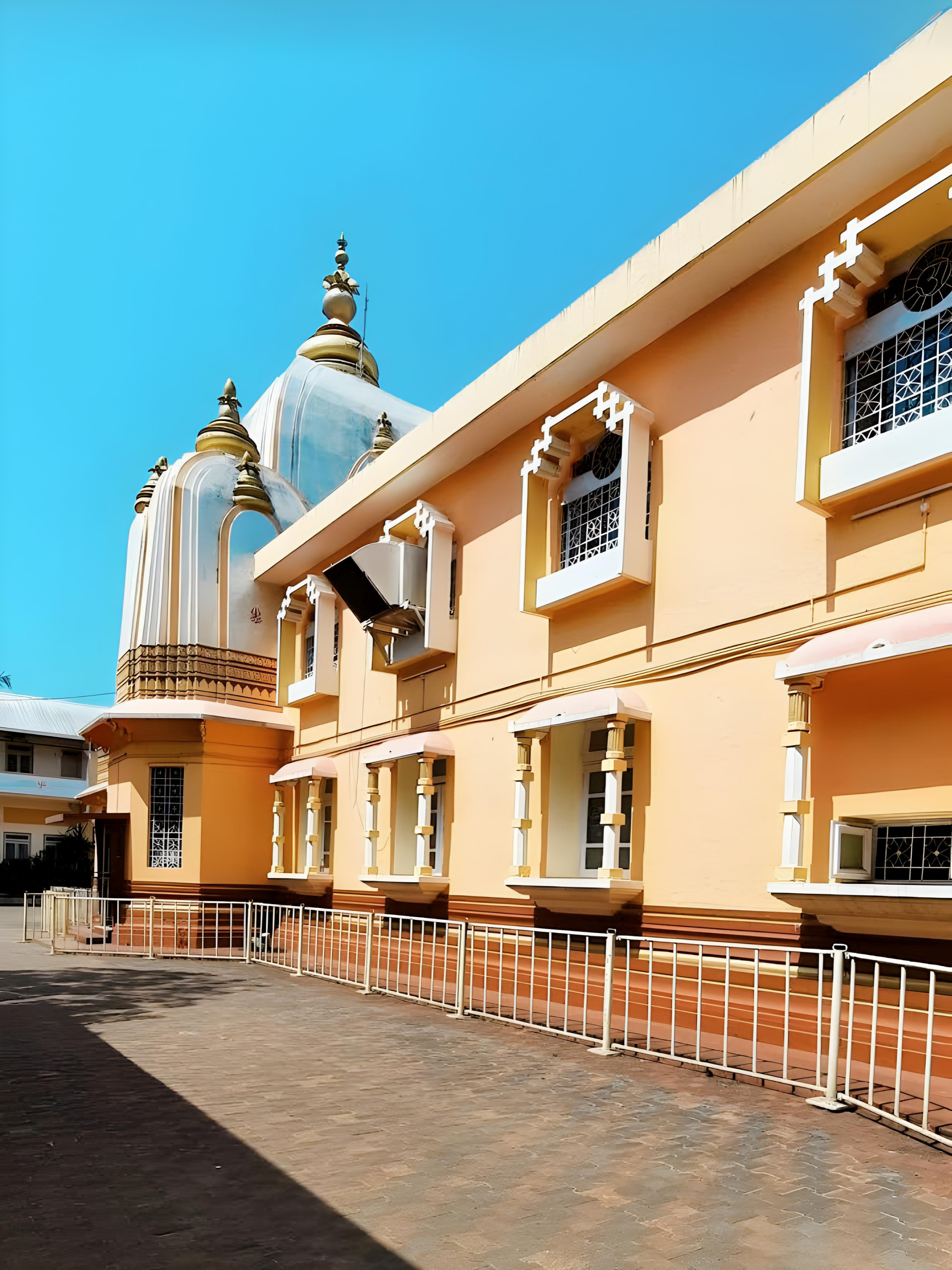
Side view of temple

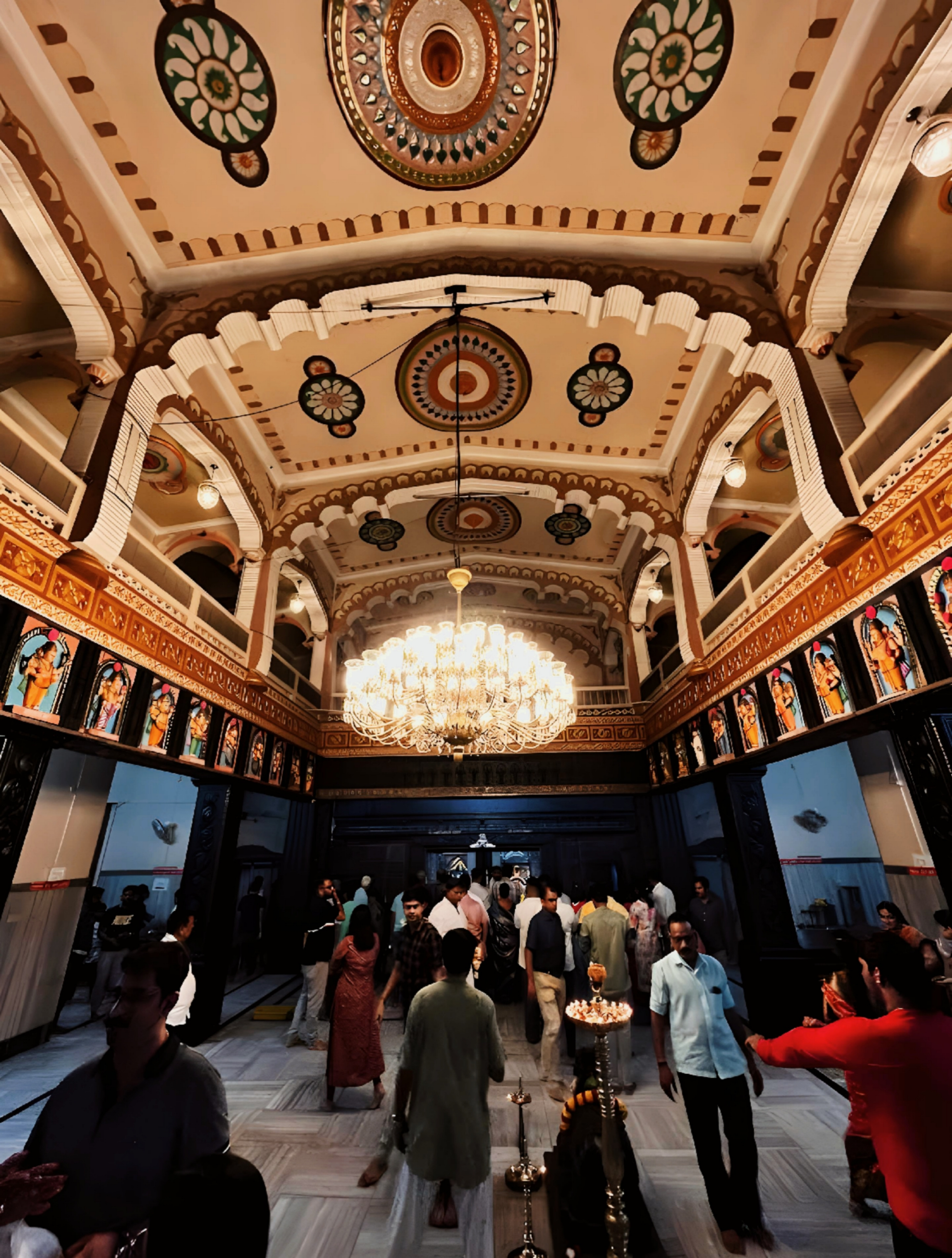
Interior of the temple

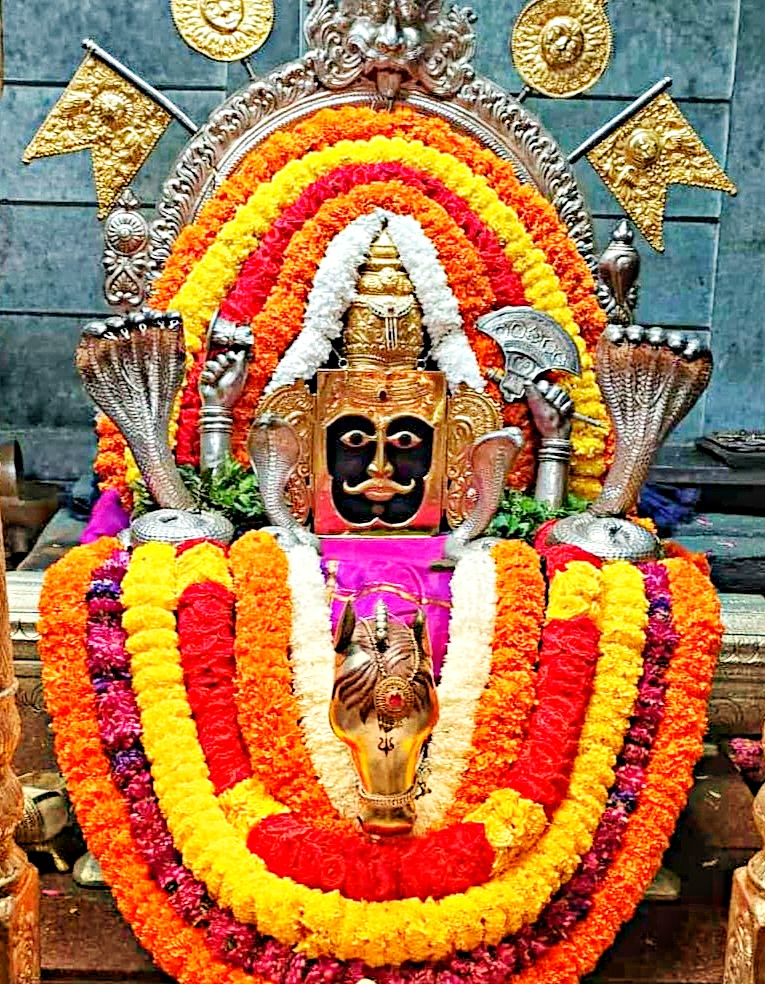
Lord Damodar
