= Gadyachi Jatra =

Hindu folk festival celebrated in Goa

- Also called: Gade Utsav
- Observed by: Goan Hindus
- Type: Religious, cultural, folk
- Date: Full moon day of Phālguna (Holi Pournima)

The Gadyachi Jatra (literally “Rally of the Gades”) is a traditional Indian spirit-invocation festival held during Shigmo in several Goan villages, notably Sal (Bicholim taluka) and Poinguinim (Canacona taluka). Men donning white dhotis—known as Gade—enter trance states as they invoke Devanchaar, the village protective spirit, through torchlit processions, ritual hide-and-seek in sacred groves, and offerings at cremation grounds.

== Rituals in Sal, Bicholim ==
On Holi Pūrṇimā night, a decorated mango trunk called the Holi is erected before the Mahadev Temple in the village Mand. Guided by rhythmic chanting and drumming, the Gades perform “Uzzvde” (torch-led hide-and-seek), venturing into nearby woods to recover sacred relics. Lost Gades are ritually revived with consecrated water before the three-night festival concludes with offerings at the cremation ground.

== Triennial Betal Temple Jatra in Poinguinim ==
Every three years at Shri Betal Temple, a cloth manuscript dated 1823 AD is read aloud. A platform of areca-nut trunks supports four Gades who are suspended by hooks on a rotating wheel, symbolizing Devanchaar’s power and the community’s ancestral bond.

== Community significance ==
The festival draws thousands of villagers, devotees, and cultural tourists from Goa, Maharashtra, and Karnataka. Participants believe the rites protect fields, livestock, and households from malevolent forces. Panchayats and the Department of Tourism, Government of Goa, promote Gadyachi Jatra through guided cultural programmes.

== See also ==
- Shigmo
- Dola Purnima
- Hinduism in Goa
