= Betal =

Hindu folk god

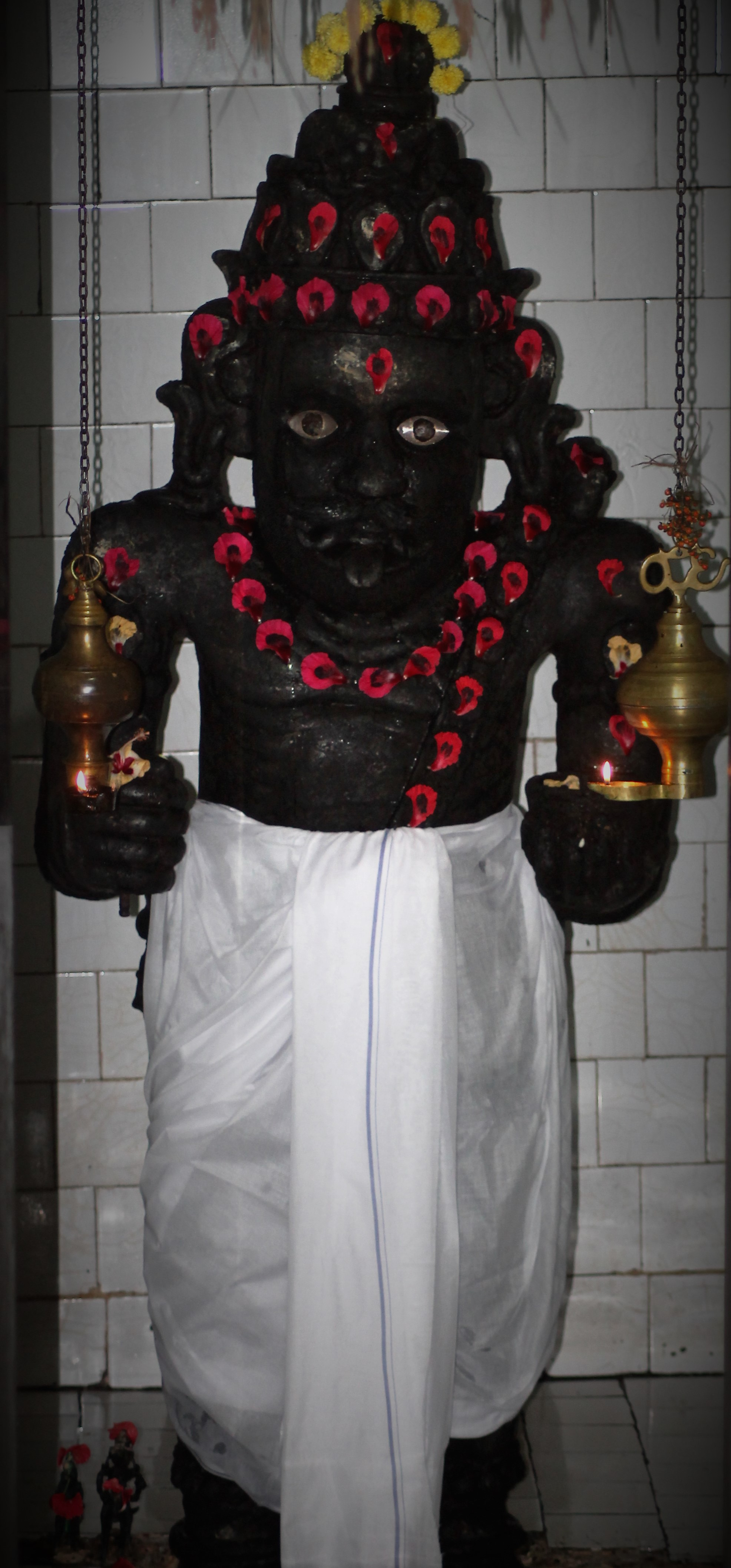
Betal statue, Poinguinim, Goa

Betal, Vetal (Konkani: वेताळ), (Marathi: वेताळ) or Vetoba, a Bhairava form of Shiva is a popular god in Goa, Sindhudurg district & Kolhapur of Maharashtra and Karwar of Karnataka in India. Betal is also known as Vetoba in the Konkan area of Maharashtra and Goa, and in the Sindhudurg district.

Vetoba is a deity of the Shaivites, and also known as Agyavetal, Pralayvetal and Iwalavetal. He holds a sword and a skull bowl.

== History ==
Betal was a deity of the people of the Konkan. The name Betala is derived from the word Vetala. Betal is a grāmadevatā, a protector deity of the local community.

Vetāla is one of the most famous and popular divine or semi-divine beings. Almost everyone recognizes him from the Vetāla-pañcaviṃśatī (Vikrama-Vetāla) stories. In Maharashtra, especially in the coastal Konkan region, Vetāla is more popular as the folk deity Vetobā. His nature, appearance, and roles highlight that he is a kshetrapāla or protector deity.

In the Puranas, he is treated as a Śivagaṇa. They associate him with Bhairava, another Śivagaṇa, who is often glorified as an incarnation of Shiva. Bhairava is also worshipped as Bhairobā or Bhairī in the Konkan.

=== Scholarly and folk origins ===
According to historian V. R. Mitragotri, Vetala or Vetoba was a “deity of the masses” in pre-Portuguese Goa, worshipped in small shrines with thatched roofs rather than in formal temples. His image was described as nude, fierce, and larger than life, holding a sword (khadga) and a bowl (patra). Mitragotri notes that Vetala cults rarely appear in royal inscriptions because they belonged to the folk sphere, but were nevertheless central to village religion in the Konkan region.

Prabhushastri identifies Betal or Vetoba as both a Grāmadevatā (village guardian deity) and a Śaiva gaṇa of Shiva. He distinguishes two ritual forms—Ugra Betal, to whom liquor and animal offerings were once made, and Saumya Betal, offered betel leaves, clothing, and sandals. His study records forty-nine Betal shrines in Goa, of which nineteen were destroyed during Portuguese rule, and describes the twelfth-century Nagdo Betal sculpture at Loliem as one of the oldest surviving icons. At Torxem in Pernem, the same deity is worshipped under the name Vetoba, confirming the continuity between the Goan Betal and the Maharashtrian Vetoba.

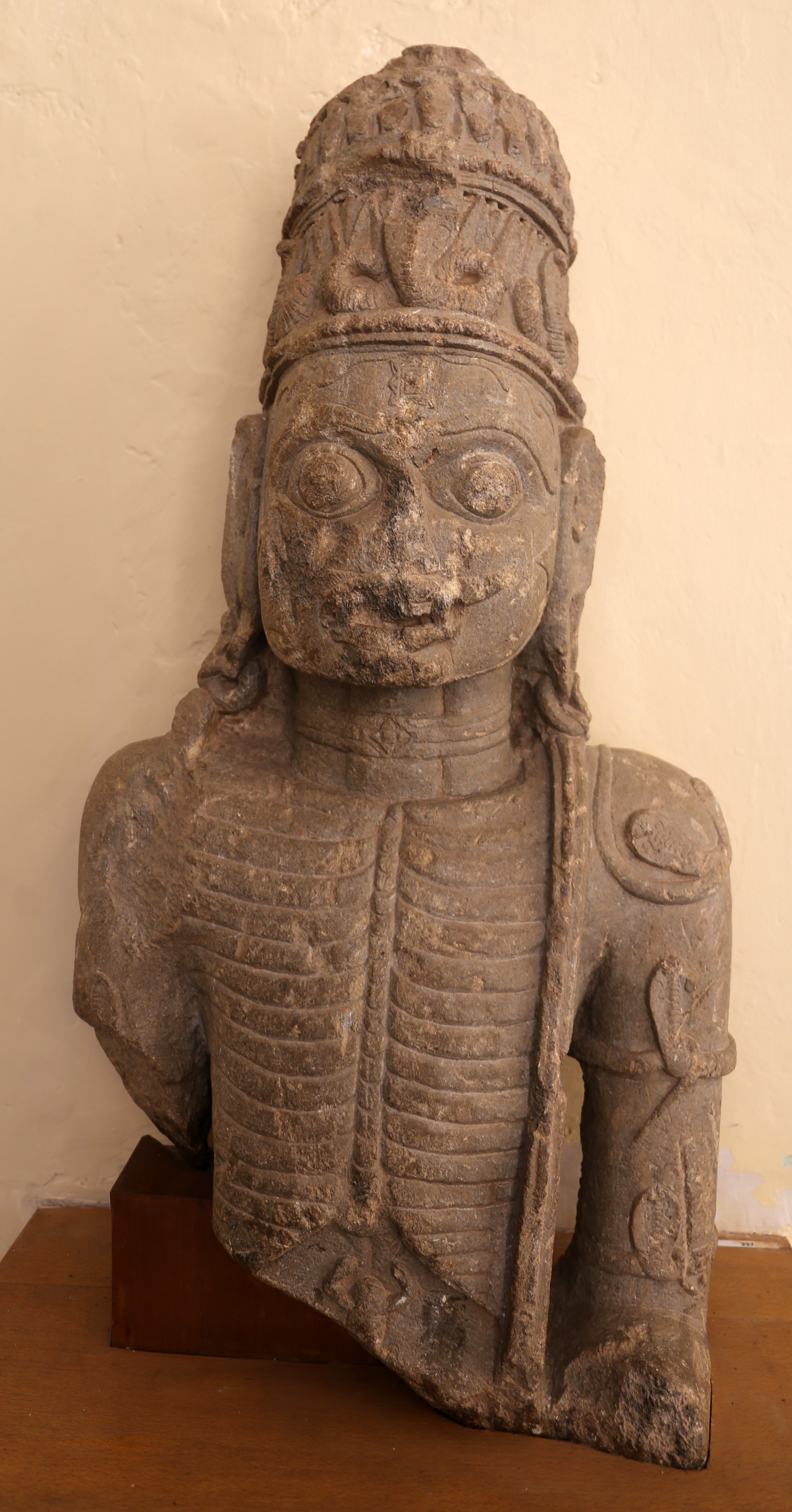
A statue of Betal, from the Collections of the Archaeological Museum and Portrait Gallery (Old Goa)

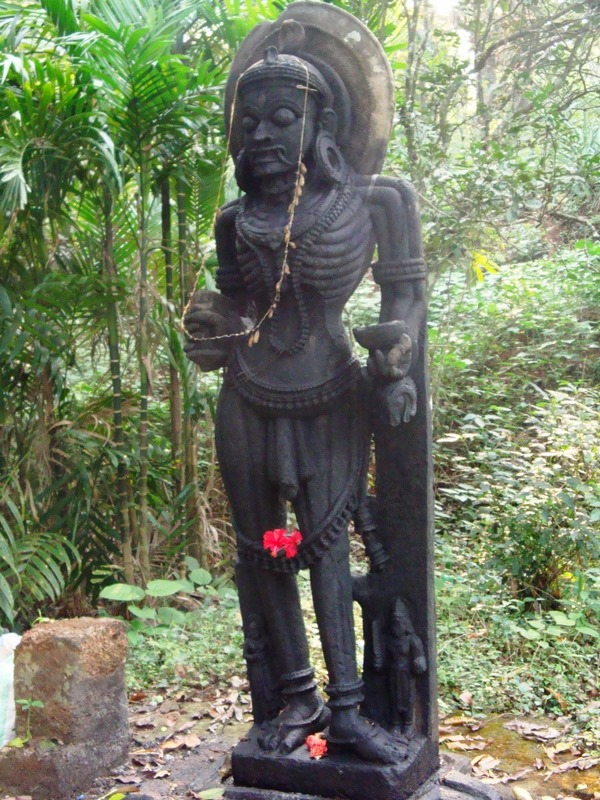
The Lord Betal Statue at Loliem

Scholarly interpretations of Goan folklore view Nagdo Betal as the male counterpart of the earth-goddess Santer, representing fertility and protection. Mabel Cynthia Mascarenhas notes that this rural guardian spirit was later assimilated into the Shaiva pantheon, his nude form symbolically merged with the liṅga of Shiva.

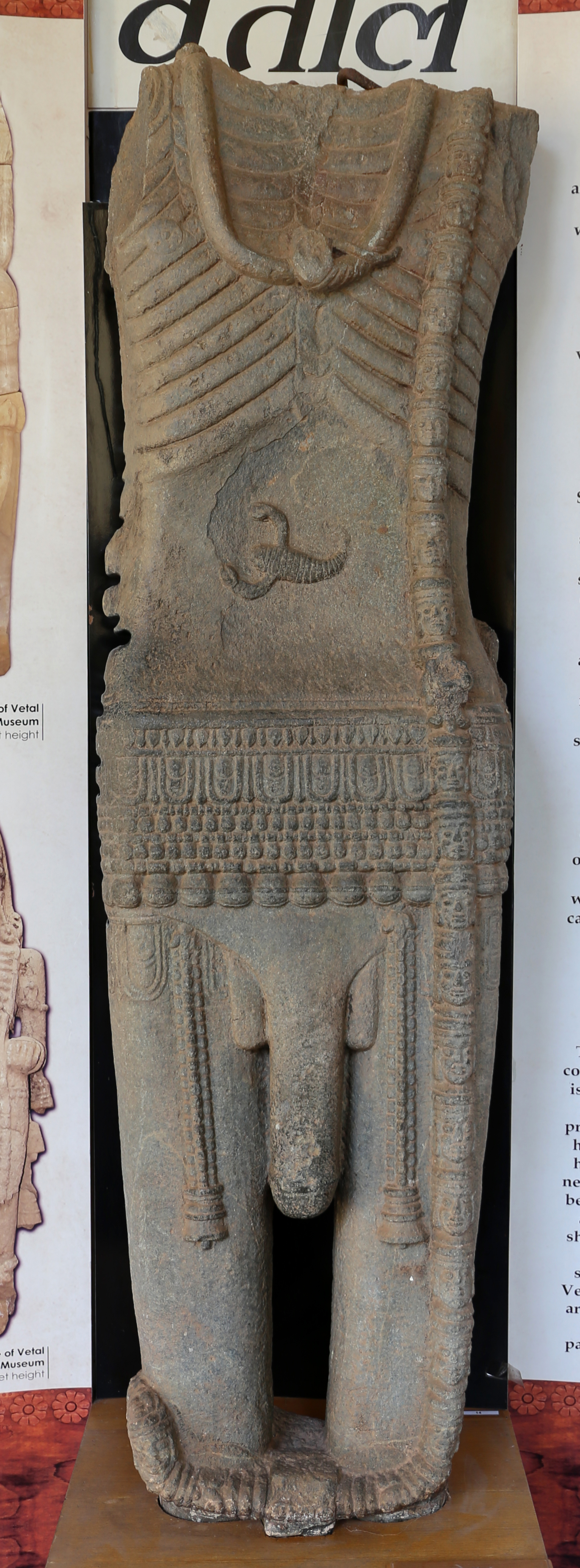
A beheaded statue of Betal from South Goa due to the Goa Inquisition, now in the Collections of the Archaeological Museum and Portrait Gallery (Old Goa)

== Legends ==
Śivapurāṇa (III.21) and Kālikāpurāṇa (Chap.47 onwards) narrate interesting stories of association of Bhairava and Vetāla. As per Śivapurāṇa, once Śiva and Pārvatī were enjoying amorous sports and had appointed Bhairava as the doorman to ensure privacy.

When Pārvatī came out of the room in a dishevelled state, Bhairava happened to look at her ‘like a woman’. He obstructed her from going out, smitten with her charm. This infuriated her and she cursed him to be born as a human[1].

Therefore, Bhairava was born as Vetāla. However, after knowing about this, Śiva did not get furious or curse him any further. Instead, he consoled Bhairava in many ways. After Bhairava was born on the earth as Vetāla, Śiva out of affection for Bhairava took the form of Maheśa and Pārvatī was born as Śāradā[2].

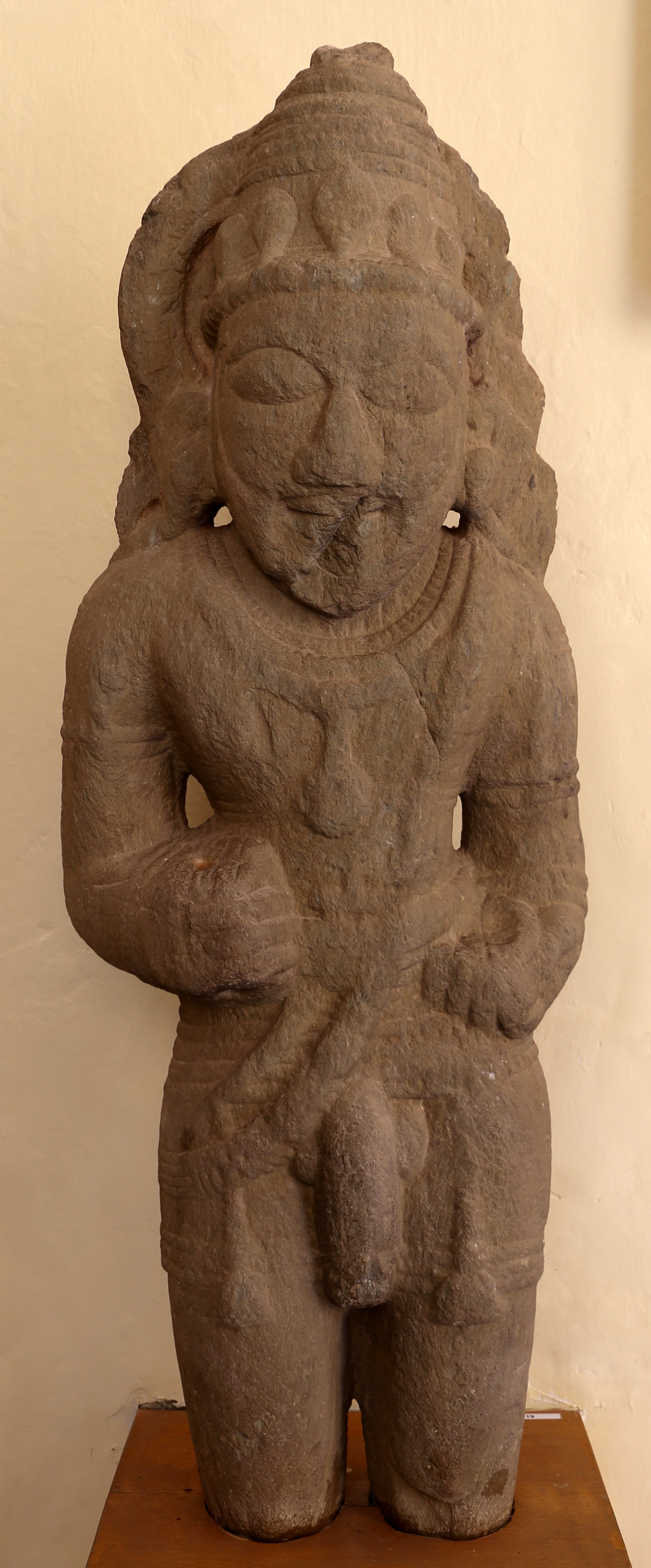
Vetal, a 12th-century sculpture carved in chlorite schist from Revora, Bardez, Goa; now housed in the Collections of the Archaeological Museum and Portrait Gallery, Old Goa.

Kālikāpurāṇa extends this story further by adding multiple layers to it. Bhairava is said to be human form of Mahākāla, while Vetāla is the human form of Bhṛṅgī. [3] Mahākāla and Bhṛṅgī, the sons of Hara, were born from two drops of his spilled semen. They were dark black in colour, hence named so. They were appointed as the gatemen by Śiva and Pārvatī, while the couple enjoyed in their bedroom.

When Pārvatī exited the room in a tousled state, they happened to see her. She cursed them for having seen her in a state only fit for her husband to see. She cursed them to be born as humans with monkey faces[4].

Instead of calmly accepting the unjust curse, they hurled a counter-curse; as they were actually innocent, and were diligently doing their assigned duty. It was her fault to walk out of the bedroom in an inappropriate state. She was also to be born as a human, and Hara as her husband. The duo, Mahākāla and Bhṛṅgī was then to be born to them.

Accordingly Pārvatī was born to King Kakutstha and his wife Queen Manonmathinī as Princess Tārāvatī. She was married to Prince Candraśekhara, son of King Pauṣya. Candraśekhara was actually Śiva himself, born to the issueless King through a boon.

Once, when Queen Tārāvatī was bathing in a river, a certain Sage Kapota was enchanted by her beauty, and sought coitus with her. The Queen, afraid of losing her virtue, sent her sister Citrāṅgadā in her stead. This continued for a while. Upon realizing the fraud, the sage cursed her.

As per the curse, a hideous looking, ill-dressed, penniless, and skull-bearing man would forcibly mate with her, resulting in the birth of two monkey-faced sons.

She was furious with such a curse, and vowed that if she was the daughter of Kakutstha, born with the blessings of goddess Caṇḍikā, and was devoted to her husband Candraśekhara, no one apart from her own husband would be able to mate with her.

After she told her husband about the entire episode, he built a secluded tower for her to stay. Once, Śiva and Pārvatī were passing by the tower by air, and spotted her. Realizing this as a befitting opportunity to fulfil all the curses, Śiva instructed Pārvatī to enter the body of Tārāvatī, while he assumed the form of a man, just as was described by the curse of Sage Kapota[5]. Through their union were born two monkey-faced sons.

Later Sage Nārada informed the King about the birth of two princes, and explained their real nature. King then realized his Śivatva and the queen’s Pārvatītva. The kids were named Bhairava and Vetāla.

King later had three more sons with her. He bestowed the kingdom, all the riches, and his love on them; and was rather fearful of Bhairava and Vetāla. They became celibates and wandered about in the forest. In a chance meeting, Sage Kapota explained to them that they actually were the sons of Śiva and Pārvatī.

He sent them to Kāmarūpa to meet their parents. They propitiated Śiva who explained the method of veneration of various forms of Pārvatī. They worshipped her accordingly, and were blessed with permanent servitude to the divine couple, immortality, and divinity. Śiva conferred upon them gaṇeśatva.

The text also goes on to explain their progeny. They were celibates and never married. However, they decided to have sons after a counsel with Sage Nārada, who explained to them the need to have a male offspring[6]. Bhairava was attracted to the divine nymph Urvaśī and produced a son named Suveśa. Vetāla fathered a son named Śṛṅga with Kāmadhenu. These lineages continued to flourish.

== Tradition ==
According to tradition, Betal moves throughout the village at night and keeps vigil over the property of his devotees. The cult of Betal has been prominent in Goa; animal sacrifices were historically offered in many places, though such practices are now disapproved of in some regions. Offerings of sugar, bananas, or sandals are also common.

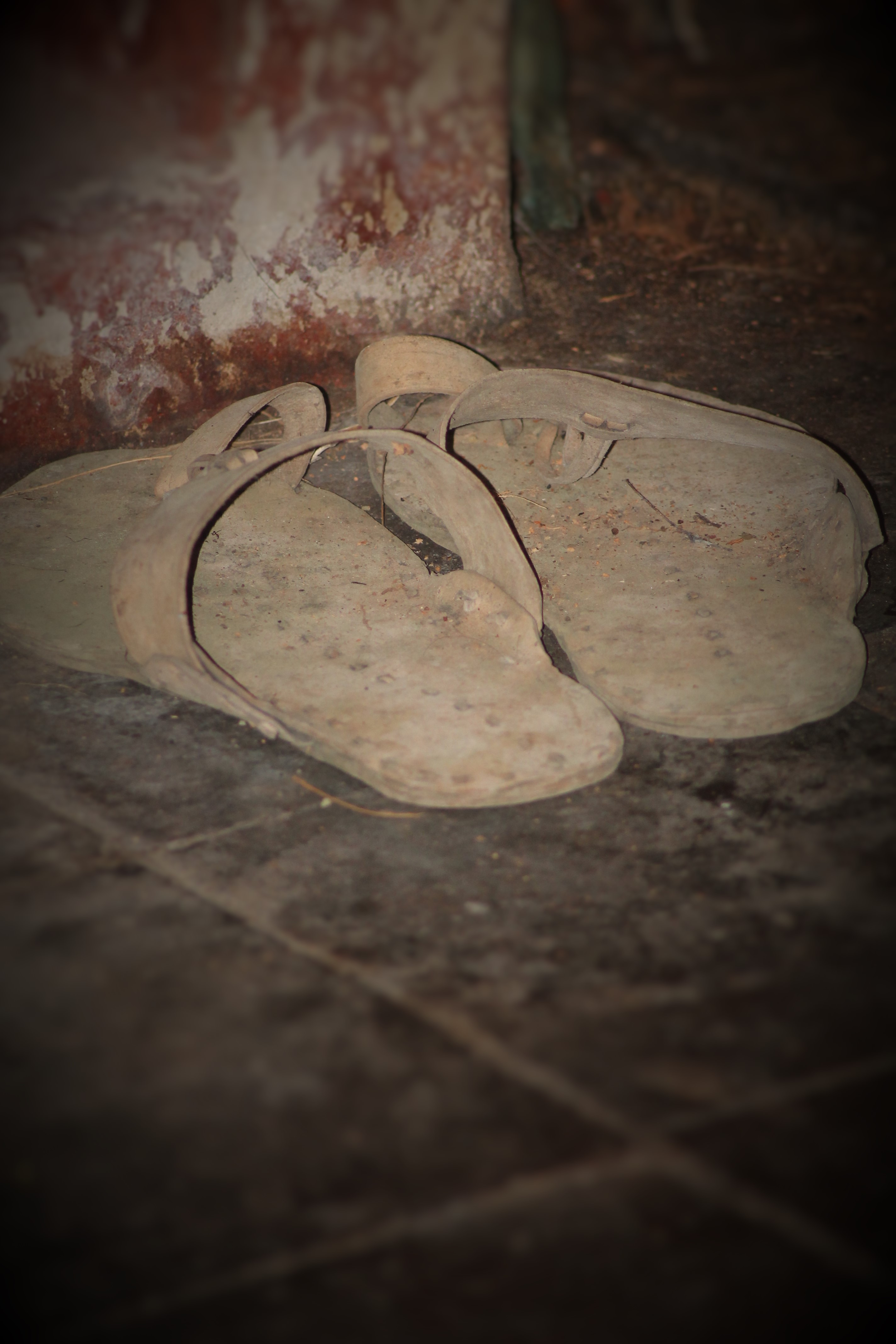
Betal chappals at Poinguinim, Goa

In the Konkan Daiva tradition, Vetoba is regarded as a Kshetrapāla Daiva—a protective spirit who guards the village boundaries and mediates between humans and higher deities. He is often paired with Bhutnath, another attendant of Shiva, and collectively addressed as Bhairav gaṇas.

Agyo Betal is another form of Betal found in Goa.

In Poinguinim, Goa, when wishes are fulfilled, devotees offer leather chappals to the deity. It is believed that Betal wears these chappals and roams around the village, symbolizing his nightly patrols. Scholars note that this ritual expresses Vetoba’s role as “the god who walks the village at night,” a continuation of his function as guardian of the settlement. Temples are also present in Amona, Pune, Aaravali, Uttarkhand and Kashmir.

=== Legend ===
According to later Nāth tradition and Marathi devotional literature such as the Navnath Bhaktisār Granth, Matsyendranath (Machhindranath) is said to have engaged in a contest with Vetoba (Vetal), the ruler of ghosts and spirits. The text recounts that Vetoba commanded an army of bhūtas and pretas that spread chaos across the land. Using his yogic siddhis and mantra power, Matsyendra subdued Vetoba and brought his spectral host under control. After his defeat, Vetoba was placed under the command of Shiva and transformed into a guardian deity (Kshetrapāla Daiva) who protects devotees and watches over villages at night.

== See also ==
- Ravalnath
- Folk Hinduism

== Bibliography ==
Vetoba Devasthan of Aravali
