= Zambaulim =

- village
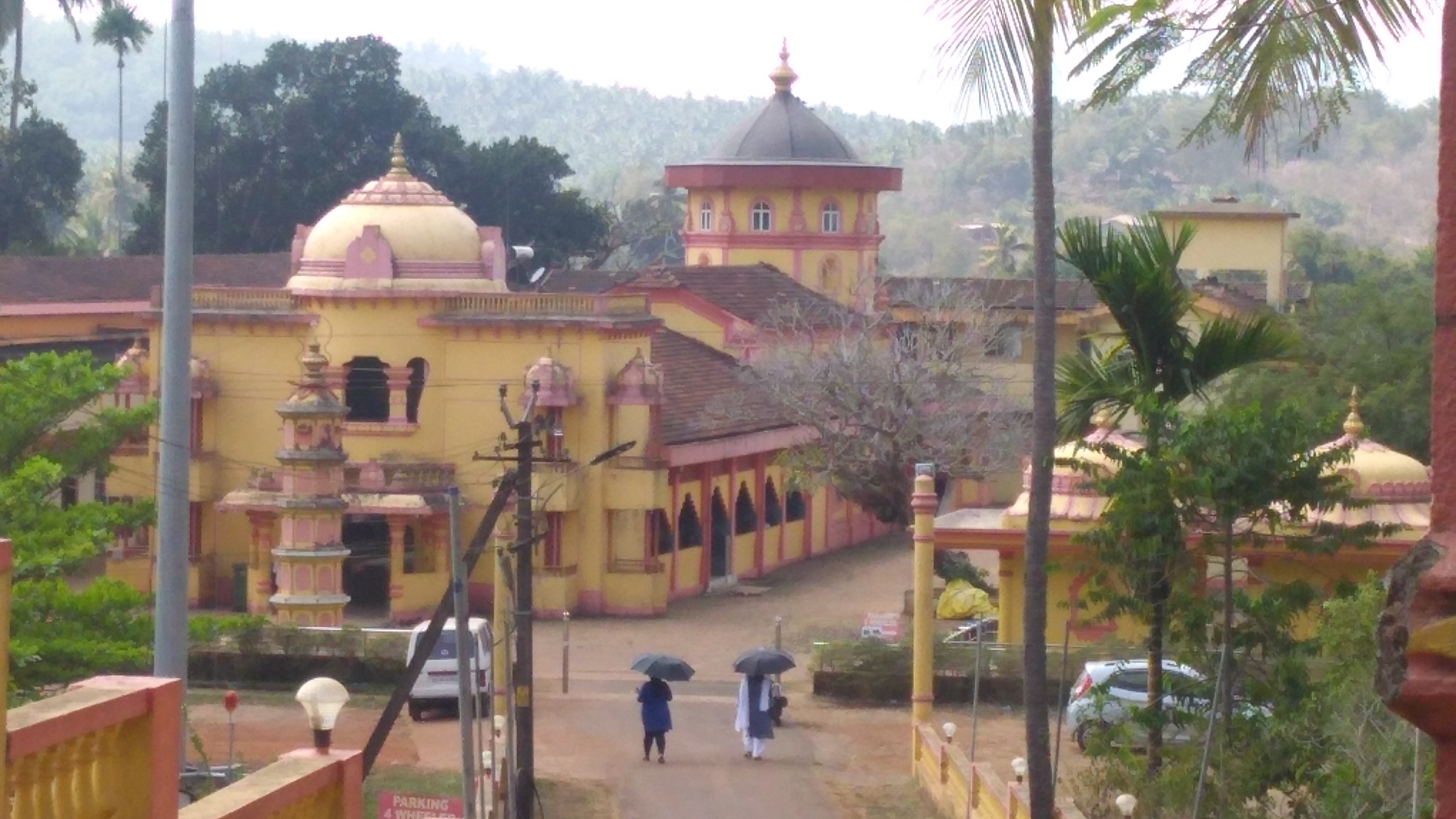

- Location in Goa, India Zambaulim (India)
- Coordinates: 15°11′0″N 74°6′0″E
- Country: India
- State: Goa
- District: South Goa
- Elevation: 39 m (128 ft)

Languages
  - Official: Konkani
- Time zone: UTC+5:30 (IST)
- Vehicle registration: GA
- Coastline: 0 kilometres (0 mi)
- Website: goa.gov.in

Zambaulim is a village in South Goa, Goa.

In the 1800s, it was the regional capital for the colonial Provincias de Zamboulim (also called Panchemal), which was formed by merger of 5 surrounding districts of:

- Embarbacem,
- Chandrovadi,
- Balli,
- Astagrar,
- Cacora

== Geography ==
It is located at an elevation of 39 m above MSL.

== Location ==
Nearest railway station is at Margao.

== Places of interest ==
- Shri Damodar Temple
