= Yaga-shala =

Sacrificial hall in Hinduism

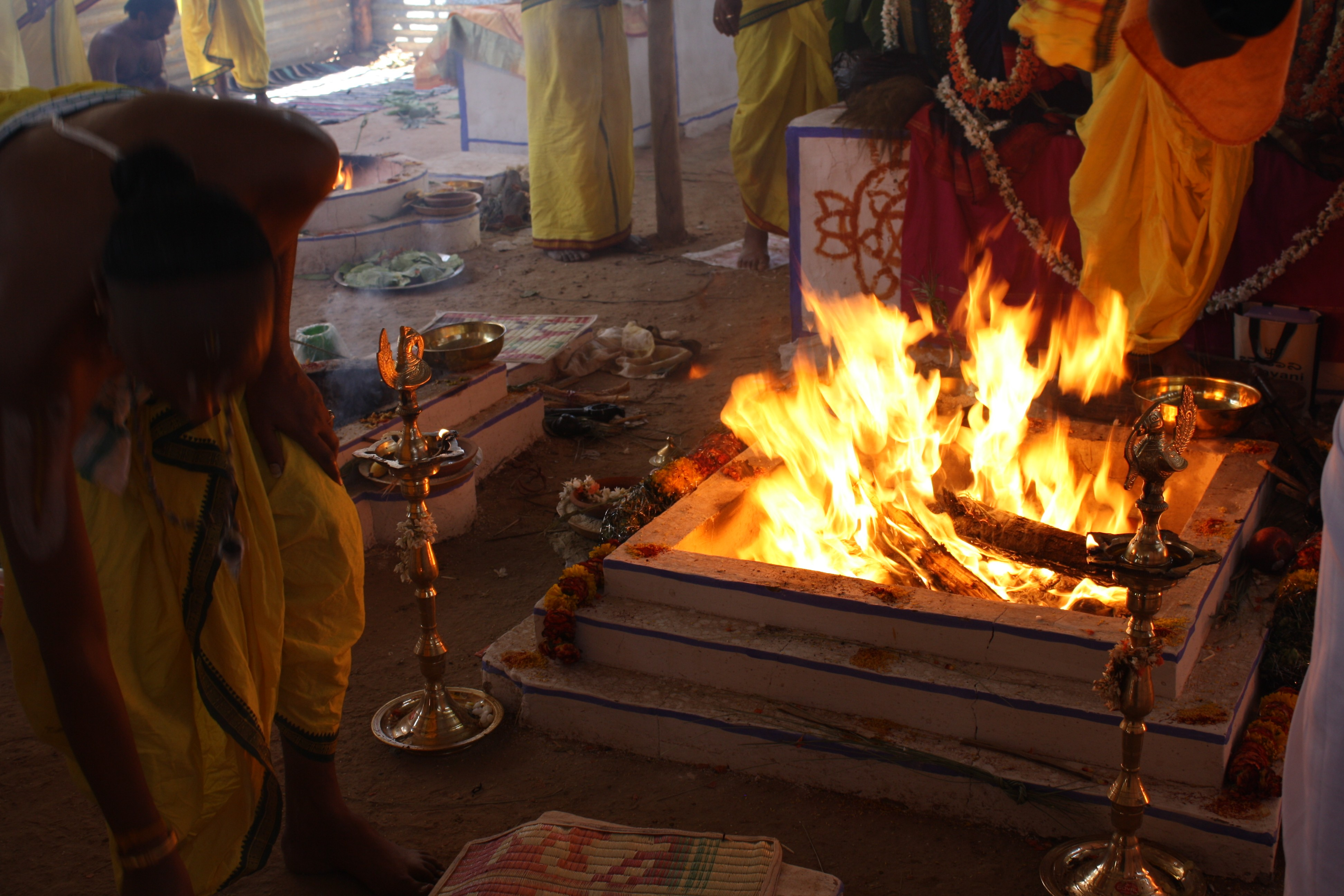
A Vaishnava temple ritual performed at a yaga-shala

Yaga-shala (Sanskrit: यागशाल, romanized: Yāga-śālā; Hindustani pronunciation: [ˈjaːɡə ˈʃaːlə]) is a sacrificial hall in Hinduism where a fire sacrifice (yajna) is conducted. It also refers to the site of the sacrifice during the kumbhabhishekam ceremony of a temple. The various characteristics and the specifications related to the construction of a yaga-shala are described in the Shulba Sutras.
