= Karle, Belgaum =

Village in Karnataka, India

Coordinates: 15°46′30″N 74°24′56″E

- Village
- Interactive map of Karle, Belgaum
- Country: India
- State: Karnataka
- District: Belgaum

Population (2015)
  - Total: 1,496

Karle is a village in Belgaum district, a district in Karnataka, India. As of 2015, the village had 1,496 residents.
