= Kasarpal =

- town
- Location in Goa, India Kasarpal (India)
- Coordinates: 15°38′57″N 73°56′5″E
- Country: India
- State: Goa
- District: North Goa
- Block: Bicholim
- Panchayat: Latambarcem

Languages
  - Official: Konkani
- Time zone: UTC+5:30 (IST)
- Vehicle registration: GA
- Nearest city: Mapusa
- Website: goa.gov.in

Kasarpal is a town in the Bicholim region of Goa, which is in the North Goa district. It is about 14 km from the town of Mapusa.

The original name of the village is mentioned as Pallika in a Copper-plate inscription dated 1436 AD, which is in the possession of the Archaeology department of Goa. The name of the village is said to have derived from Sanskrit Kasara which means a pond, and Pallika meaning a village. Alternatively, it is also possible that the village was known as Kasarpal because it was a village where trade of coppersmiths once flourished. The village was later gifted to a certain Shreshthi (head of a trade guild) by a Brahmin minister named Nagadeva. Kasarpal is the site of the 800-year-old Shri Kalikadevi Temple. The village also houses shrines dedicated to Mahadev and Bhumika.
