= Madhav Govind Rameshwar Temple =

Temple in Ponda taluk, Goa State, India

Coordinates: 15.388504895°N 73.964540364°E

The Madhav, Govind, Rameshwar Temple is located at Agapur (Agasthipur) village, in Ponda taluk, Goa State, India. It is Trikutachala shrine, and the Temple is devoted to the Vaishnavite deities Madhav (Krishna), Rameshwar and Shaiv deity Rameshwar.
