= Goan temple =

Hindu temples in Goa

A Goan temple is known as a dēvūḷ (देवूळ) or sansthān (संस्थान) in the Konkani language. These temples were once the centres of villages, cities, and all the other social, cultural and economic gatherings in Goa. These were known as grāmasansthās (ग्रामसंस्था) in Konkani.

== History ==
A temple in Goa was once always the centre of a village (and in cases still is), and the lives of people were related to these temples and their festivals. The village property was divided amongst the villagers according to certain rules. The patrons of the temples are known as Mahajana and for the most part hail from Brahmin communities with a few from Kshatriya communities. This Mahajani system was once responsible for temple upkeep.

== Deities ==
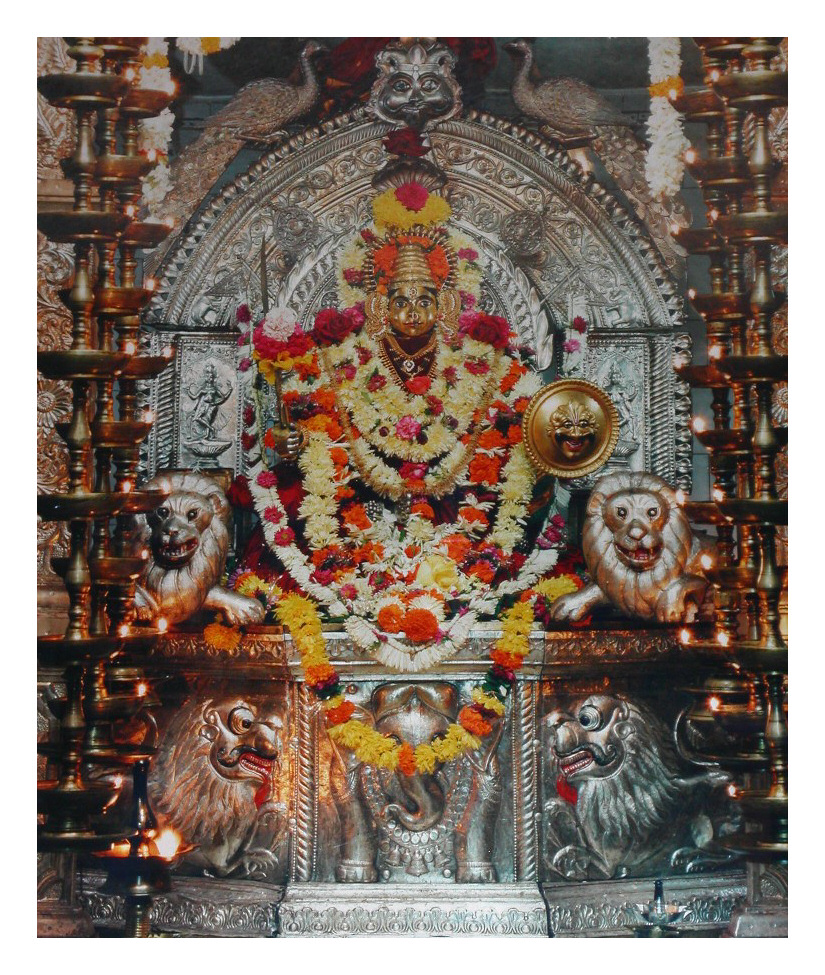
Murti of Kamakshidevi, Shri Kamakshi Saunsthan, Shiroda in the Garbhagruha

Goan temples are strictly devoted to the worship of Panchyatan devised by Adi Shankara. The following sholka says :

आदित्यं गणनाथंच देविम् रुद्रं च केशवं | पंच देवताम् इत्युक्तं सर्ववर्मसु पुजयेत् ||

The following deities constitute a Panchayatana:

- Devi ( e.g. Shantadurga, Bhagavati, Navadurga, Mahalakshmi, etc. )
- Rudra or Ishwara ( e.g.Manguesh, Nagesh, Shivnath, Damodar, Gananatha )
- Ganesh ( e.g. Mahaganapati )
- Keshava ( e.g. Lakshmi Narayana )
- Aaditya ( e.g. Surya Narayana )

In addition to these deities following deities are also worshipped.

- Kulpurush - Family Ancestor
- Ravalnath
- Bhutnath
- Gram Purush
- Kshetrapal

== Temple deity types ==
A Goan Konkani temple contains two murtis, one is a Mula Murti to which the alankar (adornment) is usually done and which is of ancient origin and the Utsava Murti which is displayed in the temple premises. The Utsava murtis are made of silver, gold or sometimes alloys. An alloy Prasad Murti is also seen.

== Temple Related roles ==
- Mahajans
- Kulavis
- Pujari
- Abhisheki (Purohits)
- Puranik
- Haridas
- Devdasi (Bhavin, Kalavant)(see: Gomantak Maratha Samaj)
- Vajantri
- Mest
- Karbhari
- Bhajak
- Mahale

== Architecture ==
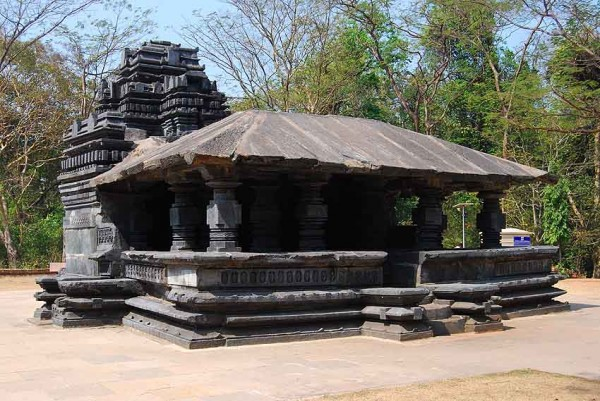
An ancient Goan Temple - Mahadev Tambdi Surla

=== Artisans ===
Most of the original temples in Goa were demolished by the Muslim and Portuguese rulers, and the artisan castes in the Velhas Conquistas, responsible for temple construction, converted to Christianity during Portuguese rule.

The few unconverted Hindu Brahmin families in the Velhas Conquistas emigrated to other places with the deity idols, and new temples were built to house these idols. The present day Goan temples are of Nagara architecture with some alterations.

=== Materials used ===
The pre-Islamic ancient temples were made of sedimentary rocks, stones, wood, and limestone. Black stone temples built in the Kadamba and Hemadpanti styles are very rare. Only one ancient temple of Goa exists today in its original style, namely the Mahadev Temple.

The temples are usually painted in white or other light colours, and usually are covered with clay tiles. A Golden Kalasha is also seen.

=== Main elements of Temple ===
The salient parts of the Goan temple are:

- Sabhamandapa
- Antarala
- Chowk: The Chowk pillars are usually wooden with explicit carvings. The roof is also studded with paintings and chandeliers. Huge bells are hung at the entrance of the Chowk. This place is considered very sacred.
- Garbhagruha (Garbhakud in Konkani): The Garbhagruha is usually studded with silver and main idol is made of black stone and sometimes Shaligrama.
- Sarvalli (Pradakshina marga)
- Tali or a Tallay: A water tank that is usually seen at the main entrance of the temple.
- A large Praveshdwar or the main entrance,
- Deepa stambha is an integral part of the temple.

The temples have wooden carvings depicting epics like Ramayana and Mahabharata. A Nagar Khana is a very distinct feature of Goan temples.

=== Other Temple related structures ===
Other buildings related with the temple are:

- Agrashala
- Bhojanshala
- Yagnya-shala: A sacrificial hall where a Hindu yagna or fire sacrifice is conducted.
- Vahanshala - The place where the Vahanas (mounts) of the deity are kept. These are used for ceremonial purposes on festival days.
- Nagarkhana
- Related offices

== Festivals ==
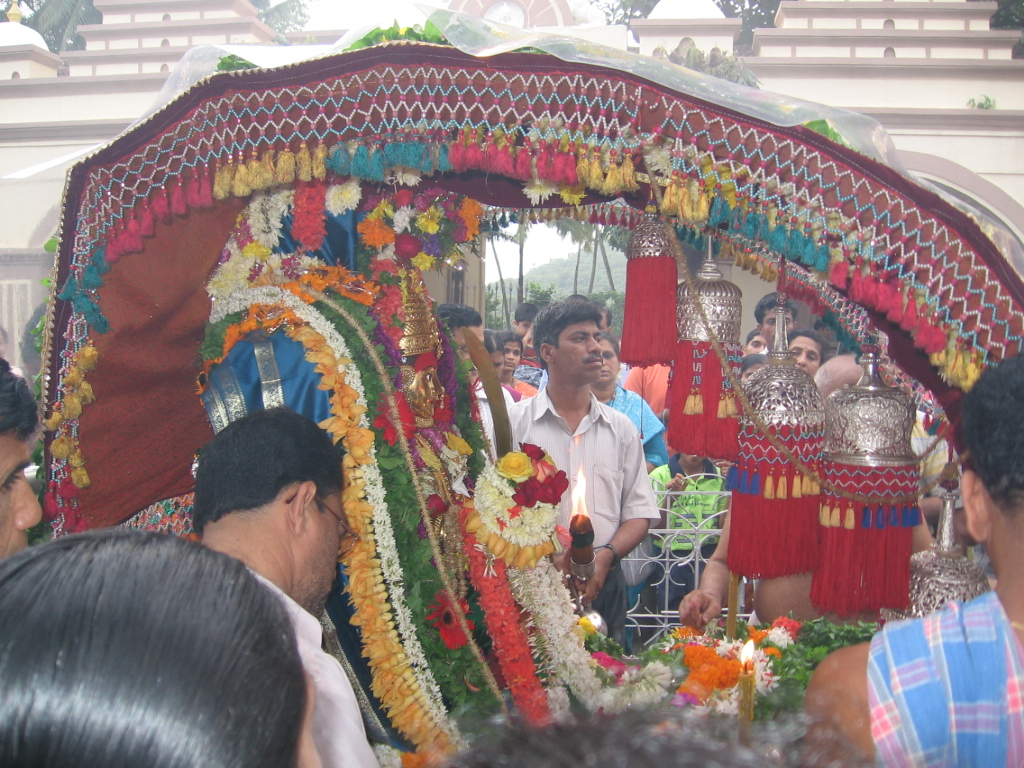
Palakhi

The following festivals are celebrated in all the Goan temples:

- Jatra
- Palakhi Utsav
- Navratri
- Tarangotsav, Dasarotsav
- Samvatsar (Saunsar) Padvo
- Gulalotsav
- Shigmo
- Kalotsav(Kalo/Jatra)

== See also ==
- Hindu temple architecture
- List of temples in Goa
