= Latambarcem =

Village in Goa, India

Coordinates: 15°39′N 73°56′E

Latambarcem is a village located in the North Goa district in the state of Goa, India. In 2001, the population was 6296. 3217 were male. 3079 were female.
