= Rivona =

- Village
- Location in Goa, India Rivona (India)
- Coordinates: 15.163809°N 74.102784°E
- Country: India
- State: Goa
- District: South Goa

Languages
  - Official: Konkani
- Time zone: UTC+5:30 (IST)
- PIN: 403705
- Vehicle registration: GA
- Website: goa.gov.in

Rivona or Rivana is a census town in Sanguem taluka, South Goa district in the Indian state of Goa.

== See also ==
- Vimleshwar temple, Rivona
