= Agrashala =

Agrashala ( अग्रशाला in Sanskrit, अगरसाळ in Konkani ) is a pilgrimage resthouse specially meant for devotees in Goan temples. Goan temples are usually seen surrounded by Agrashalas. The Agrashala provides following facilities for the temple patrons or the Mahajanas:

- Rest House
- Rooms for Mahajanas (and sometimes other devotees too ) to stay
- Food facilities
- Wedding Halls ( used for other purposes too )
- Sabhagruha ( Convention halls )
- Bathing and other facilities
- Some are even equipped with kitchens
- Some may even have special rooms for the Gurus
- Canteen
- Some times can be even used as a Vahan shala

== See also ==
- Goan temple
- List of Temples in Goa
