= Bhumika =

Aesthetic concept in Hinduism and Buddhism

Bhūmikā (Sanskrit: भूमिका) is derived from the word, Bhūmi, meaning earth, soil, ground or character. In the Upanishads, the Bhumikas are seven stages in the development of wisdom.

== Hinduism ==
The Upanishads speak about the seven bhūmikās or jñānabhūmis (fields of knowledge) or the seven stages of development of wisdom, and about the four kinds of jivanmuktas. In Chapter IV of the Varahā Upanishad, with regard to the characteristics of jivanmukti, Ribhu informs Nigadha of these seven:

- Subheccha or good desires
- Vichārāna or inquiry
- tanumānasī or pertaining to the thinned mind
- Sattvāpatti or the attainment of sattva
- Asamśakti or non-attachment
- Padārthabhāvanā or analysis of objects
- Turiya or the final stage.

Nigadha is also told that the bhūmikā which is of the form of pranava is formed of akāra, ukāra, makāra and the ardhamātra.

The turiya essence of akāra embraces the first, second and the third bhūmikās whose function is called mumukshu; the turiya essence of ukāra embraces the fourth bhūmikā when the mind is firmly fixed on the non-dual and is called brahmavit; the turiya essence of makāra embraces the fifth bhūmikā or sushuptipada (dreamless sleep) and is called brahmavidvara; the turiya essence of ardhamātra embraces the sixth bhūmikā (dreamless state) and is called brahmavidvariya, beyond which is the seventh bhūmikā or gudhasupti and is called brahmavidvarishta when one remains in the secondless state without fear and with his consciousness almost annihilated.

== Buddhism ==
In Buddhism, the term bhūmikā refers to a group of 49 to 52 mental factors that are found within the domain of consciousness. It is primarily used in the Mahāvibhāṣa and the Abhidharmakośa of the Sarvāstivāda school.

== Alternate definitions ==
Bhūmikā can also refer to a tablet or board for writing, subject, object or a receptacle, theatrical dress or an actor's costume, decoration of an image, a preface or introduction to a book.

The yajña bhūmikā is the altar on which Vedic rituals are conducted.
