= Shigmo =

Hindu festival in Goa, India

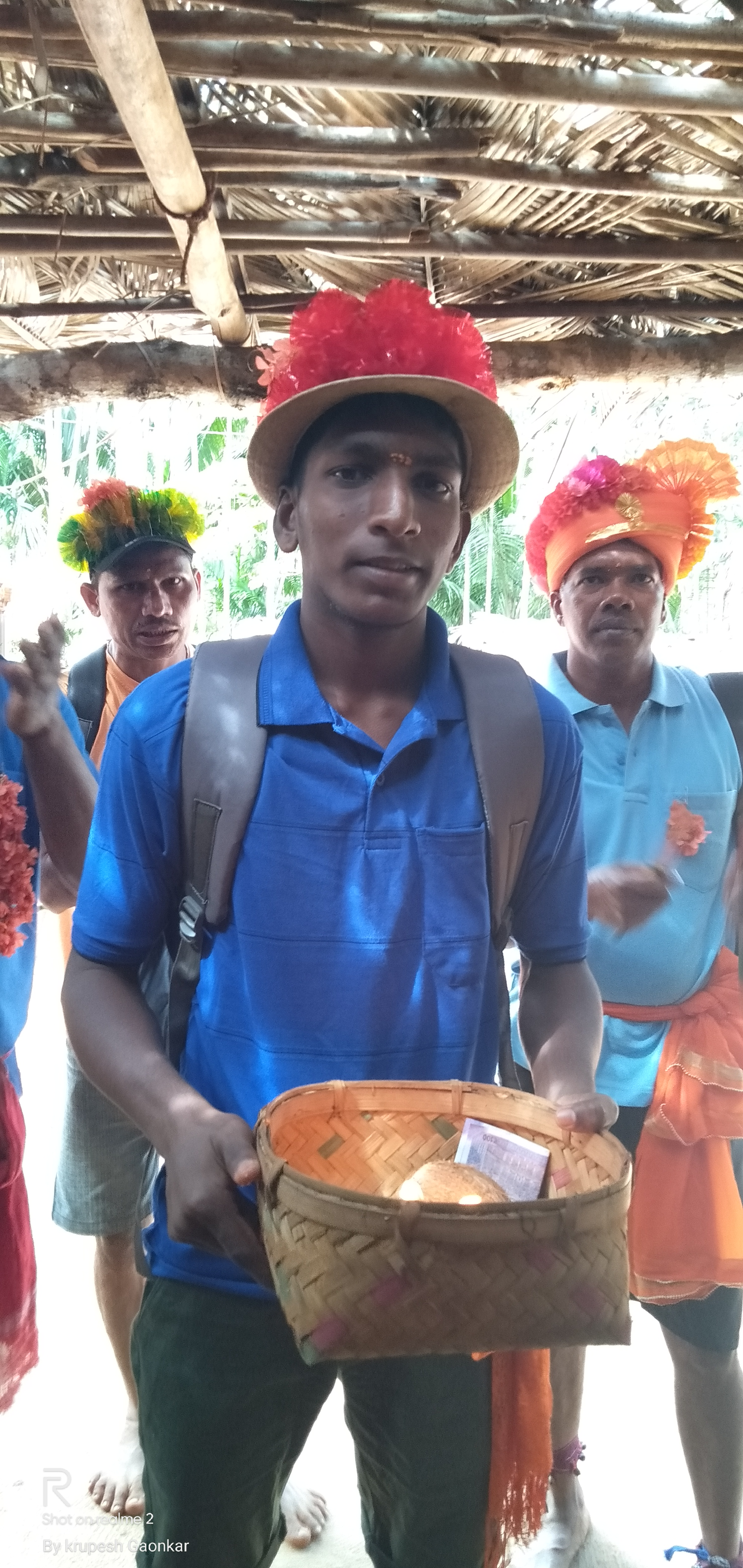
Young boy at the Shimgo holding aarat

Shigmo, or Shishirotsava is a spring festival celebrated in the Indian state of Goa, where it is one of the major festivals of the Hindu community. It is also celebrated by Konkani diaspora and Indian festival of Holi is part of it.

== Etymology ==
The Konkani word śigmō comes from the Prakrit word suggimaho which in turn is derived from the Sanskrit word sugrīṣmaka.

== Shigmo now ==
In recent years the state government has supported public Shigmo parades consisting of traditional folk and street dancers and elaborately built floats depicting scenes from regional mythology and religious scenes. Meanwhile, Shigmo festivals also continue in various rural parts of Goa, spanning over a fortnight, with different days earmarked for celebrations in different areas. This festival is celebrated around March each year. It is linked to the Hindu lunar calendar, hence its date according to the Gregorian calendar varies.

== Variations ==
There are two variants of Shigmo festival: Dhakto Shigmo ("small Shigmo") and Vhadlo Shigmo ("big Shigmo"). Dhakto Shigmo is generally celebrated by farmers, the labour class and the rural population, while Vhadlo Shigmo is of greater consequence and is celebrated by everyone together.

== Timing ==
Dhakto Shigmo begins some five days before the full-moon day of the Indian lunar month of Phalguna and ends on the full-moon day in the Old Conquests areas of Goa (the areas that were under Portuguese colonial rule for a longer period of time, starting from the sixteenth century). On the other hand, Vhadlo Shigmo is mostly celebrated in the New Conquests areas, beginning on the full-moon day of Phalguna and continuing for five days.

== Terminology ==
Naman are songs sung in chorus during the festival, when villagers assemble at a fixed place. Jot is another kind of song. Dances include Talgadi, Hanpet, Lamp Dance and Gopha. Dhol and Taso are drums, some of which can be huge, which people carry from door to door, dancing to their sound. Money is placed in a plate carried by the performers, in response to which they sing a song called the Tali, wishing the donor well. On the last day of the festival, it is believed that a spirit known as the Gade padap enters the dancers. Mand davarap refers to a collective bath taken after the festival comes to an end.

== Folk songs and dances, temple festival ==
Dhakto Shigmo can be considered mainly as a festival of folk songs and folk dances, while Vhadlo Shigmo is considered a festival performed in the village temple. It is celebrated in different temples on different dates around the same period. On the first day, the village deity is bathed and dressed in saffron robes. After the offering of food, a feast is held. Shigmo celebrated in the temples of Jambavali, Phatarpya, Kansarpal and Dhargale are very famous in Goa and the neighboring states and attract a large number of devotees and tourists.

Eg folk songs like

शेवते झाडाचो लांबा ताळयो

लांब ताळयो शेवते फुला कळो

== See also ==
- Zatra
- Chikhal Kalo
- Gadyachi Jatra
- Holika Dahan
