= Outline of Goa =

State in Southwest India

Location of Goa

The following outline is provided as an overview of and topical guide to Goa:

Goa – a state in southwest India, bounded by Maharashtra to the north and Karnataka to the east and south, while the Arabian Sea forms its western coast. It is India's smallest state by area and the fourth smallest by population. Goa is one of India's richest states, with a GDP per capita two and a half times that of the country. It was ranked the best-placed state by the Eleventh Finance Commission for its infrastructure, and ranked on top for the best quality of life in India by the National Commission on Population, based on the 12 Indicators.

== General reference ==
=== Names ===
- Official name(s): State of Goa
- Common name(s): Goa
  - Pronunciation:/ɡoʊə/
  - Etymology: Etymology of Goa
- Local name: Goem
- Nickname: Pearl of the Orient
- Adjectival(s): Goan, Goenkar, Goykar, Goes
- Demonym(s): Goans, Goenkars, Goes/Goesa, Goanese (considered derogatory by some)
- Abbreviations and name codes
  - ISO 3166-2 code: IN-GA
  - Vehicle registration code: GA, series: List of Regional Transport Office districts in Goa

=== Rankings (amongst India's states) ===
- by area (2011 census): 28th
- by population: 25th
- by density: 10th
- by percentage of urban population: 1st
- by percentage of rural population: 28th
- by gross domestic product (GDP) per capita (2024-25): 2nd
- by Human Development Index (HDI) (2023): 1st
- by literacy rate (2011): 3rd
- by sex ratio (2011): 10th

== Geography of Goa ==
Geography of Goa

- Goa is: an Indian state
- Population of Goa: 1,457,723
- Area of Goa: 3,702 km^{2} (1,429 sq mi)

=== Location of Goa ===
- Goa is situated within the following regions:
  - Northern Hemisphere
  - Eastern Hemisphere
    - Eurasia
      - Asia
        - South Asia
          - Indian subcontinent
            - India
              - Western India
                - Konkan
- Time zone: Indian Standard Time (UTC+05:30)

=== Environment of Goa ===
- Biodiversity hotspots in Goa
  - Western Ghats
- Climate of Goa
- Protected areas of Goa
  - National parks of Goa
    - Mollem National Park
  - Wildlife Sanctuaries of Goa
    - Bhagwan Mahaveer Wildlife Sanctuary
    - Bondla Wildlife Sanctuary
    - Cotigao Wildlife Sanctuary
    - Mhadei Wildlife Sanctuary
    - Netravali Wildlife Sanctuary
    - Salim Ali Bird Sanctuary
- Wildlife of Goa
  - Flora and fauna of Goa
    - Birds of Goa
    - Seabirds of Goa

==== Natural geographic features of Goa ====
- Bodies of water of Goa
  - Arabian Sea
  - Creeks of Goa
    - Baga Creek
    - St Inez Creek
  - Lakes of Goa
    - Mayem Lake
    - Nanda Lake (Ramsar site)
  - Rivers of Goa
- Hills and mountains of Goa
  - Sonsogor
  - Western Ghats (range)
- Highest Peak of Goa: Sonsogor
- Islands of Goa
- Konkan Coast
- Mountain passes in Goa
  - Braganza Ghats
  - Chorla Ghat
- Waterfalls in Goa

=== Administrative divisions of Goa ===
- Districts of Goa
- Talukas of Goa
- Urban agglomerations of Goa
- Cities and Towns of Goa
  - Municipal Corporations
    - Panaji
  - Municipalities
    - Bicholim
    - Canacona
    - Cuncolim
    - Curchorem
    - Mapusa (Mapusa Municipal Council)
    - Margao
    - Mormugao
    - Pernem
    - Ponda
    - Quepem
    - Sanguem
    - Sanquelim
    - Valpoi
- Parishes of Goa
- Renamed places of Goa
- Villages and Agraharas in Goa and their ancient names

=== Demography of Goa ===
Demographics of Goa

== Government and politics of Goa ==
- Form of government: Indian state government (parliamentary system of representative democracy)
- Capital of Goa: Panaji
- Elections in Goa

1963 | 1967 | 1972 | 1977 | 1980 | 1984 | 1989 | 1994 | 1999 | 2002 | 2007 | 2011 | 2017 | 2022 | 2027

- Political issues in Goa
  - Goa Special Status
- Politics of Goa
  - Political families of Goa
  - Political Parties in Goa
    - Aam Aadmi Party
    - Bharatiya Janata Party / Bharatiya Janata Party, Goa
    - Goa Forward Party
    - Indian National Congress / Goa Pradesh Congress Committee
    - Maharashtrawadi Gomantak Party
    - Revolutionary Goans Party

=== Union government in Goa ===
- Indian general election, 2009 (Goa)
- Indian general election, 2014 (Goa)
- Indian general election, 2019 (Goa)
- Indian general election, 2024 (Goa)
- North Goa (Lok Sabha constituency)
- South Goa (Lok Sabha constituency)
- Rajya Sabha members from Goa

=== Branches of the government of Goa ===
Government of Goa

==== Executive branch of the government of Goa ====
- Head of state: Governor of Goa
  - official residence - Raj Bhavan
- Head of government: Chief Minister of Goa,
  - Deputy Chief Ministers of Goa
- Cabinet of Goa: Goa Council of Ministers
- Departments and agencies
  - Directorate of Fire and Emergency Services, Goa
  - Gazetteer of India, Union Territory: Goa, Daman and Diu
  - Goa Human Rights Commission
  - Goa Institute of Public Administration and Rural Development
  - Goa Konkani Akademi
  - Goa Lokayukta
  - Goa Public Service Commission
  - Goa State Commission For Women
  - Goa State Election Commission
  - Goa State Information Commission
  - Gomant Vibhushan
  - Kadamba Transport Corporation
  - Sports Authority of Goa
  - Yashadamini Puraskar

==== Legislative branch of the government of Goa ====
- Goa Legislature
  - Goa Legislative Assembly
    - 1st|2nd|3rd|4th|5th|6th|7th|8th
  - Constituencies of Goa Legislative Assembly
  - Secretariat of Goa
  - Legislative capital: Porvorim

==== Judicial branch of the government of Goa ====
Judiciary of Goa

- High Court of Bombay at Goa
- Judicial capital: Porvorim

=== Law and order in Goa ===
- Amendments to the Constitution of India regarding Goa
  - Twelfth Amendment of the Constitution of India
  - Fourteenth Amendment of the Constitution of India
  - Fifty-sixth Amendment of the Constitution of India
  - Seventy-first Amendment of the Constitution of India
- Animal rights in Goa
- Capital punishment in Goa
- Goa civil code
- Goa Lok Adalat
- Human rights in Goa
  - Freedom of religion in Goa
  - LGBT rights in Goa
    - Pride De Goa
  - Recognition of same-sex unions in Goa
- Law enforcement in Goa
  - Goa Police
  - Polícia do Estado da Índia (1946 - 1961)
  - Corpo de Polícia e Fiscalização da Índia (pre-1946)
- Mundkar Act
- Organised Crime in Goa
  - Goa mafia
- Penal system of Goa
- Reservation in Goa

== History of Goa ==
History of Goa

- Timeline of Goan history

=== History of Goa, by period ===
==== Portuguese Goa ====
- Siege of Anjadiva (1506)
- Portuguese conquest of Goa 1510
- Siege of Goa 1571
- Vijayanagara Invasion of Goa 1558
- Convention of Goa 1635
- Battle of Goa 1638
- Luso-Adil Shahi War (1654–1655)
- Battle of Margão (1659)
- Siege of Ponda (1675)
- Sambhaji's Invasion 1684
- Pinto Revolt 1787
- British rule in Portuguese India 1797
- Anglo-Portuguese Treaty of 1878
- Satyagraha movement in Goa 1946
- Goa Revolution Day 1947
- Goa liberation movement
- Goa Liberation Day

==== Indian Goa ====
- Annexation of Portuguese India

=== History of Goa, by subject ===
- History of Goan Catholics
- Printing in Goa

== Culture of Goa ==
Culture of Goa

- Architecture of Goa
  - Architecture of Goan Catholics
  - Goan houses
  - Goan temple
- Comunidades of Goa
- Goan cuisine
  - Goan Catholic cuisine
- Cultural capital: Margao
- Galleries, Libraries, Museums and Archives in Goa
  - Archaeological Museum and Portrait Gallery
  - Dr Francisco Luis Gomes District Library
  - Goa Science Centre
  - Goa State Central Library
  - Goa State Museum
  - Goa University Library
  - Institute Menezes Braganza/Instituto Vasco da Gama
  - Kala Academy
  - Naval Aviation Museum
- Geographical Indications of Goa
  - Agassaim Brinjal
  - Bebinca
  - Feni
  - Goan cashew
  - Goan Khaje
  - Harmal Chilli
  - Khola Chilli
  - Mankurad Mango
  - Myndoli Banana
  - Sat Shiro Bheno
- Languages of Goa
  - Portuguese language in Goa
- Media in Goa
  - Mailing list
    - Goanet
  - Newspapers and magazines
  - Radio
  - Television
    - DD Goa
    - Konkani-language television channels
- Monuments in Goa
  - Azad Maidan
  - Forts of Goa
  - Gates of Goa
  - Monuments of National Importance in Goa
  - State Protected Monuments in Goa
  - Palaces of Goa
- Public squares in Goa
- Susegad
- Symbols of Goa
  - Seal of Goa
- World Heritage Sites in Goa
  - Churches and convents of Goa

=== Art in Goa ===
- Arts of Goa
  - Chitari art
  - Kaavi art
- Cinema of Goa
  - Konkani cinema
    - National Film Award for Best Feature Film in Konkani
- Cultural and technical festivals of Goan colleges
- Dances of Goa
  - Goan folk dances
- Festivals in Goa
  - Carnival in Goa
  - Chikhal Kalo
  - Dindi
  - Goa Arts and Literature Festival
  - Goa Sand Art Festival
  - International Film Festival of India
  - Monti Fest
  - Sao Joao Festival in Goa
  - Serendipity Arts Festival
  - Shigmo
  - Sunburn Festival
  - Zagor
  - Zatra
- Literature of Goa
  - Goan Catholic literature
  - Goan writers
    - Fiction writers from Goa
    - Poets in (and from) Goa
- Music of Goa
  - Bands from Goa
  - Dulpod
  - Fell
  - Goa trance
  - Goans in Hindi film music composition
  - Konkani liturgical music
  - Mando
  - Ovi
  - Traditional Musical Instruments of Goa
    - Dhol
    - Ghumot
    - Kansallem
    - Mhadalem
    - Shamel
  - Ver
  - Zoti
- Theatre in Goa
  - Sangeet Natak
  - Tiatr
    - Tiatr Academy of Goa
    - Tiatrists of Goa

=== People of Goa ===
People of Goa

- Caste system in Goa
- Ethnic and social groups of Goa and Konkan
  - Goan Catholics
    - Culture of Goan Catholics
    - Goan Catholic names and surnames
    - Notable Goan Catholics
  - Goan Hindus
    - Culture of Goan Hindus
  - Goan Muslims
- People from Goa

=== Religion in Goa ===
Religion in Goa

- Christianity in Goa
  - Christianization of Goa
  - Pre-Portuguese Christianity in Goa
  - Roman Catholic Archdiocese of Goa and Daman
- Hinduism in Goa
  - Goan temple
    - Temples in Goa
    - Rock-cut temples in Goa
- Islam in Goa
  - Goan Mosques
    - Safa Mosque
- Jainism in Goa

=== Sports in Goa ===
Sports in Goa

- Chess in Goa
  - Goa State Chess Association
- Cricket in Goa
  - Goa Cricket Association
    - Goa cricket team
    - Goa women's cricket team
  - Goans in cricket
- Field hockey in Goa
  - Goans in field hockey
- Football in Goa
  - AIFF Elite Academy
  - Goa Derby
  - Goa Football Association
    - Goa Football League
      - Goa Professional League
        - GFA First Division League
      - Goan State Football Champions
      - Goa Women's League
      - Goa Police Cup
    - Goa football team
    - Goa women's football team
  - Goans in football
- Goan Sports Association
- Goans in sports
- Running in Goa
  - Goa Marathon

=== Symbols of Goa ===
Symbols of Goa

- State animal: Gaur, (Bos gaurus)
- State bird: Ruby Throated Yellow Bulbul, (Pycnonotus gularis)
- State fish: Grey mullet/Shevtto in Konkani (Mugil cephalus)
- State flower: Jasmine, (Plumeria rubra)
- State fruit: Cashew, (Anacardium occidentale)
- State heritage tree: Coconut palm, (Cocos nucifera)
- State motto:
  - Devanagari - सर्वे भद्राणि पश्यन्तु मा कश्चिद् दुःखमाप्नुयात्
  - Latin script - (May everyone see goodness, may none suffer any pain)
- State seal: Seal of Goa
- State tree: Matti, (Terminalia crenulata)

== Economy and infrastructure of Goa ==
Economy of Goa

- Commercial capital: Margao
- Communications in Goa
  - Internet in Goa
    - Goa Broad Band Network
- Currency of Goa:
  - Xerafim:- Before 1668
  - Portuguese Indian rupia (1668 - 1958)
  - Portuguese Indian escudo (1958 - 1961)
  - Indian rupee (1961–present)
- Dams and Reservoirs in Goa
- Hotels in Goa
- Indian Naval Bases
  - INS Gomantak, Vasco da Gama
  - INS Hansa, Dabolim
  - INS Mandovi, Verem, Reis Magos
  - INHS Jeevanti,Vasco da Gama
- Lapis de Goa
- Mapusa Municipal Market
- Prisons in Goa
- Shopping Malls in Goa
- Stadiums and Sports Infrastructure in Goa
  - Arlem Breweries Ground
  - Bhausaheb Bandodkar Ground
  - Campal Indoor Complex
  - Dr. Rajendra Prasad Stadium
  - Dr Shyama Prasad Mukherjee Indoor Stadium
  - Duler Stadium
  - Fatorda Stadium
  - Goa Street Circuit
  - GMC Athletic Stadium
  - Goa Cricket Association Academy Ground
  - Goa Cricket Association Stadium
  - Railway Stadium, Vasco da Gama
  - Tilak Maidan Stadium
- Tourism in Goa
  - Beaches of Goa
    - Arambol
    - Chapora Beach
    - Galgibaga Beach
    - Palolem Beach
    - Querim Beach
    - Vagator Beach
  - Casinos in Goa
  - Fontainhas
- Traditional occupations of Goa
- Transport in Goa
  - Airports in Goa
  - Bridges in Goa
    - Atal Setu
    - Mandovi Bridge
    - New Zuari Bridge
    - Ponte Conde de Linhares
    - Zuari Bridge
  - National Waterways of India
    - Chapora River
    - Cumbarjua Canal
    - Mandovi River
    - Mapusa River
    - Sal River
    - Zuari River
  - Ports in Goa
    - Mormugao Port
  - Railway in Goa
    - Hubli railway division
      - Part of South Western Railway zone
      - Guntakal–Vasco da Gama section (formerly West of India Portuguese Railway)
    - Karwar railway division
      - Part of Konkan Railway
    - Skybus Metro
  - Roads in Goa
    - 18th June Road
    - List of eponymous roads in Goa
    - National Highways in Goa/National Highways in Goa (old numbering)

== Education in Goa ==
Education in Goa

- Goa Board of Secondary and Higher Secondary Education
- Goa University
- Institutes of Higher Education in Goa
- Schools in Goa

== Health in Goa ==
Health in Goa

- COVID-19 pandemic in Goa
- Goa Dental College
- Institute of Psychiatry and Human Behaviour
- Medical Colleges in Goa
- Ambulance service
  - GVK EMRI 108

== See also ==
- Outline of India
