= Flora and fauna of Goa =

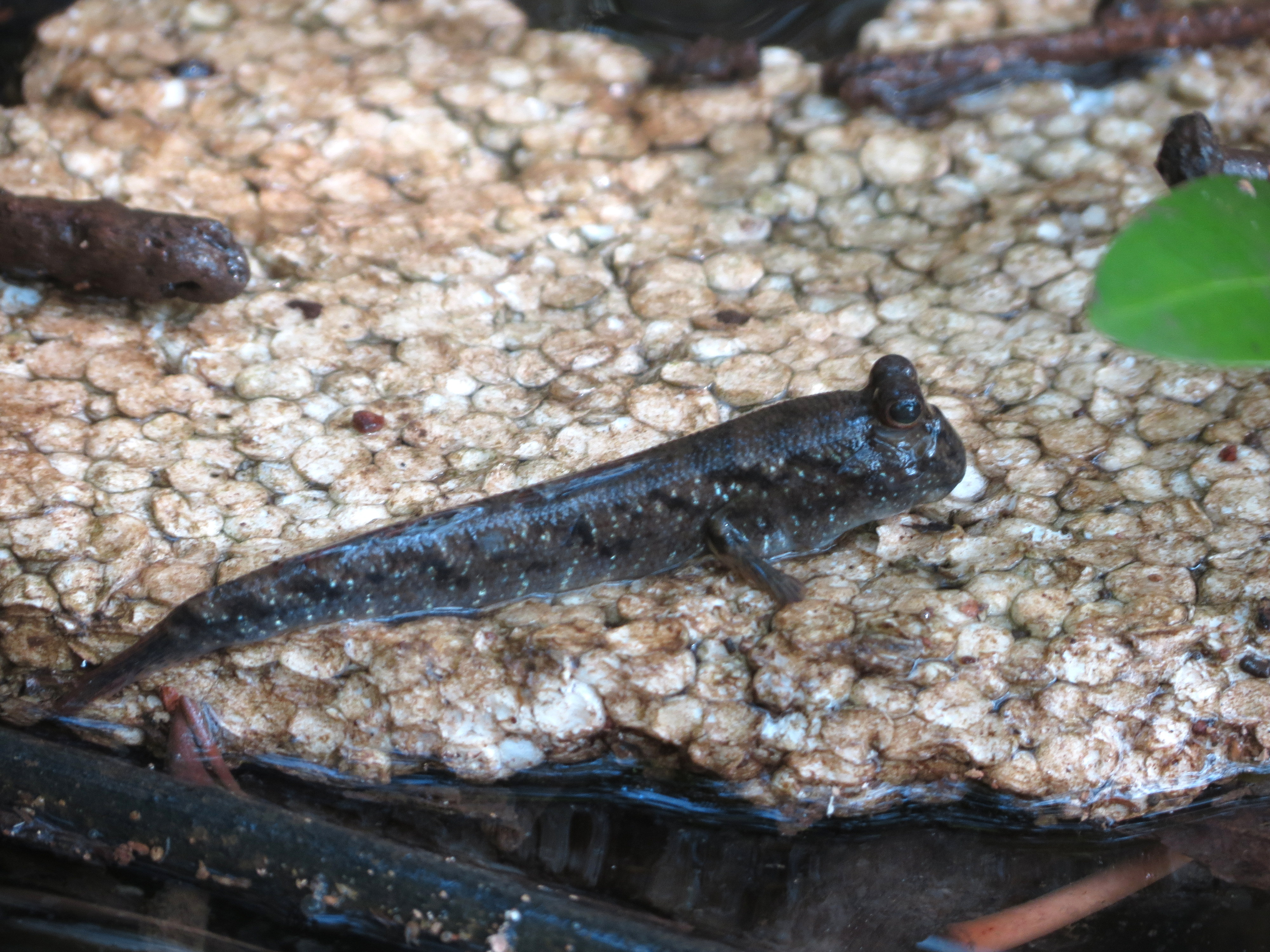
Mangrove mudskipper in the Salim Ali bird sanctuary.

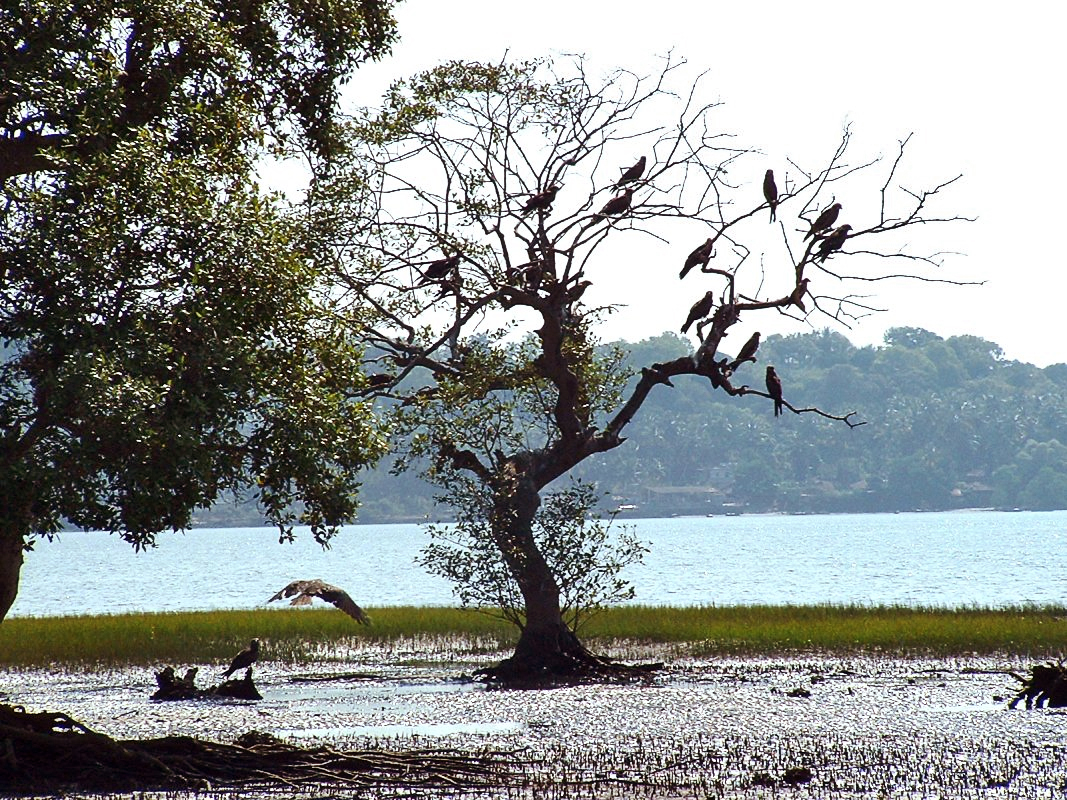
Colony of Birds by the Chapxxx a River

Forest cover in Goa is diverse. Goa is India's smallest state terms of area and the fourth smallest in terms of population. Goa is located on the west coast of India in the region known as the Konkan Forest cover in Goa stands at 1,424 km², most of which is owned by the government. Government owned forest is estimated at 1224.38 km² whilst private is given as 200 km². Most of the forests in the state are located in the interior eastern regions of the state. The Western Ghats, which form most of eastern Goa, have been internationally recognised as one of the biodiversity hotspots of the world. In the February 1999 issue of National Geographic Magazine, Goa was compared with the Amazon rainforest and the Congo Basin for its rich tropical biodiversity.

Nanda Lake is the first and the only Ramsar wetland site in Goa. Goa's state animal is the Gaur, the state bird is the Ruby-throated yellow Bulbul, which is a variation of Black-crested Bulbul, and the state tree is the Matti.

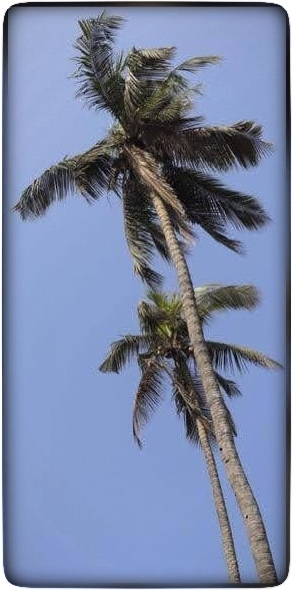
Coconut palms with their undulating fronds in Goa, India

The important forests products are bamboo canes, Maratha barks, chillar barks and the bhirand. Coconut trees are ubiquitous and are present in almost all areas of Goa barring the elevated regions. Much deciduous vegetation, including teak, sal, cashew and mango trees, is present. Fruits include jackfruits, mangos, pineapples and blackberries.

Foxes, wild boars and migratory birds are found in the jungles of Goa. The avifauna includes kingfishers, mynas and parrots. Numerous types of fish are also caught off the coast of Goa and in its rivers. Crabs, lobsters, shrimps, jellyfish, oysters and catfish form some of the piscine catch. Goa also has a high snake population, which keeps the rodent population in control. Goa has many famous National Parks, including the renowned Salim Ali bird sanctuary.

Name of the Sanctuary	Area (km²)	Location (Taluka)	Distance from Panjim (km)
Mollem National Park	107	Sanguem	71
Bhagwan Mahavir Wildlife Sanctuary	133	Sanguem	65
Cotigao Wildlife Sanctuary	86	Canacona	60
Bondla Wildlife Sanctuary	8	Ponda	52
Dr. Salim Ali Bird Sanctuary	1.76	Tiswadi	8
Madei Wildlife Sanctuary	208.48	Sattari	50
Netravali Wildlife Sanctuary	211.05	Sanguem	60
Total	755.31		

Goa has more than 33% of its geographic area under government forests (1224.38 km²) of which about 62% has been brought under Protected Areas (PA) of Wildlife Sanctuaries and National Park. Since there is a substantial area under private forests and a large tract under cashew, mango, coconut, etc. plantations, the total forest and tree cover constitutes 56.6% of the geographic area.

== See also ==
- List of seabirds of Goa
