= Luso-Adil Shahi War (1654–1655) =

17th century war in India

- Part of Adil Shahi–Portuguese conflicts
Date	1654–March 7 of 1655
Location	Goa, Portuguese India
Result	Portuguese victory

Belligerents
Portuguese Empire	Sultanate of Bijapur

Commanders and leaders
Brás de Castro	Abdulla Hakim

The Luso-Adil Shahi War of 1654–1655 was a brief conflict between the Kingdom of Portugal and the Sultanate of Bijapur, which invaded the "Terras Firmes de Goa" at the incitement of the Dutch East India Company.

Portugal conquered Goa in 1510 and went to war several times with the neighboring Sultanate of Bijapur over possession of the so-called "Terras Firmes" around the island of Goa, on the mainland.

Since then, the Dutch East India Company had begun trading in the Indian Ocean and supporting the enemies of the Portuguese. In the court of Bijapur, there was a party hostile to the Portuguese, led by the queen-mother and Abdulla Hakim and both agreed to negotiate with the Dutch.

In late 1653 or early 1654, a Dutch fleet surrounded Goa, waiting for the Adil Shah to attack the city by land as agreed, but, since the Sultan's army did not appear, the Dutch retreated.

It was only between August and October of 1654 that Abdulla Hakim invaded Bardez with an army and briefly put in danger the food supply to Goa. Bijapur's forces were, however, repelled.

The Adil Shah admitted having declared war on Portugal without sufficient reason and ordered his captains to withdraw from Bardez, Salcete and to open their ports to trade. With this explanation, the Portuguese Governor Brás de Castro ratified the treaties of January 29 of 1582, and April 3 of 1633, on March 7 of 1655.

The Sultanate of Bijapur would attack Goa again in 1659, but were also defeated. Nevertheless, relations between Portugal and Bijapur were more peaceful in the 17th century than in the 16th century.

== See also ==
- Dutch-Portuguese War
- Portuguese conquest of Goa
- Adil Shahi-Portuguese conflicts
- War of the League of the Indies
- History of Goa
- Battle of Goa (1683)
- Battle of Margão (1659)
