= Animal welfare and rights in Goa =

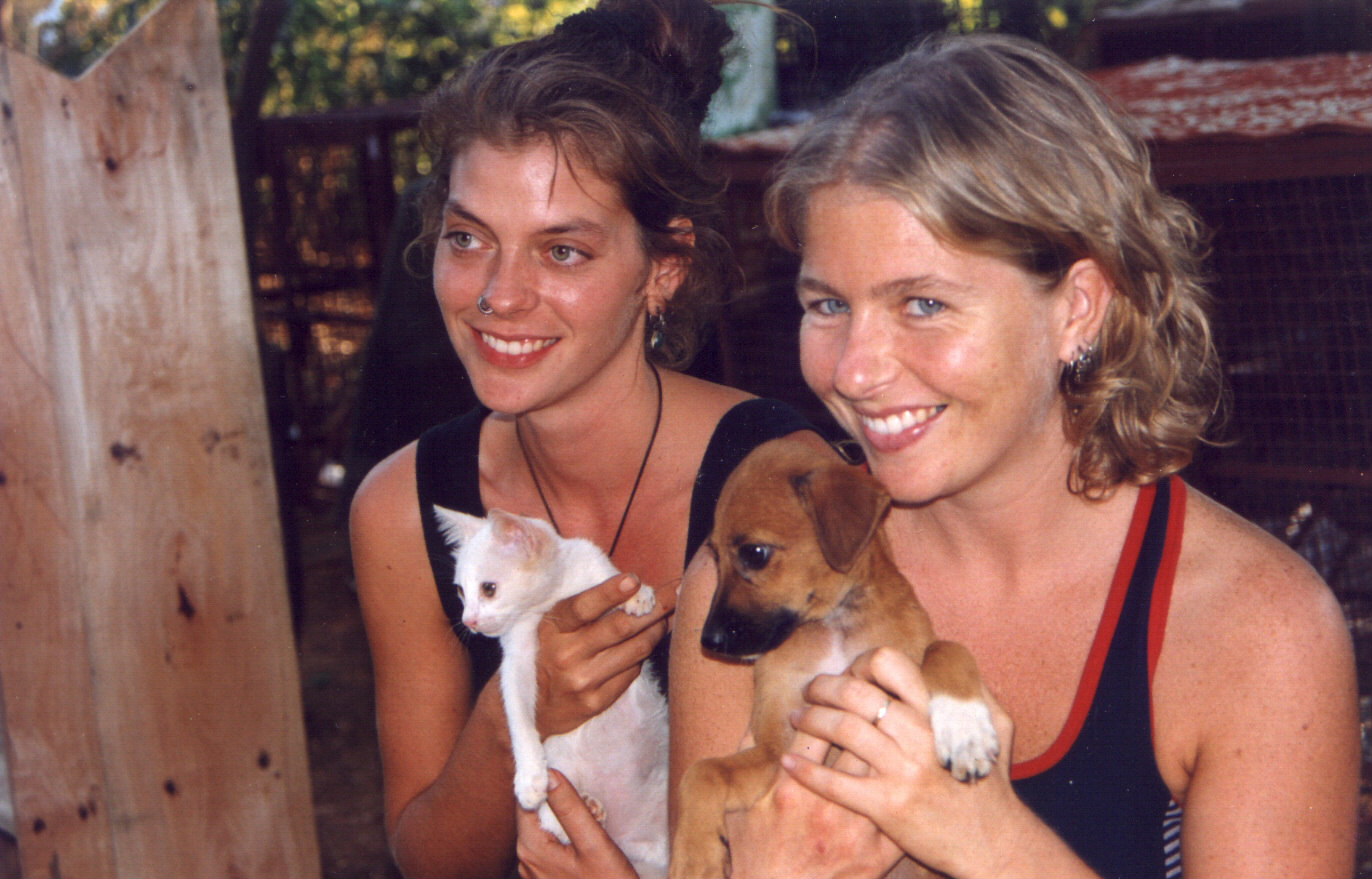
Sonia Hillidge (right) and Dawn. Early International Animal Rescue volunteers in Goa, circa late 1990s. At Saligao.

Animal welfare and rights in Goa refers to campaigns undertaken in the region of Goa, on the west coast of India, which has been on the rise in recent years. Goa is a popular tourist destination, visited by those from abroad and the rest of India, and concerns over animal rights has been built up both by local and visitor campaigns over the same.

== Early activism and initiatives ==
Among the active animal rights groups are the People for Animals-Goa, the International Animal Rescue group, now managed as the WVS India and known as the Hicks ITC. PFA-Goa (People for Animals-Goa) is run by trustees and employs two veterinary doctors, two vet assistants, three admin staff and 12 workers at both its shelters.

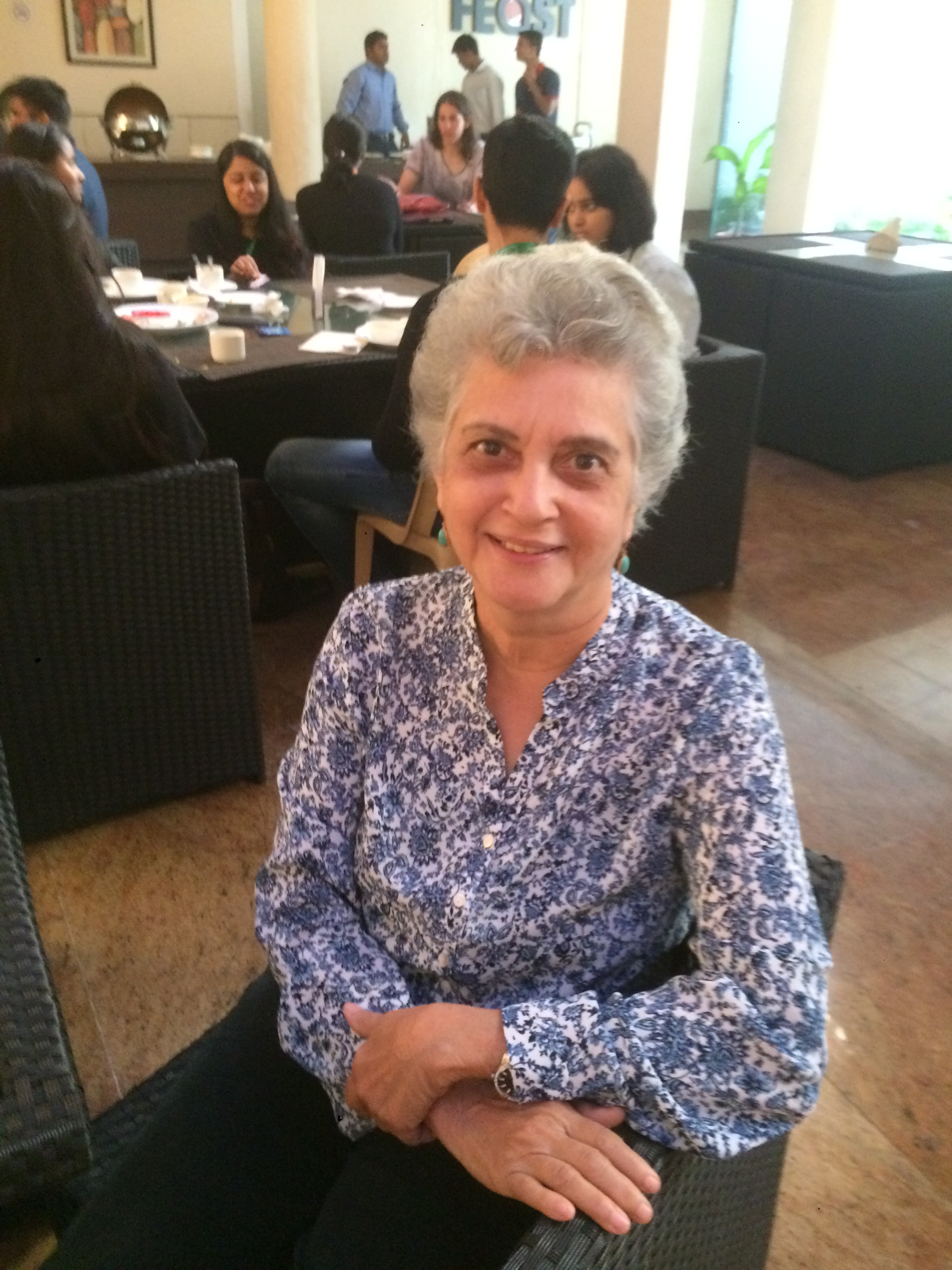
Norma Alvares, environmental lawyer, animal rights campaigner

Environmental lawyer, campaigner and Padma Shree award winner Norma Alvares has argued that "working on animal rights was a natural progression from my environmental activism. Animals are a part of the environment.... I cannot imagine a world where only humans have a place and other species must make way for human ideas of development; of cities, townships. My formal entrance into animal rights began when Mrs. Maneka Gandhi approached me about setting up an animal welfare organization in Goa. This is when we set up People for Animals, which was the first animal welfare organisation in Goa." Alvares is president of PFA Goa, and member of the State Animal Welfare Board. Animal rights activists have argued about the rich yet fragile nature of the ecology around Goa, specially in the Western Ghat/Sahayadri areas that partly overlap Goa, which are known for their "rare and endemic species of reptiles and amphibians".

== Issues ==
=== Stray dogs, rabies ===
A range of issues have been raised, often dealing with strays and a humane management of the same – dogs and cattle. Related issues taken up include vaccinations campaigns to reduce the risks of rabies, In 2014, a coalition of non-profit and campaign groups in Goa – including International Animal Rescue, People for Animals Goa, South Goa Welfare Trust for Animals, Panjim Animal Welfare Society (PAWS), Goa SPCA and Goa Animal Welfare Trust – came together with the Mission Rabies to undertake a campaign against rabies, with the aim of making Goa rabies-free by 2018. The poisoning of stray dogs, among other issues. Animal shelters are offered by People For Animals Goa. Its facilities also cover sterilisation, vaccination, pet adoption, animal ambulance, rehabilitation of abandoned cattle. PFA has also undertaken litigation in courts over the rights of animals. People For Animals Goa is one of the seven organisations from across India that came together to form The Federation of Indian Animal Protection Organisation (FIAPO), according to yourstory dot com.

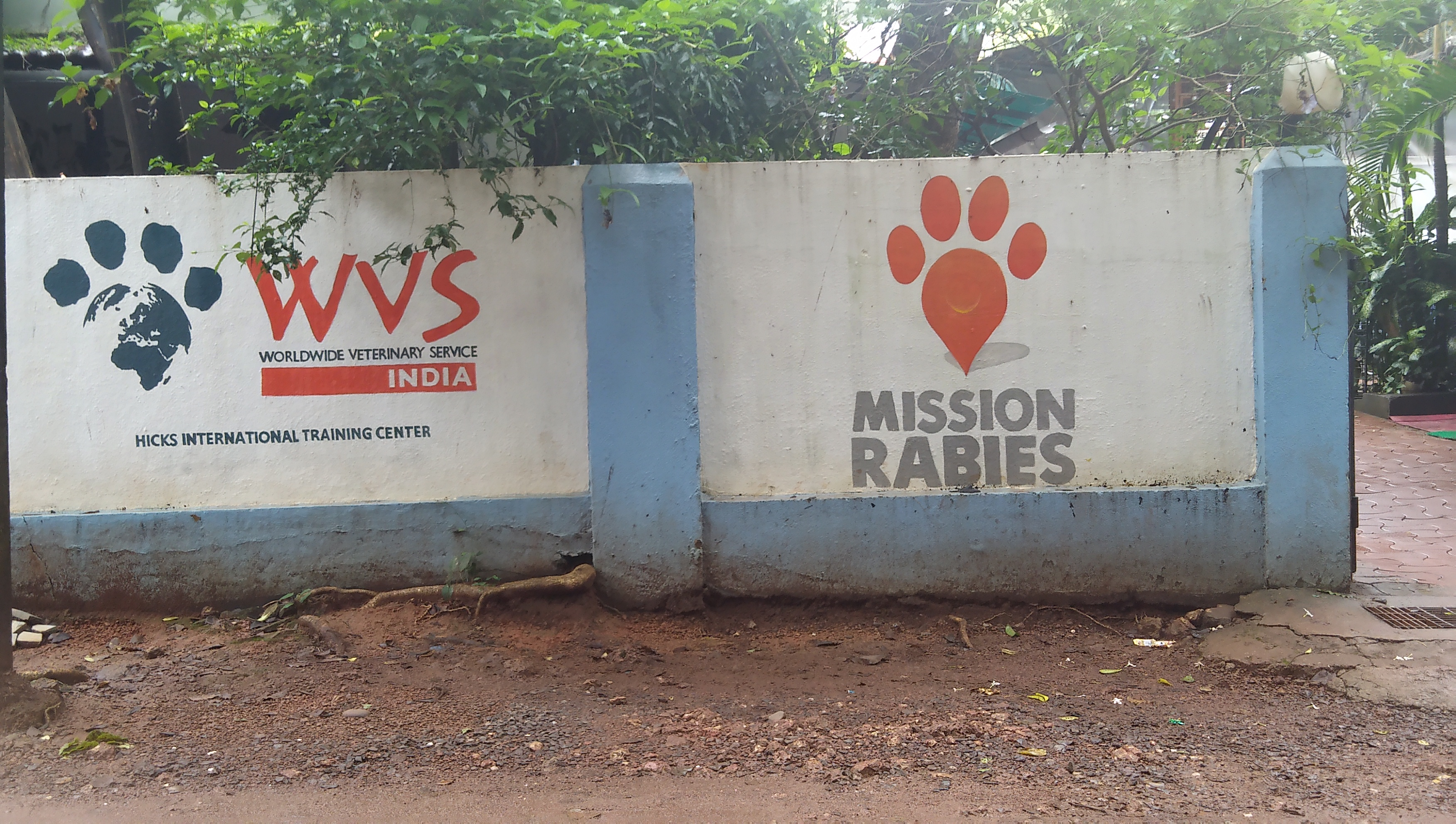
WVS, formerly the International Animal Rescue, shifted from Saligao to Assagao.

The WVS Hicks ITC, is currently managed by the WVS India, and was formerly known as the International Animal Rescue]. Some two decades ago, International Animal Rescue started with concerns over the large number of stray dogs in Goa. Today it has a training centre for humane dog population control, rabies diagnosis and control, and a low-cost clinic for sick and injured dogs and cats. Based in Assagao. It also offers animal ambulance, veterinary clinic with X-ray, shelter, sterilization, vaccination, wildlife rescue, awareness programmes and pet adoption. WVS Hicks' sister-charity Mission Rabies also undertakes the vaccination of stray dogs and their release back in their environment. Earlier, in 2007, IAR has also worked to save stray cattle in Goa. International Animal Rescue was founded in 1988 by John Hicks from Worthing, Sussex and registered as a UK-based charity in 1989. In India, IAR has clinics in Goa and Tamil Nadu. In Goa, its focus is "to end the suffering of the stray dogs and cats", and says it sterilised and treated over 85,000 animals by the end of 2007. Prominent ad professional from Mumbai Lynn de Souza has set up the Goa SPCA. The Goa SPCA's Socrates Oliver Veterinary Hospital is located at the Torda area of Salvador-do-Mundo village. Services include animal hospital, shelter, anti-rabies vaccination, sterilisation, pet adoption, awareness, animal welfare workshops.

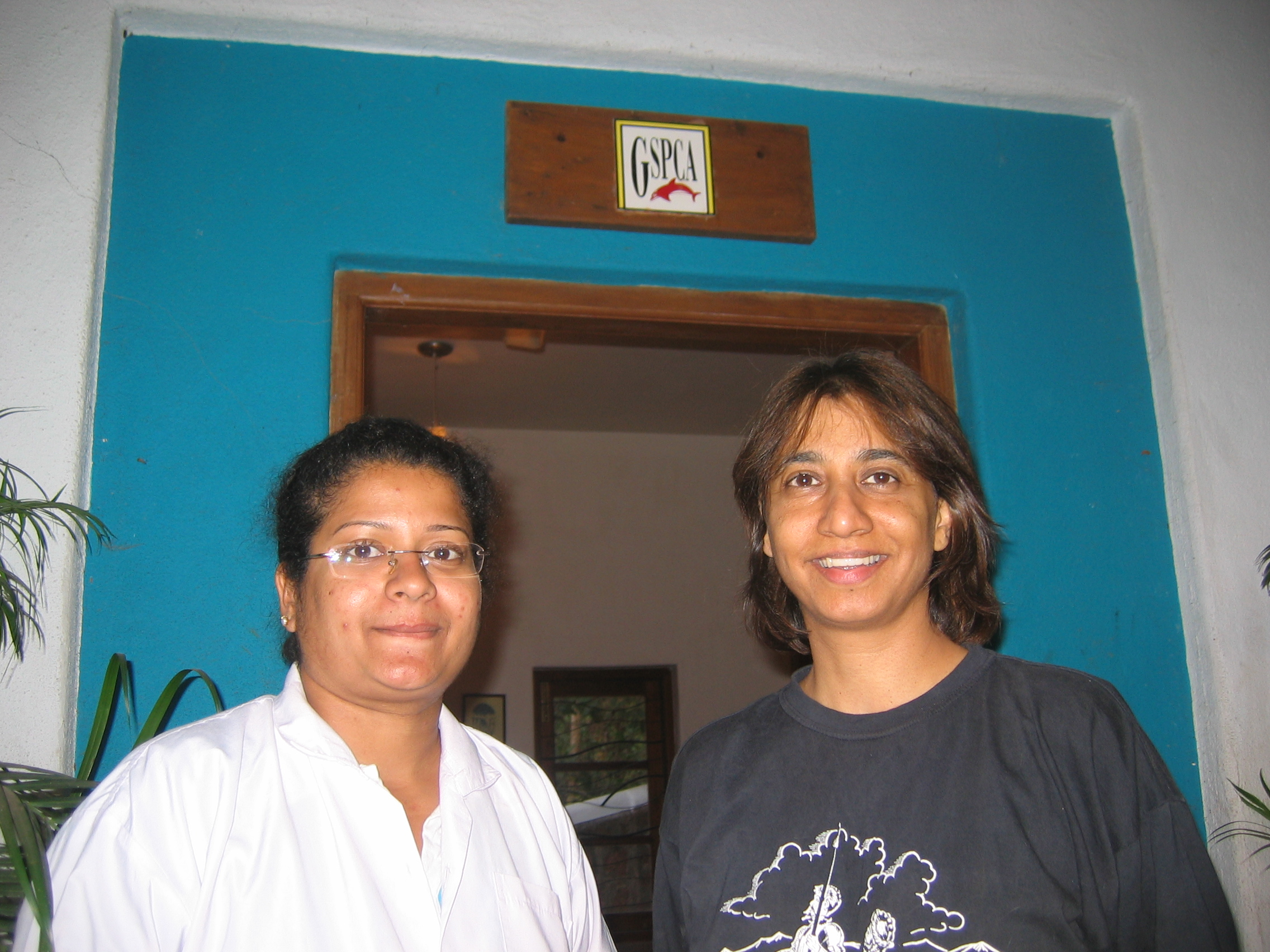
Advertising professional Lynn de Souza, right, with staff, at the SPCA in Torda, Porvorim, Goa

It has been run by former Lintas chairperson and chief executive Lynn de Souza.

Other organisations active in taking care of dogs include I Love Goa Dogs, Goa Dogs Trust at Arambol; the Noah's Animal Care Centre at Calangute, which is a family charitable trust promoting sterilisation and vaccination of street dogs primarily in Calangute. PFA has animal shelters at Ponda and Vasco. Goa Animal Welfare Trust, Sonsoddo, Raia runs an animal hospital, shelter, animal ambulance, sterilization, anti-rabies vaccination, pet adoption. South Goa Welfare Trust for Animals undertakes sterilizing dogs in allotted jurisdiction, rescue, rehabilitate, and treating injured street dogs. No More Puppies sterilizes, feeds and looks after street animals in Varca.

=== Cattle, shelters ===
Issues of "stray cattle" have also been raised and worked on. After animal-rights campaigners took up the issues, Goa's traditional bullfights were also disallowed by the courts after the matter was raised by animal-rights campaigners. Cow-shelters are run by organisations such as the Dwarkapuri Goseva Ashram at Usgao and the Gomantak Gosevak Mahasang, at Mayem. The Corporation of City of Panaji Animal Shelter is run out of the St. lnez locality. CCP also undertakes other initiatives like ensuring animals have access to water during the pandemic lockdown.

=== Wildlife concerns ===
Goa has also seen a growing pressures on wildlife habitats. Concerns over poaching and selling of wildlife meat and organs has also been raised.

Herpactive/Hypnale Research Station has been working to carry out research on wildlife in the Western Ghats region of India, including in Goa. It offers a platform for wildlife researchers to document and study the biodiversity of the region that encompasses the states of Goa, Karnataka and Maharashtra." It also aims at carrying out field projects "related to conservation, biology and data collection and help maintain the stock of biological wealth ... (and) to develop as a repository of scientific knowledge on the Bio-region and a database source on the North Western Ghats that are also known as the Sahyadris."

=== Snake rescue ===
Over some time now, local youth – including some women – have also got interested and taken up volunteering in fields like wildlife and snake-rescue services. These are found to be useful as snakes can occasionally enter residential and other in-habitation areas, in a state which is still significantly rural. Lists of snake-rescuers in Goa are available online. Besides wildlife rescue and rehabilitation, Mapusa-based Green Cross has conducting awareness drives. It has held snake shows too.

=== Awareness campaigns ===
Goa has been sensitising its school students over cruelty to animals The State Council of Educational Research and Training (SCERT) asked schools in the State to teach a program on "compassionate citizens".

=== Cruelty in festivals, entertainment, pet shops ===
Pigling torture during local festivals has also been raised. Using elephants for entertainment has caused concern. Other issues raised by animal rights campaigners in Goa include prevention of cruelty in pet shops.

=== Miscellaneous issues ===
Artificial waterholes have been attempted to avoid man-animal conflict in forest areas. Cruel methods to kill male chicks has been raised. During the 2020 pandemic-related lockdown, attempts were made to ensure that animals did not go hungry during the pandemic lockdown of 2020 were also raised. Individuals have also taken up other causes such as promoting veganism. Panjim Animal Welfare Society, PAWS, in St Inez, Panjim also undertakes animal welfare work. ARC South Goa, was launched in 2005 in the Palolem area. Welfare for Animals in Goa, launched in 2005, works in Siolim on adoptions, sterilisations, rescuing strays and injured cattle, runs a cattle sanctuary, vet rescue clinic and a shelter for injured cows, goats, pigs, chickens.

== See also ==
- Animal welfare and rights in India
- Conservation in India
