= Goans in sports =

Goa is a tiny region along the west coast of India, and is known for its many sportsmen.

== See also ==
- Goans in football
- Goans in cricket
