= Goan houses =

Overview of houses in Goa, India

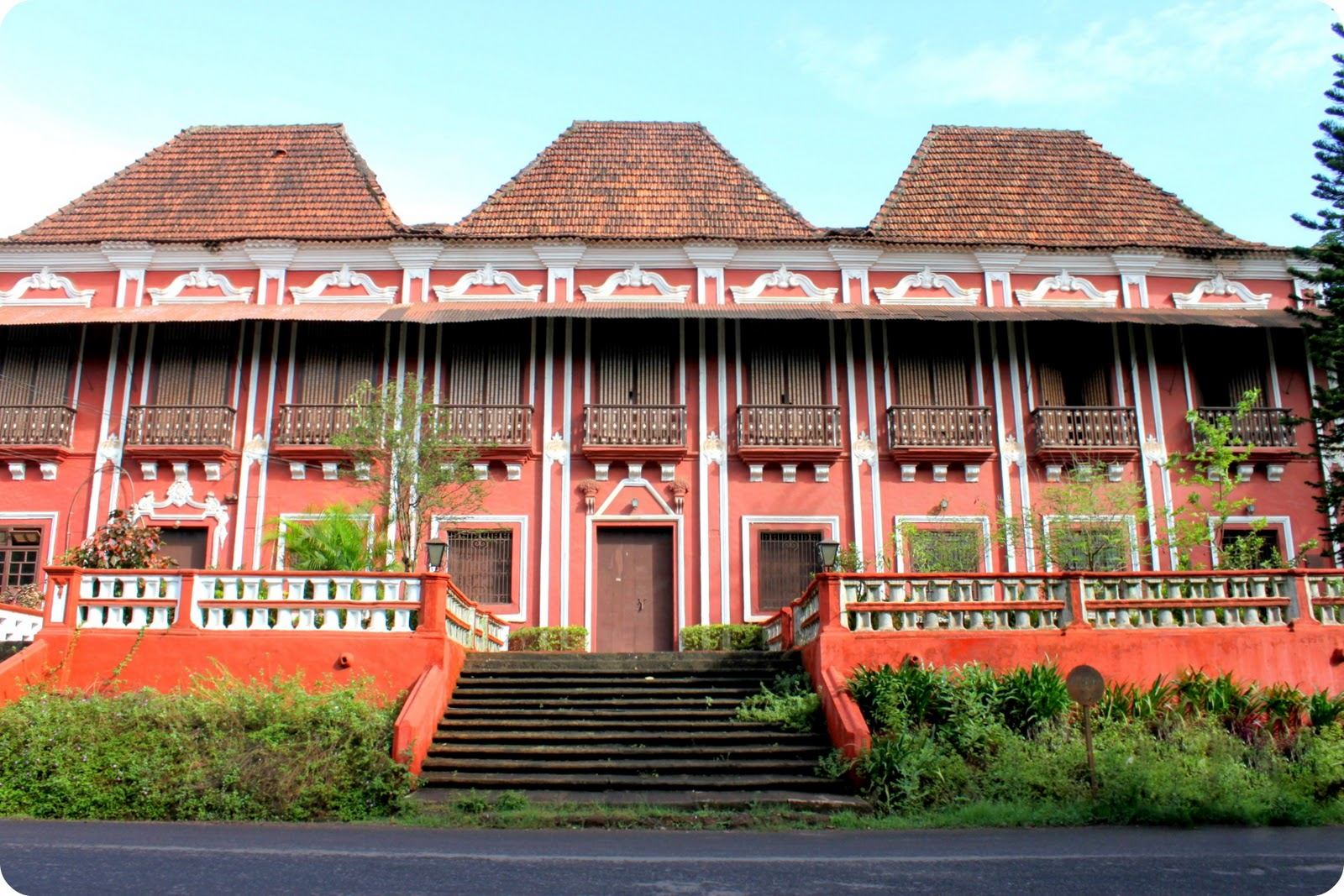
A Goan-Portuguese noble house in Margao

Most Goan houses standing today were built between the 18th century and the early part of the 20th century. They display a mix of neo-Classic and neo-Gothic styles.

== Design influences ==
The following factors affected house design in Goa:

- Protecting oneself from the fierce monsoon was the basis of architectural form.
- The architectural style of Portuguese-built churches.

== Exteriors ==
The traditional pre-Portuguese homes were inward-looking with small windows; this reflected the secluded role of women. The houses opened into courtyards, and rarely opened onto streets. The Catholic houses built or refurbished between the middle of the 18th and the 20th centuries were more outward-looking and ornamental, with balcões (covered porches) and verandas facing the street. The large balcões had built-in seating, open to the street, where men and women could sit together and ‘see and be seen’, chat with their neighbours, or just enjoy the evening breeze. These balcões are bordered by ornamental columns that sometimes continued along the steps and added to the stature of the house. This, together with the plinth, which usually indicated the status of the owners. The houses of rich landlords had high plinths with grand staircases leading to the front door or balcão.

Large ornamental windows with stucco mouldings open onto verandas. These may appear purely decorative, but have their origins in similar mouldings in the windows of Portuguese houses. There these elements of style were devices to help sailors identify their homes at a distance as they sailed in. The design is therefore an import but serves a similar purpose in Goa: to help construct the identity of the home. Windows gradually became more decorative, ornate, and expressive.

Front doors were flanked by columns or pilasters.

Railings were the most intricate embellishment in a Goan house. Pillars, piers, and colours do not seem to be influenced by any style in particular; rather they conform to a rather mixed bag of architectural styles.

=== Cornices ===
Country tiles used as a corbel are a feature peculiar to Goa. The effect achieved is aesthetically pleasing, giving the roof projection a solid, moulded appearance.

=== Gateposts and Compound walls ===
Gateways consisted of elaborately carved compound walls on either side of the gate posts.

=== Use of colour ===
Dramatic and startling colour—initially achieved with vegetable and natural dyes—plays an important role in Goan architecture. Colour was decorative and used purely to create a sensation. With a colour wash, the house looked "dressed" and therefore displayed the economic well-being of the family that lived in it. Here art in architecture performed a social function. However, this was not completely a matter of individual choice, since during Portuguese rule the owner of the house could be fined if his house was not painted.

The walls were made of mud and then later of laterite stone; they were usually plastered then painted. Very few buildings are coloured exactly alike and solid colours are used for front facades; interiors are usually in paler colours/white with solid color highlights.

This rendering or piping in white is the result of the unwritten rule during the Portuguese occupation of Goa that no private house or building could be painted in white. Only churches and chapels enjoyed this privilege. It is understandable that Goan Christians followed this rule, as white was associated with the Virgin Mary and therefore the virtues of purity and chastity (both desirable in Goa), but, surprisingly, Goan Hindus also respected this practice. As a result of this code, an interesting and aesthetically pleasing trend developed, as competition among neighbours gave impetus to variety.

== Interiors ==
Most houses are symmetrical with the entrance door occupying the place of honour. Typically this front door leads to a foyer which then either leads to the sala (the main hall for entertaining a large number of guests) or the sala de visita (a smaller hall for entertaining a small number of guests) and in some cases the chapel in the house. From here one can also directly enter the rest of the house, which usually revolved around a courtyard. Typically the master bedroom opens into the sala or is close to it. The dining room is usually perpendicular to these rooms; the bedrooms flank the courtyard, and the kitchens and service areas are at the rear of the house. In the case of two-story houses, a staircase, either from the foyer or the dining room, leads to more bedrooms.

Consisting of humble burnt earth plastered over with cow dung and hay, or with elaborate patterns made with tiles imported from Europe, the floors in Goan houses have been both workplaces and statements.

Almost all Goan houses have a false ceiling of wood.

== Goan Hindu houses ==
The Goan Hindu Architectural style is different from the Portuguese-influenced style. Hindu houses have little colonial influence. Most of the big houses have a courtyard called as Rajangan in Konkani where a Tulasi Vrindavan is seen. A special place called a Soppo is often used for relaxing. Goan traditional Hindu houses have the following features:

- Angan (courtyard with a Tulasi Vrundavan)
- Rajangan (a courtyard inside the house)
- Deva kood (a place for daily prayer and other rituals)
- Saal (a hall)
- Raanchi kood (a kitchen with a door which is called Magil daar)
- A room special meant for pregnant and nursing mothers.
- Kothar (store room)
- A hall specially meant for celebrating Ganeshotsav
