= Ovi (music) =

Wedding songs in Goa, India

Ovi are wedding songs in Goa, India, sung during the chuddo ceremony, during which bangles are worn by the bride, and the sado ceremony, during which the red sado is stitched by a tailor.

== See also ==
- Deknni
- Mando
- Ver (music)
