= Public squares in Goa =

Church square and immediate surroundings

The public square of a community in Goa (especially in Salcette) is the church square and its immediate surroundings. This space is usually at the evolutionary center of the community and occupies an important place in its spatial hierarchy. These squares originated in the sixteenth century AD with the Portuguese conquest of Goa, which brought new planning concepts and substantially changed the meaning of the existing space. These squares have evolved over the years into a type of their own.

== Principal public squares ==
Square in Curtorim

Wherever churches exist in a Goan community—whether urban or rural—that has a predominantly Roman Catholic population, the commercial, residential, and administrative functions revolve around the church square, making the space around the church the principal public square. These squares have evolved as a fusion of the traditional systems of pre-Portuguese Goa and the design of squares developed in post–medieval Europe prior to the colonization of Goa.

=== Public spaces in pre-Portuguese Goa and post-medieval Portugal ===
Until the advent of the Portuguese in AD 1510, public spaces in Goa consisted of market squares and sometimes temple squares. The Portuguese brought the well-defined concept of urban spaces. They did not alter the basic structure of Goan public spaces, but instead brought new planning concepts and substantially changed the meaning of the existing space.

In pre-Portuguese Goa, the temple was often somewhat separated from the village, and since Hinduism requires private prayer, there was usually no open space in front or near the temple. The governing body for the village (the gavkari), of which temple priests were members, met at the temple, or next to it, often under a tree. The only public space in a village was the market, usually located away from the temple, as there fish and other "unholy" things were sold.

In Portugal, however, a church was always an enclosed structure that opened frontally into an open church square surrounded by residences (one motivation for this was that no one could be arrested on church grounds), and governmental buildings, because of the church's connection to the politics of the day. Commercial activity also took place in the church square.

In both places the public square was a place of education. In Portugal most teaching was carried out by the clergy. In Goa the Brahmin priests were the educated class, and they schooled children in the temple premises.

=== Public squares in Goa after the Portuguese conquest ===
Goan public squares are centrally located, at the intersection of roads coming from various parts of the village.

The development of a public square typically progressed according to the following order:

1. The first element to appear was the church with its square, which the Portuguese tried to reproduce according to the European model. This was the main activity generator around which all the other subsequent functions appeared.
2. The Communidade (administrative building) was the next to appear.
3. The most prominent families started building their residences around the church square.
4. With the church also came the school, which was run by the clergy.
5. These functions, especially the religious, generated a lot of activity, resulting in the appearance of commercial activity (mainly the market).

These spaces have evolved over the past 400 years, becoming a public space used by the community.

Communities increased in scale and size, and, in the twentieth century, the administrative functions were displaced (as in the case of Margão).

==== Scale ====
In the region of Salcette, the ratio of length to breadth of the church square varies from 2:3 in villages, to 2:5 in cities. The height to width ratio of 1:4 is a very pleasing scale, giving a sense of spatial enclosure. When the ratio gets larger, as in Curtorim (1:7), this sense of spatial enclosure is felt only at the edges of the square.

Somewhat narrower squares, with length to breadth ratio of around 1:4, encourage public activity more readily than do than the wider squares. Linear spaces become circulation spaces: the closer the visual contact the greater the social contact.

==== Other architectural details ====
Various types of openings and projections give a square character and variety. Doors, windows, and balconies opening into the square give it character while making it more accessible, thus encouraging its use for recreation. The squares therefore are vibrant places with a wide variety of colours.

The church squares consist of compound walls, roads, piazza crosses, crosses, bandstands, and landscapes which all combine to define the space. The majority of church squares in Goa have not undergone a significant change in social meaning since the end of Portuguese rule. The principal commercial area is continuing to expand. Due to the increase in vehicle traffic, elements such as compound walls have appeared, segregating the church square from the remaining functions.
