= Mission Rabies =

Rabies prevention program

- Founded: 2013
- Type: International non-governmental organisation
- Headquarters: Cranborne, UK
- Region served: Worldwide
- Key people: Luke Gamble
- Website: http://www.missionrabies.com

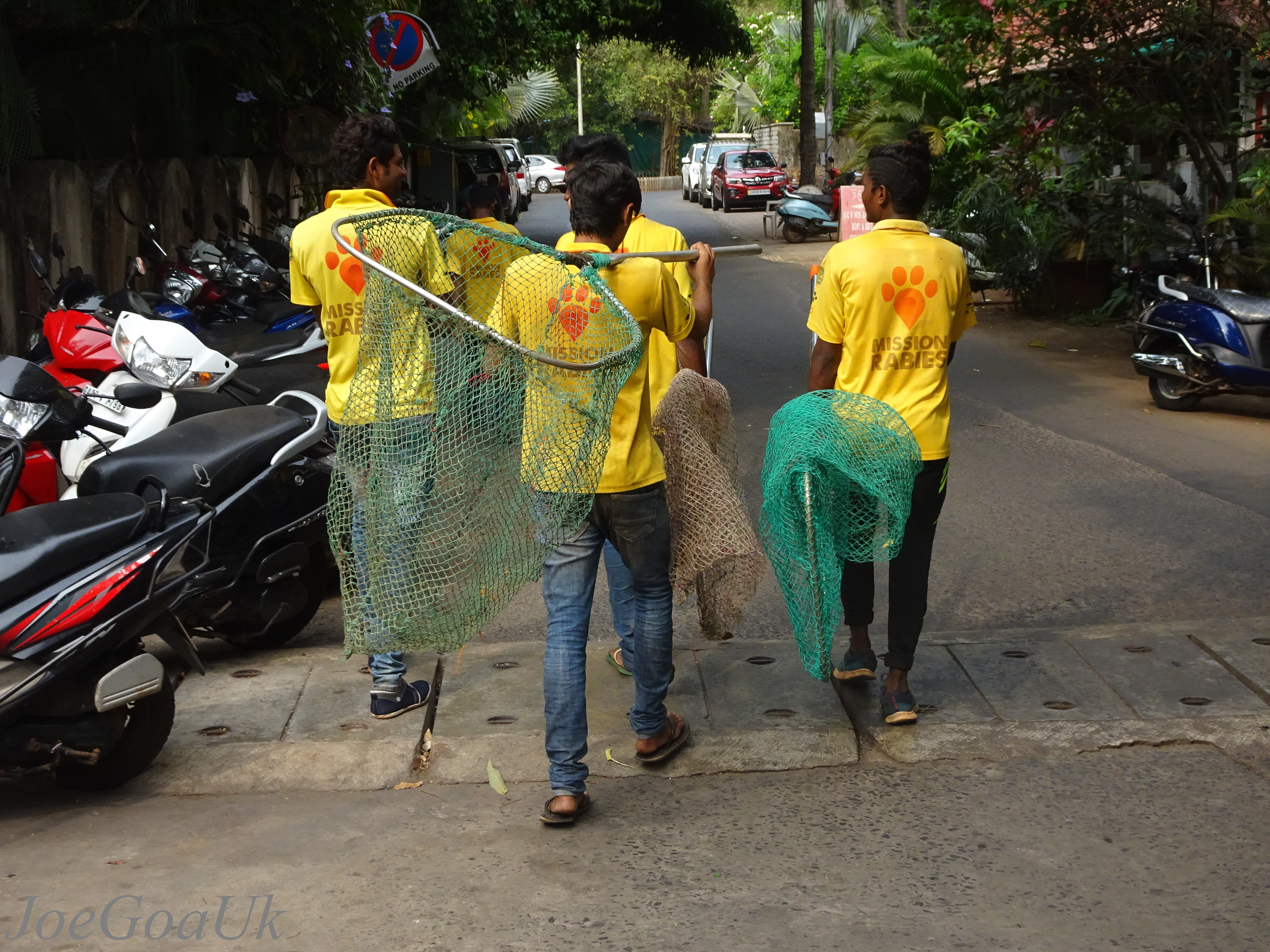
Mission Rabies members come to catch stray dogs with nets

Mission Rabies is a programme of Worldwide Veterinary Service (WVS), a United Kingdom-based charity that assists animals. Mission Rabies has a One Health approach driven by research to eliminate dog bite transmitted rabies (a disease that is estimated to kill 59,000 people annually). Launched in September 2013 with a mission to vaccinate 50,000 dogs against rabies across India, Mission Rabies teams have since then vaccinated over 4,000,000 dogs and educated 8,000,000 children in dog bite prevention in rabies endemic countries.

== Geographic scope ==
The organisation has worked in India in locations such as Kerala, Tamil Nadu, Andhra Pradesh, Maharashtra, Orissa, West Bengal, Jharkhand, Rajasthan, Goa and Assam. It also works in Cambodia, Malawi, Mozambique, Uganda and Thailand.

== Mission Rabies Cambodia ==
In 2024, Mission Rabies led Asia’s largest rabies vaccination campaign. During a two-week mission, 229,488 dogs were vaccinated across Cambodia. This campaign was implemented by WVS Cambodia.
