= List of cities in Goa by population =

This is a list of cities and towns in Goa. Goa /ˈɡoʊ.ə/ is a state located in the south-western region of India; It is India's smallest state by area and the fourth smallest by population. Goa is one of India's richest states with a GDP per capita two and a half times that of the country. It was ranked the best placed state by the Eleventh Finance Commission for its infrastructure and ranked on top for the best quality of life in India by the National Commission on Population based on the 12 Indicators.

Panaji is the state capital of Goa. Vasco da Gama is the largest city. Margao is the commercial and cultural capital of the state. Goa still exhibits the religious and cultural influence of the Portuguese, who ruled Goa from 1510 to 1961.

== Subdivisions ==
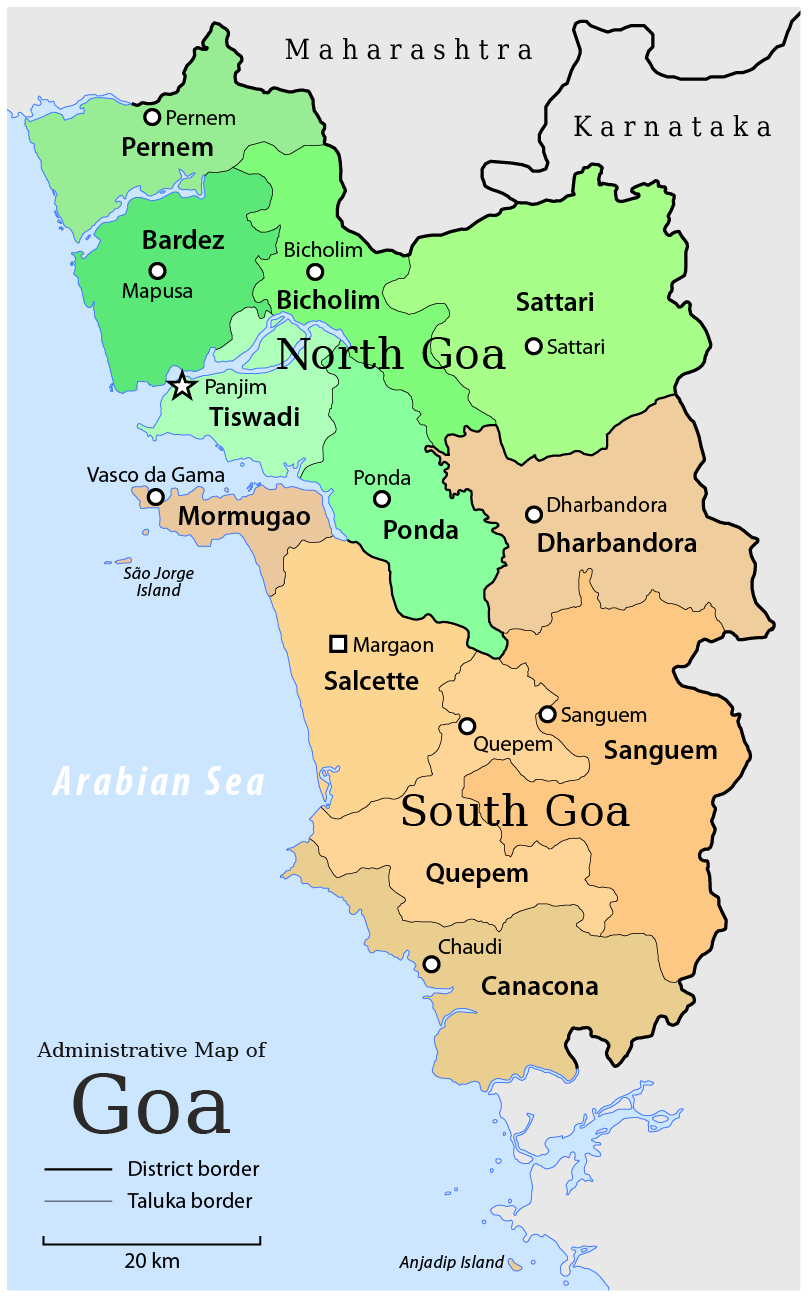
Talukas of Goa. Talukas in green shades belong to North Goa district, and orange denote South Goa district.

The state is divided into two districts: North Goa district and South Goa district. Each district is administered by a district collector, appointed by the Indian government.

Panaji is the headquarters of North Goa district and is also the capital of Goa.

North Goa is further divided into three subdivisions – Panaji, Mapusa, and Bicholim; and five taluks – Tiswadi taluka (Panaji), Bardez taluka (Mapusa), Pernem, Bicholim, and Sattari taluka (Valpoi), (note = the letter m is silent at the end of every place/city/taluka)

Margao is the headquarters of South Goa district.

South Goa is further divided into five subdivisions – Ponda, Mormugao (Vasco da Gama), Margao, Quepem, and Dharbandora taluka; and seven taluks – Ponda taluka, Mormugao, Salcete taluka (Margao), Quepem, and Canacona (Chaudi), Sanguem, and Dharbandora taluka. (Ponda Taluka shifted from North Goa to South Goa in January 2015). (note = the letter m is silent at the end of every place/city/taluka)

Goa's major cities include Vasco da Gama, Margao, Panaji, Mapusa and Ponda.

Panaji is the only Municipal Corporation in Goa. There are thirteen Municipal Councils: Margao, Mormugao (including Vasco da Gama), Pernem, Mapusa, Bicholim, Sanquelim, Valpoi, Ponda, Cuncolim, Quepem, Curchorem, Sanguem, and Canacona.

(note = the letter m is silent at the end of ever place/city/taluka)

== Cities in Goa ==
†	Capital City

Name	Type	Category	Taluka	Population (2011)	Land area		District
Name	Type	Category	Taluka	Population (2011)	km^{2}	mi^{2}	District
Bicholim	City	Municipal Council	Bicholim	16986	14.50	5.60	North Goa
Canacona	City	Municipal Council	Canacona	12434	18.70	7.22	South Goa
Cuncolim	City	Municipal Council	Salcete	16623	28.70	11.08	South Goa
Curchorem	City	Municipal Council	Quepem	22730	22.60	8.73	South Goa
Mapusa	City	Municipal Council	Bardez	40487	11.32	4.37	North Goa
Margao	City	Municipal Council	Salcete	87650	21.10	8.15	South Goa
Mormugao	City	Municipal Council	Mormugao	94393	27.36	10.56	South Goa
Panaji†	City	Municipal Corporation	Tiswadi	40017	08.10	3.13	North Goa
Pernem	City	Municipal Council	Pernem	5289	15.94	6.15	North Goa
Ponda	City	Municipal Council	Ponda	22664	5.20	2.01	South Goa
Quepem	City	Municipal Council	Quepem	14795	19.70	7.61	South Goa
Sanguem	City	Municipal Council	Sanguem	6444	4.90	1.89	South Goa
Sanquelim	City	Municipal Council	Bicholim	13651	14.70	5.68	North Goa
Valpoi	City	Municipal Council	Sattari	8532	11.70	4.52	North Goa

== Urban agglomerations in Goa ==
†	Capital City

Name	UA Type	Taluka	Population (2011)	Land area		UA has following cities & town under it.
Name	UA Type	Taluka	Population (2011)	km^{2}	mi^{2}	UA has following cities & town under it.
Margao UA	Class I UAs/Towns	Salcete taluka	106484	24.1	9.3	Margao(M.CI), Aquem, Navelim
Mormugao UA	Class I UAs/Towns	Mormugao	101326	39.55	15.27	Mormugao(M CI), Chicalim
Panaji UA†	Class I UAs/Towns	Tiswadi taluka	114759	75	29	Panaji(M Corp.), Taleigao, Durgawado, Morambi-O-Grande, Cujira, Panelim, Morambi-O-Pequeno, Bambolim, Calapor, Chimbel, Murda
