= Sonsogor =

Mountain peak in India

- Location within Goa

Highest point
- Elevation: 1,026 m (3,366 ft)
- Coordinates: 15°31′21.52″N 74°16′42.23″E

Geography
- Location: Border of Sattari Taluk, North Goa district, Goa / Khanapur Taluk, Belagavi district and Joida taluk, Uttara Kannada district, Karnataka, India
- Parent range: Western Ghats

Climbing
- Easiest route: Hike

Sonsogor, or Sonsogod, is the highest peak in the state of Goa, India, at an elevation of 1,026 metres (3,366 feet) above sea level.

It is located at the trijunction of Sattari taluka, North Goa district and Khanapur taluka, Belagavi district, and Joida taluka, Uttara Kannada district, Karnataka state, It is a part of the Western Ghats mountain range in Goa's Mhadei Wildlife Sanctuary.

In July 2023, the Goa Tourism Development Corporation (GTDC) has started a Monsoon trekking programme including, Sonsogor Trek, inviting tourists with a tag line, 'Go the Top of Goa'. It is a two to three hour trek.
