= Goa Broad Band Network =

GBBN
- Website type: State Wide Area Network
- Owner: Government of Goa
- Website: https://www.goa.gov.in
- Commercial: No
- Launched: August 2009
- Current status: Online

The Department of Information Technology, Government of Goa has initiated and implemented a State Wide Area Network under the brand name “Goa Broadband Network” (GBBN), connecting all 12 Talukas, 189 Village Panchayats, 225 office buildings/termination points, around 1200 Government offices/sub offices/corporations/autonomous bodies/Municipalities, and around 500+ schools/colleges/educational institutes through a fiber network throughout the State of Goa. This is an initiative and the state is the only one in India to have such a fiber based network. The network will be used for communicating between the G2G, G2B, G2C, and other Government departments. The network’s potential will also be used for a broader range of applications including social usage such as e-learning. Goa will be the first state to have an IP based architecture, with GBBN supporting voice, video and data. This is an end-to-end IP network, which carries data, phone calls as well as video conferences on the same converged infrastructure.
