= Recognition of same-sex unions in Goa =

Goa does not recognise same-sex marriages or civil unions. However, live-in relationships are not unlawful in Goa. The Indian Supreme Court has held that adults have a constitutional right to live together without being married, and that police cannot interfere with consenting adults living together. The Bombay High Court upheld this constitutional right in July 2023. In August 2025, a same-sex couple filed a writ petition with the High Court, arguing that tax provisions resulted in unequal economic treatment for same-sex couples and sought inclusion under the term "spouse" for tax benefits under the Income Tax Act.

== Legal history ==
=== Background ===
Marriage in India is governed under several federal laws. These laws allow for the solemnisation of marriages according to different religions, notably Hinduism, Jainism, Buddhism, Christianity, Islam, Sikhism and Zoroastrianism. Every citizen has the right to choose which law will apply to them based on their community or religion. These laws are the Hindu Marriage Act, 1955, the Indian Christian Marriage Act, 1872, the Muslim Personal Law (Shariat) Application Act, 1937, the Anand Marriage Act, 1909 and the Parsi Marriage and Divorce Act, 1936. The Special Marriage Act, 1954 (SMA; Konkani: विशेष लग्न कायदो, १९५४, Viśeṣ Lagn Kāydo; Marathi: विशेष विवाह कायदा, १९५४, Viśeṣ Vivāh Kāydā) allows civil marriage officers to solemnize and register marriages for all Indian citizens regardless of the religion of either party. Although the vast majority of marriages in India continue to be solemnized and registered under the traditional religious personal laws, the SMA has become popular among interfaith couples, inter-caste couples, and spouses with no religious beliefs. None of these acts explicitly bans same-sex marriage.

On 14 February 2006, the Supreme Court of India ruled in Smt. Seema v. Ashwani Kumar that the states and union territories are obliged to register all marriages performed under the federal laws. The court's ruling was expected to reduce instances of child marriages, bigamy, cases of domestic violence and unlawful abandonment. Goa is one of a few states to have enacted a unified marriage law, dating from the Portuguese era. Every citizen is bound to the same law regardless of their religion. However, article 1056 of the Goa Civil Code, largely based on Portuguese civil law, states that: "Marriage is a perpetual contract made between two persons of different sex with the purpose of legitimately constituting a family". (Note: Portuguese: O casamento é um contrato perpetuo feito entre duas pessoas de sexo differente, com o fim de constituirem legitimamente a familia.) Article 1058, which lists forbidden marriages such as marriages to relatives or to individuals under the marriageable age, does not explicitly address marriages between people of the same sex.

Traditional Konkani marriages (लग्न, lagn) are deeply rooted in custom and hold significant cultural importance. They involve elaborate pre-wedding preparations and culminate in key rituals, including the tying of the mangala sutra and the saptapadi, though Christian communities in Goa have distinct wedding rituals. Arranged marriage remains the prevailing norm across India, accounting for the vast majority of unions, and often placing pressure on LGBT individuals to marry partners of the opposite sex. Nevertheless, some same-sex couples have participated in traditional marriage ceremonies, although the marriages lack legal status in Goa. Designer Wendell Rodricks and his French partner, Jerome Marrel, entered into a civil solidarity pact (PACS), a French civil union scheme, in 2002. Although registered in France, the media reported it as "India's first gay marriage". Rodricks later stated that the evening of the signing of the PACS 8 "scruffy-looking men" came to the couple's house in Colvale. Although he anticipated trouble, the men instead said "Landlord, you are getting married and not buying us a round of drinks?" Scroll.in reported this history in 2022 as an "early sign" on how Goans would "overcome prejudice to open [their] arms to the queer community". In 2006, a local LGBT advocacy group stated that in the past two years they had conducted 25 same-sex marriages. "Fearing social stigma and discrimination, we had to conduct all these marriages in a clandestine manner", said a spokesman for the group. In 2022, a lesbian couple, Dr. Paromita Mukherjee and Dr. Surabhi Mitra, originally from Maharashtra, had a "big, fat, sea-side destination wedding" in Goa. The couple went public with the news of their wedding. Mukherjee said, "We are over the moon with the love we are garnering. Somewhere we knew that the society and its aware people will celebrate our love with us."

=== Live-in relationships ===
Recognition of same-sex unions in India

Live-in relationships (Konkani: सहवास संबंध, sahvās sambandh, pronounced [ˈsɵɦʋɑːs ˈsɵmbɵ̃nd̪ʱ], or लाइव-इन रिलेशनशिप, lāiv-in rileśanaśip; Marathi: सहवास संबंध, sahvāsa sambandha) are not illegal in Goa. The Indian Supreme Court has held that adults have a constitutional right to live together without being married, that police cannot interfere with consenting adults living together, and that live-in relationships are not unlawful. State courts have upheld this constitutional right, and further ruled that if a couple faces threats from family or the community they may request police protection. However, live-in relationships do not confer all the legal rights and benefits of marriage. In July 2023, the Bombay High Court—which has jurisdiction over Goa—ruled that same-sex live-in relationships are not unlawful. Judges Revati Mohite Dere and Gauri Godse ordered the police to provide security to two women who had chosen to live together against the wishes of one of their parents. Same-sex couples remain in a legal grey zone. While they may live together and seek police protection if necessary, they lack many of the rights, obligations, responsibilities and security of marriage.

In August 2025, a same-sex couple, Payio Ashiho and Vivek Divan, filed a writ petition, arguing that tax provisions resulted in unequal economic treatment for same-sex couples and sought inclusion under the term "spouse" for tax benefits under the Income Tax Act. In November 2025, the Bombay High Court refused interim relief in Payio Ashiho v. Union of India. The federal Income Tax Department argued that their relationship could not be recognised as a "marriage" under the Income Tax Act as "it was not similarly recognised under any marriage law in India". Further proceedings were held on 10 December 2025 and 9 July 2026.

=== Transgender and intersex issues ===
Goa historically did not recognize a traditional third gender community known as hijra (हिज़्दो, hizdo), who hold respected community roles in North India and are known for their distinct culture, communities led by gurus, and traditional roles as performers. While gender fluidity, eunuchs, and transgender people were present in Goa, this never developed into an organised hijra structure and was further suppressed under Portuguese colonial rule, especially during the Goa Inquisition. The Supreme Court's 2023 ruling in Supriyo v. Union of India held that the Indian Constitution does not require the legalisation of same-sex marriages but affirmed that transgender people may marry opposite-sex partners.

== See also ==
- LGBT rights in India
- LGBT rights in Goa
- Recognition of same-sex unions in India
- Supriyo v. Union of India
