= Susegad =

Concept associated with the culture from the state of Goa, India

Susegad is a concept associated with the culture from the state of Goa, India. Derived from the Portuguese word sossegado ('quiet'), it is often viewed as the relaxed, laid-back attitude towards life that is said to have existed historically in the former Portuguese territory. Footprint Travel Guides describes it as "a relaxed attitude and enjoyment of life to the fullest". Susegad actually means, according to most experts, is a contented form of joie de vivre existent in the state. As described by one Sunday Times writer, Goa is "South Asia's Latin Quarter: indulgent, tolerant, capricious, steeped in a tropical lassitude and wedded to the sea". As a traditionally agrarian society reliant on collective labour, Goa's strong civic ties and bonds have contributed to the development of the concept.

The concept may also carry negative connotations such as "indolence" and in recent years it has been suggested that the relaxed Goan culture of susegad has given way in the face of modern stresses. In addition, it is an example of what some ethnographers point out—i.e., "tourism representations of the Orient as the west's exotic, timeless and authentic pleasure periphery are embedded with a colonial discourse that perpetuates the west's hegemonic exploitation of the Orient".
