= Siege of Santhome =

Military campaign lead in 1558

Vijayanagara Invasion of Goa
- Part of Vijayanagar-Portuguese Conflicts
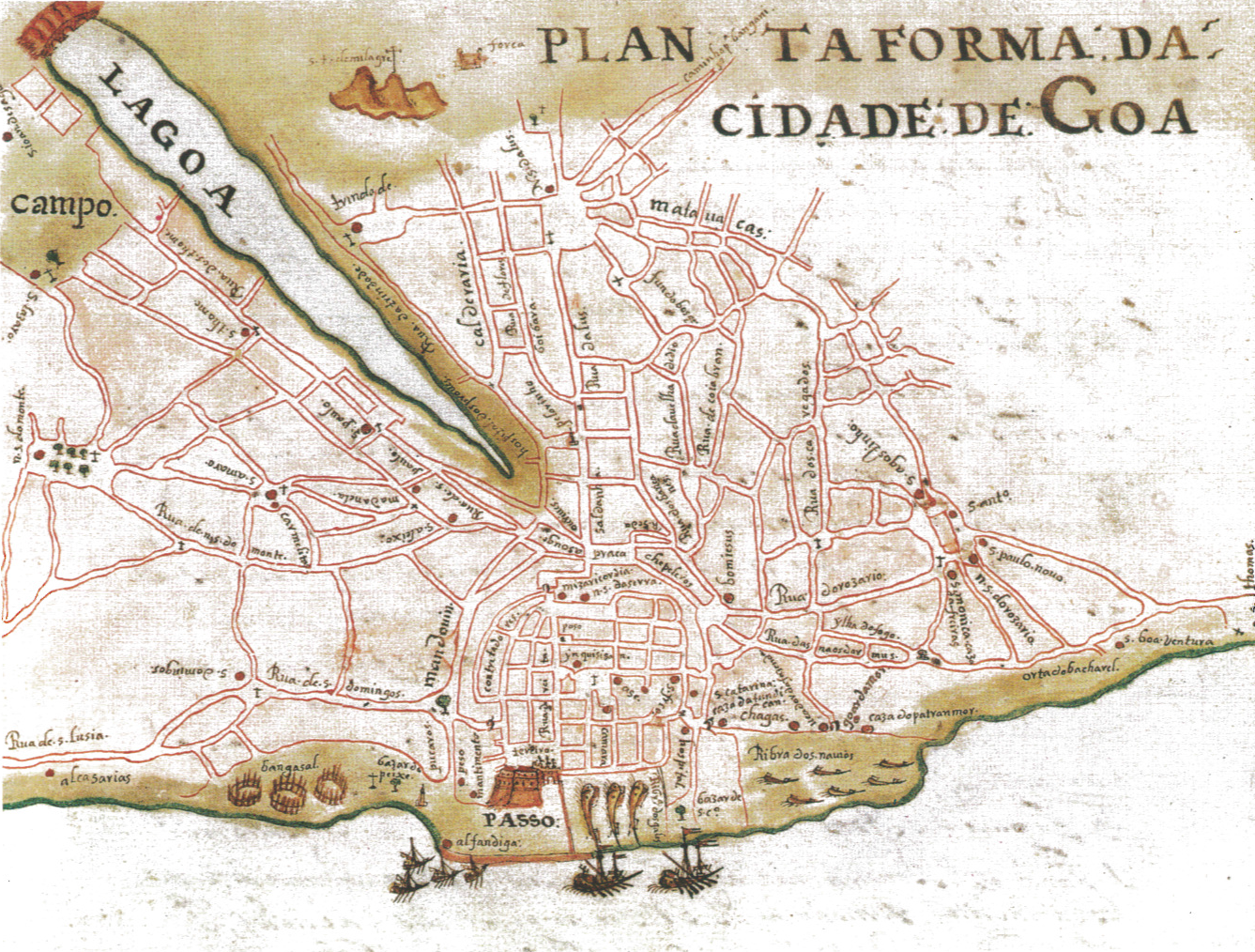
- Map of Portuguese Goa (1620)
Date	1558
Location	Goa, India
Result	Vijayanagara victory: End of Portuguese attacks on Vijayanagara Empire

Belligerents
Vijayanagara Empire: Keladi Nayakas	Portuguese Empire

Commanders and leaders
Vitthala Raja; Dodda Sankanna Nayaka	(Portuguese Empire) Francisco Barreto

Strength
Vijayanagara Army : 100,000 Infantry; 10,000 Cavalry; 100 War Elephants; Unknown Number of Artillery; Keladi Army : 20,000 Infantry; 1,000 Cavalry; 50 War Elephants	Unknown

The siege of Santhome (1558), or Vijayanagara invasion of Goa, was a military campaign led by Rama Raya of Vijayanagara against the Portuguese settlement of Santhome of Mylapore. It followed years of growing tensions between the two powers. Relations had worsened because of Portuguese raids on coastal towns, attacks on local rulers, and interference in trade. To carry out his plan, Rama Raya sent a large force under Rama Raja Vitthala and Dodda Sankanna Nayaka to threaten Goa, while he led the main army against Santhome of Mylapore. The pressure on Goa prevented the Portuguese from sending reinforcements allowing the Vijayanagara forces to capture Santhome. Portuguese records provide limited details, Indian sources suggest that Rama Raya’s forces, numbering around 500,000 troops, surrounded the city while a separate Vijayanagara contingent besieged Goa to prevent reinforcements. The Portuguese opted for negotiation over resistance. A ransom of 100,000 pagodas was imposed, and five leading citizens were taken hostage until full payment was made.

== Background ==
=== Portuguese Attacks on Vijaynagara Domains ===
The Franciscan Friars, who had been present in Santhome and Negapatam from the outset, were responsible for the desecration of several Hindu temples and the destruction of idols, replacing them with Christian churches and chapels. By 1542, they had constructed two churches in Negapatam one dedicated to St. Francis and the other to Nossa Senhora da Saude leading to the conversion of around three thousand people to Catholicism. In other regions under Portuguese influence, Hindu temples and places of worship were often attacked, looted, or forced to pay tribute. Some missionary groups also used pressure to convert local people, while others took men, women, and children into slavery.

Shortly after, the Jesuits arrived and continued the Franciscans’ efforts, further expanding missionary activities.

=== Sack of Mangalore ===
In 1555, the Portuguese captain Álvaro da Silveira attacked Mangalore where temples were looted and destroyed during the raid. Such actions often frightened local people, causing many families to leave Portuguese controlled areas and abandon their homes and belongings. The Portuguese also demanded heavy payments from Indian rulers and tightly controlled trade forcing merchants to use Portuguese ports and follow their rules. The Brahmins deeply concerned about these actions, brought the matter to the attention of the Regent of the Vijayanagara Empire. However, he refrained from taking any action against the Portuguese probably because of the need to uphold favorable ties with them, especially to ensure a consistent supply of warhorses, which were vital for the empire’s military campaigns.

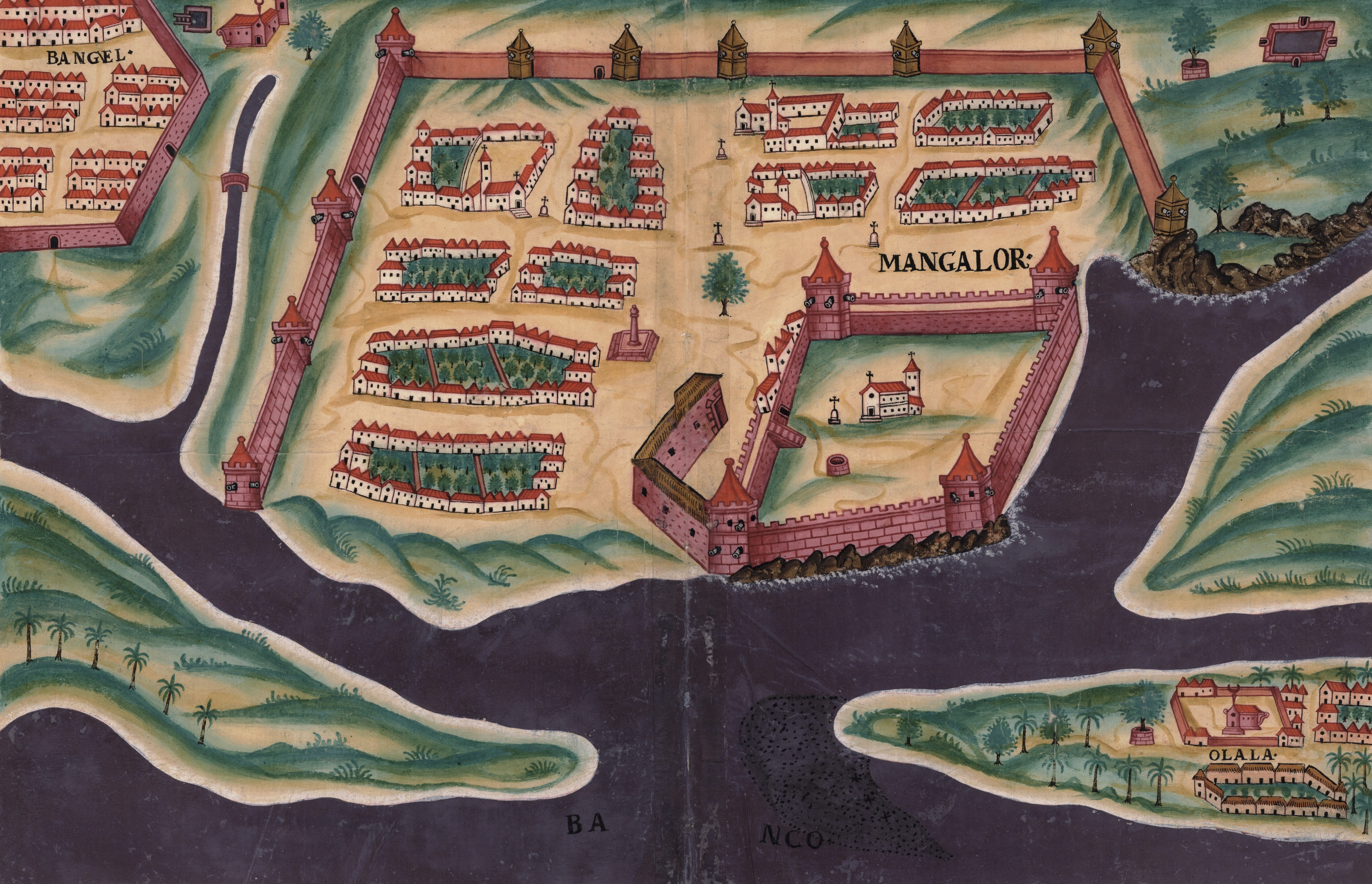
Portuguese Fortress of Mangalore

=== Second Sack of Mangalore ===
After the defeat of the forces allied with Adil Shah at Salsette in 1557, Rama Raya began to see the Portuguese as a growing threat to his influence. The situation became worsen in early 1558 when the Portuguese captain Luiz Mello da Silva attacked Mangalore claiming that Muslim merchants had taken refuge there. The assault resulted in many people being killed or taken into slavery. Since Mangalore lay within Vijayanagara's domain Rama Raya viewed the attack as a direct challenge to his authority.

== Planning ==
In the early summer of 1558, Rama Raya carefully planned his military campaign, organizing his forces into two divisions. One was placed under his direct command, while the other was entrusted to his cousin, Rama Raya Vitthala, a seasoned warrior who had proven his abilities in the conflicts against Travancore in 1544 and the Pandyas in 1549. Vitthala marched towards Goa with about hundred thousand infantry, ten thousand cavalry, hundred elephants, and a small artillery train. He was joined by the Keladi ruler Dodda Sankanna Nayaka who brought an additional force of around twenty thousand infantry, thousand cavalry, and fifty elephants. Their combined army was tasked with advancing on Goa from the south where Portuguese defenses were considered most vulnerable. The campaign was launched at a favorable moment as many Portuguese fleets were away on overseas voyages and Viceroy Francisco Barreto had little reason to expect an attack from Vijayanagara a state long regarded as a valuable ally. Together, their mission was to march toward Goa focusing their attack on its vulnerable southern approach.

Rama Raya personally led the main army reportedly numbering around five hundred thousand troops against Santhome of Mylapore on the eastern coast. The choice of target appears to have been deliberate. Santhome held great religious and symbolic importance for the Portuguese. At the same time with Portuguese forces tied down by the siege of Goa, Mylapore was left exposed and could expect little support.

During the first half of the year, Portuguese fleets were occupied in their long voyages across the Atlantic and Indian Oceans, leaving their territories vulnerable. Viceroy Francisco Barreto, who governed from 1555 to 1558, had no reason to anticipate an attack from Vijayanagara, an ally of the Portuguese. However, this attack was only a diversion. While Vitthala Nayaka led a siege on Goa Rama Raya commanded the main force, a massive army of nearly 500,000 troops, in a direct assault on Santhome of Mylapore. Santhome was of great religious importance to the Portuguese making its conquest highly symbolic. Moreover, with Portuguese forces in Goa occupied by Vitthala Nayaka's offensive, no reinforcements could be dispatched to defend Mylapore.

== Expedition ==
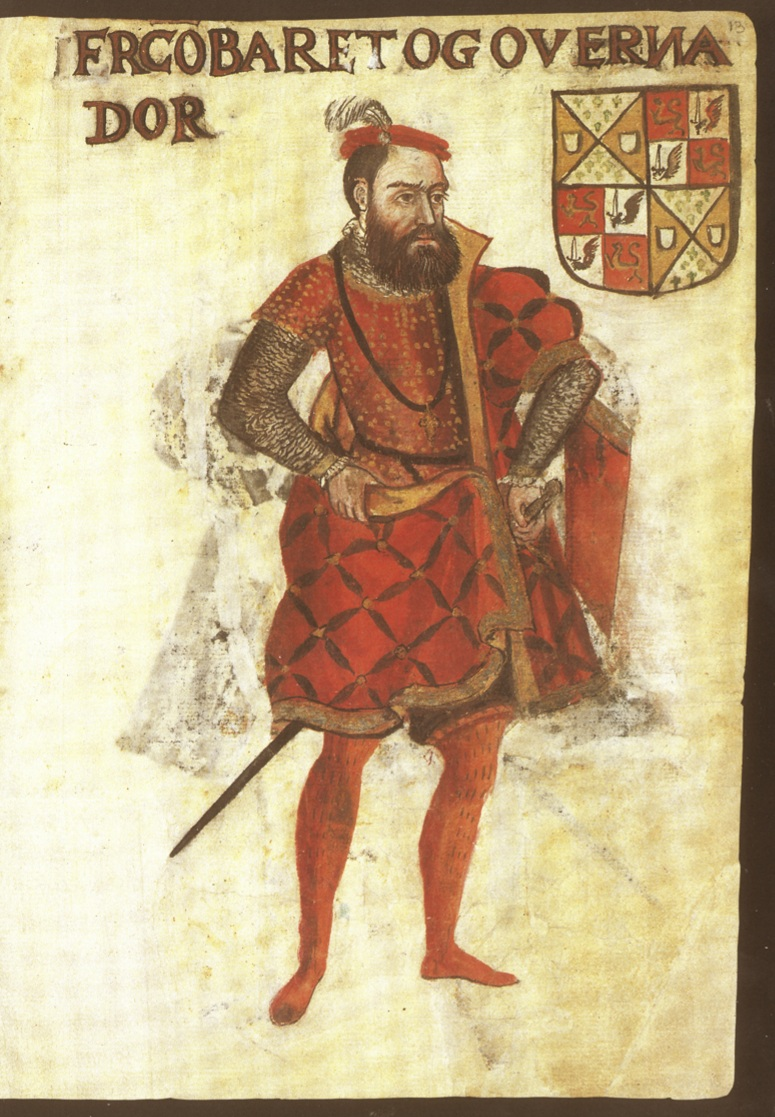
Francisco Barreto

Portuguese chroniclers like Da Couto and Faria y Sousa mention only the campaign against Santhome claiming that a Portuguese renegade convinced Rama Raya to launch the attack, aiming to capture its vast riches, estimated at over 2,000,000 gold pagodas. However, the identity of this traitor remains unknown. With an army of half a million soldiers and a formidable artillery force, Rama Raya advanced toward the city. News of his approach caused panic among the settlers, This led the city’s leaders to gather for a council to decide their course of action. Among them, a merchant named Pero da Taide Inferno advocated for armed resistance against the attack. Others believed that resistance was futile and instead recommended negotiating a settlement.

Pero da Taide, refusing to support negotiations, departed Santhome on a ship bound for Bengal. To appease Rama Raya four prominent citizens of the city presented him with a gift worth 4,000 cruzados, though its exact details remain unknown. The city itself was lavishly adorned with flowers and fine cloth to welcome the regent. However, instead of entering Rama Raya established his camp outside and ordered his captains to gather all residents, regardless of age or status, and detain them without harm. The city’s wealth was then presented before him, but it amounted to only 100,000 pardaos far less than expected. Enraged at the deception, he had the renegade executed by trampling under an elephant. He then agreed to release the captives in exchange for a ransom of 100,000 pagodas, with half payable immediately and the rest within six months. To ensure Obedience, he took five prominent citizens as hostages but ordered all confiscated property to be returned to its rightful owners. A notable incident occurred when a silver spoon was reported missing from a house after inquiries the Vijayanagara captains ensured its return. Satisfied with the outcome, Rama Raya returned to his capital and later released the hostages pleased with their conduct.

Santhome of Mylapore eventually surrendered to the Vijayanagara army after it became clear that no Portuguese reinforcements would arrive from Goa. The Portuguese authorities were unable to send help because their forces were occupied by the campaign of Vitthala Raja and Dodda Sankanna Nayaka in the west. Some later Indian works such as the Shivatattvaratnakara and Keladi Nripa Vijayam claim that Vijayanagara forces even captured Panjim and took the Portuguese Viceroy prisoner. While this account is not mentioned in Portuguese records and may be exaggerated, its appearance in more than one Indian source suggests that the campaign around Goa achieved some notable success. Most historians believe that the attack on Goa was primarily intended to distract the Portuguese allowing Rama Raya to focus his main effort on the capture of Santhome.

Events within the Portuguese administration also suggest that the Vijaynagara invasion of 1558 had a significant impact. Viceroy Francisco Barreto had successfully defended Portuguese territories against an invasion by Adil Shah only a year earlier yet he was replaced in September 1558 by Constantino of Braganza. After returning to portugal Barreto was appointed Admiral of the Galleys, a position that carried less prestige than the office of Viceroy. Some historians believe that his failure to prevent the Vijayanagara attacks on Santhome and the siege of Goa may have contributed to his recall. The loss of Santhome and the pressure placed on Goa appear to have been an embarrassment for the Portuguese authorities which may explain why these events received limited attention in Portuguese accounts.

== Aftermath ==
Rama Raya’s campaign successfully restrained Portuguese aggression, preventing them from engaging in further hostilities for the rest of his rule. No records exist of Portuguese attacks on Vijayanagara’s vassals until the empire’s eventual downfall. Trade and commerce between the two powers continued unhindered, leading to the growth and prosperity of Portuguese settlements. Missionary activities, which had previously caused tensions, were largely put on hold. the Portuguese focused on strengthening their fortifications, a decision that proved crucial in the years following Vijayanagara’s collapse. Meanwhile, the empire suffered a devastating defeat at the hands of the Deccan Sultans in the Battle of Tallikota in 1565.

Rama Raya’s death and the destruction of Vijayanagara’s capital marked the end of the empire’s dominance. Though the kingdom persisted in a weakened state, shifting its capital to Penukonda and later to Chandragiri, it never recovered its former strength. This decline had significant consequences for the Portuguese. They lost a crucial trading partner and no longer enjoyed the autonomy and protection they had benefited from for over fifty years. However, in the immediate aftermath, they faced no direct setbacks. With Vijayanagara no longer a formidable force, the Portuguese were free to expand their influence along the coast without opposition and soon resumed their aggressive maritime activities unchecked by the weakened remnants of the empire.

== See also ==
- Portuguese Empire
- Vijayanagara Empire
- Santhome
- Calicut–Portuguese conflicts
- First Luso-Malabarese War
- Gujarati–Portuguese conflicts
