= Goa Institute of Public Administration and Rural Development =

Administrative institute of the Government of Goa, India

Institute overview
- Formed: 1 January 2014; 11 years ago
- Preceding Institute: Rural Development and Administration (1996-2014)
- Status: Active
- Headquarters: Goa, India; 15°29′33.51″N 73°55′4.79″E
- Website: Official website

The Goa Institute of Public Administration and Rural Development (GIPARD) is an administrative institute of the Government of Goa, India. It is located at the Ela Farm at Old Goa.

== History ==
The Goa Institute for Rural Development and Local Administration was established vide Government Order No. 6/3/8 I-PER (Vol. VI) dated 23 October 1996. By an Order dated 5 November 1999, the Government of Goa reconstituted the Goa Institute for Rural Development and Local Administration as the Goa Institute of Rural Development and Administration, an autonomous body "responsible for all aspects of training policy and training management for employees of the Government of Goa", with effect from 1 December 1999. The Goa Institute of Rural Development and Administration was headed by a Board of Governors, chaired by the Minister for Rural Development of the Government of Goa.

The Goa Institute of Rural Development and Administration was dissolved and a new institution named as the Goa Institute of Public Administration & Rural Development (GIPARD) was established on 1 January 2014, as an autonomous body, registered under the Societies Registration Act, 1860.

The GIPARD is also the Administrative Training Institute for Goa. The Government of Goa signed a MoU with the Yashwantrao Chavan Academy of Development Administration (YASHADA), Pune in order to set up the institute.

== Leadership ==
The GIPARD is managed by a Board of Governors, of which the Chief Secretary of Goa is the Ex-Officio President. The institute also has an Executive Committee, of which the Chief Secretary of Goa functions as the Ex-Officio Chairperson.

Sanjay Gihar, an officer of the Indian Administrative Service, is the Director General of the institute. The institute also has its Core Faculty.

== Functions ==
The GIPARD administers training to Officers and staff of the Government of Goa. The institute also provides capacity building training on subjects like rural development, disaster management, Panchayati Raj Institutions, etc.

The GIPARD also trains the members of local self-government bodies of Goa.
