= Chitari art =

Art created by people from Goa, India

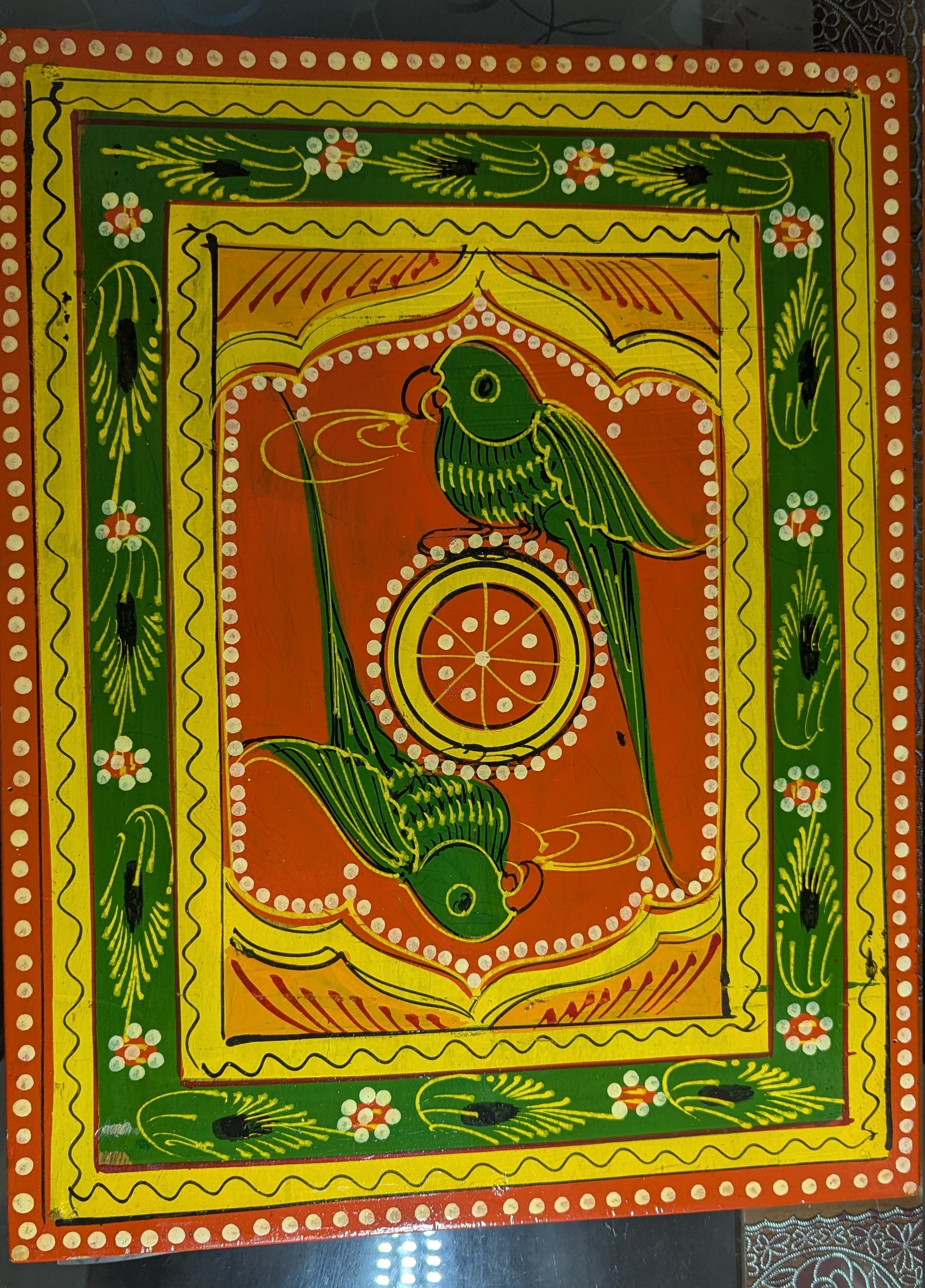
Chitari art

Chitari art is a traditional form of folk art from Goa. Characterized by its vibrant colours and intricate designs, Chitari art has played an important role in decoration during festivals such as Ganesh Chaturthi.

== Etymology ==
The trim "Chitari" originates from the Konkani word "chitarop", which means "to draw".

== Location ==
Chitari art is practiced by some families from the Demani locality of Cuncolim village in South Goa district.

== History ==
Chitari art originated back when Goa's oldest temples were built. Despite the Portuguese colonial suppression of Goa's cultural heritage, this art form persevered and maintain its distinct identity.

Previously, durable wood varieties like bhendi and chivon were used but nowadays low quality wood is used to keep the prices low. Further, organic brushes and colours used previously are now replaced with synthetic products.

== Technique ==
The art form is noted for its use of vibrant reds, greens, yellows and whites. These are painted freehand on the wood of jackfruit, mango, or hedi (local white wood.

=== Products ===
The village of Demani, where the Chitari people live, gets busy during the Ganesh Chaturthi festival. The main product is a paat (low wooden stool) that features two parakeets and a flower on it. People also buy chourangs (pooja pedestals) and even place orders for larger items, the makhar (altar) and matoli (wooden canopy hung above the altar).

== Contemporary revival ==
In recent years, there has been a renewed interest in preserving Chitari art. Local practitioners and cultural enthusiasts are promoting the art form as a vital part of Goan identity. Efforts to revive its traditional methods have also coincided with modern interpretations, ensuring that while the art remains true to its origins, it continues to evolve in the contemporary cultural landscape.
