= Ver (music) =

Ver or Voviyo are songs sung during the pre-marriage ceremony known as Ros/ Roce in Goa, India.The "Voviyo" songs are typically sung by the women in the family and community, and they often include blessings, prayers, and sometimes even playful teasing or advice for the bride and groom. These hymns are an integral part of the Roce ceremony, adding a cultural and emotional layer to the ritual.The "Roce" is a pre-wedding ritual where the bride and groom are anointed with a mixture of coconut milk (roce) and other ingredients, symbolizing purification and blessing.

== See also ==
- Deknni
- Mando
- Fugdi
