= Battle of Margão (1659) =

- Part of Adil Shahi–Portuguese conflicts
- Map of the Velhas Conquistas (in red) and the Novas Conquistas (in yellow).
Date	1659
Location	Margão, Portuguese Goa
Result	Portuguese victory

Belligerents
Portuguese Empire	Sultanate of Bijapur

Commanders and leaders
Luís de Mendonça Furtado	Ali Adil Shah II; Abdulla Hakim

Strength
Unknown	Unknown

Casualties and losses
Unknown	400–500 killed

The Battle of Margão was a military conflict between the Portuguese Empire and the Sultanate of Bijapur that took place in 1659. The battle resulted in a decisive victory for the Portuguese.

== Background ==
In the 1650s, the Dutch East India Company developed friendly ties with the Sultanate of Bijapur and encouraged it to attack Portuguese holdings in India. In 1654, Abdulla Hakim, with Dutch support, led an invasion into the Portuguese territories of Bardes and briefly put the supply of food into Goa in jeopardy, however, the forces of Bijapur were repelled.

Following this conflict, treaties were reaffirmed between the Sultanate and Kingdom of Portugal in 1655. However, in 1659, Ali Adil Shah II again attempted to recapture Portuguese territories in Goa, launching another invasion led by Abdulla Hakim into the Velhas Conquistas.

== The Battle ==
In 1659, Abdulla Hakim led the Bijapur forces into the Velhas Conquistas. However, Luís de Mendonça Furtado responded the invasion with an expedition to Margão. The Bijapur forces were defeated, suffering between 400 and 500 casualties, and they were forced to retreat. Ali Adil Shah II temporarily abandoned his efforts to seize Portuguese territories in Goa.

== See also ==
- Portuguese India
- Adil Shahi–Portuguese conflicts
