= List of seabirds of Goa =

Seabirds are avian species that have high affinity towards open oceans. They spend most of their time in the open waters and return to land only for breeding and rearing their brood. Goa, a west coast state of India, unlike other states of India, has very little ornithological history during its occupancy by Portuguese and virtually no history of seabird records except the effort of Heinz Lainer, a Goa-based ornithologist. Recent studies undertaken through off-shore surveys by several birdwatching groups, businesses and non-profits, has given a start to understanding these lesser known species. A total of 25 species of seabirds have been reported from the state.

== Tropicbirds ==
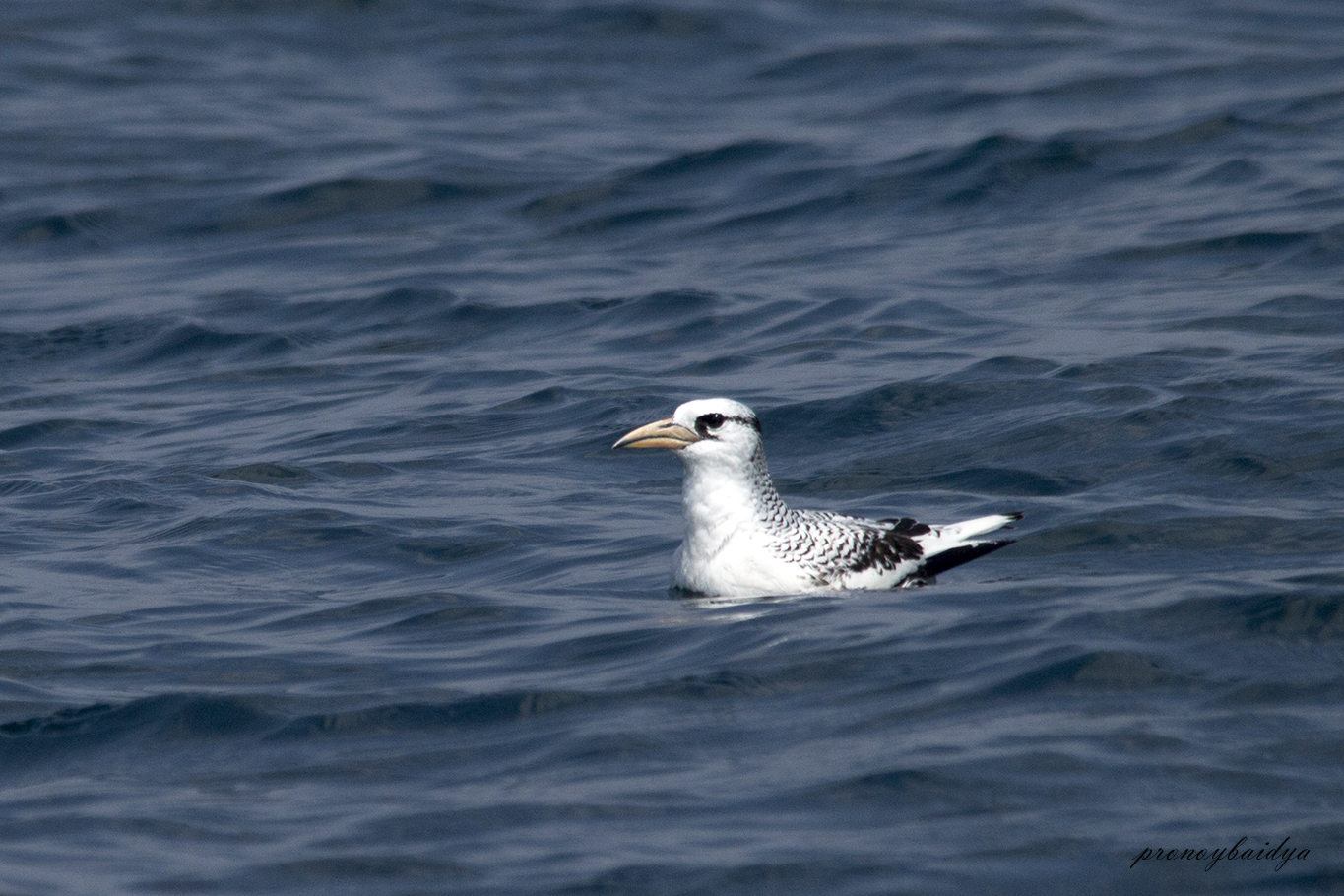
Red-billed tropicbird juvenile off Goa coast

Order: Phaethontiformes Family: Phaethontidae

Tropicbirds are a family, Phaethontidae, of tropical pelagic seabirds. They are the sole living representatives of the order Phaethontiformes. For many years they were considered part of the Pelecaniformes, but genetics indicates they are most closely related to the Eurypygiformes. There are three species in one genus of which one has been listed from Goa.

- Red-billed tropicbird, Phaethon aethereus

== Storm petrels ==
Wilson's storm petrel Order: Procellariiformes Family: Hydrobatidae

The storm petrels are relatives of the petrels and are the smallest seabirds. They feed on planktonic crustaceans and small fish picked from the surface, typically while hovering. The flight is fluttering and sometimes bat-like. There are 6 species which occur in India and two in Goa.

- Wilson's storm petrel, Oceanites oceanicus
- Swinhoe's storm petrel, Hydrobates monorhis

== Shearwaters and petrels ==
Order: Procellariiformes Family: Procellariidae

The procellariids are the main group of medium-sized "true petrels", characterised by united nostrils with medium septum and a long outer functional primary. There are 11 species which occur in India and 3 in Goa.

- Jouanin's petrel, Bulweria fallax
- Persian shearwater, Puffinus persicus
- Flesh-footed shearwater, Ardenna carneipes

== Frigatebirds ==
Order: Suliformes Family: Fregatidae

Frigatebirds are large seabirds usually found over tropical oceans. They are large, black-and-white or completely black, with long wings and deeply forked tails. The males have coloured inflatable throat pouches. They do not swim or walk and cannot take off from a flat surface. Having the largest wingspan-to-body-weight ratio of any bird, they are essentially aerial, able to stay aloft for more than a week. There are 3 species which occur in India and 2 species in Goa.

- Great frigatebird, Fregata minor
- Lesser frigatebird, Fregata ariel

== Boobies and gannets ==
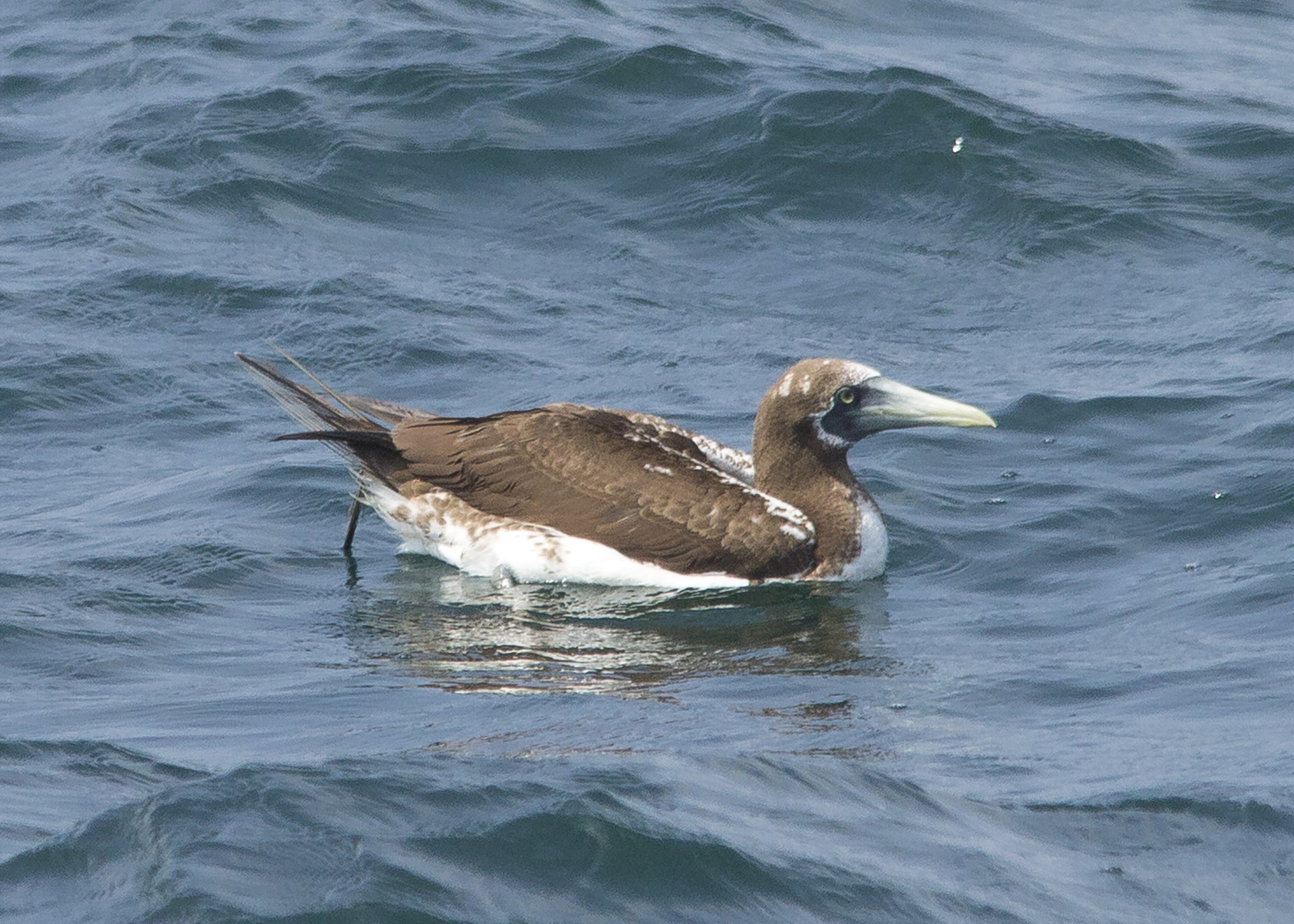
Masked booby juvenile off Goa coast

Order: Suliformes Family: Sulidae

The sulids comprise the gannets and boobies. Both groups are medium to large coastal seabirds that plunge-dive for fish. There are 4 species which occur in India and 3 in Goa.

- Masked booby, Sula dactylatra
- Brown booby, Sula leucogaster
- Red-footed booby, Sula sula

== Sandpipers and allies ==
Order: Charadriiformes Family: Scolopacidae

Scolopacidae is a large diverse family of small to medium-sized shorebirds including the sandpipers, curlews, godwits, shanks, tattlers, woodcocks, snipes, dowitchers and phalaropes. The majority of these species eat small invertebrates picked out of the mud or soil. Variation in length of legs and bills enables multiple species to feed in the same habitat, particularly on the coast, without direct competition for food. Of these phalaropes are considered as seabirds. Phalaropes are close relatives of the shanks and tattlers, the Actitis and Terek sandpipers, and also of the turnstones and calidrids. They are especially notable for two things: their unusual nesting behavior, and their unique feeding technique. There is one species which has been reported from Goa.

- Red-necked phalarope, Phalaropus lobatus

== Skuas ==
The skuas (/ˈskjuːə/) are a group of seabirds with about seven species forming the family Stercorariidae and the genus Stercorarius. The three smaller skuas are called jaegers. There are two species of skuas that have been reported from Goa.

- Parasitic jaeger or Arctic skua, Stercorarius parasiticus
- Pomarine jaeger or pomarine skua, Stercorarius pomarinus

== Gulls ==
Order: Charadriiformes Family: Laridae

Laridae is a family of medium to large seabirds, the gulls and kittiwakes. They are typically grey or white, often with black markings on the head or wings. They have stout, longish bills and webbed feet.

- Brown noddy, Anous stolidus
- Sooty gull, Ichthyaetus hemprichi
- Black-legged kittiwake, Rissa tridactyla
- Slender-billed Gull, Chroicocephalus genei

== Terns ==
Order: Charadriiformes Family: Sternidae

Terns are a group of generally medium to large seabirds typically with grey or white plumage, often with black markings on the head. Most terns hunt fish by diving but some pick insects off the surface of fresh water. Terns are generally long-lived birds, with several species known to live in excess of 30 years.

- Sooty tern, Sterna fuscata
- Bridled tern, Sterna anaethetus
- Roseate tern Sterna dougallii
- Common tern, Sterna hirundo
- White-cheeked tern Sterna repressa
- Lesser crested tern, Thalasseus bengalensis
- Sandwich tern, Thalasseus sandvicensis
- Great crested tern, Thalasseus bergii
