= Nanda Lake =

Lake in Goa, India

- Location within India
- Interactive map of Nanda Lake
- Location: Curchorem, Goa, India
- Coordinates: 15°14′10.5″N 74°06′33″E
- Area: 0.42 km^{2} (0.16 sq mi)

Ramsar Wetland
- Official name: Nanda Lake
- Designated: 8 June 2022
- Reference no.: 2471

Nanda lake is a Ramsar site located in the Indian state of Goa. It is situated in Curchorem. Covering an area of 0.42 square kilometres, it is the only Ramsar wetland site in Goa.

== History ==
The lake was notified as a wetland by the Indian government on 2021 under the Wetland (Conservation and Management) Rules, 2017. On 3 August 2022, it was declared as a Ramsar wetland site on 2022 Ramsar Convention .

== Fauna ==
The wetland is home to red-wattled lapwing, black-headed ibis, bronze-winged jacana, brahminy kite, common kingfisher, wire-tailed swallow, intermediate egret, little cormorant and lesser whistling duck.

(Acridotheres fuscus), (Acrocephalus stentoreus), (Actitis hypoleucos), (Aegithina tiphia), (Alcedo atthis), (Ardea purpurea), (Ardeotis nigriceps), (Brachythemis contaminata), (Bradinopyga geminata), (Brumoides suturalis), (Bubalus bubalis), (Camponotus compressus), (Castalius rosimon), (Centropus sinensis), (Ceriagrion cerinorubellum), (Chilocorus nigritus), (Coccinella transversalis), (Crocothemis servilia), (Danaus genutia), (Delias eucharis), (Dendrocygna javanica), (Dicaeum concolor), (Dicrurus macrocercus), (Dinopium benghalense), (Dolichopus nigricornis), (Drosophila melanogaster), (Egretta garzetta), (Egretta intermedia), (Euchrysops cnejus), (Eudynamys scolopaceus), (Euploea core), (Eurema hecabe), (Freyeria putli), (Gallinago gallinago), (Glareola lactea), (Gryllodes sigillatus), (Halcyon smyrnensis), (Haliastur indus), (Hirundo rustica), (Hirundo smithii), (Idea jasonia), (Ixobrychus cinnamomeus), (Junonia almana), (Junonia atlites), (Lasius niger), (Lepidocephalichthys thermalis), (Lepisma saccharina), (Leptocoma zeylonica), (Leptoptilos javanicu), (Leptosia nina), (Libellula needhami), (Lonchura malacca), (Lutrogale perspicillata), (Megalaima viridis), (Melanitis leda), (Merops orientalis), (Merops philippinus), (Metopidius indicus), (Microcarbo niger), (Micronia aculeata), (Milvus migrans), (Motacilla flava), (Motacilla maderaspatensis), (Neptis hylas), (Nettapus coromandelianus), (Neurothemis fulvia), (Neurothemis tullia), (Nycticorax nycticorax), (Oecophylla smaragdina), (Oriolus kundoo), (Orphulella pelidna), (Orthotomus sutorius), (Oxyopes shweta), (Paratrechina longicornis), (Pardaleodes edipus), (Peucetia viridans), (Phalacrocorax fuscicollis), (Phylloscopus trochiloides), (Plegadis falcinellus), (Ploceus manyar), (Pluvialis fulva), (Polyrhachis dives), (Porphyrio porphyrio poliocephalus), (Prinia socialis), (Prinia sylvatica), (Pseudagrion microcephalum), (Pseudibis papillosa), (Pycnonotus cafer), (Pycnonotus jocosus), (Pycnonotus luteolus), (Rhipidura albogularis), (Rhyothemis variegata), (Sarangesa dasahara), (Saxicoloides fulicatus), (Spialia galba), (Spilopelia chinensis), (Sterna aurantia), (Tanaecia lepidea), (Taractrocera maevius), (Tetraponera rufonigra), (Threskiornis melanocephalus), (Vanellus indicus), (Ypthima huebneri),
