= List of Goans in cricket =

== Cricketers of Goan origin who have played Test cricket ==
- Wallis Mathias for Pakistan in 1955
- Antao D'Souza for Pakistan in 1959
- Dilip Sardesai for India in 1961
- Paras Mhambrey for India in 1996

== Cricketers of Goan origin who have played international cricket ==
- Jack Britto for Malawi from 1954 onwards
- Alban Fernandes for Tanzania
- Armand "Chic" Saldanha for Tanzania (was the 12th man)
- Michael D'Sa for Uganda
- Peter D'Souza for East Africa
- Charlie D'Souza for East Africa
- Lawrence Fernandes for East Africa
- John "Chuck" Sequeira for Uganda
- Lawrence Barretto for Uganda
- Lawrence Dias for Uganda
- Blaise D'Cunha for Kenya
- Celly Dias for Uganda
- Edwin Fonseca for Uganda
- Saurabh Netravalkar for USA
- Aayan Afzal Khan for UAE

== Goan cricketers for India in age-group tournaments ==
- Saurabh Bandekar – India U-19
- Rahul Keni – India U-19

== Goa Ranji Cricket Team ==
Goa cricket team
