= List of galleries, libraries, museums and archives in Goa =

This is a list of galleries, libraries, archives and museums in the State of Goa, India.

== Galleries ==
- Archaeological Museum and Portrait Gallery, Old Goa
- Institute Menezes Braganza/Instituto Vasco da Gama, Panjim
- Kala Academy, Panjim
- Sunaparanta, Goa Centre for the Arts

== Libraries ==
- Bookworm Children's Library, Taleigao
- Dr Francisco Luis Gomes District Library, Navelim
- Goa State Central Library
- Goa University Library, Taleigao
- Goa Chambers of Commerce and Industry Library, Near Azad Maidan, Panjim
- Goa Engineering College Library, Farmagudi, Ponda
- Goa Legislative Assembly Library, Alto-Porvorim
- Gomantak Marathi Academy, Porvorim
- Institute Menezes Braganza Library, Panjim
- Kala Academy Library, Panjim

== Archives ==
- Xavier Centre of Historical Research, Alto Porvorim
- Archdiocese of Goa, Altinho, Panjim/Panaji

== Museums ==
- Archaeological Museum and Portrait Gallery, Old Goa
- Ashvek Vintage World, Nuvem
- Big Foot Museum, Loutolim
- Goa Chitra Museum, Benaulim
- Goa Science Centre, Panaji
- Goa State Museum, Panaji
- Museum of Christian Art, Old Goa
- Museum of Goa, Pilerne
- Naval Aviation Museum (India), Vasco da Gama
