= Traditional occupations of Goa =

Traditional occupations of Goa refers to the work and jobs which the people of Goa undertook in the earlier times, which might now be coming under pressure for a variety of reasons.earlier farming was an important job carried by the majority of Goan people for their day to day livings. They had to spend most of their time working in their own fields. At the end of the day or in the late evening they return home very tired and then the next day continues with the same.

== Fifty ancient traditions ==
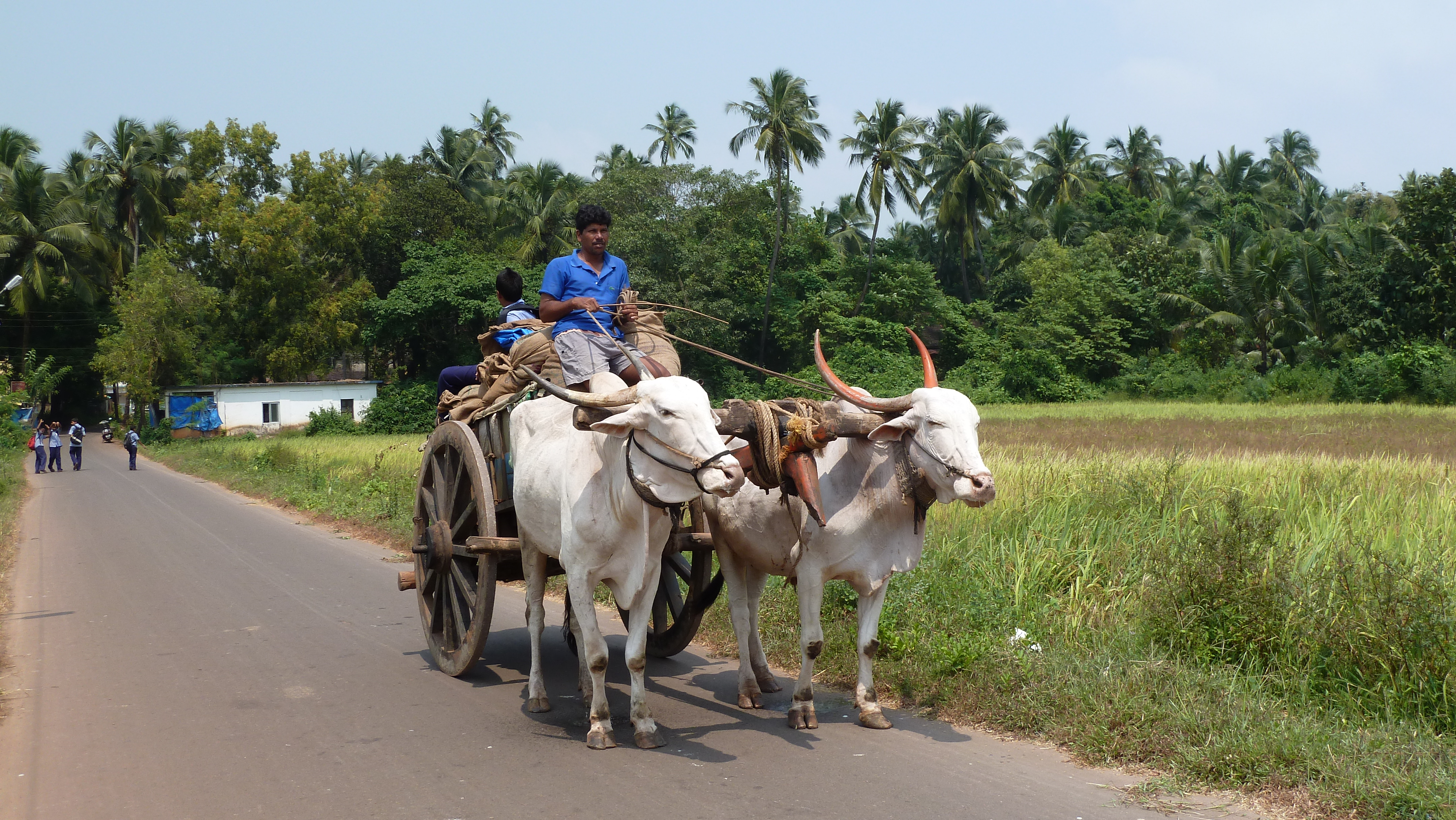
Agriculture has long been one of the traditional occupations of Goa.

Pantaleão Fernandes, photographer and author, has listed "50 ancient traditions of Goa that show how everyday work had a soul of artisanship in those good old days."

== Occupations listed ==
Some fields listed as traditional occupation are agriculture, sand extraction, coconut plantations, betel nut plantations, cashew plantations, brewing feni, cashew nut processing, among others.

Goatourism.Org, cited by Goanet lists traditional occupations such as the khumbar (potter), the chamar (cobbler), the mahar (bamboo and cane crafts person), the barber, and practitioners of other professions like the shetty (goldsmith), zo (idol makers who sculpt statues of wood and ivory), chari (blacksmiths), chittari (lacquer work artisans), and kansar (brass lamp and copper vessel makers).

In her book on Goa's traditional salt industry, Reyna Sequeira describes how prominent Goa's traditional salt industry once was, but has now shrunk to make its presence felt in just a handful of villages.

Historian Teotonio R. de Souza, in his book Goa To Me, describes Goa's traditional crafts which "were organized in their own castes which were endogamous and ensured both the continuity of a craft needed by the community as well as the accumulation of skill through generations of practice in the same family." He mentions the guns manufactured by the blacksmiths in Goa (and mentions Cuncolim, where the manufacture of guns was banned by a Portuguese viceroy), carpenters producing household furniture and agricultural implements, kharvis (traditional fishermen) who had a "variety of nets that were meant for catching different types of fish (koblem, mag, kanttai, zau, ramponn, kann'ni, paguer, etc)" He also refers to craft associations associated with "palm products, supplying brooms, spoons, ropes, coir mattresses, woven leaves, oil, toddy, vinegar, arrack, palm sugar". The caju industry that is "so popular today" does not seem to have begun till after the end of the nineteenth century, according to Souza.

== Current status ==
Journalist Sheela Jaywant suggests that children in Goa have lost touch with "how your grandparents lived and worked", and many in the region of now might have not "bought a garment woven on a hand loom...[or] eaten ushichem god" (jaggery made from sugarcane).

== Effort to revival ==
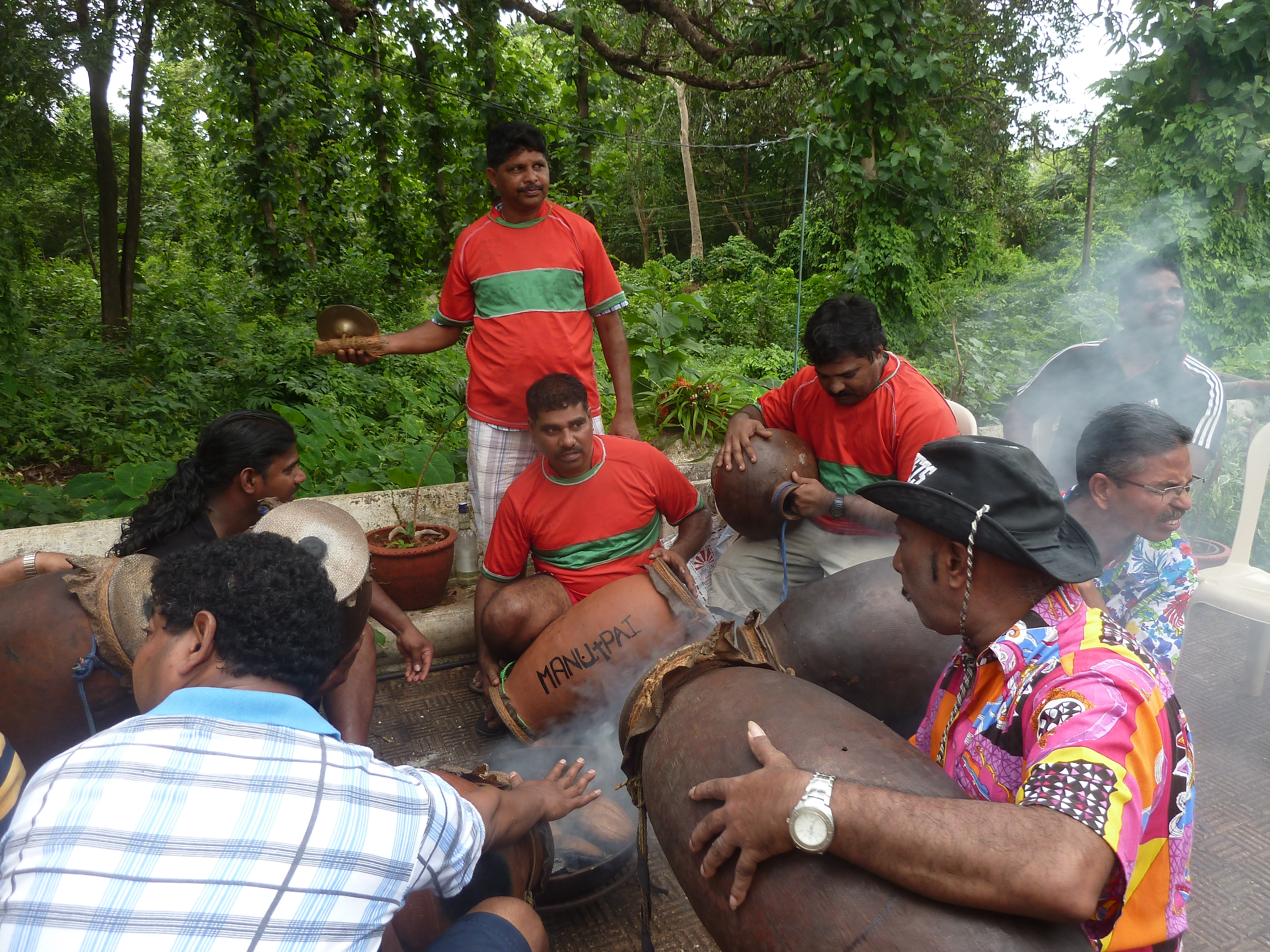
Traditional musicians heat up their drums (ghumots) in Goa before taking part in a musical programme.

The Bahrain-based Goan poet Maria Conceição Pereira authored, around 2011, a book called Goenchi Girestkai (The Wealth of Goa), in "an effort to revive the Goan heritage that is fading out." She was quoted by the Gulf Daily News as saying the book aimed to "instill some knowledge about Goan traditions and professions". Her book looks at the people who worked in a dozen traditional occupations of Goa—fishermen, carpenters, bakers, coconut pickers, toddy-tappers, barbers, grave-diggers, church helpers, ploughmen, tailors, postmen and potters. Pereira was born in Arossim and graduated from Carmel College in Goa.

The Goa Chitra Museum represents and supports traditional Goan culture.

== External sources ==
- Traditional occupations of Pernem, video
- Presentation: Traditional Occupations of Goa by Pantaleao Fernandes
- Traditional Goa, Part I by JoeGoaUk
- ‘Mhalo’ or ‘The Local Barber’ | Traditional Occupation in Goa
- Boatmen of India: Kharvis from Goa
- The coconut pluckers of Goa
- Goa's traditional occupations: The Kumbar, The Chamar, The Mahar, etc. fading away!
- Traditional Farming Seeks Market in Goa
