= Goa Chitra Museum =

Indian museum

- Location: H.No. 498, Near Auxilium High School, Benaulim, Goa 403716
- Coordinates: 15.26595°N 73.94129°E
- Type: Ethnographic museum
- Founder: Victor Hugo Gomes
- Website: http://www.goachitra.com/

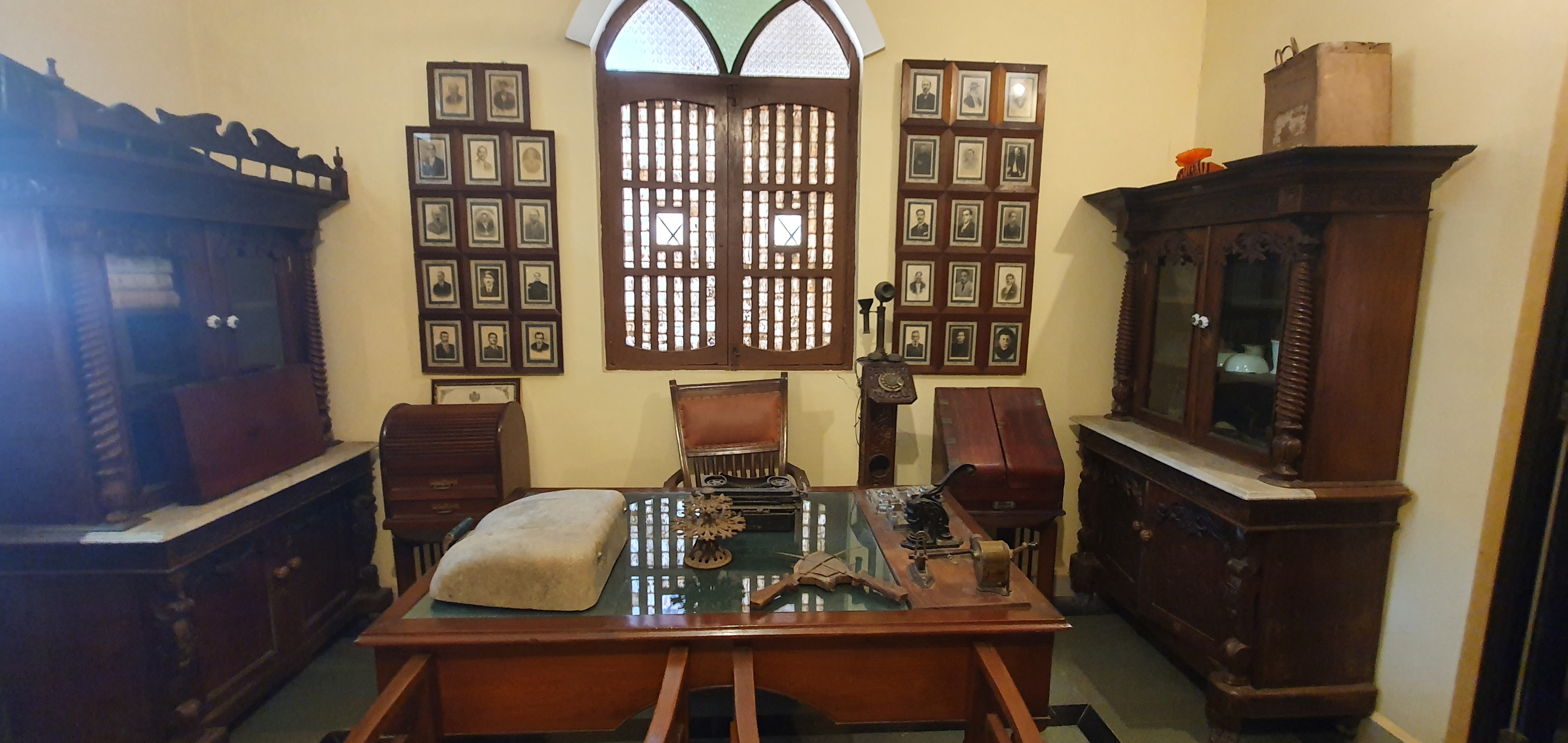
Goa Chitra Museum

The Goa Chitra is an ethnographic museum based in the former Portuguese colony (and now India's smallest state) of Goa. It has a large collection—over 40,000 artefacts—focusing on Goa's traditional agrarian technology and lifestyle.

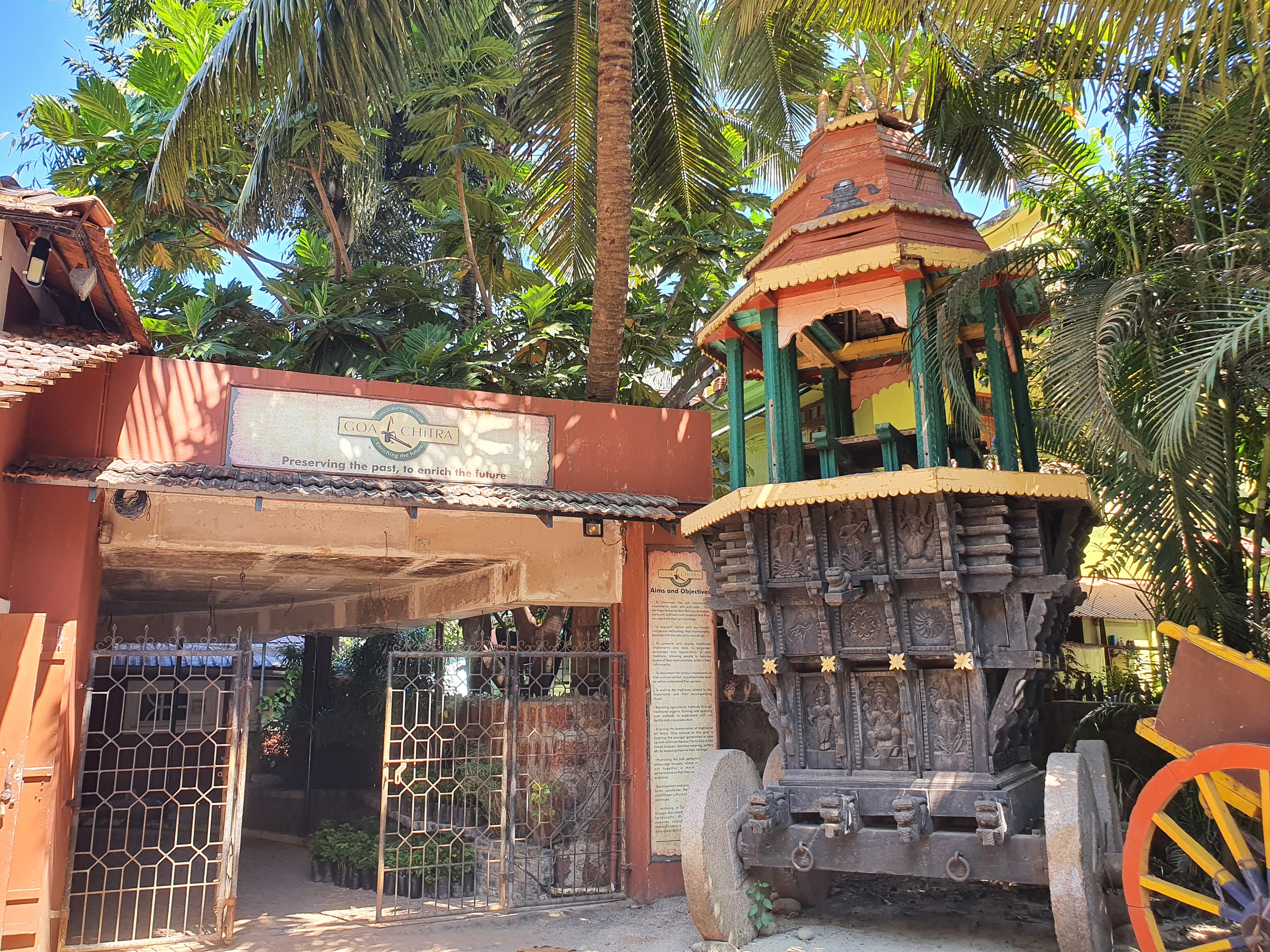
Goa Chitra Museum, entrance.

The museum is based in the coastal Goan village of Benaulim. It was opened to the public in 2009, run by the artist-curator-restorer Victor Hugo Gomes. Gomes, a lifelong collector of objects, states about his journey working on the museum: “It is not easy; I am self-funded. I am not even registered as an NGO or non-profit. I run these museums not as spaces where one comes to see the dead, reads labels, and moves on but as collections of pieces that have an extensive story to tell and are living odes to our material heritage and culture".

TimeOut Mumbai has described the museum as "one of Goa's most charming attractions" and added that "this little rural complex houses thousands of traditional implements, vessels and tools that evolved over centuries in the agrarian heartland of Goa in the service of farming and other traditional trades".

== History ==
The museum essentially started with the founder Victor's passion for collecting rare vintage or discarded artefacts which had a story to tell. It was while living with his grandmother as a child, and as a result of the stories being narrated to him, Victor learnt the importance of conserving history, culture, and traditions through material objects. A graduate of the Goa College of Art, he soon became saddened by the speed at which old traditions and objects were being relinquished in his homeland. He left Goa for Lucknow on a scholarship at the Lucknow College of Arts and Crafts. Thereafter he learnt restoration and conservation at the Indian National Trust for Art and Cultural Heritage (INTACH) Centre. Upon returning to Goa in 1991, he briefly worked at the Museum of Christian Art but soon quit his job and continued to work on his passion for collecting objects. Soon after, in the subsequent years, these collections were to become more organised and take up the form of the Goa Chitra Museum, as one knows it today.

== Collections ==
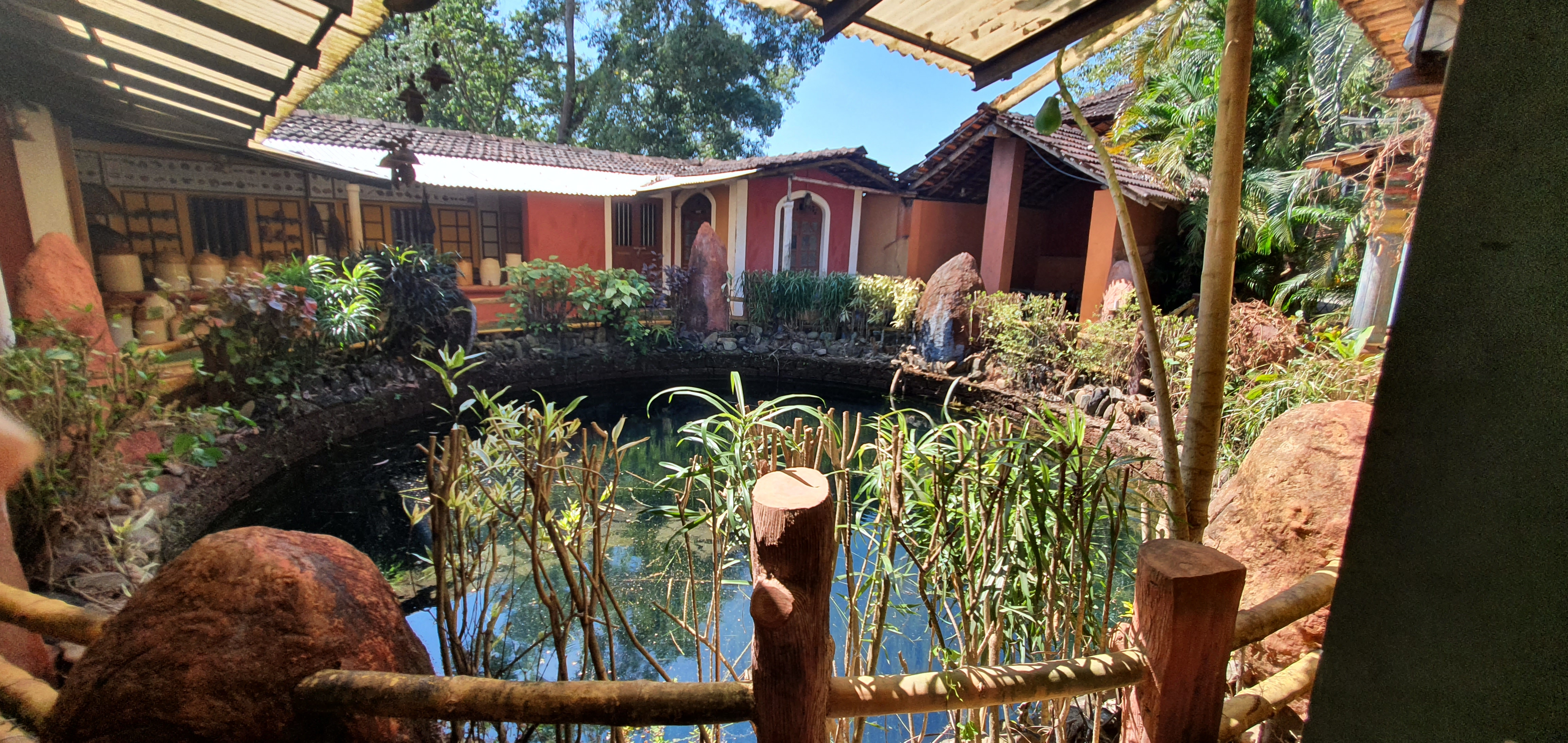
Goa Chitra view.

The name of the museum—Goa Chitra—is a combination of two words: Goa (name of the region) and chitra (trans. pictures). The museum as a space is strategically categorised into three areas—"Goa Chitra, which celebrates the people’s connection with their land; Goa Chakra, a collection of non-mechanized vehicles from across country and time; and Goa Cruti, a colonial testimony to the objects introduced by the Portuguese in Goa". Goa Chitra's collection includes examples of local pottery, farming tools, musical instruments, ancient carts and palanquins—from different points in the past. It also showcases an organic farm for the cultivation of various vegetables, herbs, spices, sugarcane, and rice—all staples of the area in coastal western India.

== Eco-use ==
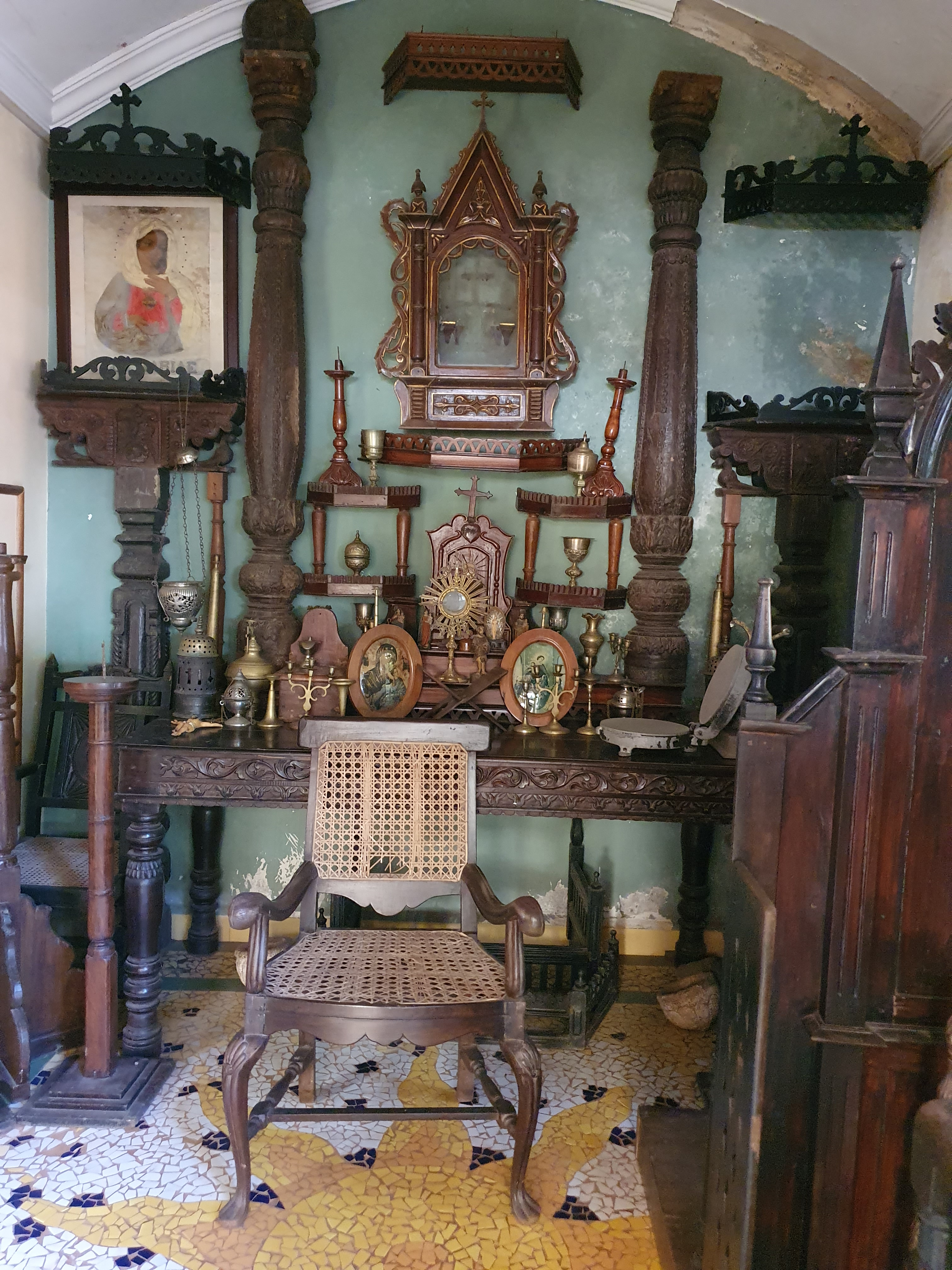
From another era.

Fertiliser and pesticides utilised are made from farm waste, using traditional techniques. Rather ingeniously, human waste from the living quarters is also converted to bio-gas, and together with solar power, provides the energy needs of the farm.

== Topmost contemporary museum ==
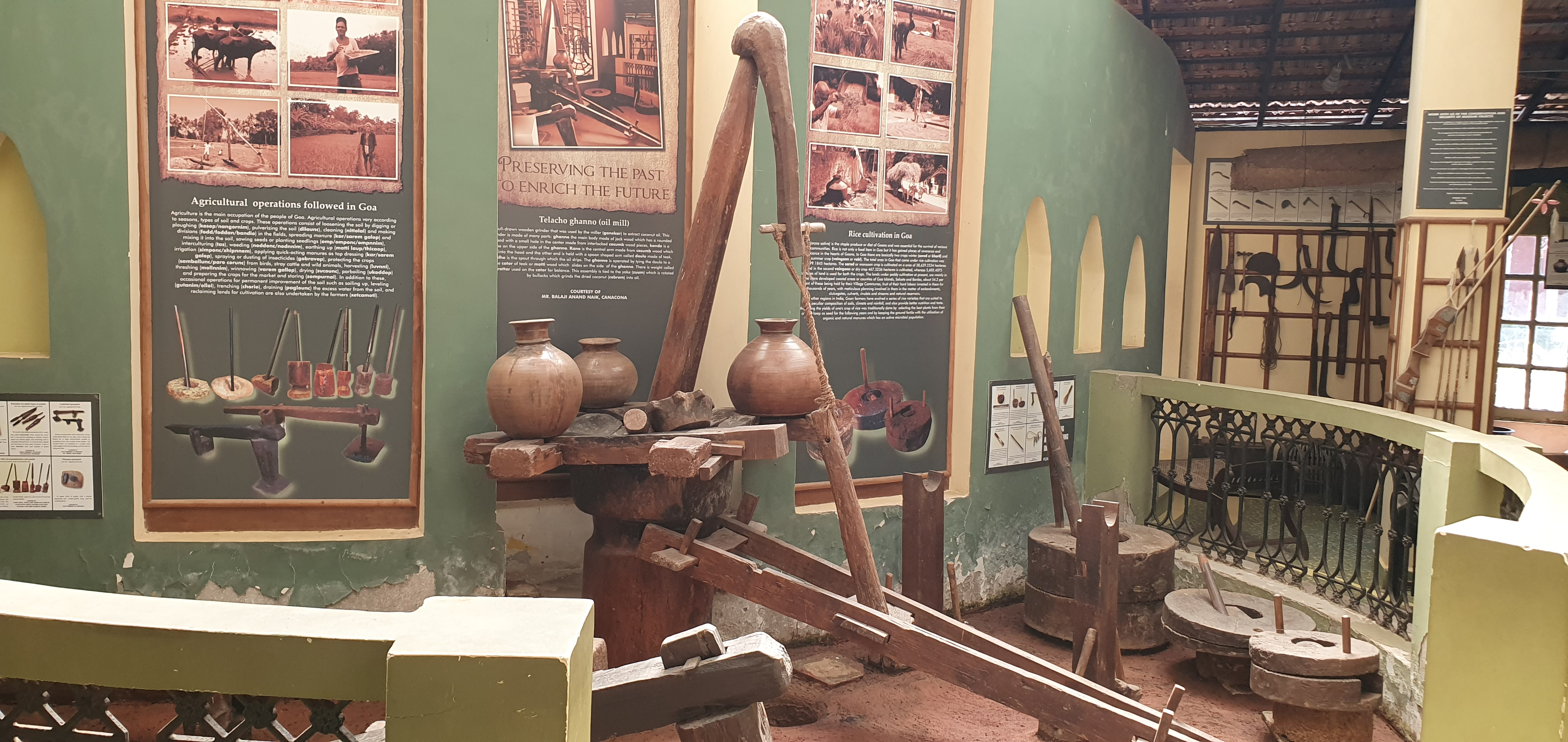
Goa Chitra setting.

The Goa Chitra Museum has been rated by the Archaeological Survey of India as the "topmost contemporary museum" in India.

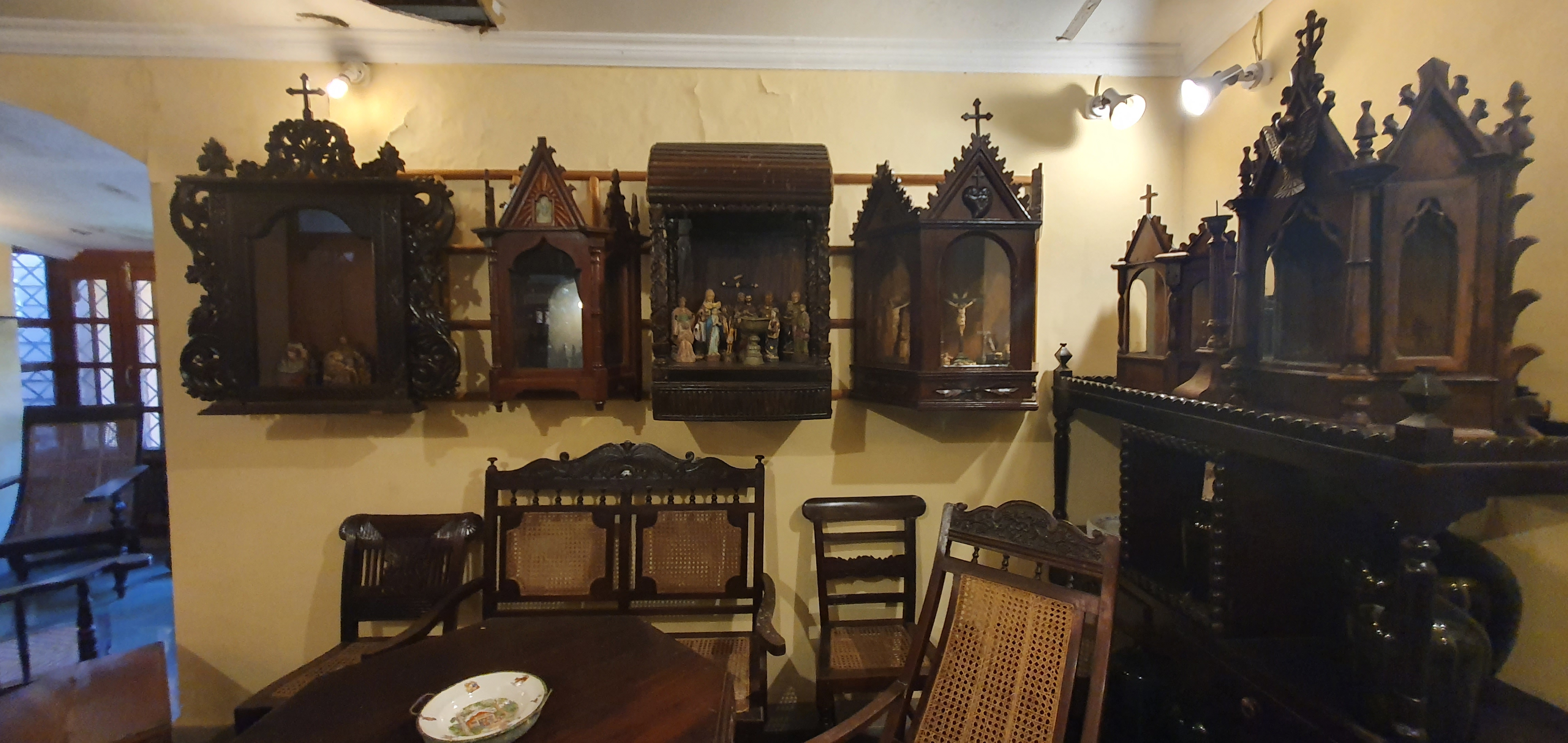
Altars.

TIME, in a write-up, said: "The exhibits include hundreds of tillage implements, in testimony to a time when agriculture was Goa's mainstay. (Now, tourism and mining are the key industries and Goa depends on neighboring states for such staples as cereals and vegetables.) A sugarcane grinder standing almost five meters high is one of the main focal points of the museum. Gomes took over two years to restore it."

== Plans ==
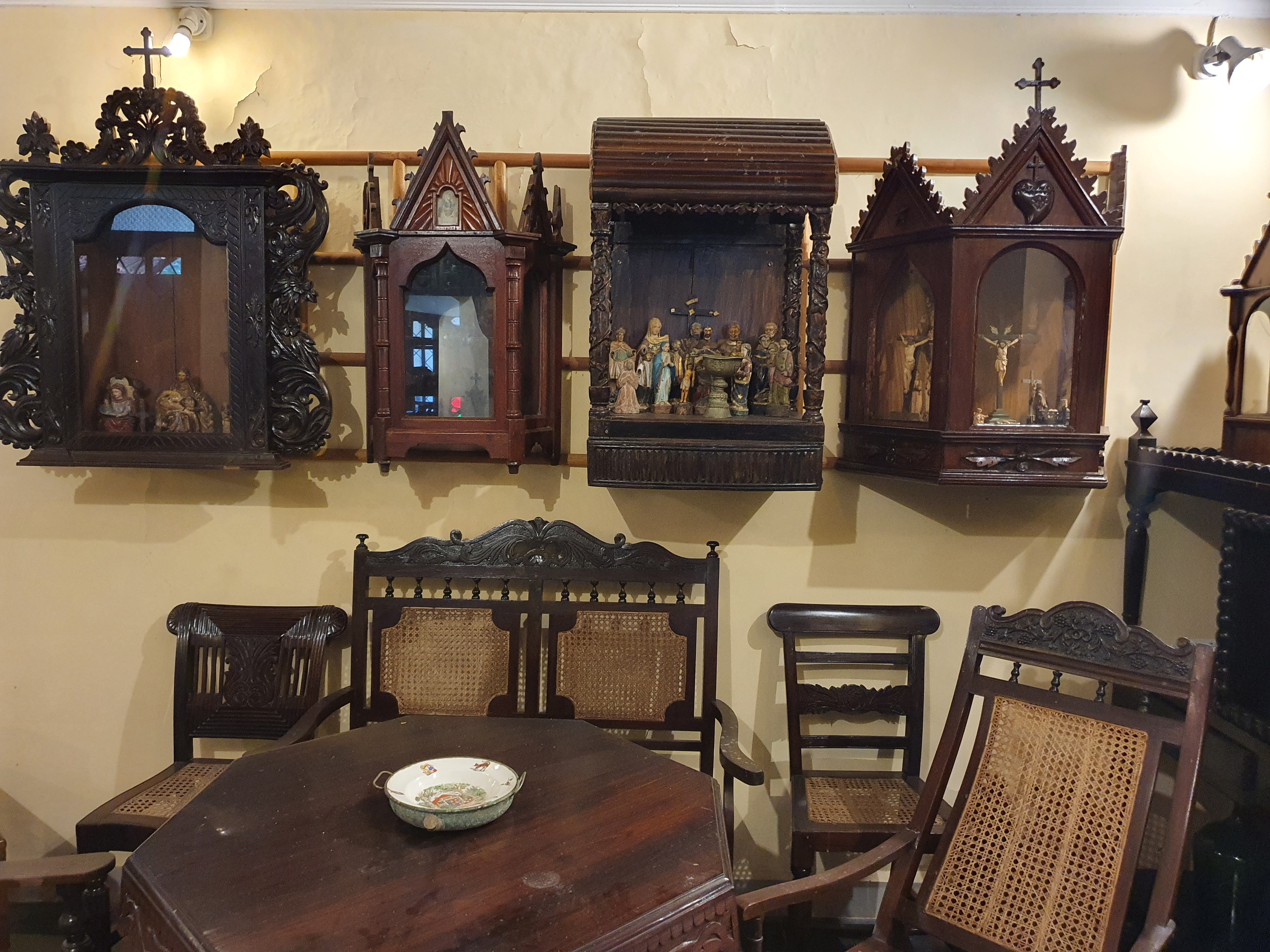
Furniture, etc.

The museum plans to be a focal point for providing information to its visitors, offer workshops for young children from schools, and university students to collaborate with artisans, and facilitate the process of craft development to make contemporary products based on the inspiration of their local traditions which are saleable and help them earn towards a dignified life, and build a documentation-dissemination plan to "guarantee the systematic collection of information about the operation of the project and provide the basis for sharing information with other similar projects." According to Gomes, he aims to make the museum a space wherein the younger generation can not only participate, learn, and question regarding their shared past through intangible heritage and memories, but also embrace "sustainable traditional practices which may be considered today as alternatives".

== See also ==
- List of food and beverage museums
