= Church and Convent of Santa Monica =

Former Augustinian convent in Old Goa, India

Convent and Church of Santa Monica
- The church of Santa Monica
- Alternative names: Real Mosteiro de Santa Mónica; Royal Monastery of Santa Monica

General information
- Architectural style: Late Renaissance, Mannerist and Manueline features
- Location: Rua das Mónicas, Monte Santo, City of Goa, Goa, India
- Construction started: 2 July 1606
- Completed: 1627
- Owner: Archdiocese of Goa
- Affiliation: Catholic Church

Technical details
- Material: Laterite, lime plaster, timber

Website
- museumofchristianart.com

The Convent and Church of Santa Monica (Portuguese: Real Mosteiro de Santa Mónica), also called the Royal Monastery of Santa Monica, is a former Augustinian convent on Monte Santo in the historic City of Goa. Founded in 1606 by Dom Frei Aleixo de Menezes, Archbishop of Goa, and completed in 1627, it is described by scholars as the first enclosed female religious house in the Orient and was the only convent for women in Goa. It was dedicated to Saint Monica, the mother of Augustine of Hippo. It was one of the largest monastic complexes in the region.

Built in the capital of the Eastern Portuguese Empire, then among the wealthiest and most cosmopolitan cities of Asia, the convent received women of different social backgrounds, including maidens and widows, from thirty-six places, among them Lisbon, Porto, Macau, Malacca and Goa. It enjoyed royal patronage, which gave it the title Real ("Royal"). Its quadrangular complex was built around a cloister of eighty arches, and the cloister garden was known to the nuns as the Valley of Lilies. Its attached church holds an altar of a crucifix long venerated as miraculous.

The convent declined with the city, and the last nun died in 1885. The buildings later served as military quarters and, from 1968, housed the Mater Dei Institute, a theological centre for women religious. The church and choir now house the Museum of Christian Art, which displays Goa's sacred Indo-Portuguese art.

== Background ==
After Afonso de Albuquerque, impelled by the counsels of Timoji, conquered the city in 1510, it became the seat of the Portuguese Eastern Empire and the centre of Catholic missionary activity in Asia. Goa was raised to an archdiocese in 1557 and oversaw missions from East Africa to Japan. By the late sixteenth century it was known as "the Rome of the East", a city of great cathedrals, colleges, hospitals and religious houses, home to the Franciscans, Dominicans, Augustinians, Carmelites, Jesuits and others.

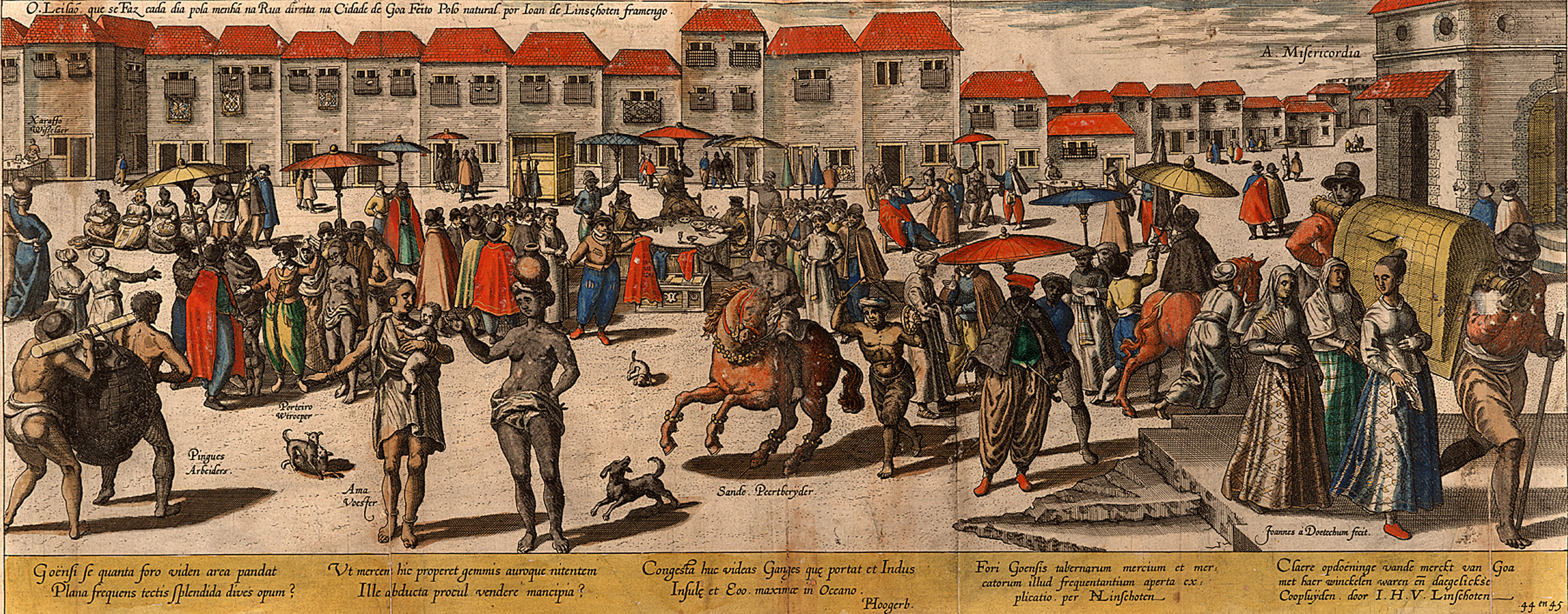
Rua Direita in the city of Goa

Before 1606, however, Goa had no convent for women. Churchmen of the period, writing in the reforming spirit of the Council of Trent, regarded the city's soldiers, merchants and mixed religious and social life as a danger to female virtue and to the honour of families, and they saw enclosure as a remedy that suited Goa especially well. The Augustinian chronicler Agostinho de Santa Maria later wrote that the convent was founded to serve a lost world as an ark in which souls might be saved ("para que pudesse servir àquelle perdido mundo, como de outra arca").

== History ==
=== Foundation (1606–1627) ===
Dom Frei Aleixo de Menezes, founder of the convent

The convent was the project of Dom Frei Aleixo de Menezes, an Augustinian friar born in Lisbon in 1559, who became Archbishop of Goa in 1595 and governed the Estado da Índia from 1606 to 1609; he later served as Archbishop of Braga and as viceroy of Portugal, and died in Madrid in 1617. In Goa he founded three institutions for women: the Recolhimento de Nossa Senhora da Serra (1605), for the Órfãs d'El-Rei and other orphans of the elite; the Casa de Maria Madalena (1609), for repentant women; and, last of the three, the convent. According to scholars cited by Oliveira, the archbishop compared the three houses to the Trinity, with the convent standing for the Father.

The Crown refused permission several times. The archbishop obtained the king's authorisation in 1605, on condition that the Council of State agree; after he became governor in 1606 the Council gave its support.

The foundation stone was laid on 2 July 1606 on the northern slope of Monte Santo above the Mandovi River, near the convent of Our Lady of Grace, which placed the new house within the existing Augustinian landscape of the city. The first novices entered by September 1606, when the convent numbered eighteen nuns. (Note: An inscription on the façade, as transcribed by Cruz and Duarte (p. 144, n. 34), gives 3 September 1606 as the date of the founding.)

The first prioress was Filipa Ferreira (died 1626), who professed as Filipa da Trindade. Santa Maria presents this widow and her daughter Maria de Sá as models of female virtue. Filipa came to Goa from Taná in 1604, took charge of orphans before the recolhimento was built, and became superior after her novitiate; her daughter, who took the name Maria do Espírito Santo, professed with fifteen other young women.

==== Legal status and construction ====
The institution's legal footing was settled in stages: a bull of Pope Paul V in 1613; a royal decree in 1620 fixing the number of professed nuns at one hundred and granting an annual endowment of eight thousand cruzados; confirmation by Pope Gregory XV in 1622; and formal royal patronage by 1636.

The Augustinian friar Diogo de Sant'Ana (1572–1644), the convent's confessor and administrator for thirty-seven years, directed the construction. The first buildings were modest, with a small chapel serving as both church and choir. To complete the quadrangular plan the nuns bought forty-two houses and three public streets, which led to disputes with residents. The permanent church was consecrated on 19 December 1627, and Santa Maria's chronicle records the cost of the building campaign as 200,000 cruzados. Fonseca gives the cost as £20,000.

=== Conflict, royal patronage and fire (1620–1640) ===
The convent's rapid growth in property and prestige drew opposition. In a letter to the king in 1620 the Goa city council accused it of concentrating wealth and of drawing rich widows and young Portuguese women away from marriage, which the council thought harmful to a city that relied on married settlers for its defence. Fr. Diogo de Sant'Ana answered in a written defence, and the Inquisition of Goa also spoke in the convent's favour. Between 1632 and 1635, under the viceroy Miguel de Noronha, the council sought to suppress the institution and take its resources, and there were repeated attempts to remove Sant'Ana from his post. Stability returned in 1635 with Noronha's successor, Pedro da Silva, who restored royal protection, later confirmed by decrees of 1637. In 1636 the king gave the convent the title Real and limited the number of nuns to one hundred.

On Christmas Eve 1636 a fire destroyed the dormitories, the upper choir and the timber roofs; the church, sacristy and novitiate survived. The nuns saved the image of the Holy Crucifix by passing it through the choir grilles moments before the roof collapsed. Reconstruction began at once under Sant'Ana. The nuns lived at the convent of Our Lady of Grace until 1638, and the works were finished in 1640, with a renewed artistic programme.

=== Decline and closure ===
In the early eighteenth century the Augustinian friars' tutelage of the convent was contested by the Archbishop of Goa, Inácio de Santa Teresa. The dispute divided the sisterhood and led a group of nuns to leave the cloister (1731–1734).

The convent's decline followed that of the city of Goa. While many religious houses in Goa were closed in 1835, the convent stayed open with limits on the admission of novices and on spending. In 1804 there were sixty-one professed nuns and four novices; by 1827 fewer than thirty remained; in 1856 there were about seven, and a decade later four. The vault of the church nave collapsed in 1849. When the Portuguese writer Lopes Mendes visited in 1871, only one nun lived there with her servant. The last nun died in 1885, and the convent was dissolved. (Note: Oliveira (2011) reports that by 1878 only one nun, Sóror Josefa do Coração de Jesus, remained; Cruz and Duarte give 1885 for the death of the last nun.)

=== Twentieth century to the present ===
After the closure the complex was altered and later used as military quarters; from 1968 it housed the Mater Dei Institute. The institute, launched in 1964, has trained more than 6,000 women religious from India and neighbouring countries. An architectural survey of the convent by Luís Benavente, dated 1961, remains the main record of its internal layout.

== Architecture ==
The church and convent façade

The convent stands on Monte Santo within the Augustinian group of buildings that structured the sacred landscape of the city. Eighteenth-century maps record its footprint, though enclosure kept surveyors from entering. The most reliable record of the interior is Benavente's 1961 plan, which shows an approximately square enclosure about fifty-nine metres on each side, organised around a cloister of eighty arches with a central well. The building adapts to the slope through vaulted substructures and terraced levels, and its ground floor is zoned, with service areas to the east, domestic accommodation to the north and storage to the west. It was built mainly of local laterite with basalt in places, originally finished in lime plaster. Inside the enclosure were orchards, vegetable plots, flower terraces, twelve perennial wells, and a square known as Jerusalem with a carved black-stone cross.

=== Church ===
The south front, with the church and choir, formed the convent's public face while the cloister stayed enclosed. The façade has a symmetrical, frontal composition, but access is from the side and the church runs parallel to the façade; Paulo Varela Gomes called this a "pseudo-frontal" façade. Two public doors, one for men and one for women, make it the earliest documented example of such an arrangement in the Portuguese world. The façade has two levels, pilasters and cornices, five bays, and a central inscription under the arms of Aleixo de Menezes above which a niche holds an image of Saint Monica; the buttresses were not part of the original composition and were added after the roof collapse of 1849.

Altar of the church of Santa Monica

The church is a single nave with no transept or side chapels, one of the simplest church plans in Goa. A masonry arch with iron grilles separated the nave from the nuns' upper and lower choirs, which together held about one hundred nuns; the upper choir had ninety-six carved wooden stalls, and above the arch stood a cross with a miraculous image of the Crucified Christ, flanked by Saint Augustine and Saint William, beside a gallery with the organs. The gilded high altarpiece, built entirely of wood, centred on a Crucifixion group and held a silver tabernacle with a relic of the True Cross. According to Fr. Diogo de Sant'Ana's regulations of 1636 the convent had seven chapels; later sources count sixteen.

=== Cloister and the Valley of Lilies ===
The cloister rises three levels above a semi-basement, except on the south, where the church stands. The lower levels have arches and the upper level rectangular windows, and the corridors have intersecting barrel vaults that were originally frescoed. Its garden, with a central fountain, fruit trees and herbs, was known as the Valley of Lilies. The upper galleries held the dormitories and cells, and the convent had three infirmaries for nuns and one for servants. A separate novitiate wing with a chapel of the Holy Trinity, a treasury opened by three keys held by different people, and a kitchen complex with a hydraulic water and drainage system stood beyond the cloister.

=== Present condition ===
Only the church and choir are accessible today, where they house the Museum of Christian Art. The large vaulted hall beneath the cloister, whose ceiling has 119 painted coffers, now serves as a refectory for the Mater Dei Institute. The church, which had suffered years of neglect and improper modifications, was restored in 2016.

== See also ==
- City of Goa
- Basilica of Bom Jesus
- Se Cathedral
- Órfãs d'El-Rei
- Aleixo de Menezes
- Museum of Christian Art
