= Goanet =

Mailing list related to the Indian state of Goa

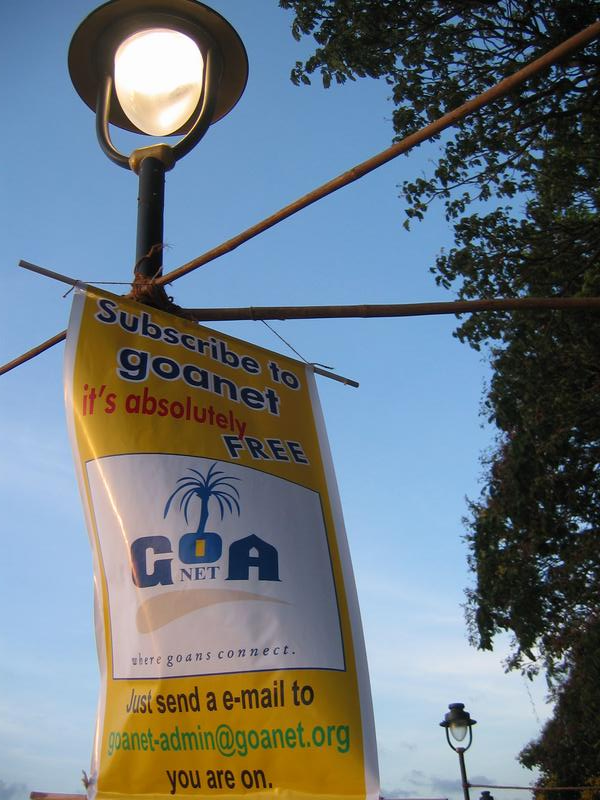
- Goanet poster on a street light
- Website type: Mailing list, website and Facebook page
- Country of origin: India
- Founder: Herman Carneiro
- Website: www.goanet.org
- Users: 5,200 (2004)
- Launched: 25 August 1994; 32 years ago

Goanet is a mailing list related to the state of Goa, located on the western coast of India. It was started in 1994 and, in 2015, celebrated 21 years of operation. Primarily an email-based network (with smaller operations on Facebook and the web), it has been considered influential in connecting Goans across the globe, especially in the diaspora.

== History ==
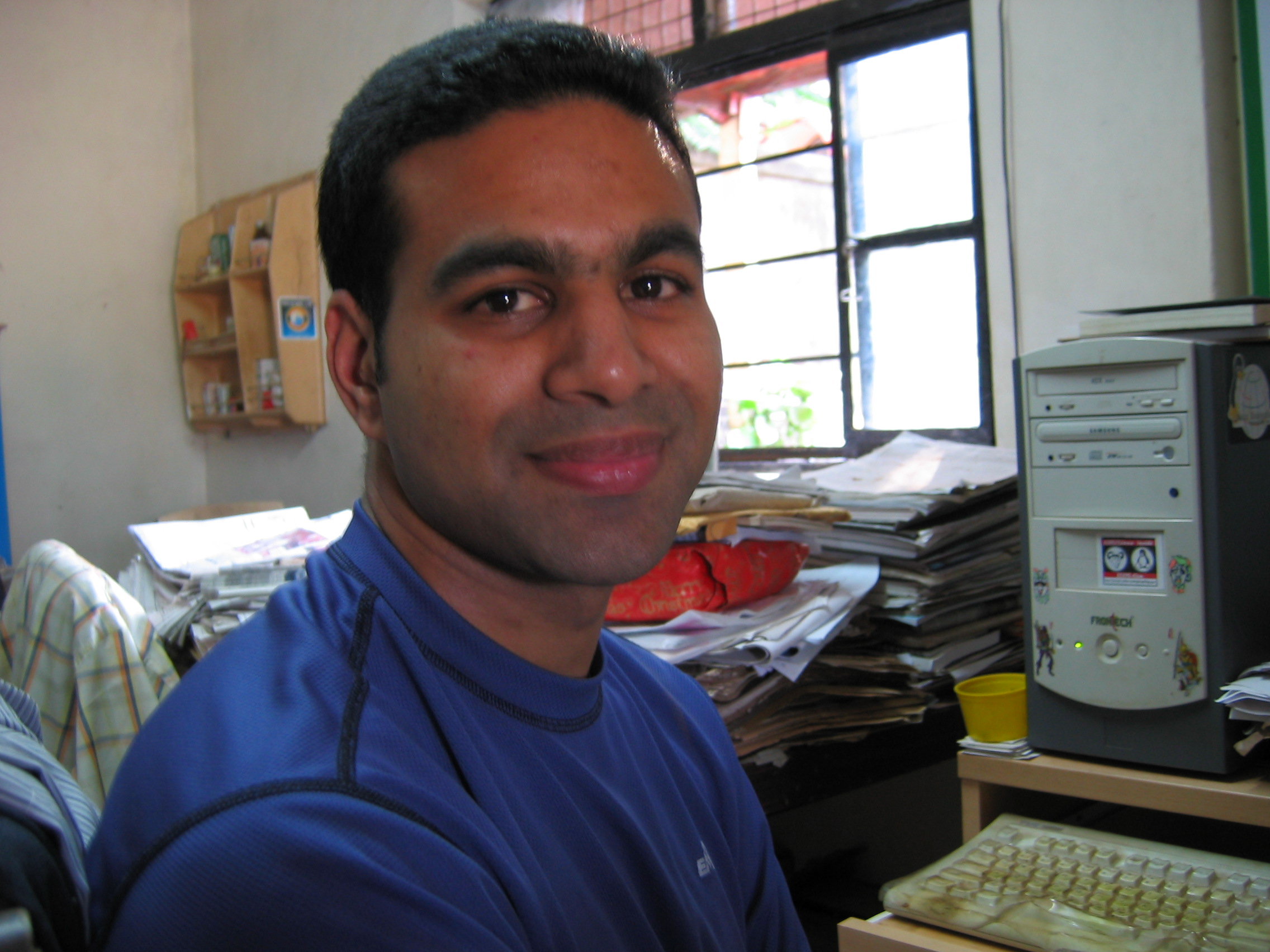
Goanet's founder Herman Carneiro in 2003

It was started in 1994 by a (then) 17-year-old student Herman Carneiro, and since then has grown into being the most influential electronic mailing list linked to Goa.

Carneiro studied Chemical Engineering (Northeastern University in Boston), and has an M.Sc. in Control of Infectious Diseases from the London School of Hygiene & Tropical Medicine. He was at Imperial College, London. He has worked in biomedical research at LeukoSite, Inc. and then at PerSeptive Biosystems, process design at Pharm-Eco laboratories, and capital engineering projects at Kodak. Carneiro was at Whitehead Institute, MIT, where he was a team manager for the Human Genome Project. Later, as part of his Masters-degree program, he designed and carried out a research project for the World Health Organization in Cambodia on sustainable interventions to prevent dengue fever outbreaks in the region. He has also conducted research in new drug discovery at Pfizer, Inc., and has worked for the Massachusetts Department of Public Health as an epidemiologist. Herman has also been a keen sportsman and represented Kenya in the East and Central African Junior Tennis Championships in 1992 and 1993.

=== Launch ===
Goanet was started on 25 August 1994 with approximately 20 members. The mailing list was run from Carneiro's university e-mail account. According to Carneiro: "Netters were asked to put a * in their subject line to indicate a message to be posted on the list as opposed to private e-mail. The list grew slowly but steadily. Pretty soon we had 100 members and by that time I could not cope forwarding all the e-mail. So, I requested that a mailing list program be set up for Goanet on my university's server. I was successful and Goanet found its home for next 4 years."

== On the Goacom server ==
Goanet had real-time archives on the web, and its membership continued to grow steadily. In 1998, Goanet moved to the Goacom server. This allowed Goanet to expand even further. Carneiro has argued that Goanet (also called Goa-Net and GoaNet earlier) has been "more than a mailing list from the start -- it's been a virtual community."

== Run by volunteers ==
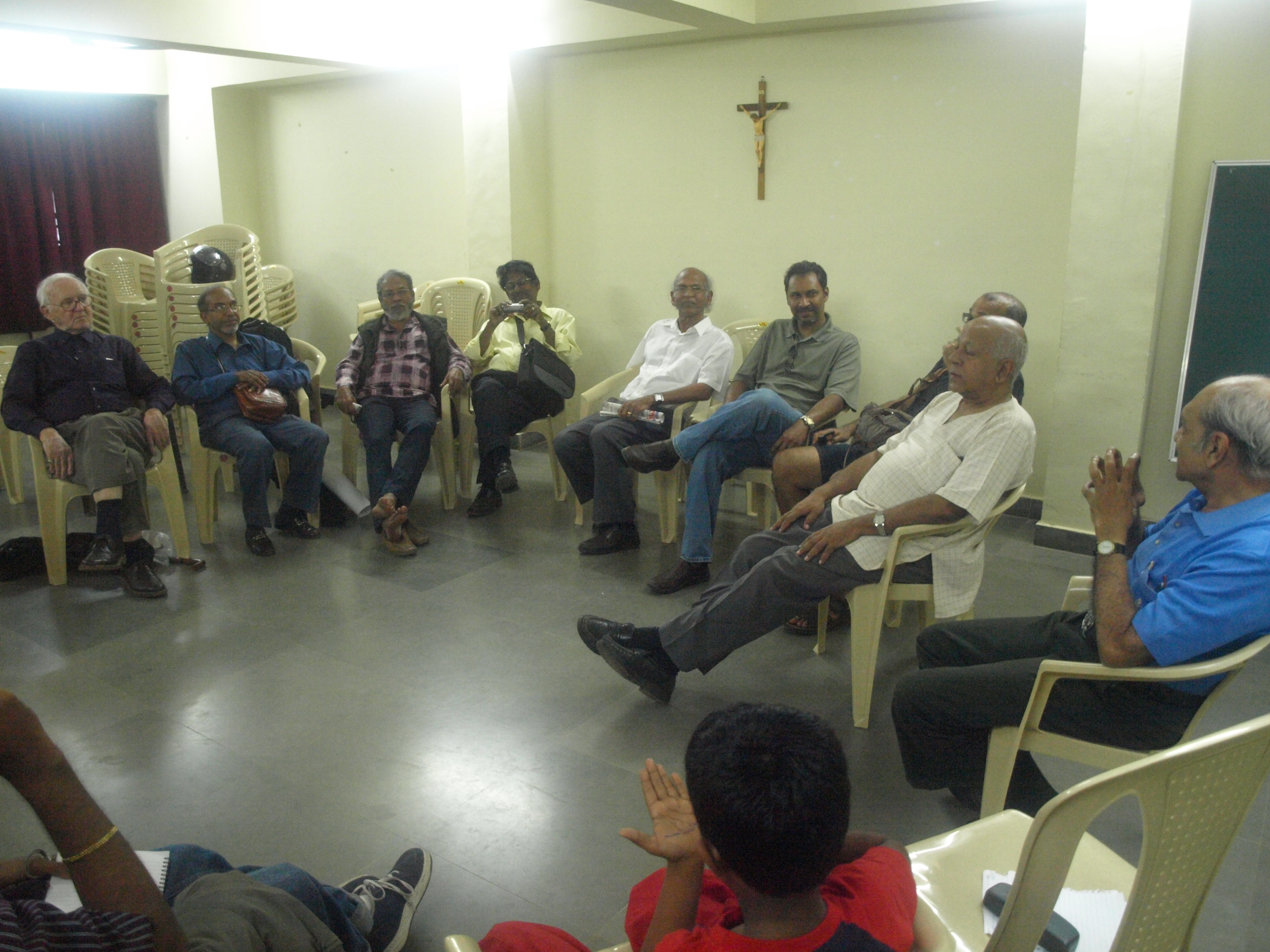
Goanet users meeting in Goa in 2010

Volunteers of Goanet have included Bosco D'Mello (Canada), Eddie Fernandes (UK), Vivian Coelho (USA), Eustaquio Santimano (Denmark), Sunila Muzawar (UAE), Frederick Menezes (Goa), among others. Among the first members were Jacqueline Carneiro (USA), Jeannette Carneiro (USA), Peter D'Souza (USA), Maria D'Souza (USA), Ulysses and Kendy Menezes (Kuwait), Kevin Coutinho, Craig Rodrigues (Canada), Marlon Menezes (US), Brendan Fernandes (Australia), Joanne Fernandes (Australia), Tashlyn Gonzalves (Australia), and Sherwin Nazareth (Australia).

== Outside Goa ==
Goanet has a readership of over 10,000 people each day. In 2004, the network was claiming a membership of "probably... 5200 members, besides others who visit the website" and a readership scattered across some 50 countries worldwide. The list's participants, primarily Goans now living outside of Goa have been involved with a number of initiatives, including an attempt to bring computers to more schools in Goa and efforts by the government to study migration from Goa.

== Built awareness ==
Goanet has built awareness about expat and environmental issues in Goa. It has also inspired the formation of a number of other cyber ventures (particularly e-mail lists) and has also been active in discussing Goan writing and literature. Prominent posters on the list include JoeGoaUk, who is known to share a number of photographs and news reports on a daily basis from Goa itself. Dr. Alberto G. Gomes has written an academic paper on the interactions on Goanet. (‘Going Goan on the Goa-Net: Computer-mediated Communication and Goan Diaspora’. Social Analysis 45 (1), p 53–66)

In 2012, Goanet announced that it had launched Goanet-Femnet to empower women, and was helping campaign to preserve Goa in conjunction with the Save Goa Campaign, UK.
