= Ashvek Vintage World =

Vintage car museum in South Goa, India

Coordinates: 15.3211336°N 73.9414845°E

Ashvek Vintage World is a vintage car museum in South Goa, India. It describes itself as "Goa's first and only vintage car museum and showroom."

== Goals, background ==
It was set up in July 2004, and is the initiative of businessman Pradeep V. Naik (also spelt in some sources as Nayak). Its goal was to "spread awareness about vintage cars amongst the youth". Besides the preservation of vintage cars, it also takes to restoration work.

According to 40kmph.com the venture's owner Pradeep Nayak is a motorcycle dealer by profession, who got involved in the field after his uncle bought an old Mercedez car years ago. He later bought a Peugeot 301 (1931 make) for Rs 3000 in the year 1985, and the collection has since grown. Most of the cars have been got from nearby cities outside of Goa, such as Kolhapur, Sangli or Miraj, and a few were from the Maharaja of Sawantwadi in Maharashtra, located just outside the Goa border.

It has also been described as "dedicated to restore and preserve motoring and motorcycling gems of historical interest in Goa" and the price for entry to the Nuvem (Salcete)-based venture was Rs 50 in 2005.

== Other events ==
The collection of vintage cars has also taken part in other events, for instance in auto expos. Vehicles listed as participating include "a convertible Chevrolet, convertible Morris 8, Morris 8 Saloon, Baby Austin, a very rare 4-door Morris Minor Pickup and the very special Volkswagen Beetle four-door limousine."

== Models available ==
Among the models it currently has are the following:

- 1931 Peugeot
- 1948 Chevrolet Fleet Master
- Rare two-engine Vandall tempo
- 1961 Datsun Fairlady
- Morris 8
- 1939 Mercedes 170

== Timings ==
It is open from 10 am to 1 pm, and from 3 pm to 5.30 pm, but closed on Sundays and other holidays.

== Little known facts ==
- Parts are occasionally got from auto-jumble sales in places as far away as the United Kingdom and Germany.
- Some vehicles from this vintage collection has been deployed in movies too
- In April 2004, the team behind the museum organised a vintage car rally, and later, a Mercedes car rally
- The owners say they care keen to buy old model cars and bikes if available on sale, specially those from around the 1930s or 1940s
- 'Goa: A Cultural Guide' that was compiled by Rudolf Ludwig Kammermeier also lists this centre among its cultural guide to Goa
- Some cars that have been restored are hired out for weddings, shootings for movies or joy rides. It has organised vintage car rallies in Goa, and also undertakes restoration of vintage cars that belong to others. According to the official blog, a "1928 Ford belonging to Rauraje Deshprabhu of Pernem, as well as an attractive Austin belonging to Jaywant Chowgule are just some of the vehicles that have been restored here."
