= JoeGoaUk =

Portuguese photojournalist and online activist

- Born: 10 October 1960s
- Other name: Joe Pereira
- Citizenship: India (former); Portugal
- Occupations: Correspondent; photographer; photojournalist; online activist
- Years active: 2003–present
- Known for: Enterprise journalism
- Children: 3

YouTube information
- Channel: JoeGoaUk
- Genres: Travel; lifestyle; vlog
- Subscribers: 112 thousand
- Views: 63.22 million
- Last updated: 10 March 2026
- Website: goa-joegoauk.blogspot.com

Signature
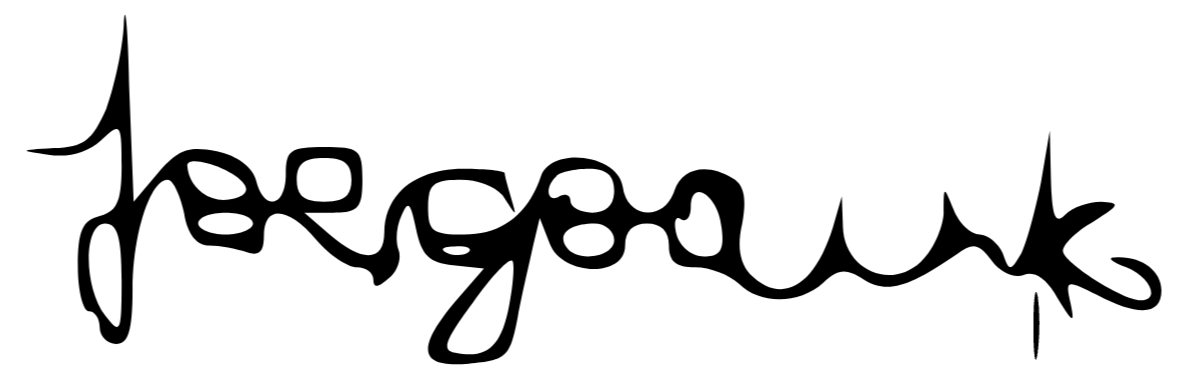

JoeGoaUk is a pseudonymous Portuguese correspondent, photographer, photojournalist, and online activist based in Goa, India. He has made significant contributions to the online sphere over the course of two decades. JoeGoaUk's contributions include sharing a vast collection of photographs and videos that span various genres, including citizen journalism, cultural documentation, political commentary, Konkani Mog, (Note: (transl. Konkani Love)) locavore connoisseurship, and train spotting enthusiasm.

JoeGoaUk extensively documents Goan culture, employing networks like Goanet, as well as archival platforms like Flickr and YouTube. His extensive collection of images featuring restaurant-style fish curry and rice plates is regarded as an artistic and cultural accomplishment. JoeGoaUk is recognized for his altruistic approach in sharing the photographs that he captures and the written texts that he produces. His consistent request is to be credited appropriately, often through a by-line, to ensure proper recognition of his authorship.

== Career ==
In the field of contemporary journalism, JoeGoaUk possesses a comprehensive collection of information that captures the culture of the present era and is continuously updated in near-real-time. Writer and journalist Vivek Menezes praises JoeGoaUk's approach to investigative reporting, particularly in areas of great societal significance such as urban infrastructure, essential commodity prices, public transportation in all its facets, and the intricate workings of bureaucratic processes. Menezes further stated that it is important to acknowledge that JoeGoaUk's offerings of "news you can use", in areas of his interests, is itself larger than all the traditional media outlets combined.

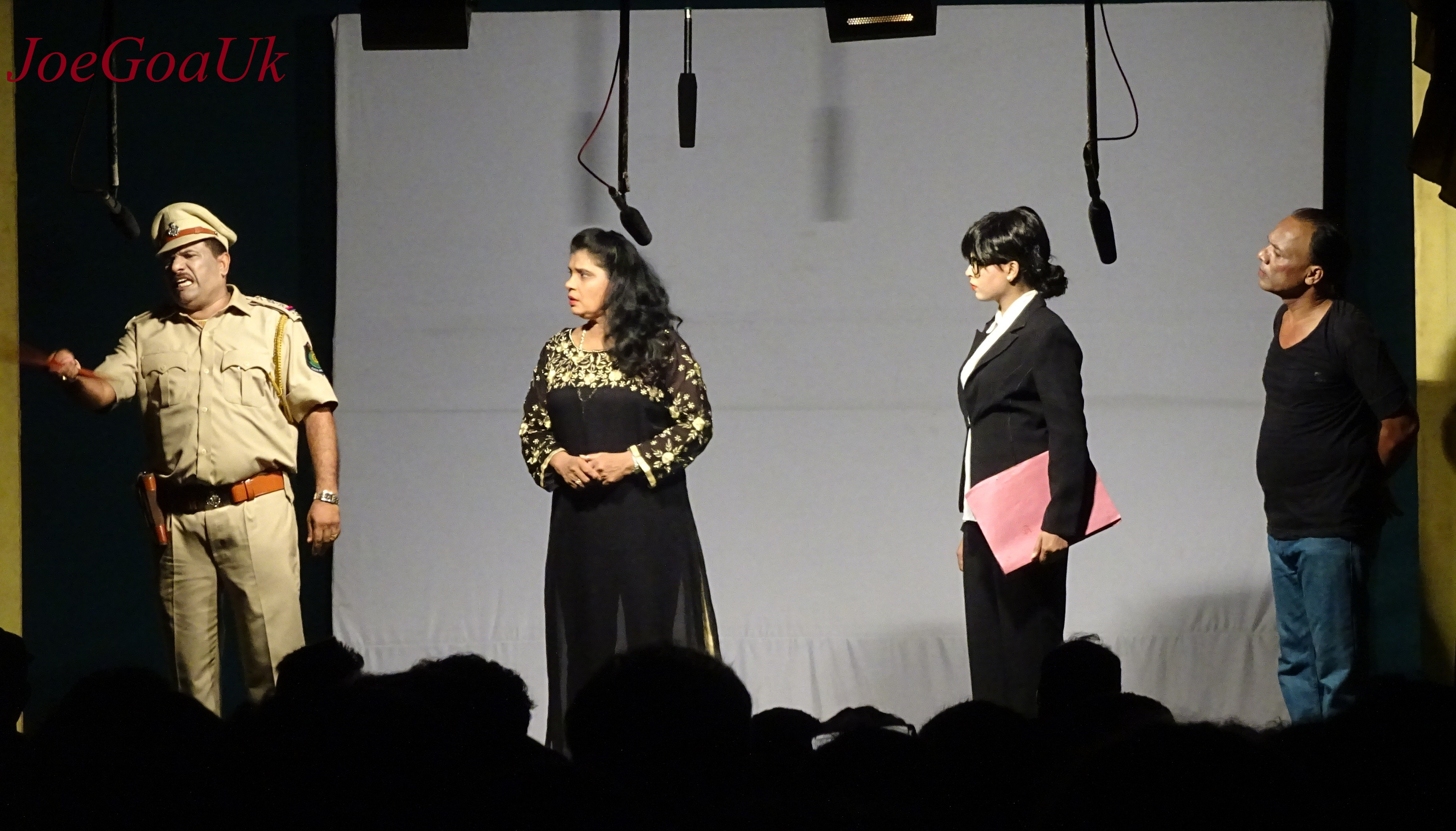
A still photograph captured by JoeGoaUk from the tiatr titled "Question Mark" in 2016

According to Frederick Noronha, an experienced journalist, cameras have limitations in capturing the entirety of a story. However, JoeGoaUk excels in reporting on grassroots issues and providing insights into culture, particularly of tiatrs, despite facing some criticism. Noronha further states that JoeGoaUk's case is notable for his extensive coverage across various subjects and locations, without any financial compensation.

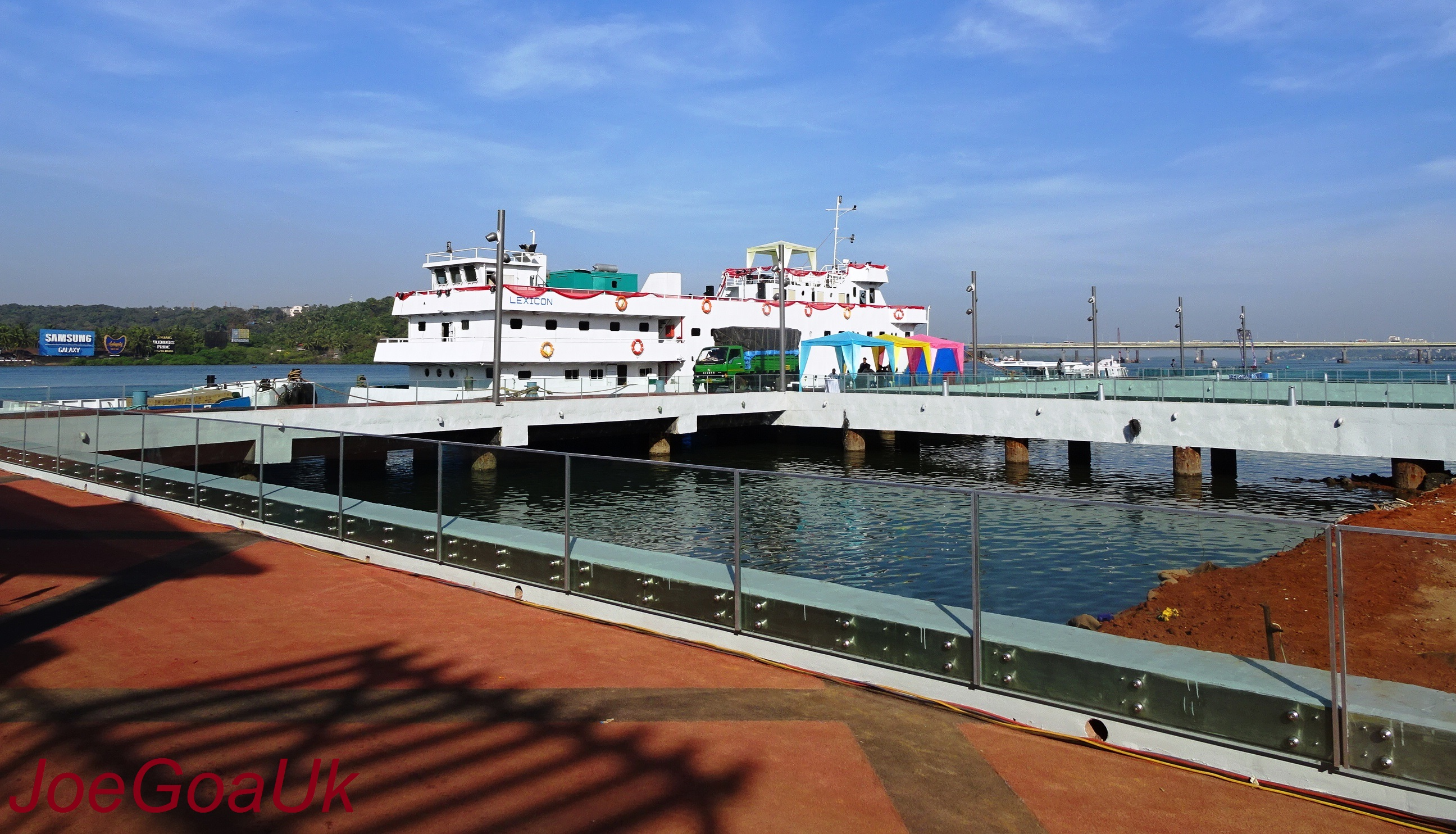
Captain of Ports jetty at Panjim, 2015

JoeGoaUk's extensive archive demonstrated its value across various contexts. A notable instance was highlighted by Valmiki Naik, a member of the Aam Admi Party's national council. Naik shared an example where he was engaged in a legal battle against the construction of the controversial Captain of Ports terminal building within the Mandovi waters. While the state authorities argued that it was merely a reconstruction, Naik had a different understanding. Naik then used JoeGoaUk's archive, which had photographs of the old terminal from multiple different angles, along with drone imagery, to successfully substantiate his claim that the construction was not a reconstruction but an entirely new structure within the river waters, rather than on land.

JoeGoaUk has written for Goa-based publications such as O Heraldo. His work is also featured in two books: The Waste Crisis: Roadmap for Sustainable Waste Management in Developing Countries and Skin- Friendly Skin Care: Make Your Own Cleansers, Moisturizers, and Toners.

=== Fish Curry Rice series ===
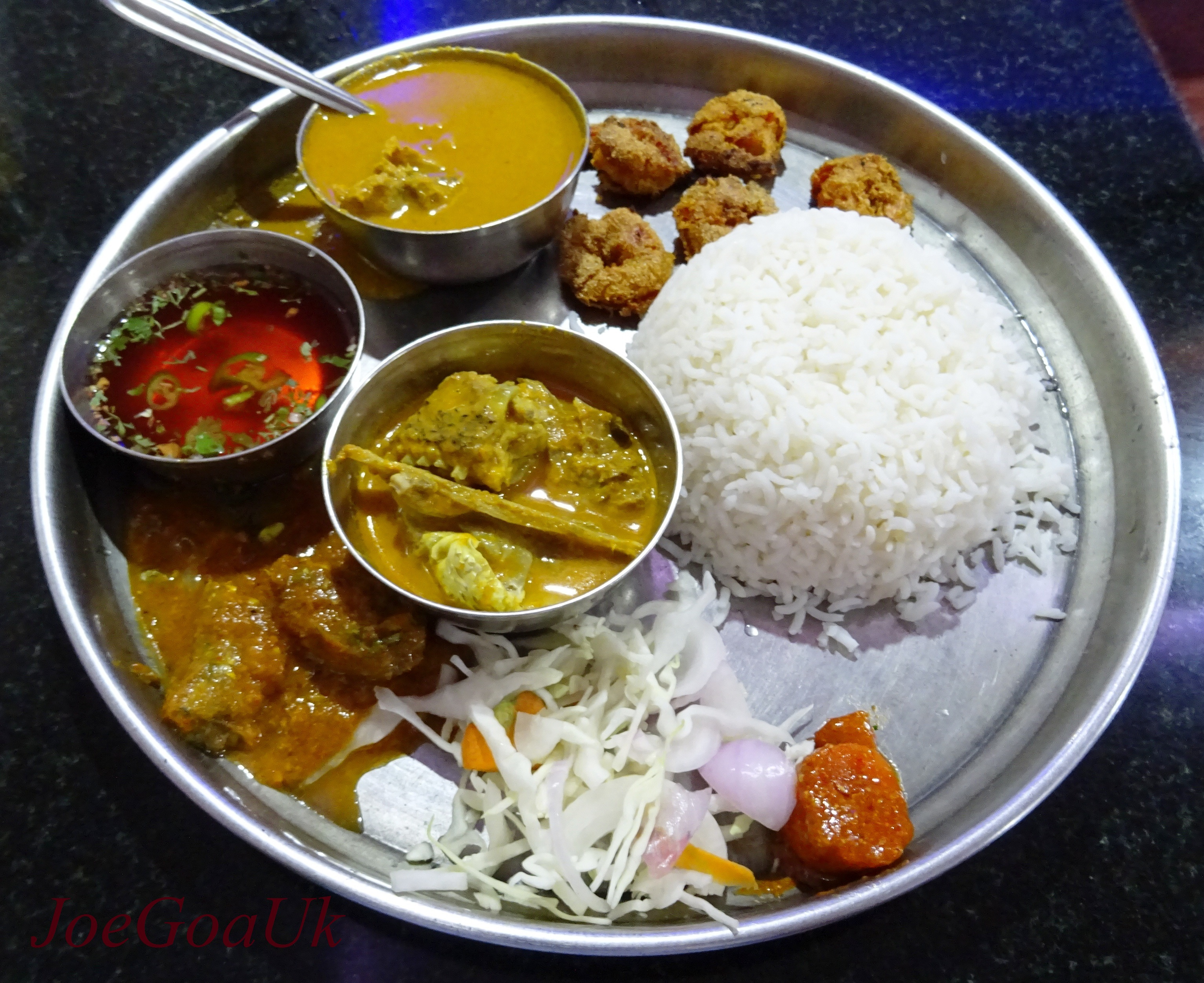
JoeGoaUk's photograph of a Fish Curry Rice Thali, taken in 2017

The Fish Curry Rice series by JoeGoaUk, which can be found in various locations on Flickr, is regarded as a collection deserving of recognition at a biennale by Menezes. Each image within the series showcases annotated fish thalis and multiple accompanying dishes from numerous local establishments. Menezes further describes this series as "one of the greatest contemporary artworks about Goan identity".

== Personal life ==
Not much is known about JoeGoaUk's personal life. He is described as a senior citizen who was born on 10 October, sometime in the 1960s. He is married to a homemaker, the couple has two sons and a daughter. As of June 2020, JoeGoaUk has been residing in Goa following his return from the United Kingdom. He holds Portuguese citizenship.

== Style ==
Vivek Menezes of O Heraldo states that JoeGoaUk's photography is characterized by a simple, unapologetic approach, contrary to the usual pursuit of Instagram-friendly aesthetics. Certain aspects of his work traverse the boundaries of galleries and museums.

== Reception ==
=== Input ===
According to journalist Frederick Noronha, in order for creative works to have a lasting impact, it is recommended that individuals consider adopting Creative Commons licenses. Noronha suggests that JoeGoaUk, for instance, could share his work on platforms such as Wikipedia or Archive.org, which serve as free global archives. It is important, of course, to give proper credit for such works, as it can be frustrating when people simply appropriate and reuse them.

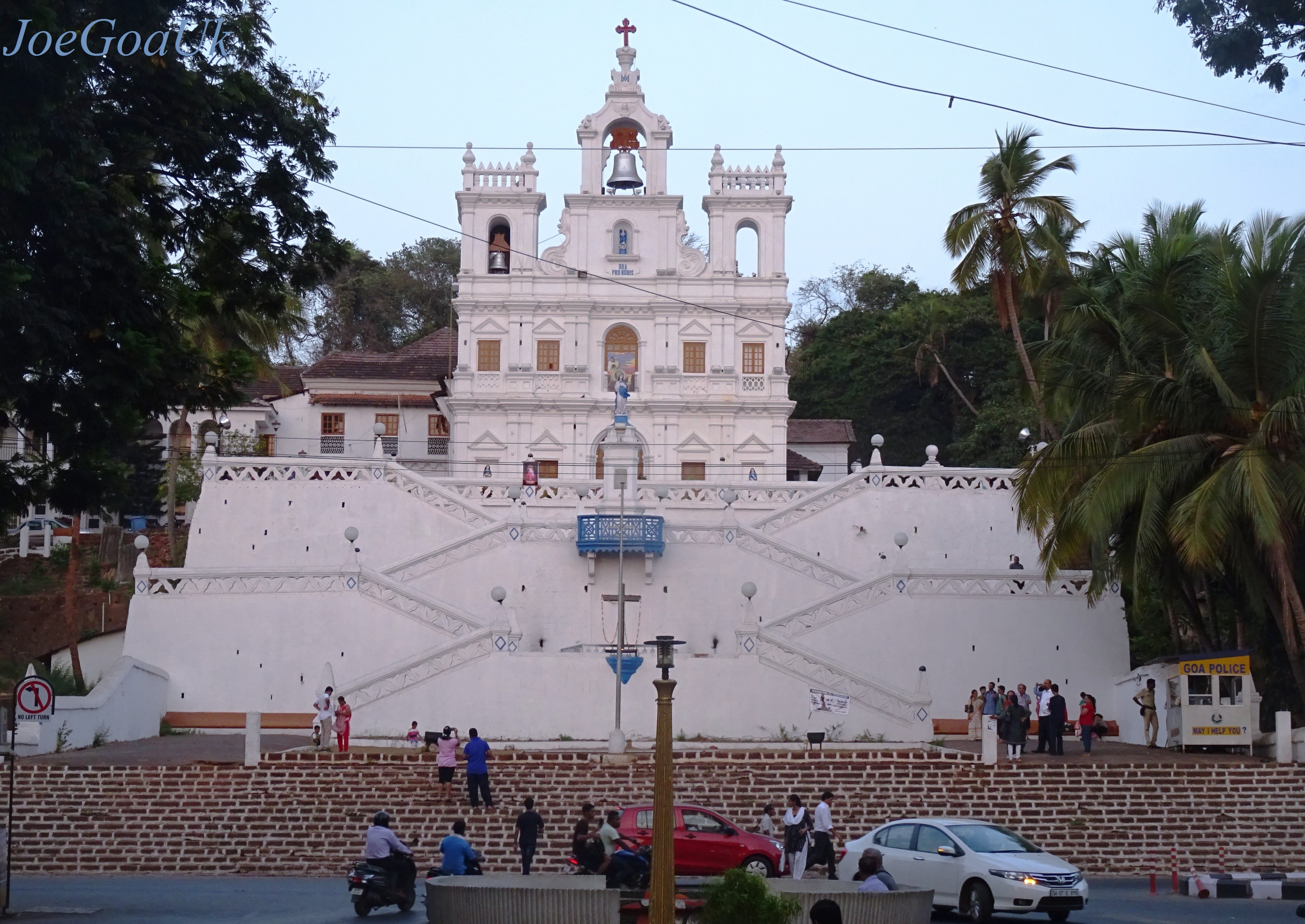
JoeGoaUk's photograph of Immaculate Conception Church in Panjim, taken in 2016

Naik expresses his belief that JoeGoaUk has a deep affection for Panjim, as well as Goa as a whole, and is motivated to extensively document various aspects of the region, regardless of whether they are positive, negative, or unsightly. However, Naik also emphasizes the need for citizens to harness this valuable repository of information in order to preserve what is rapidly being lost. Naik likens JoeGoaUk to the street artist Banksy, as he creates his own distinctive form of art through photojournalism and online activism.

=== 2010 debate ===
In 18 April 2010, a significant discussion unfolded during a gathering hosted by the Tiatr Academy of Goa, centering around the identity of JoeGoaUk. While JoeGoaUk garnered praise for his online contributions, there were occasional dissenting opinions, including those expressed by Noronha. Notably, JoeGoaUk chose to maintain anonymity, a decision that both intrigued and unsettled readers. This deliberate concealment of identity was accompanied by a lighthearted approach, reminiscent of the character the Scarlet Pimpernel.

In regards to the subject of Goa-related content, Noronha expressed a lack of personal concern. However, he acknowledged the substantial benefit of individuals sharing a significant amount of Goa-related content online. He further highlighted the noteworthy achievement of Goa in utilizing social initiatives to collaboratively disseminate a considerable volume of its content, thereby increasing its visibility to a global audience.

Noronha observed JoeGoaUk's multimedia blend of text, photographs, and videos offered valuable insights into the current affairs of Goa. The content showcased a diverse range of subjects, including images of seasonal fruits and traditional Goan practices that are gradually being forgotten. However, some individuals raised concerns about these posts. One particular objection questioned the identity of JoeGoaUk, implying that the anonymity and unwillingness to disclose personal information may raise suspicions about potential ulterior motives or questionable intentions.

=== Copyright issues ===
In the realm of Konkani music and theater, copyright issues occasionally arise, as noted by Noronha. Tiatrists and Konkani cantarists, encountered challenges regarding copyright protection for their work. JoeGoaUk made notable contributions to enhance the online visibility of these artists, including curating listings of the latest Konkani VCD releases. However, some individuals perceive the act of recording these performances as a potential violation of copyright and a disturbance to the smooth execution of their programs.

According to Noronha's perspective, the technical accuracy of copyright laws should be acknowledged, even though their implementation can sometimes be perplexing. However, Noronha emphasizes that the underlying motives hold greater significance in this context. While it may appear that others are profiting significantly from the hard work of content creators, the reality is that sharing content on the Internet is a laborious, time-consuming process that often yields minimal financial returns. While it can grant generous individuals heightened visibility and popularity within certain circles, the notion that substantial monetary gains are being garnered from such activities is far from accurate.

=== Hoskote's critique ===
In October 2022, Ranjit Hoskote, an art critic, curator, and cultural theorist, expressed his appreciation to Menezes for acquainting him with the artistic creations of JoeGoaUk. Menezes had shared a link to JoeGoaUk's photographs, accompanied by a fundamental query: "Is it art?" Hoskote's response not only affirmed the artistic nature of JoeGoaUk's work but also acknowledged its resonance within the current creative landscape, characterized by diverse mediums and platforms.

Hoskote observed an intriguing interplay between the transient and the lasting elements within JoeGoaUk's imagery. For instance, through a meticulous portrayal of various meals, JoeGoaUk crafted a broader narrative that delved into topics such as appetites, culinary traditions, evolving cuisines, and the delicate equilibrium between tradition and innovation. Apart from their archival value, JoeGoaUk's photographs served as vibrant and authentic representations of everyday culture, providing a compilation of gastronomic specialties and culinary establishments. Consequently, they became an essential resource for enthusiasts of the culinary arts.

Hoskote highlighted the notable importance of anonymity, camouflage, and masking within the realm of contemporary art. According to his observations, these elements have gained considerable significance in artistic practices since the 1960s. Drawing insightful connections, he draws parallels between artists such as the Guerrilla Girls and Banksy, who employ interventionist approaches inspired by paramilitary insurgent protocols. In the context of classical art, anonymity was often perceived through a broader existential lens, where creativity was seen as a divine bestowal rather than solely credited to a specific human creator. However, Hoskote highlights that even within this context, historical evidence such as mason marks found in ancient and medieval Indian temple architecture suggests that humans have always found ways to assert their presence and agency, disregarding prevailing customs. Furthermore, Hoskote situates JoeGoaUk's Fish Curry Rice series within a spectrum of iterative art practices, ranging from the high-conceptual everyday practice of On Kawara to various practices that celebrate the rhythmic interplay between routine and surprise inherent in everyday activities.

Menezes inquired of Hoskote whether it was feasible to envision Indian art in the 21st century in a manner that encompasses JoeGoaUk's artistic endeavors. Hoskote affirmed, "Certainly! Art cannot thrive within rigid and self-affirming definitions at any given period. What truly renders art significant, pertinent, and vibrant is an inherent openness to experimental forms and an inquisitiveness regarding novel and even radical ways in which the creative imagination engages with lived experiences." Hoskote acknowledged the challenge of devising exhibition formats-be they physical, online, or hybrid-that can effectively bear witness to such artistic practices. In light of this, he expressed enthusiasm for Goa to celebrate the artistic contributions of JoeGoaUk.

== Awards ==
In January 2011, JoeGoaUk was honored with the Goan Volunteer Service Icon Award for the year 2010 by the NGO, Goa Sudharop. This recognition was bestowed upon him in Panjim, Goa in appreciation of his endeavors to raise awareness about various aspects of Goan culture and lifestyle, both within the local community and on an international scale.
