= Sunaparanta, Goa Centre for the Arts =

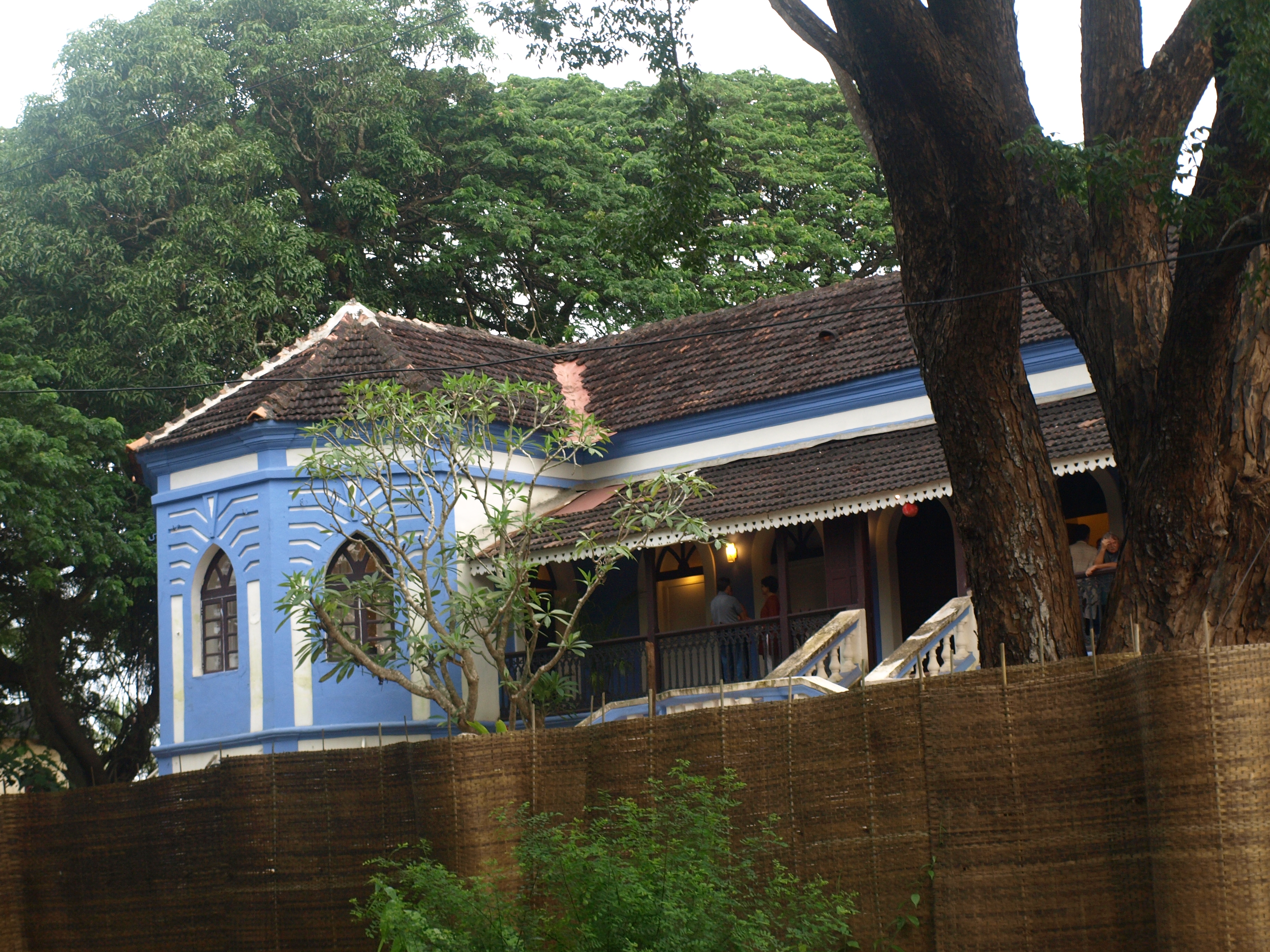
- Sunaparanta, Goa Centre for the Arts
- Location: Altinho, Panjim, Goa
- Coordinates: 15°29′38″N 73°49′39″E
- Type: Art gallery
- Website: sgcfa.org

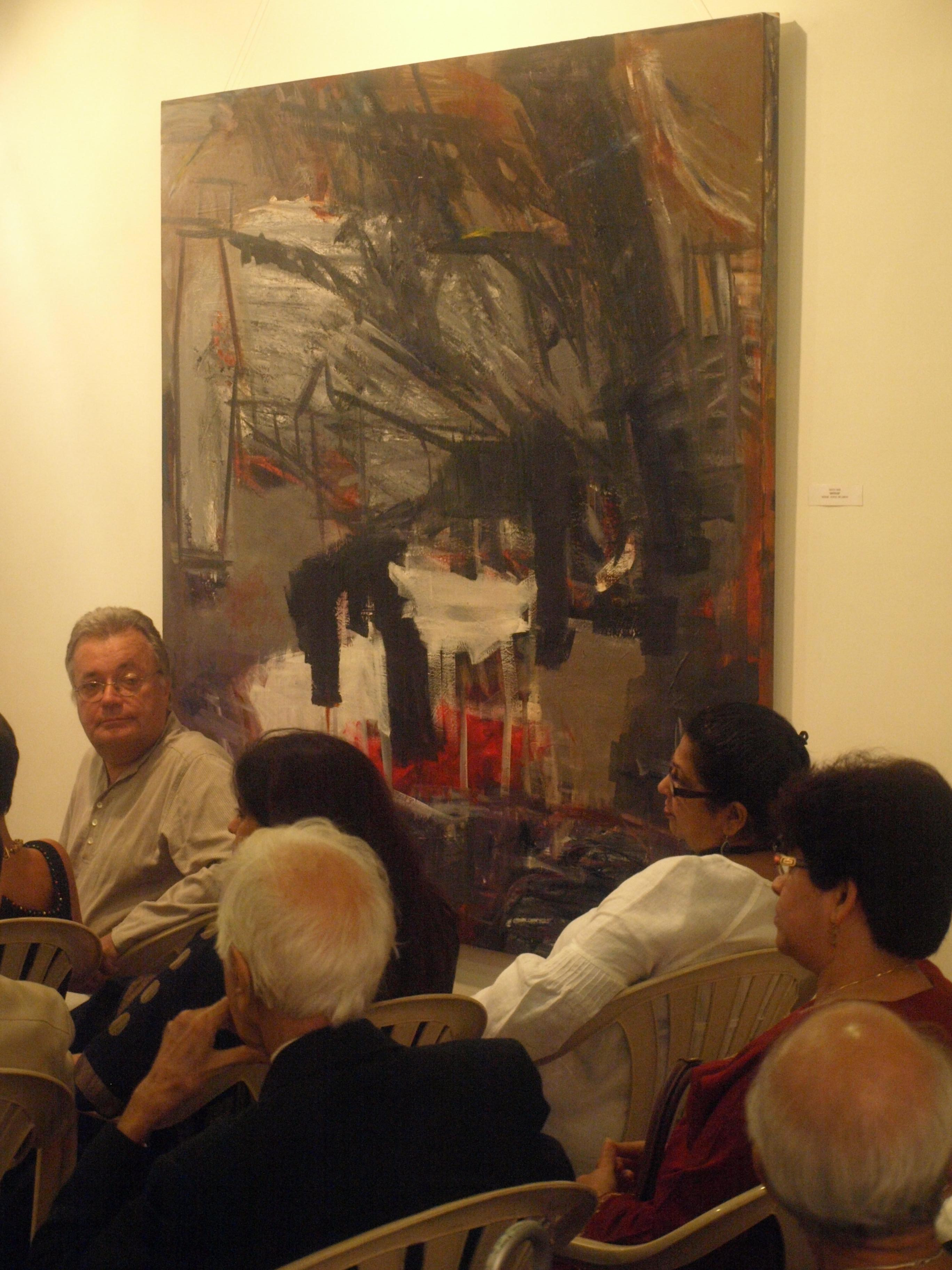
Event at Sunaparanta

Sunaparanta, Goa Centre for the Arts is a cultural centre in Altinho, Panjim, Goa. Its official website describes it as a "non-profit, process-based initiative to encourage creation, learning, understanding, appreciation and enjoyment of the visual arts through education and dialogue in Goa".

== Facilities ==
The centre has exhibition galleries, space for workshops and lectures, studios, two residency rooms for visiting scholars, artists and faculty, an open-air amphitheatre, an outdoor courtyard that houses the Café Al Fresco and a gallery for emerging artists. An art resource library is being set up for art students.

== Location ==
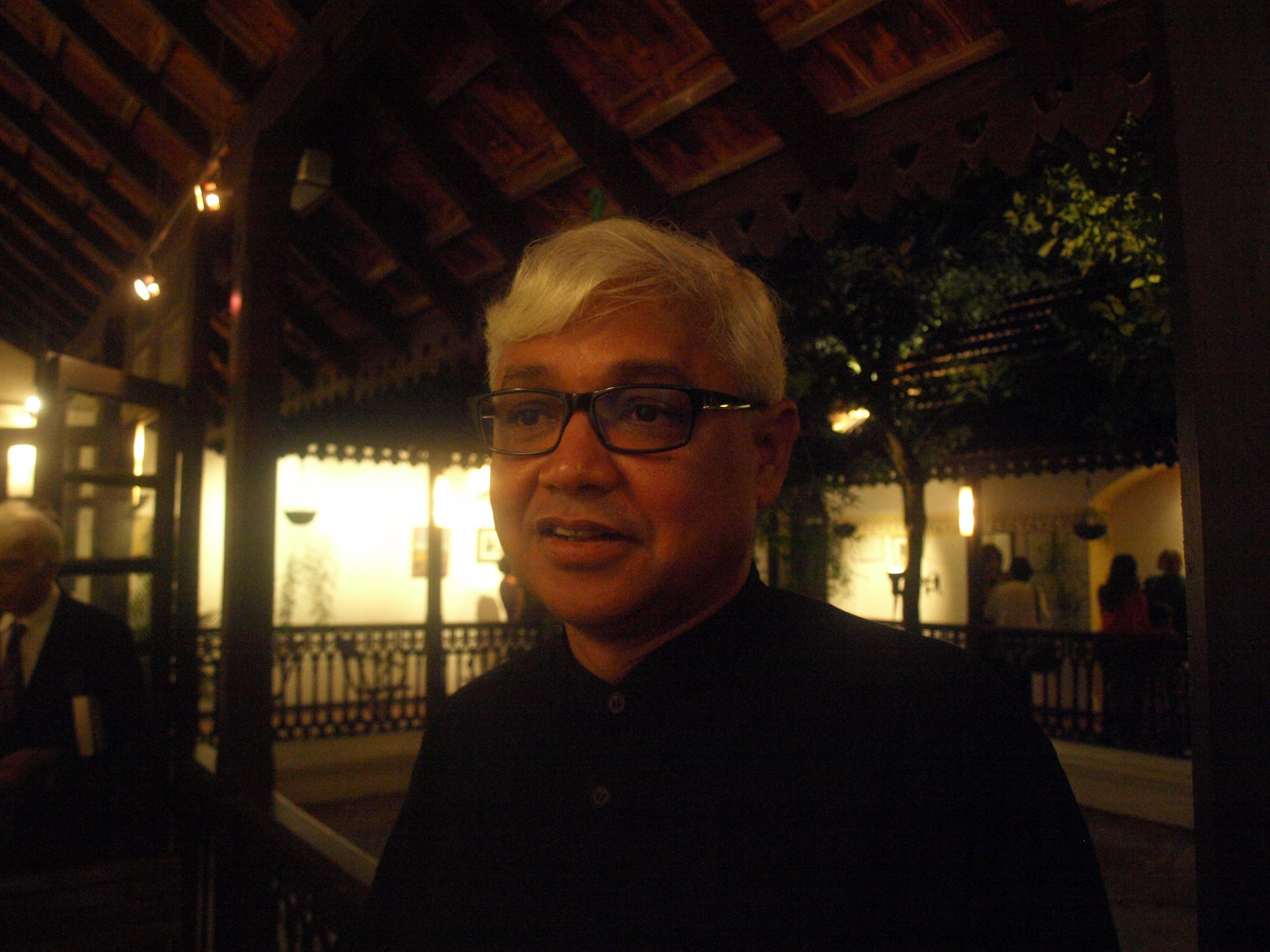
Writer Amitav Ghosh at Sunaparanta

It is located in the picturesque Altinho hills atop the Goan capital of Panjim in Ilhas. The nearest landmark is the local hostel called the Lar de Estudantes.

== Background ==
Sunaparanta was set up by industrialist Dattaraj Salgaocar. Its aims and objectives, according to the institution, is "to preserve the artistic and legacies of Goa, to encourage, sponsor and promote innovative work in the visual arts, to serve as a bridge between the Goan art community and the national and international art communities and, most importantly, to provide resource support to art students and others interested in art."

Activities include a Sketch Club, Film for Thought (documentary and art films), the Mango Tree after-school visual art class for children, a children’s Theatre Club, Open Studio—a full-time ceramics studio and an ongoing programme of varied workshops, activities and events in creative arts.

== Panel, committees ==
Sunaparanta's chairman is industrialist Dattaraj Salgaocar and its vice-chairperson is Dipti Salgaocar.

Its advisory board consists of Prafulla Dahanukar, Dilip De, Dr. Vidya Dehejia, Dr. Saryu Doshi (chairperson), Pheroza J Godrej, Margaret Mascarenhas (convenor), Dattaraj Salgaocar, Dipti Salgaocar, Rajeev Sethi, Anwar Siddiqi, Tasneem Mehta, Abhay Sardesai, and Jitish Kallat.

The project directors are Shamoli Barreto and Elizabeth Kemp, the administrative head is Nilima Kamat Menezes, and the secretary and programme coordinator is Justina Costa.

== Photo gallery ==
Sunaparanta, Goa Centre for the Arts

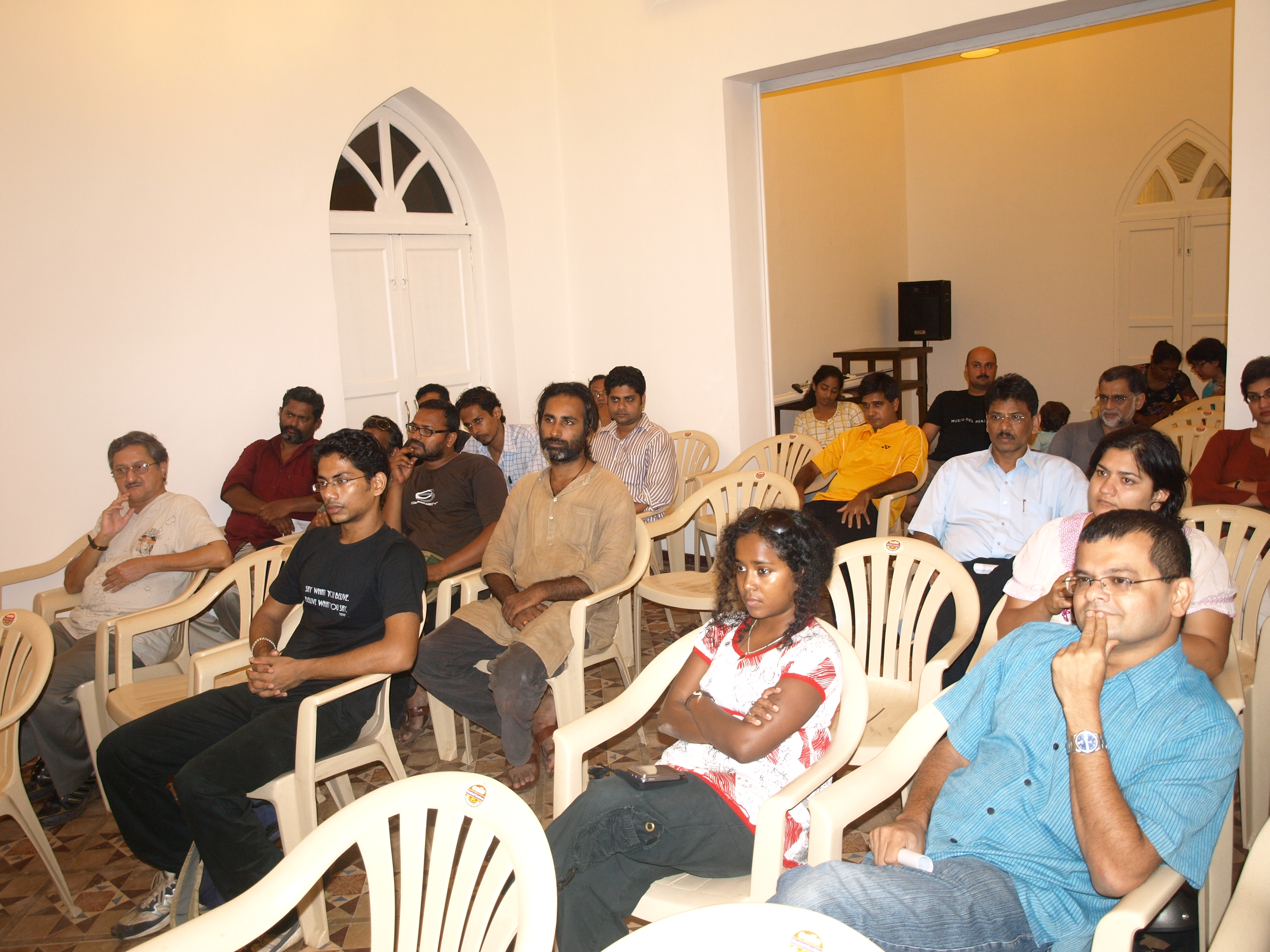

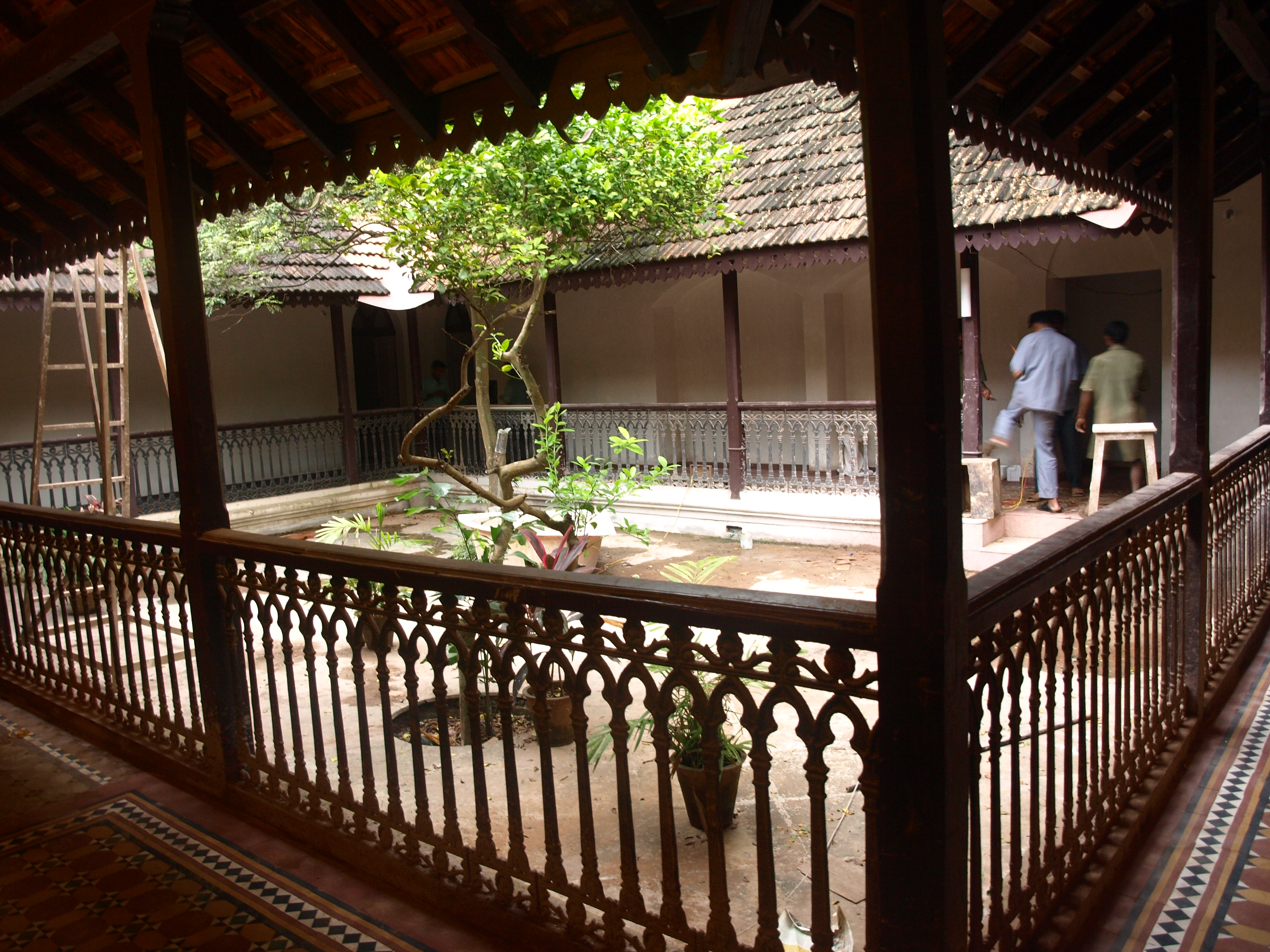

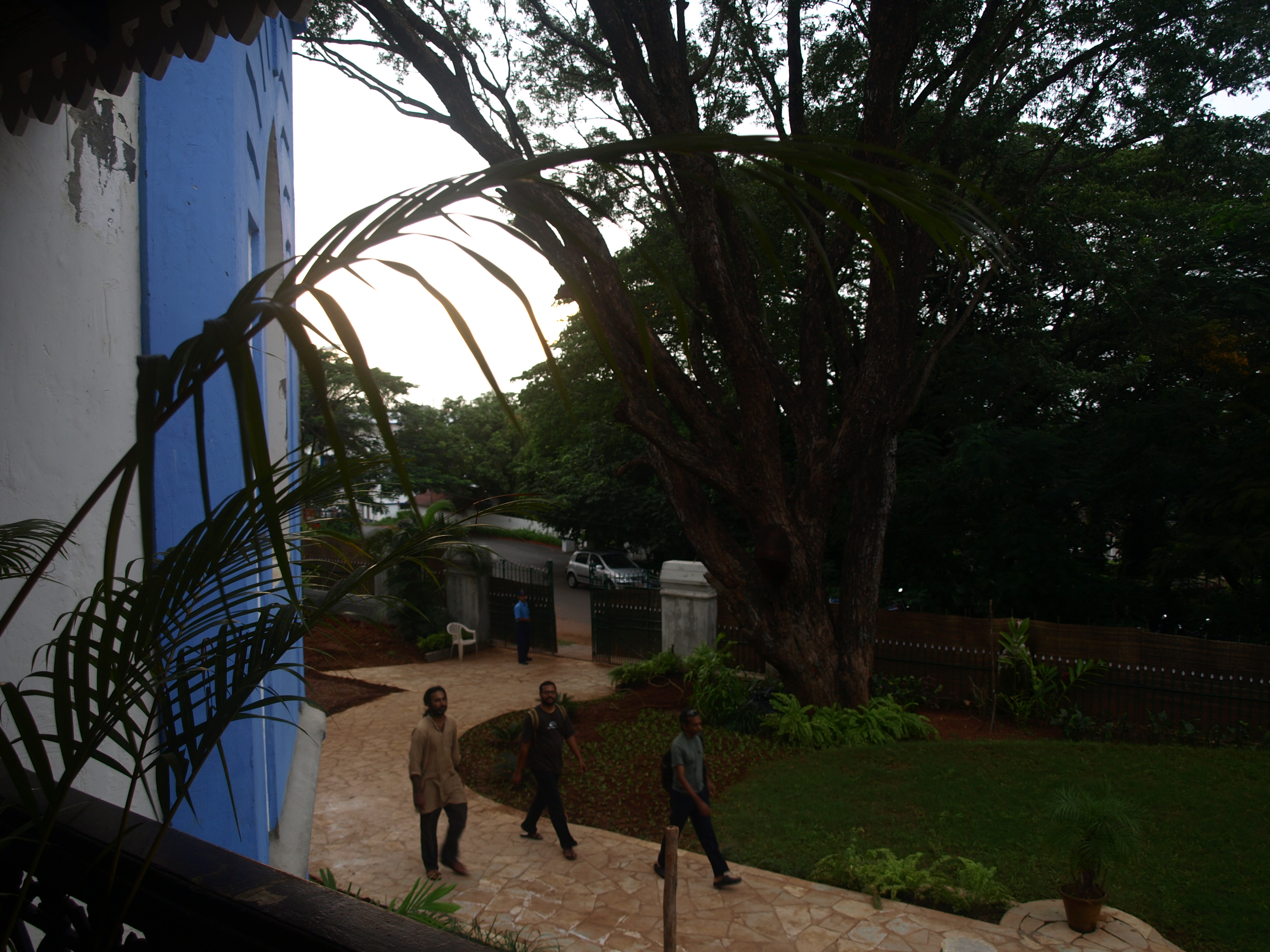

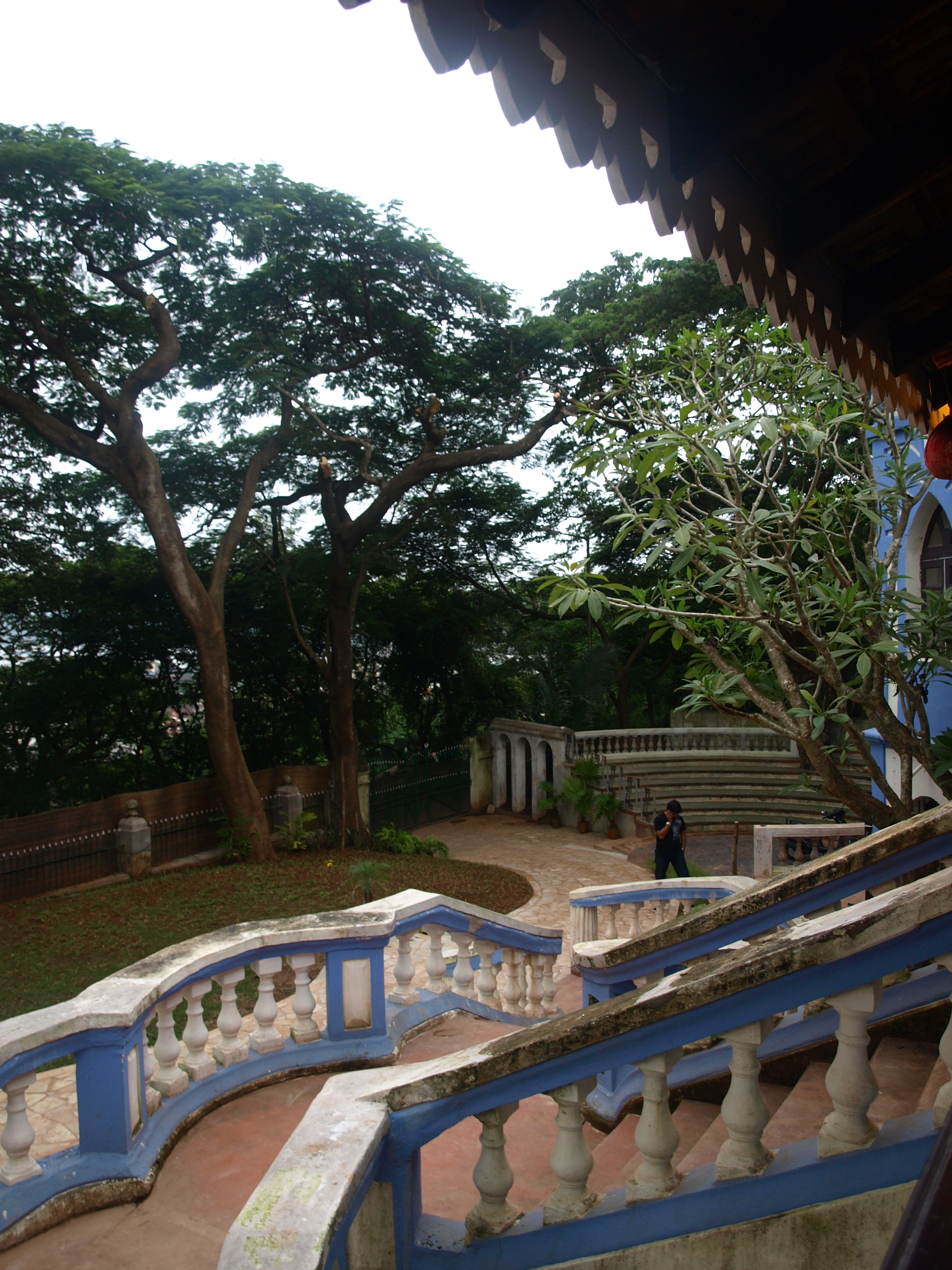

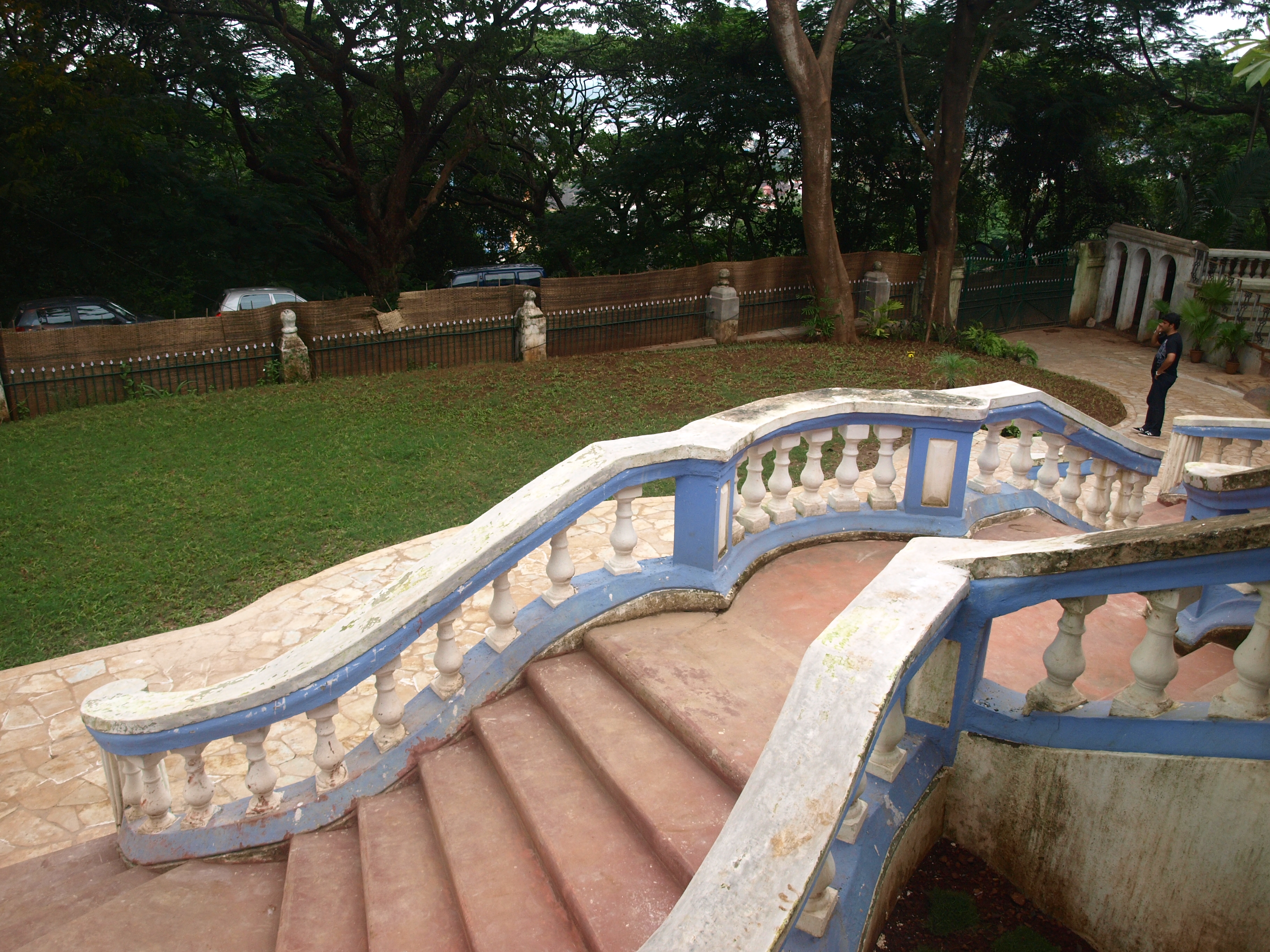

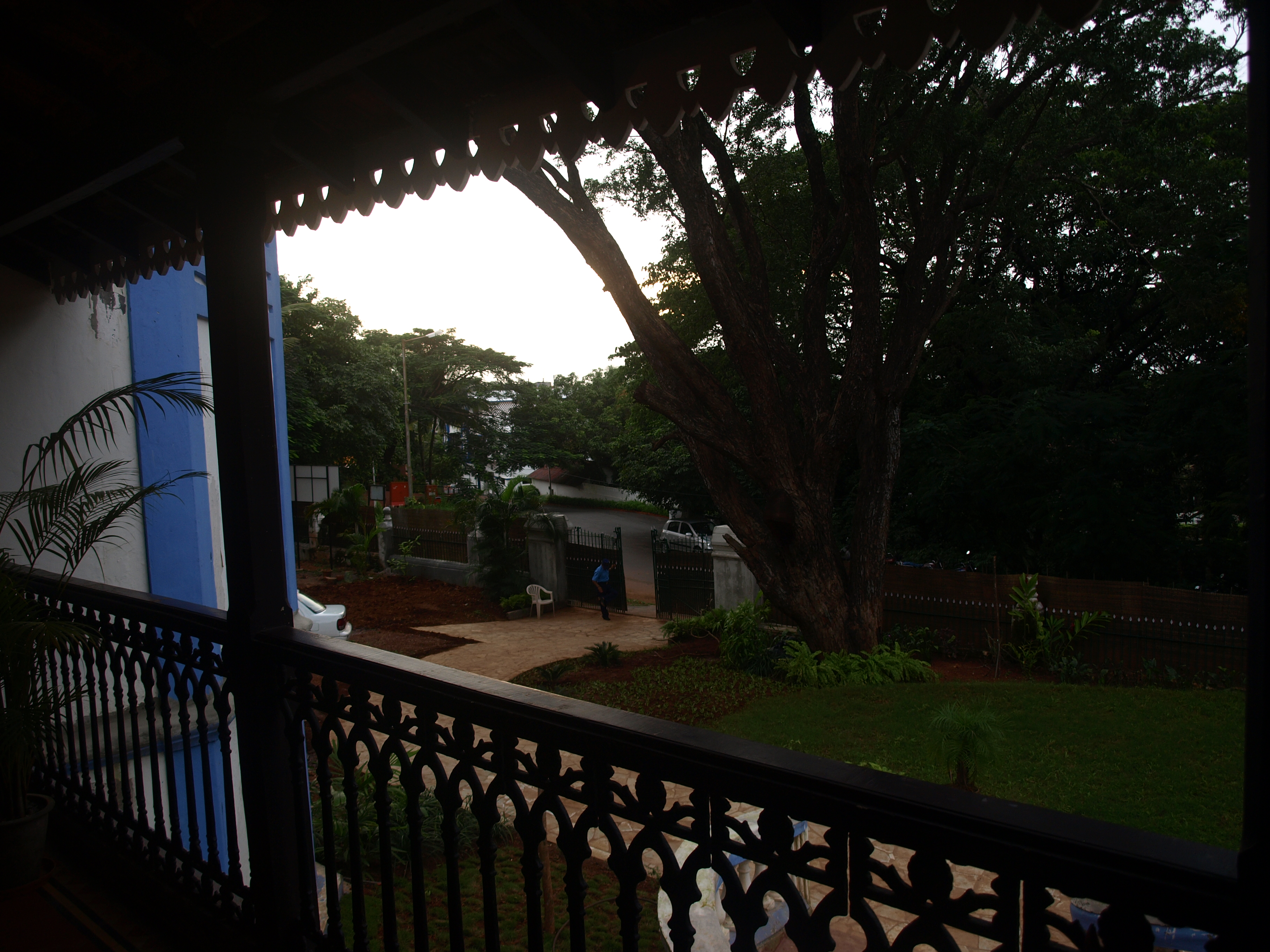

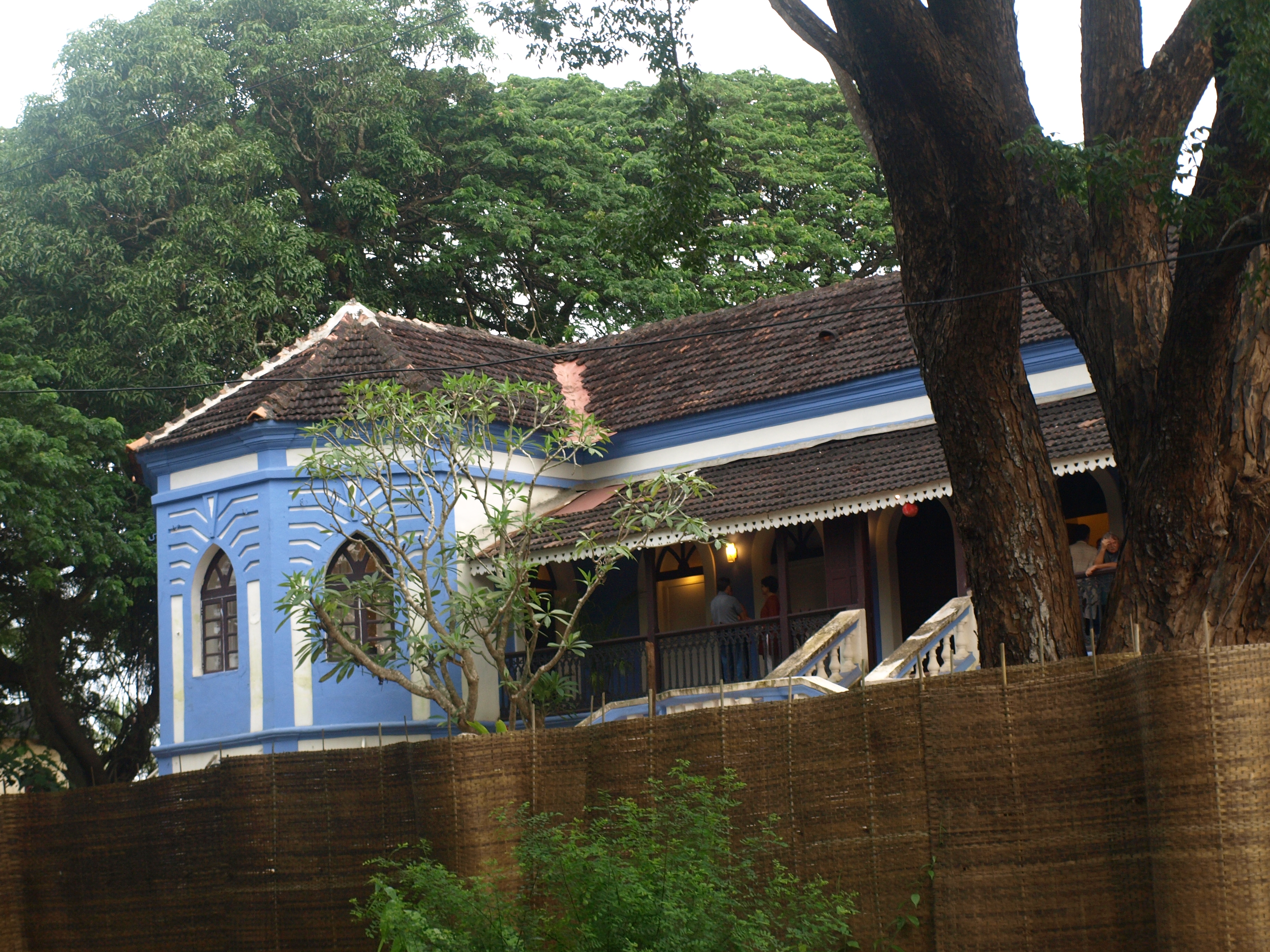

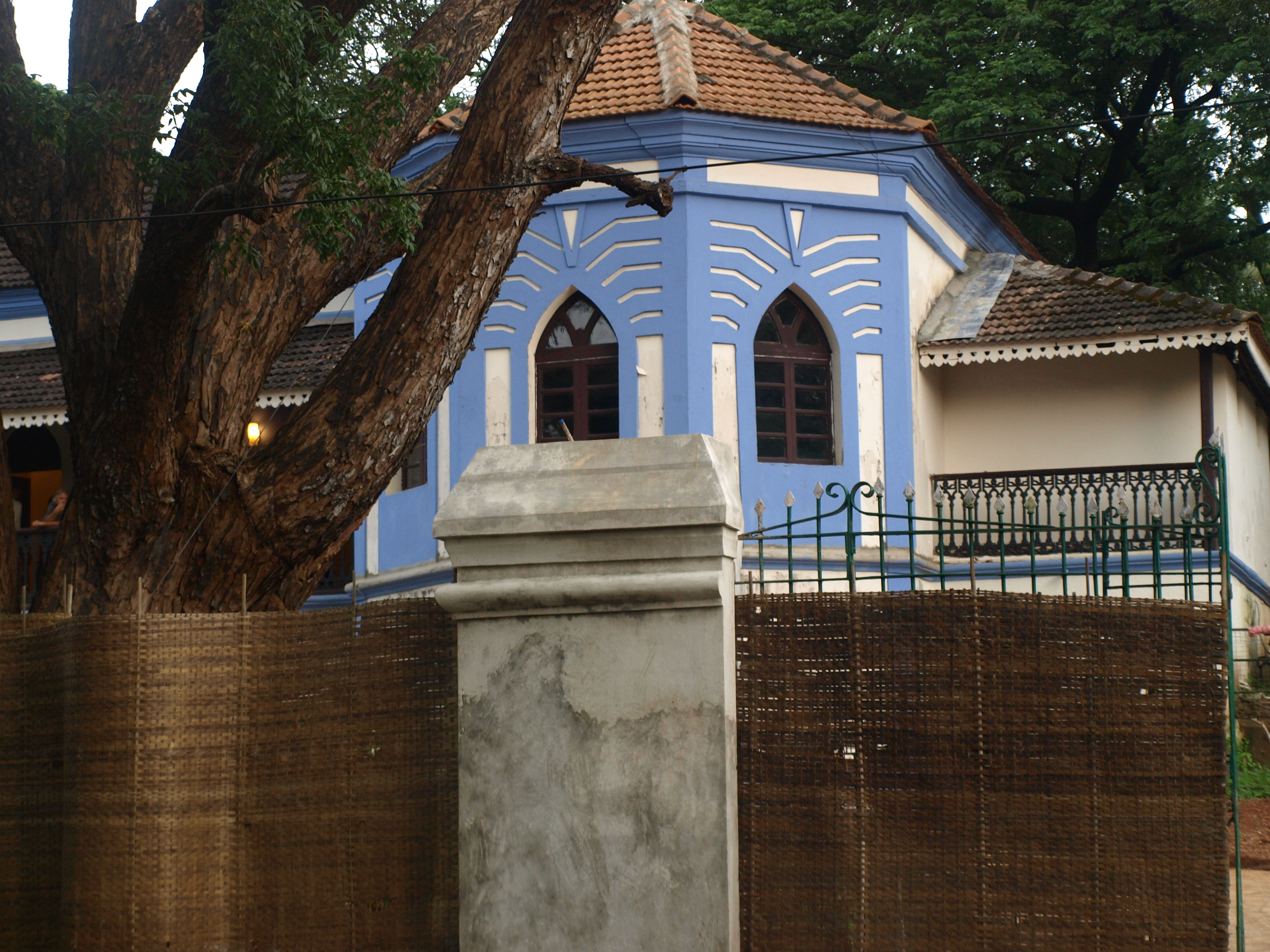

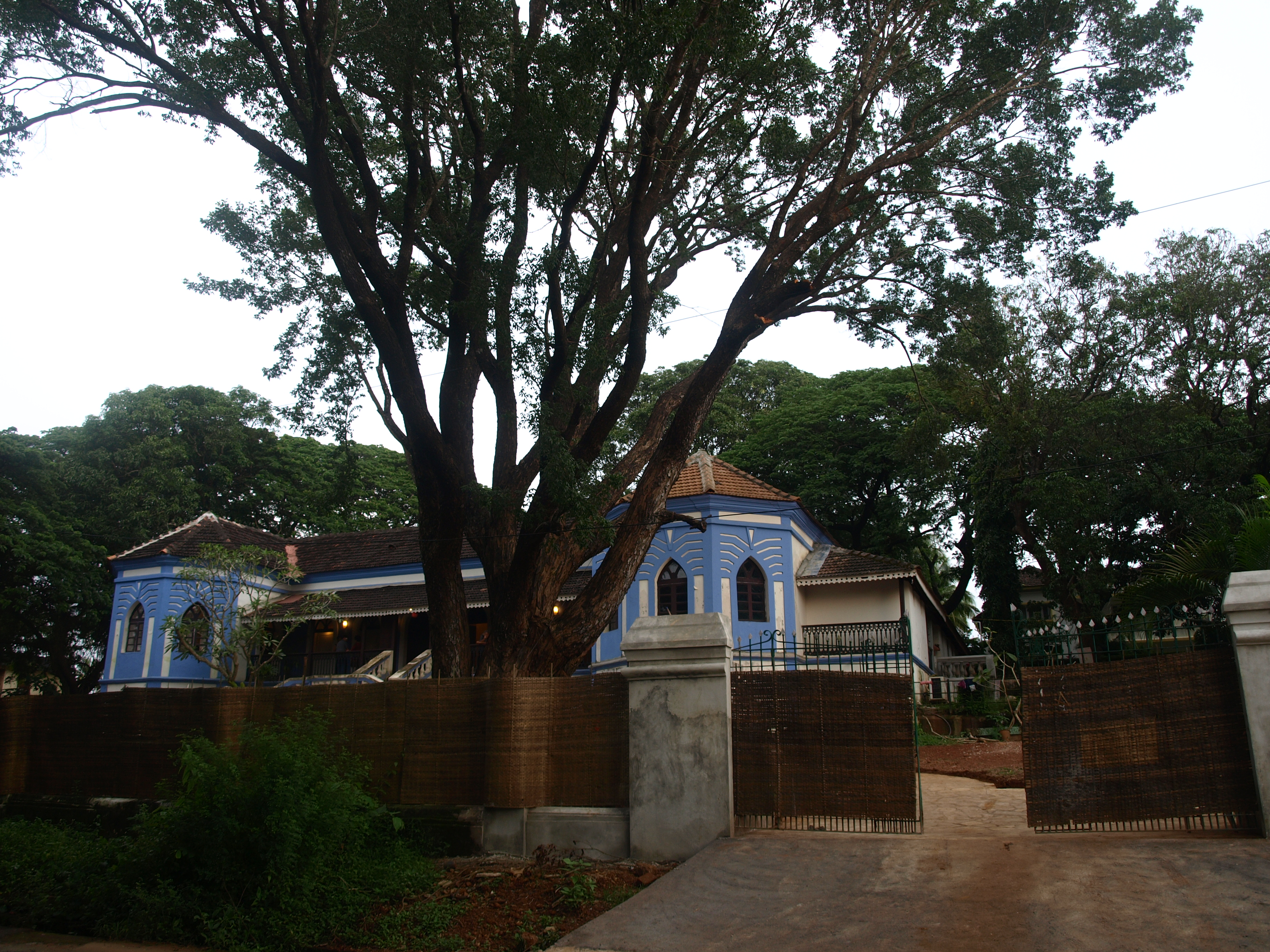
