= Museum of Christian Art =

Christian art museum in Goa, India

Coordinates: 15.501346°N 73.907297°E

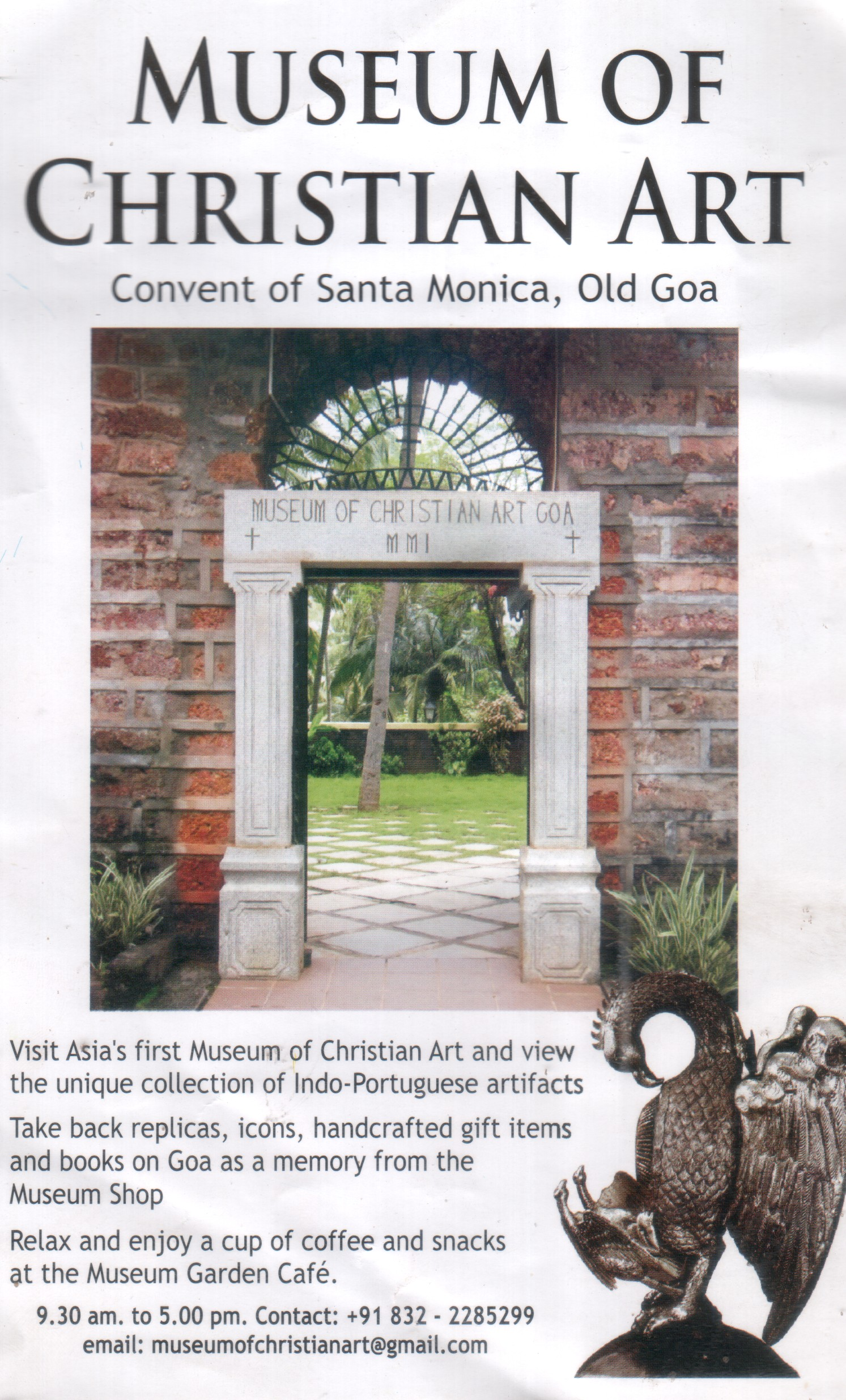
Official poster

The Museum of Christian Art is an Indian museum of Christian art, located in the Convent of Santa Monica in the former colonial capital of Old Goa, Goa.

== History ==
Originally established at the Seminary of Rachol, the museum is a project of the Archdiocese of Goa and was constructed with technical and financial assistance from the Calouste Gulbenkian Foundation, Portugal and the Indian National Trust for Art and Cultural Heritage (INTACH). Initially built for displaying historical works of art, the museum evolved over the years into a space focused on generating awareness of conservation and restoration of art and architecture through various activities and collaborations. Renovation and refurbishment took place from 2017 to 2020, however it continued to remain closed due to the COVID pandemic. The museum reopened on 23 May 2022 after significant upgrades.

=== 2012 robbery ===
In January 2012, assailants killed an overnight security guard and stole an unknown amount of gold materials from the museum.

== See also ==
- Goa State Museum, which includes a gallery of Christian art
