= Music of Goa =

Music

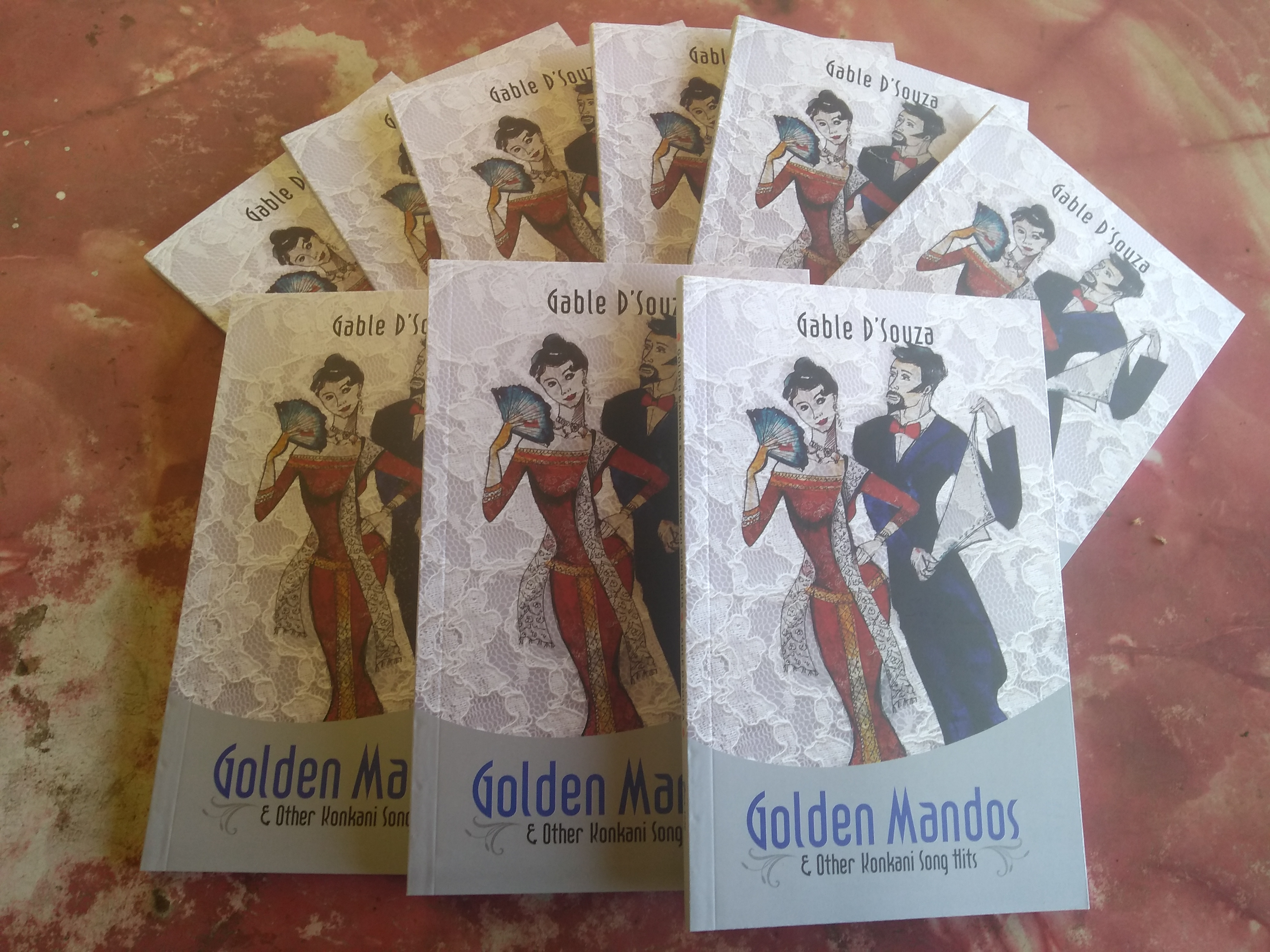
Goan music is a fusion of East and West.

Music of Goa refers to music from the state of Goa, on the west coast of India. A wide variety of music genres are used in Goa ranging from Western art music to Indian classical music. Konkani music is also popular across this tiny state. Being a former territory of Portugal, Goa has a dominant western musical scene with the use of instrument such as the violin, drums, guitar, trumpet and piano. It has also produced a number of prominent musicians and singers for the world of Indian music. Portuguese Fado also has significance in Goa.

Lorna Cordeiro is a popular singer and is referred to as the "nightingale of Goa", singing in both English and Konkani. Other popular performers include Anthony Gonsalves (violinist), António Fortunato de Figueiredo (conductor and violinist), Chris Perry (often called the king of Goan music), Hema Sardesai (playback singer), Ian D'Sa, (former guitarist of Canadian band Billy Talent, of Goan descent), Remo Fernandes (musician and playback singer), Surashree Kesarbai Kerkar (the greatest classical vocalist), Kishori Amonkar (classical vocalist) and Dinanath Mangeshkar (dramatist and classical vocalist). Goa has produced many performers of Indian classical music, such as the vocalist Kesarbai Kerkar, Lata Mangeshkar and Asha Bhosle.

Goan local bands are known for their use of western music styles and are popular at both public and private celebrations. Goa has also developed its own style of trance music. Electronic music festivals are hosted yearly in Goa that attract people from over 50 countries.

== Indigenous traditional music ==
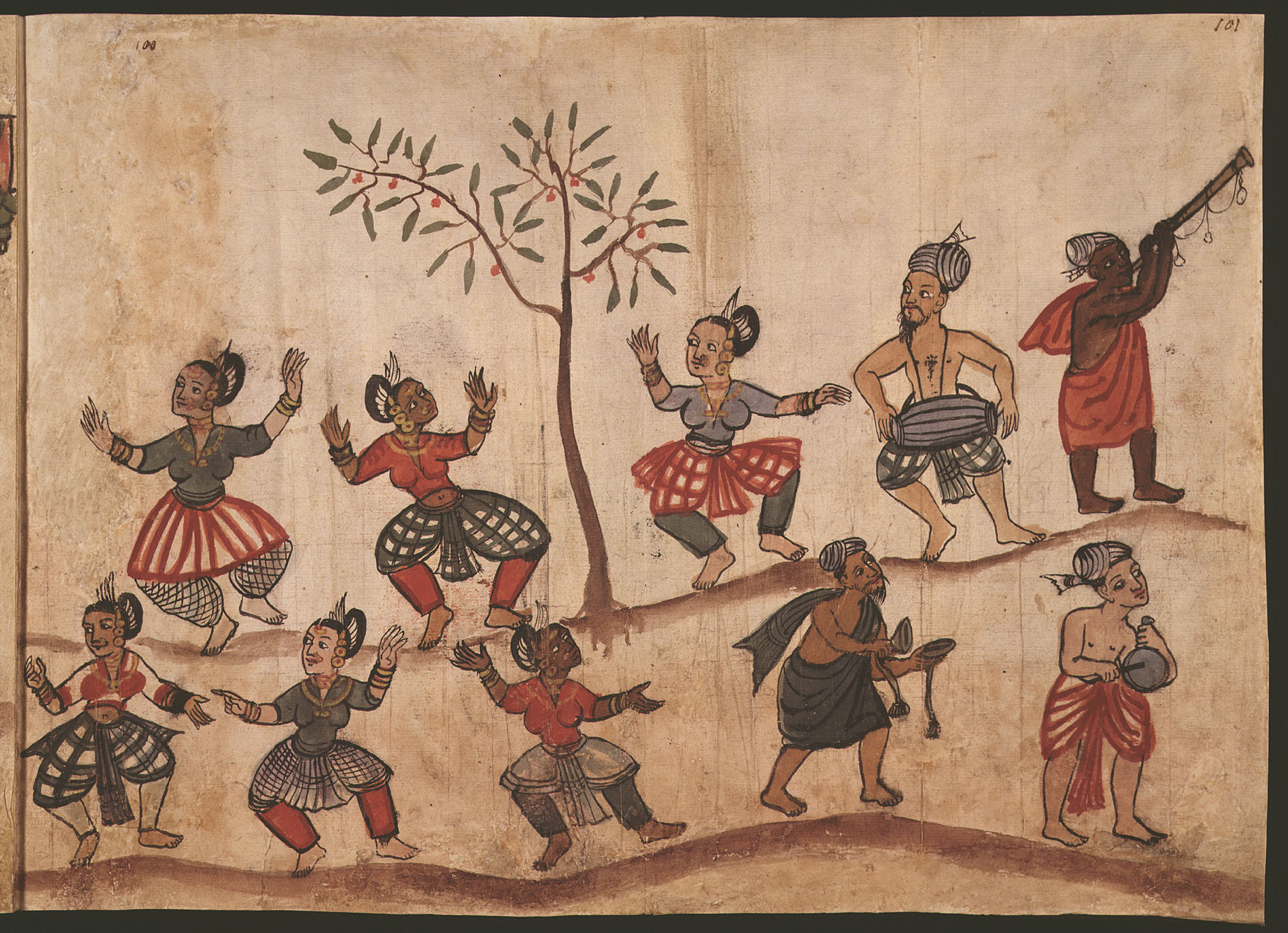
Musicians and dancers at a Hindu wedding ceremony, from the Códice Casanatense (c. 1540)

The traditional Goan musical instruments include dhol, mridanga, tabla, ghumat, dholak, kansallem, mhadalem, shehnai, surt, tasso, nagado, chowgudo, and tambura. The ghumat is an earthen-ware pot-like vessel made by Goan potters with openings on the two opposite sides, one large and the other small in diameter, with the middle portion much bulging outwards. On the larger opening with the edge conveniently moulded for the fitting, a wet skin of a lizard (lacerta ocelata), known in Konkani as sap or gar, is fully stretched to cover the whole surface of the opening. The ghumat is essential for Hindu festivals, some temple rituals like Suvari vadan, bhivari and mando performances. A mhadalem is a cylindrical earthen vessel covered at both ends with the skin of a lizard and is mostly played by the Kunbis. The chowgudo consists of two ‘dhobe’ and ‘zil’ placed in a cross form, facing each other, and played with sticks held in both hands.

Surpavo and konpavo are flutes of the dhangar community of Goa. The surpavo is a long bamboo flute of the shepherds. The instrument is like a staff and is around 60–70 cm long. Its sound is described as being 'soft and sweet'. The konpavo is 20–30 cm long. Its tone is described as being 'bright and high-pitched'. It is played in the upright position and is made of bamboo with a reed. This instrument is said to calm aggressive or disturbed cattle.

Surt (Konkani: सूर्त) is a long wooden tube fixed with a funnel shaped bell with three holes. It is used to accompany the shehnai. Shing is a heavy curved brass trumpet with a shrill, hoarse tone. Korno (Konkani: कोरनो) is a wooden straight trumpet with a funnel-shaped bell. Banko is a curved brass pipe instrument with four pipes fitted in one another. It has a harsh and loud sound.

Being part of Portugal for over 450 years led to the introduction of the piano, mandolin and violin to Goa. Other instruments such as the drums, guitar and trumpet were also widely used. Schools in this period taught pupils at least one such instrument. It is said that Goans have music in their blood, a statement further strengthened by the role music and dance plays in Goan culture. Popular folk dances such as the Portuguese Corridinho are still part of Catholic weddings.

Konkani song may be classified in four groups: one which draws on the more pristine form in music and verse, as in the fugdi or the dhalo; the second which blends western and native music but retains Konkani lyrics as in deknnis; the third which blends native and western music as well as language as in dulpod; and the fourth which has a marked influence of western music and lyrics (in Konkani) with borrowed Portuguese words as in mando.

As many as 35 types of Konkani Song have been classified. These include banvarh, deknni, dhalo, dulpod, duvalo, fell song, fughri, kunnbi song, launimm, mando, ovi, palnnam, talghari, tiatr song, zagor song and zoti. The Christian hymns and Hindu religious songs are also characterized separately with the former related to contemporary western styles.

- Banvarh is a mourning song, usually sung on the day of cremation by Hindus.
- Deknni is a song which originated in Bardez, Ilhas and Salcete.
- Dhalo is a wedding song.
- Dulpod is a dance song with quick rhythm and themes from everyday Goan life.
- Duvallo is a pregnancy song.
- Fell is folk drama with themes from Indian epics or Indian history. It is performed by wandering artists usually after the rains, which start in June and end in August or September. The fell song is a dance song.
- Fughri is a dance song performed on religious occasions, particularly in honour of the deity Ganesha.
- The Kunnbi, who are probably together with the Gaudde the oldest inhabitants of Goa, belong to the peasant strata. The kunnbi song is a dance song in the fughri style depicting their own life, but also protesting against exploitation and social discrimination in a subtle manner.
- Launim is a song dealing with religious and legendary themes.
- Mando is a dance song whose major theme is love, the minor ones being historical narratives, grievance against exploitation and social injustice, and political resistance during the Portuguese presence in Goa.
- Ovi, which the Portuguese termed as versos, is a song with nuptial themes. It has the Sanskrit root vri which means “to choose, to select”. The ovi has three rhymed lines and one unrhymed. The former contain each three or four words and the fourth line one, two, and exceptionally three words. The number of syllables is nine for the rhymed lines and four or five for the last line. The early Portuguese Christian missionaries adopted the ovi-form for liturgical and devotional hymns.
- Palnnam is a cradle song, a lullaby.
- Talgarhi is a song of the Gaudde. The theatre song is sung during the stage play, mainly performed by wandering artists during the dry season. They entertain the public while touching on daily life, but also sing subtle satires on local politics and the shortcomings of Goans.
- Zagor means “watch”. The zagor song is sung in kunnbi folk plays depicting their own life. They are usually staged at night.
- Zoti is sung at nuptials.

The Christian hymns and Hindu songs for the liturgy and popular devotions form an essential part of Goan daily life. It is common for passersby to hear people playing instruments in their houses during the evening hours.

== Western traditional music ==
Local musician performing at Martins Corner in Betalbatim

Portuguese music and dance on cruise, Mandovi River in Panjim

Goa, a part of India since 1961, had been part of Portugal for over 450 years and hence has closer connections with Western classical and popular music. Use of Portuguese music and other western music is popular specifically at most Catholic weddings and celebrations. Live bands are a celebratory feature at such weddings, sometimes substituted by a Disc Jockey instead.

Over the centuries, indigenous Goan music was blended with European music, particularly that of Portugal. Hence Goan music uses western styles, notes and musical instruments more significantly than regional Asian variants. The Goa Symphony Orchestra was founded by António Fortunato de Figueiredo in 1952 and the Goa Philharmonic Choir was founded by Lourdino Barreto.

The Monte Music Festival hosted by Lisbon-headquartered Fundação Oriente, in partnership with the hotel Cidade de Goa is one of the premier cultural events on Goa’s crowded calendar. Every year, the three-day concert features both Indian and Western classical music along with dance performances held at the spectacularly situated Capela do Monte, high above the old capital of the Estado da India (former Portuguese state). The area is a UNESCO world heritage site.

The recently introduced annual two-day Ketevan World Sacred music festival offers music programs, courses and conferences with artists from several traditions around the world including Carnatic, Christian, Sufi, Hindustani, Jewish, Orthodox and many others. Artists like Santiango Girelli (orchestra conductor from Argentina), Rocio De Frutos (soprano from Spain) and Leo Rossi (violinist from Argentina) have participated in past events.

== Tiatr ==
Another major attraction of the Goan music industry is the Tiatr derived from the Portuguese word 'teatro' meaning theater. It is a type of musical theatre still very popular with Goans, resident in Goa or Bombay as well as with expatriates and resident communities in the Middle East, London and other major western cities (where Konkani speakers have a considerable presence). The dramas are performed in the Roman Konkani dialects and include music, dancing and singing. Tiatr performers are called tiatrists. Songs integral to the plays are known as 'Kants'. Other songs, called kantaram are generally either comedic or based on topical, political and controversial issues that are interspersed through the performance. These musical interludes are independent of the main theme of the play. The songs are often satirical and unsparing of the politics and politicians of Goa. The music is provided by a live band including keyboard, trumpet, saxophone, bass guitar and drums. This century old theater industry in Goa still remains independent of government control and efforts to bring it under such control have met massive opposition from locals for fear of government regulation over content of political nature.

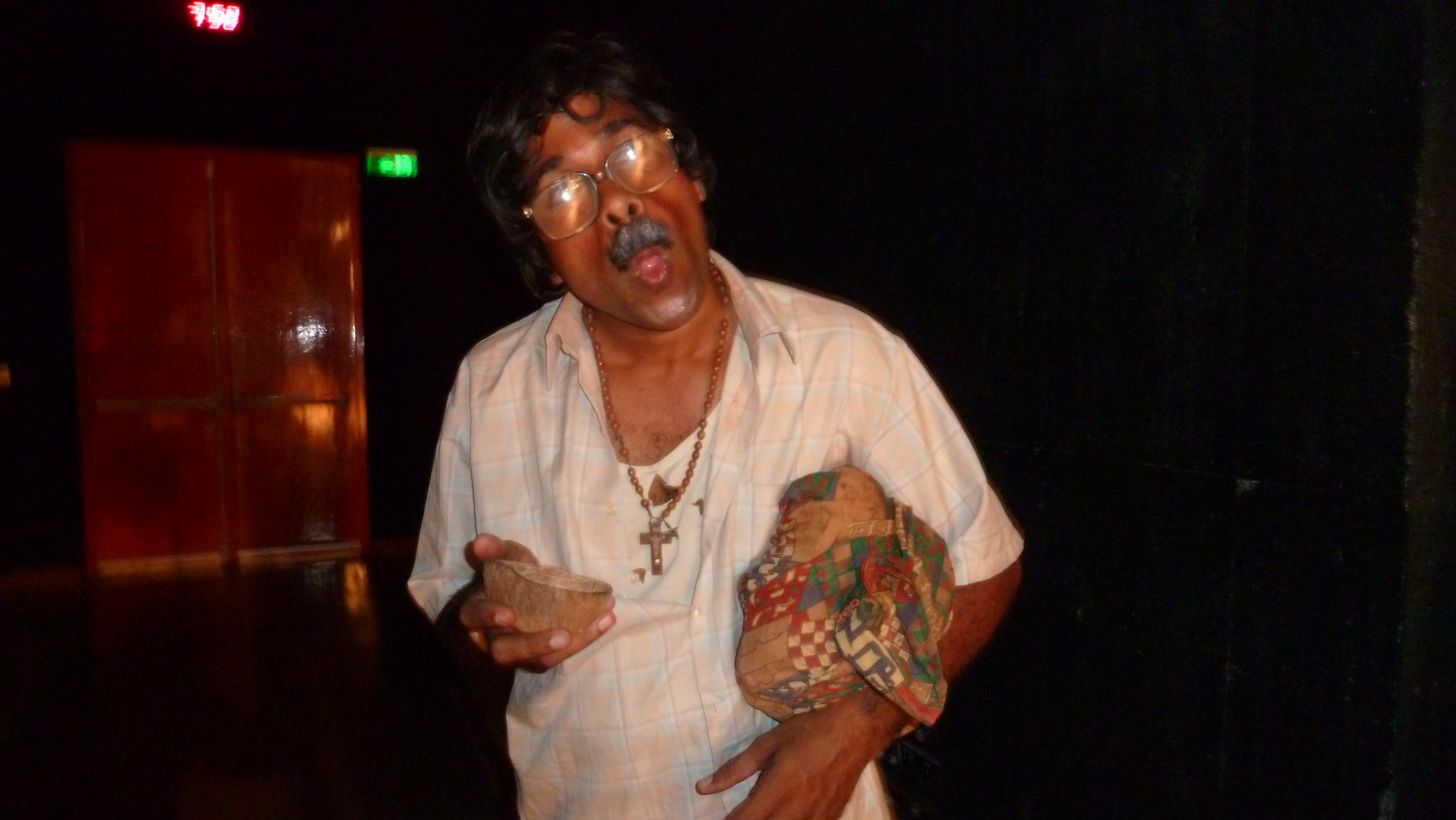
A comic scene from a tiatr.

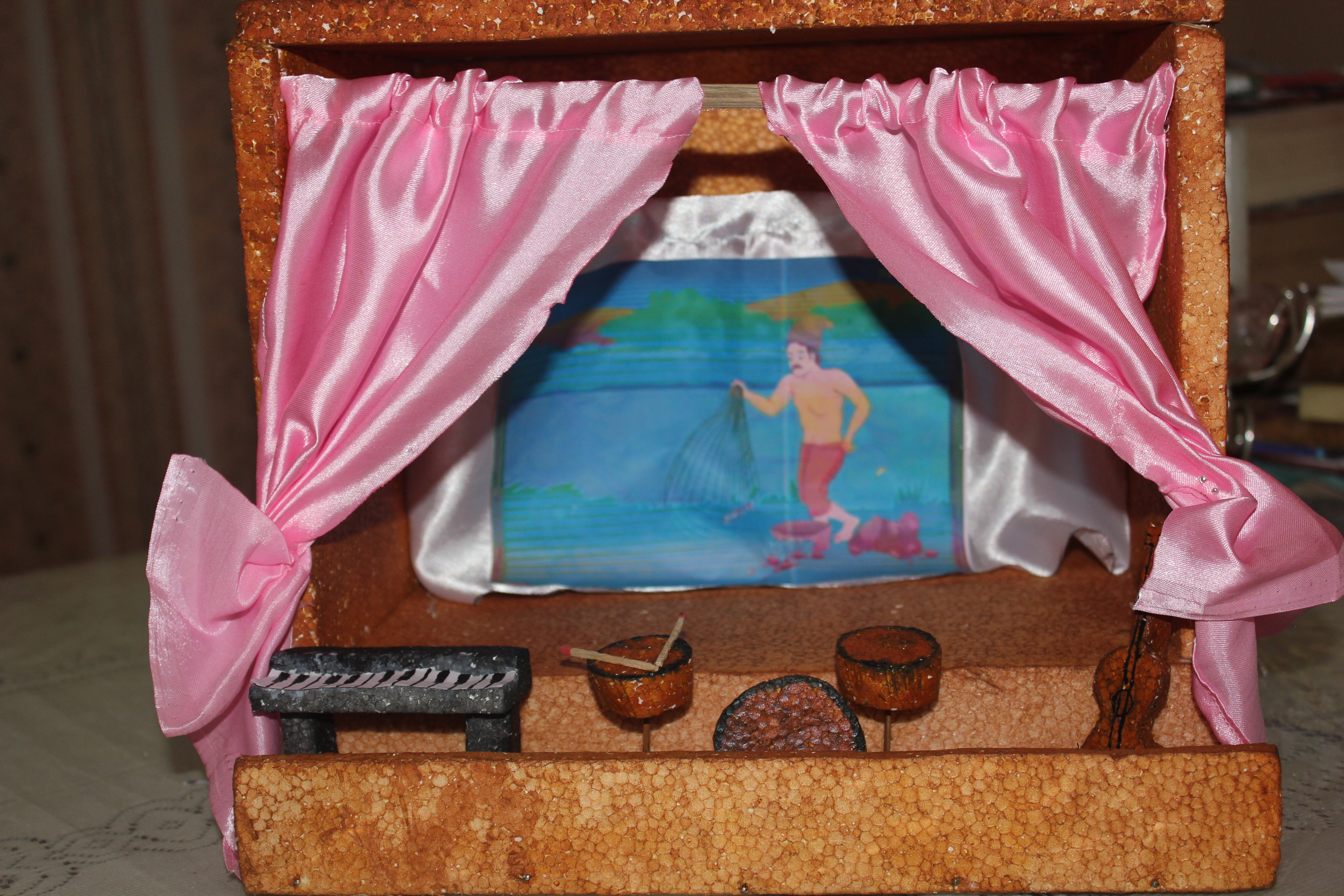
Mobile Props that can be used on stage for various scenes.

== Konkani liturgical music and choirs ==
Goa has a rich heritage of Konkani liturgical music and hymns. The standard hymnal of the Archdiocese of Goa and Daman is called Gaionancho Jhelo (Garland of hymns) and the diocese also brings out a periodical sheet music publication of Konkani liturgical hymns a called Devacheam Bhurgeanchim Gitam (Songs of God's children). As with the liturgy, the entire music of the Catholic church in Goa is in the Latin script.

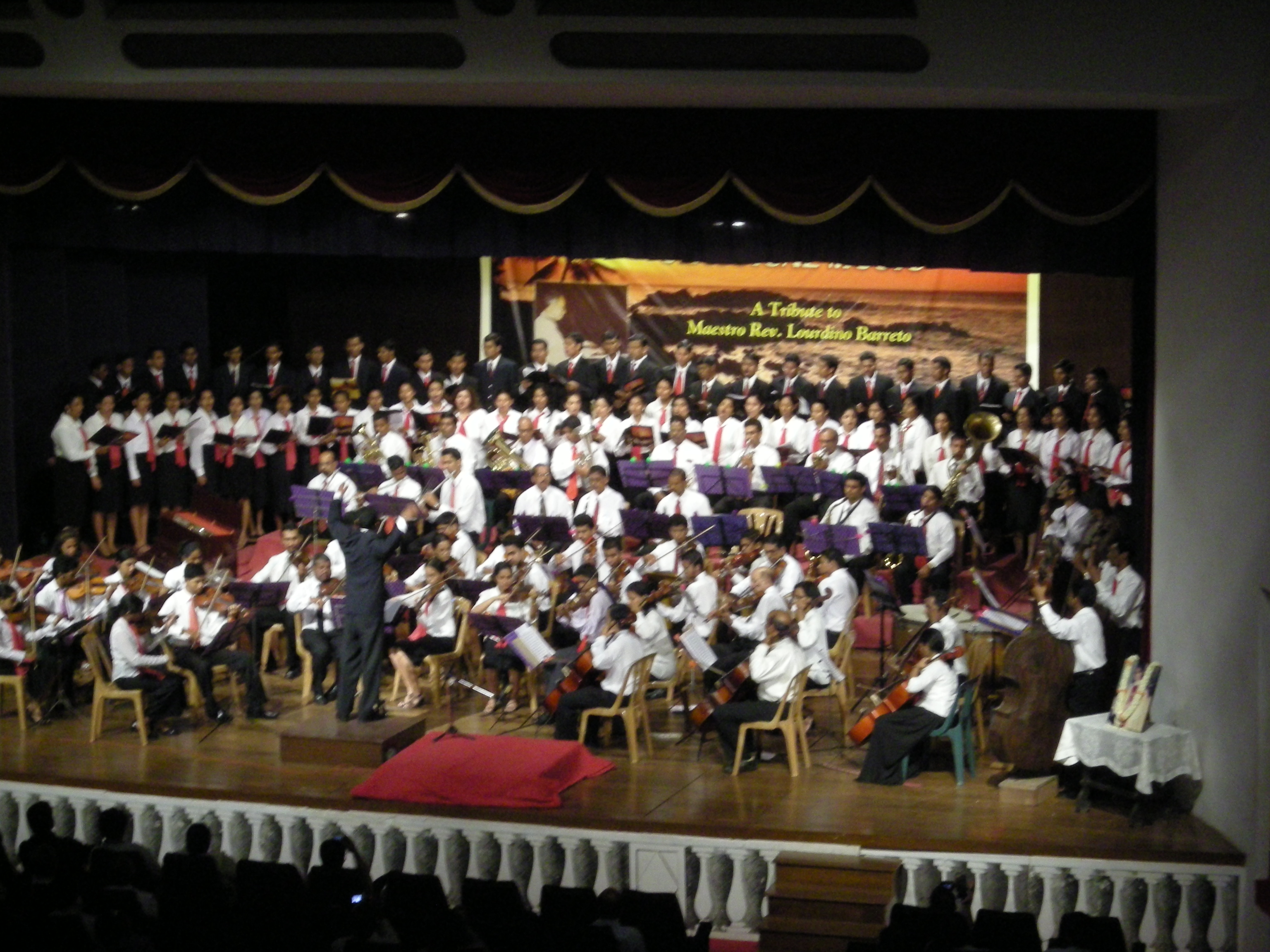
Concert of Classical Music in tribute to Maestro Lourdino Barretto, presented by the Santa Cecilia Choir, conducted by Rev. Romeo Monteiro, at Goa (April 2008).

Churches across Goa always maintain choirs. Like most Catholic churches worldwide, there are separate choirs for adults and children. Some historically significant seminaries also maintain choirs of their own. A notable one is the all-male seminarians of the Santa Cecilia Choir (Coro di Santa Cecilia), part of the over 400 year old Rachol seminary (Seminário de Rachol) of Goa. The choir has also been known to use a 16th-century restored pipe organ for its concerts. Most of the centuries-old churches in Goa feature these pipe organs, but few are known to use them now because of their upkeep. However, they still form part of the churches interior decor and in almost all instances are located in the nave above the main entrances facing the altar in the far end below.

== Pop ==
In the area of Western music, there are several pop stars, among them Remo Fernandes (born 1953). Goan popular music is generally sung in the Konkani language and English language. Another contributor to Goan music is the Canadian-Goan band Goa Amigos, which has represented Goa at the largest South Asian festival in North America.

== Electronic music ==
Goa has become a home for electronic music, especially a style called Goa trance. This genre began its evolution in the late 1960s, when hippies from the United States, United Kingdom and elsewhere turned Goa into a tourist destination. When tourism began to die out, a number of devotees stayed in the area, pursuing a specific style of trance music. Early pioneers included Mark Allen, Goa Gil and Fred Disko.

=== Goa trance ===
Goa Trance (sometimes referred to as Goa or by the number 604) is a form of electronic music that developed around the same time as Trance music became popular in Europe. It originated during the late 1980s and early 1990s in the Indian state of Goa. Essentially, Trance music was pop culture's answer to the Goa Trance music scene on the beaches of Goa where the traveler's music scene has been famous since the time of the Beatles. Goa Trance enjoyed the greater part of its success from around 1994–1998, and since then has dwindled significantly both in production and consumption, being replaced by its successor, Psychedelic Trance (also known as psytrance). Many of the original Goa Trance artists: Hallucinogen, Slinky Wizard, and Total Eclipse are still making music, but refer to their style of music simply as "PSY". TIP Records, Flying Rhino Records, Dragonfly Records, Transient Records, Phantasm Records, Symbiosis Records, Blue Room Released were all key players on the beach and in the scene.

Goa Trance is closely related to the emergence of Psytrance during the latter half of the 1990s and early 2000s, where the two genres mixed together. In popular culture, the distinction between the two genres often remains largely a matter of opinion (they are considered by some to be synonymous; others say that Psytrance is more "psychedelic/cybernetic" and that Goa Trance is more "organic", and still others maintain that there is a clear difference between the two). If anything, the styles are easier to differentiate in Central and Eastern Europe (e.g. Austria, Hungary, Romania) where Goa Trance parties are more popular than Psy-Trance parties - the opposite being true in the UK, Belgium and Germany. Psy Trance has a noticeably more aggressive bass line and Goa tends to avoid the triplet-style bass lines. Between them however, both psy- and Goa trance are sonically distinct from other forms of trance in both tonal quality, structure and feel. In many countries they are generally more underground and less commercial than other forms of trance, except for Brazil and Israel, which since the year of 2000 it became both countries' most popular type of music for the general party scene. Top DJs from the UK and other parts of Western Europe fly to Goa for special parties, often on the beaches or in rice paddies. "Shorebar" at Anjuna Beach in Northern Goa is traditionally seen as the birthplace and center of the Goa trance scene.

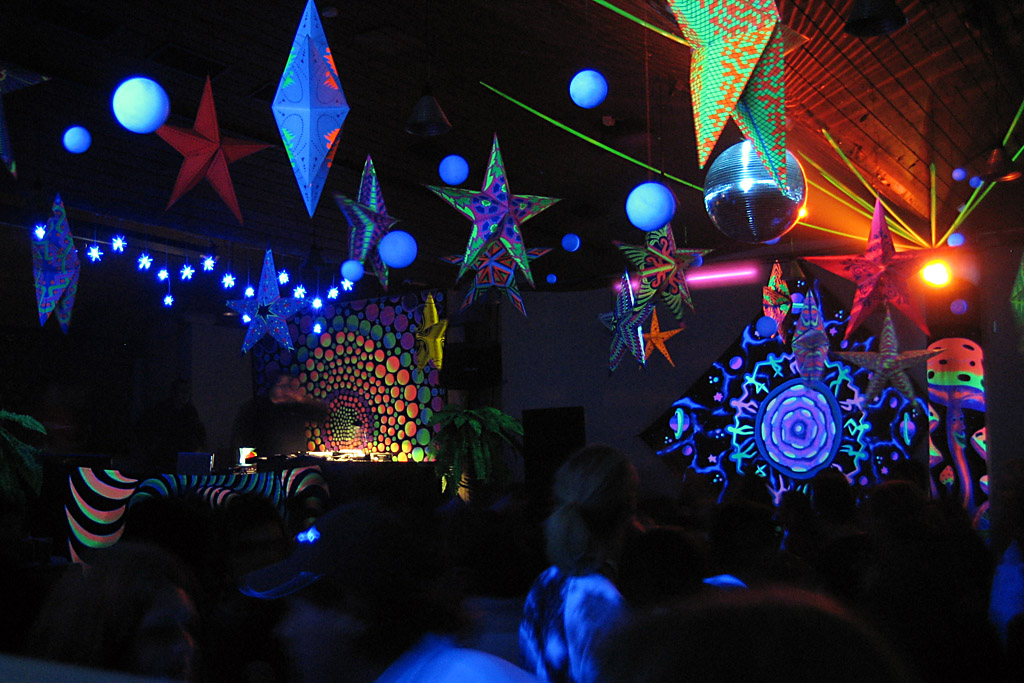
Decor for music settings in Goa.

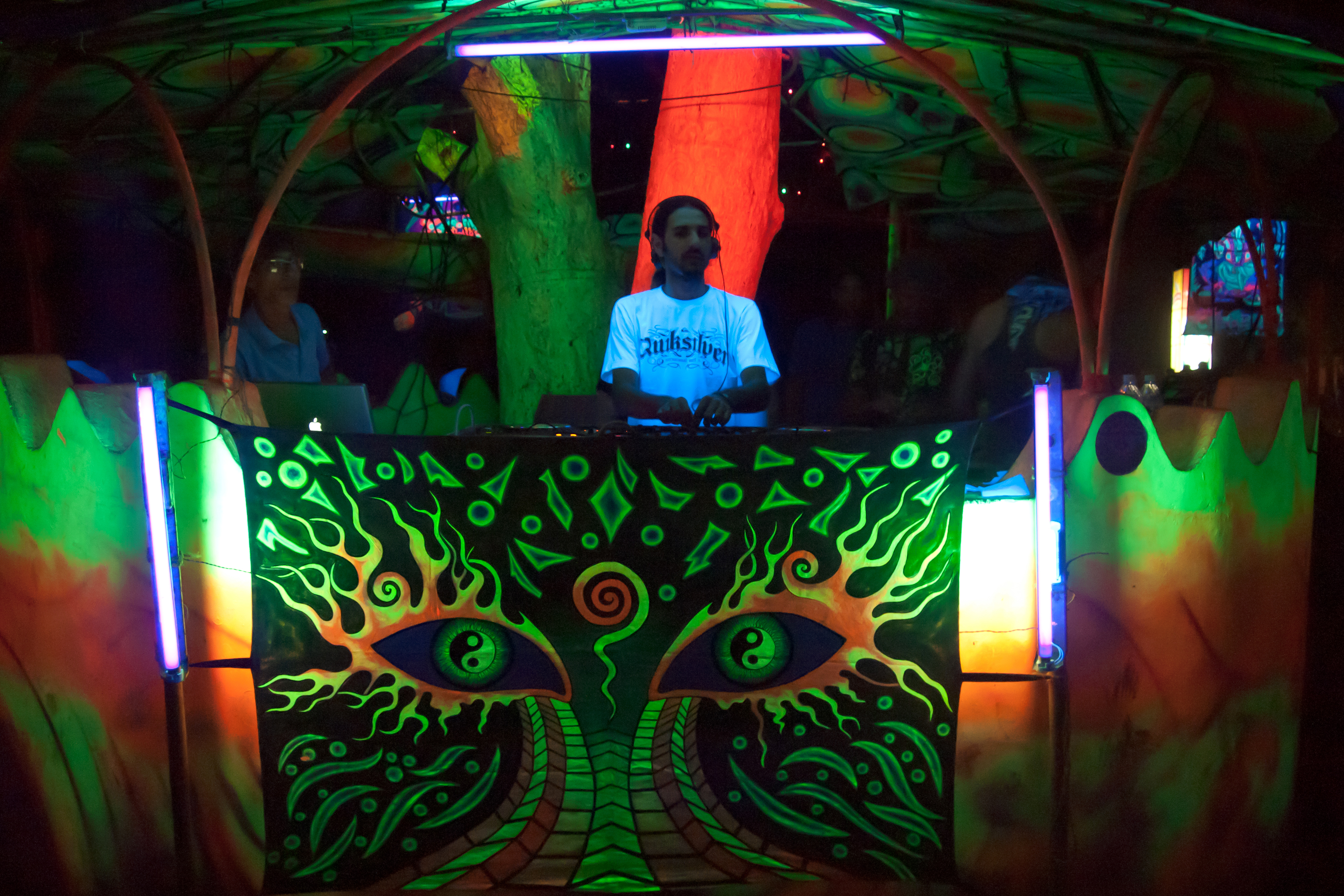
Trance party in Goa.

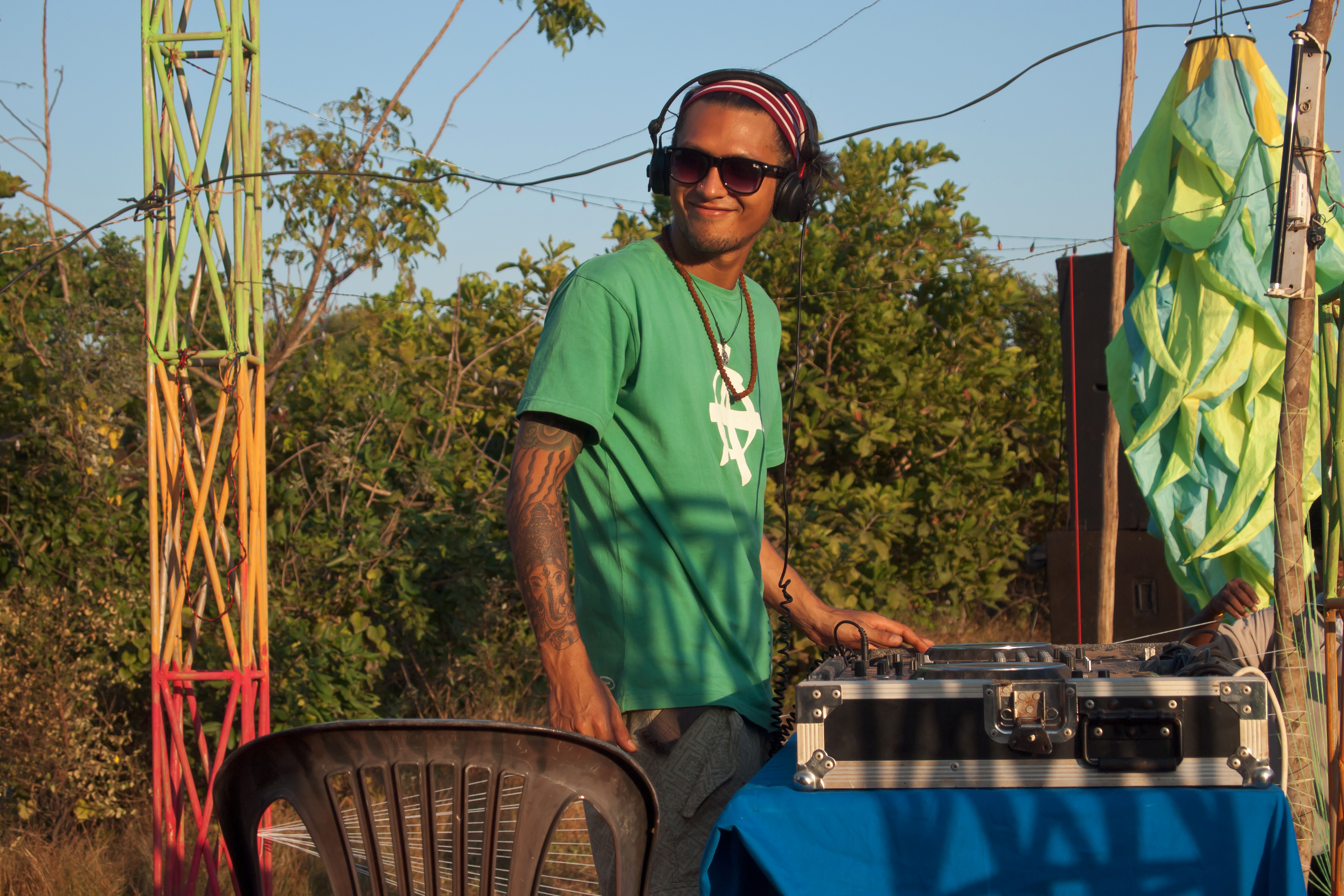
DJ playing music.

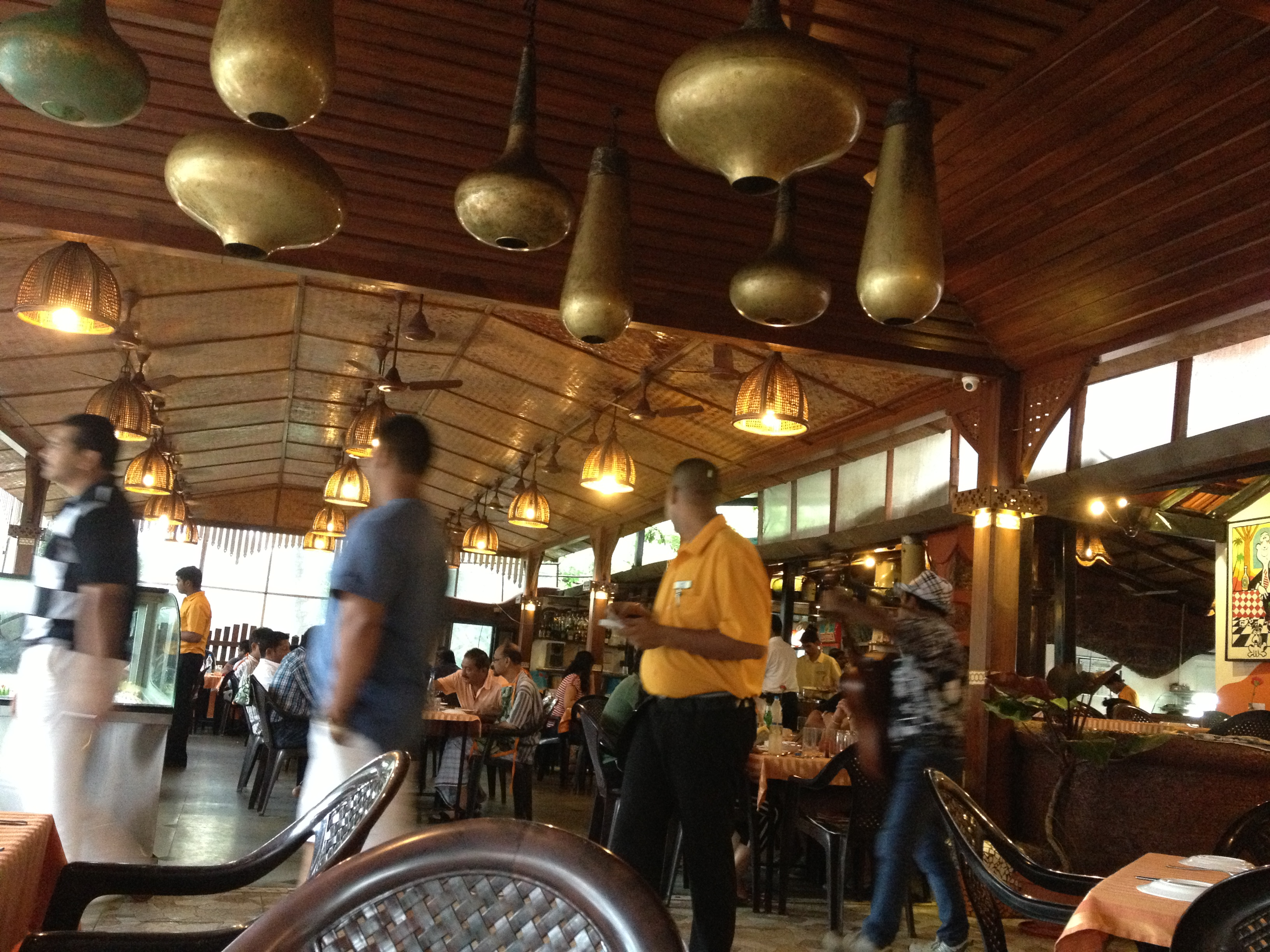
Live bands involving Karaoke are a regular feature at popular restaurants such as this one at Martin's corner (Goa).

== See also ==
- Baila music - Style of Sri Lankan songs similar to Portuguese style Goa songs.
- Amancio D'Silva - Goan Guitarist who brought Carnatic styling to Jazz in the west in the late 1960s.
