= Old Goan Gold =

Studio album by Remo Fernandes
- Released: 1985
- Recorded: Siolim, Goa
- Length: 59:48
- Language: Konkani, Portuguese
- Label: Goana Records

Old Goan Gold is a music album by Remo Fernandes and released in 1985. It consists of songs in Konkani and Portuguese. Alisha Chinai has also performed in the album.

The album, which was released on Remo's own record label, Goana Records, contains songs which Remo had grown up listening to on the radio and in his father's record collection; nostalgic songs which he could not find in record shops anymore. It was initially released on audio cassettes, with side A in Konkani, and side B in Portuguese.

The album comprises traditional songs together with four originals, three in Konkani, and one in Portuguese. The original songs are: : the mando Panch Vorsam (sung by Alisha & Remo and composed by Remo for Shyam Benegal's film Trikaal), Soiri, Konkani (a theme song for the Konkani movement of 1985), and Fado Goa. Soiri was originally a poem written by Dr. Manohar Rai Sardesai, set to music by Remo.

Old Goan Gold was recorded during the monsoons and released during the Christmas season of 1985. It was the first Goan album to be released in Japan, by Meta Records, Tokyo. Remo recorded the songs on a four-track cassette Portastudio recorder in his home. In this album, Remo played all the instruments, sang all voices (except the tracks with Alisha), and was the only composer of its music and lyrics. He engineered the recording and mixing and designed the album covers.

== Track listing ==
The album consists of 15 tracks and runs for 59 min 48 sec.

Konkani

- Dulpods - Goan Traditional
- Panch Vorsam
- Kuxttoba - Goan Traditional
- Soiri
- Rajan & Prema
- Adeus
- Konkani

Portuguese

- Historia Duma Mulher - Brazilian
- Minha Joia - Brazilian
- Saudades Do Sertao - Portuguese
- Coimbra - Portuguese
- Fado Goa - Portuguese
- Papa Maezinha - Brazilian
- Porque Foste Na Vida - Brazilian
- Guitarrada - Portuguese Traditional
