= São João Festival in Goa =

Catholic festival in Goa, India

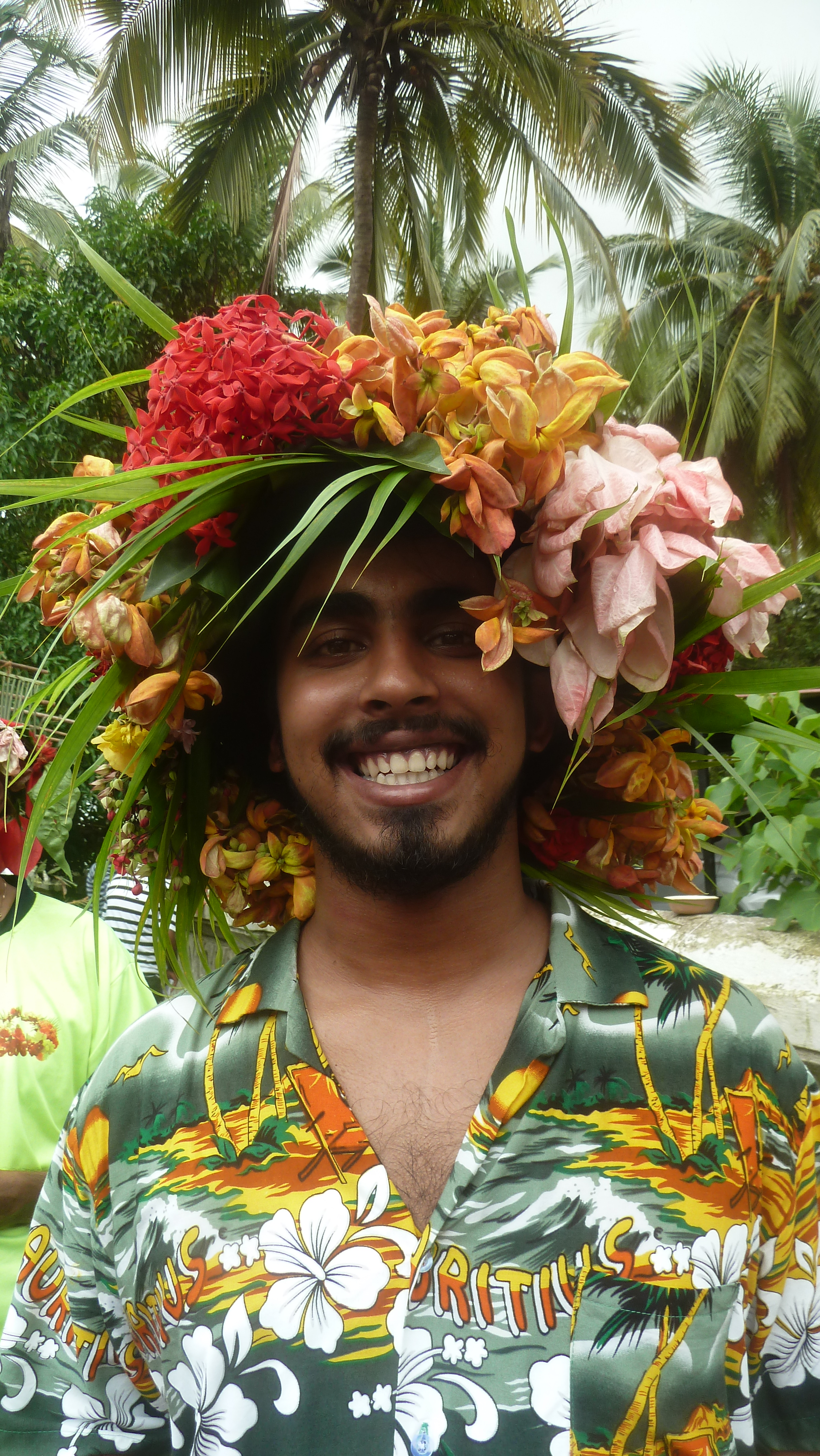
A Catholic man wearing a Kopel (floral wreath) during the São João festival in Goa

San Juanv or São João is an annual Catholic religious festival celebrated on 24 June in Goa, India. According to tradition, after attending Mass, young Goan Catholics leap into and swim in local wells, streams, and ponds as a tribute to Saint John the Baptist.

== Background ==
The feast of São João is a celebration of the birth anniversary of Saint John the Baptist. Saint John was the son of Saint Elizabeth, a relative of Mary, mother of Jesus. One day, when Mary visited Elizabeth, the baby Saint John 'leapt' in her womb upon hearing Mary's greeting (Luke 1:44) When Jesus was thirty years old, he was baptised by Saint John in the Jordan River.

The Nativity of John the Baptist is known to be one of the oldest festivals of the Christian church, and records show that it was celebrated as a big feast in 506 AD.

The feast of São João in Goa coincides with the time of the year when the monsoon in Goa has usually commenced, there are fresh greenery and flowers in the surroundings, and wells and other water bodies are full. Consequently, the celebration of the birth of Saint John in Goa apparently evolved to incorporate elements of celebration of the rainy season. Jumping in wells and ponds is symbolic of the baby Saint John leaping in the womb, and of the baptism of Jesus in the river Jordan.

== Observance and traditions ==
While the feast of São João is celebrated across the Catholic world on the same day, Goa is the only place in the world where it is marked by leaping into wells. On this day, groups of people go around singing traditional songs accompanied with instruments like ghumot, mhadalem, and kansallem.

People wear kopels (transl. crowns) made of flowers and a creeper known locally as sanjuachi vaal (transl. creeper of São João). The creeper is found growing in wells during the early monsoons. It also has small red flowers that add to the beauty of the kopel. Some believe that the creeper was worn by Saint John himself.

Men also wear other adornments and vestments made from plant and other natural substances probably also a nod to the fact that Saint John wore natural coverings instead of clothing made of fabric.

While the general perception is that the festival is only celebrated by jumping into wells, Catholics also pray on this occasion for a good monsoon. In recent times, the festival has gained popularity among tourists. The festival has also been commercialized, with pool parties and resort celebrations included as part of celebrations.

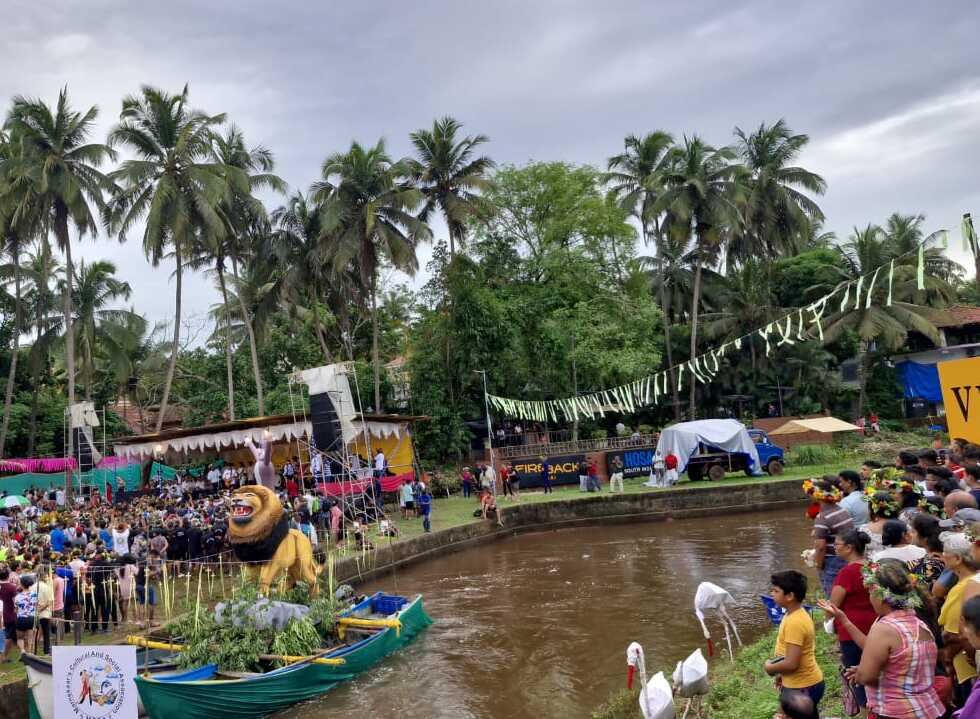
São João boat festival in Siolim in 2024

While the São João celebrations are "centuries old", a more recent tradition is followed in the village of Siolim, in Bardez taluka, featuring colourful floats on boats. These festivities date back 175 years, when São João revellers from Chapora and Zhor villages of Anjuna, Badem in Assagao, and Siolim would come in boats to the chapel of São João in Pereira Vaddo, Siolim, every year, to pay homage to the saint.

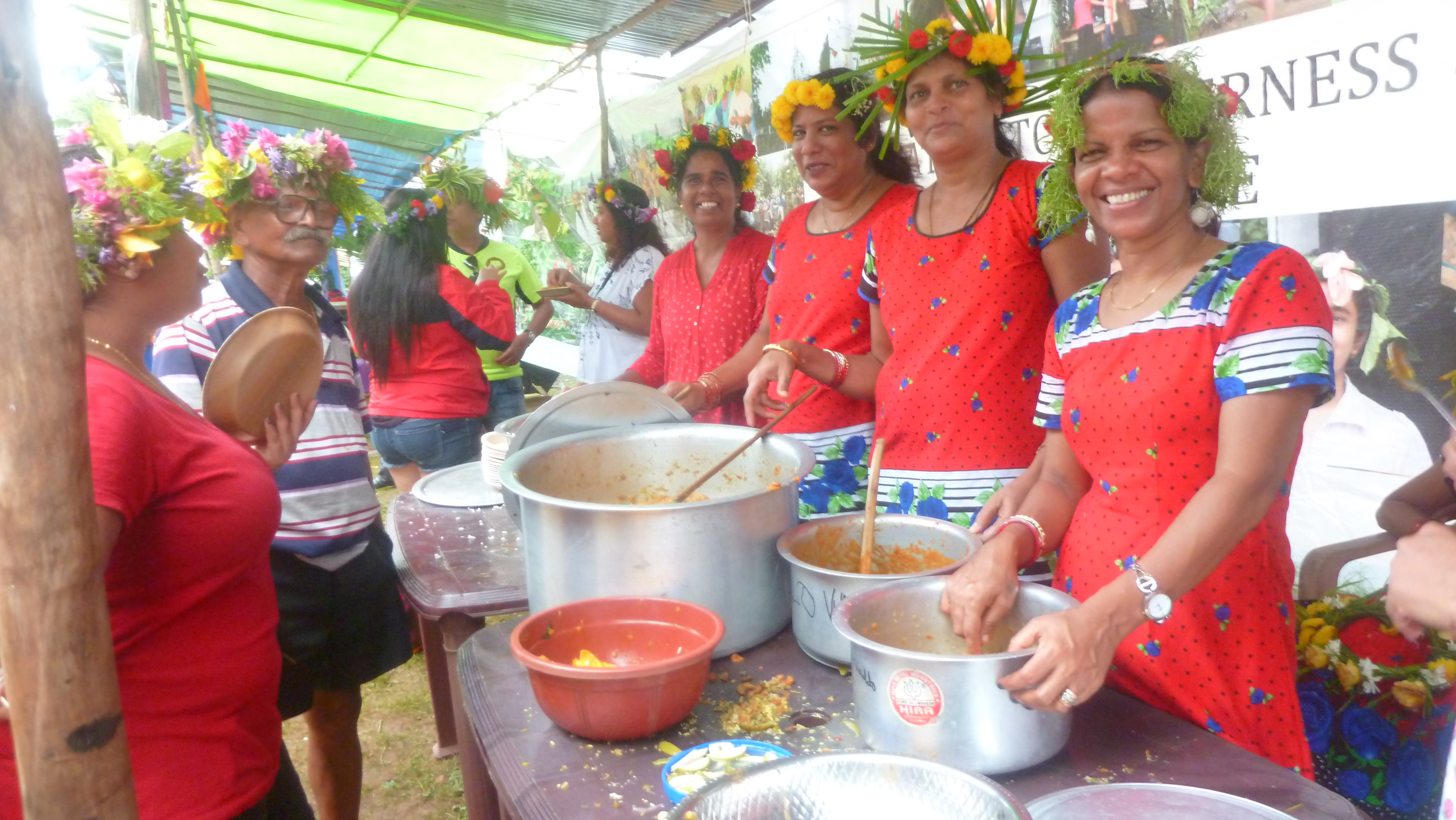
Villagers at Saligao, Goa, serve food to all present during the São João (Vangodd de Saligao) festival in Goa

In the village of Saligao, also in the Bardez taluka, the event is celebrated as the Vangodd de Saligao, a village festival of music, dance and with the villagers often cooking enough food to feed all the visitors free of cost.

São João is also a celebration of thanksgiving for newly-weds, and for families with babies born during the preceding year. It is thus referred to as Zanvoiamchem fest (transl. son-in-law's feast) locally. The newly married son-in-law is invited for lunch by his mother-in-law, following which the son-in-law is warmly welcomed with the bursting of firecrackers. Family members then sing the litany of all saints in Latin, followed by hymns dedicated to honour Saint John the Baptist, the Virgin Mary and other saints. As part of the celebratory lunch, dishes such as sanna (a steamed rice cake fermented with coconut palm toddy), verdur (pumpkin cooked in coconut milk, along with spices and shrimps) and pork vindaloo are prepared. Dessert includes patollyo (a dumpling stuffed with grated coconut and palm jaggery that is wrapped in fresh turmeric leaves). Following the meal, the family welcomes the village youth, who sing songs dedicated to Saint John and announce their arrival by hitting stumps of coconut palm on the ground. Later, in the evening, the son-in-law returns to his home with an ojem (transl. bamboo basket with gifts) gifted to him by his mother-in-law. This ojem is filled with fruits and sweets. Upon reaching his home, he places the ojem at the oratory of his house, following which everyone recites a short prayer and then distributes the contents of the ojem among his fellow villagers. This is meant to signify that a marriage is not just between two families but between two villages.

Traditionally, only male villagers would go around the village singing songs dedicated to Saint John. Announcing their arrival by hitting stumps of coconut palm on the ground, they would visit all the families in the village. They would wear colourful kopels and play traditional musical instruments like the ghumot and kansallem. People would thank them for visiting their houses by offering the boys alcohol, sannas, patollyo and an assortment of fruits. At the end, the boys would assemble at the village cross and pray the litany honouring Saint John. The gifts that were offered by the families were then distributed among all the men. Following this, the men would jump into wells or lakes, despite the practice being discouraged by the Catholic Church.

Another tradition involves creating effigies of Judas or the Devil using dry materials like hay and paper and decorated using dry jackfruit or mango leaves. The effigy is carried by young boys to every house in the village and ultimately burnt to ashes outside the village cross or chapel.

== São João in Mumbai ==
Over the years, the feast in Mumbai has evolved from a neighborhood community festival to a citywide carnival, with events hosted from Marine lines to Manori, open to people within and outside the Catholic fold. Water is central to São João celebrations. In Mumbai and Thane, wells, ponds and tanks stand in for the river, with community members leaping into the wells. If a water body is not available, tankers are summoned and sprinklers are set up.
