= Rajan and Prema =

Rajan and Prema is a traditional Konkani duet. The music and lyrics for this song were written by Antoninho de Souza.

This is a song sung by two lovers, Rajan and Prema. Prema is upset to know that Rajan must travel to Bombay for a job. Rajan convinces Prema that he is committed to her and proposes marriage to her. The song is called Rajan ani Prema in Konkani.

The most well-known version of this song is the one sung by Remo Fernandes and Alisha Chinai for the 1985 album Old Goan Gold.
