= Ghumot =

Percussion instrument from Goa, India

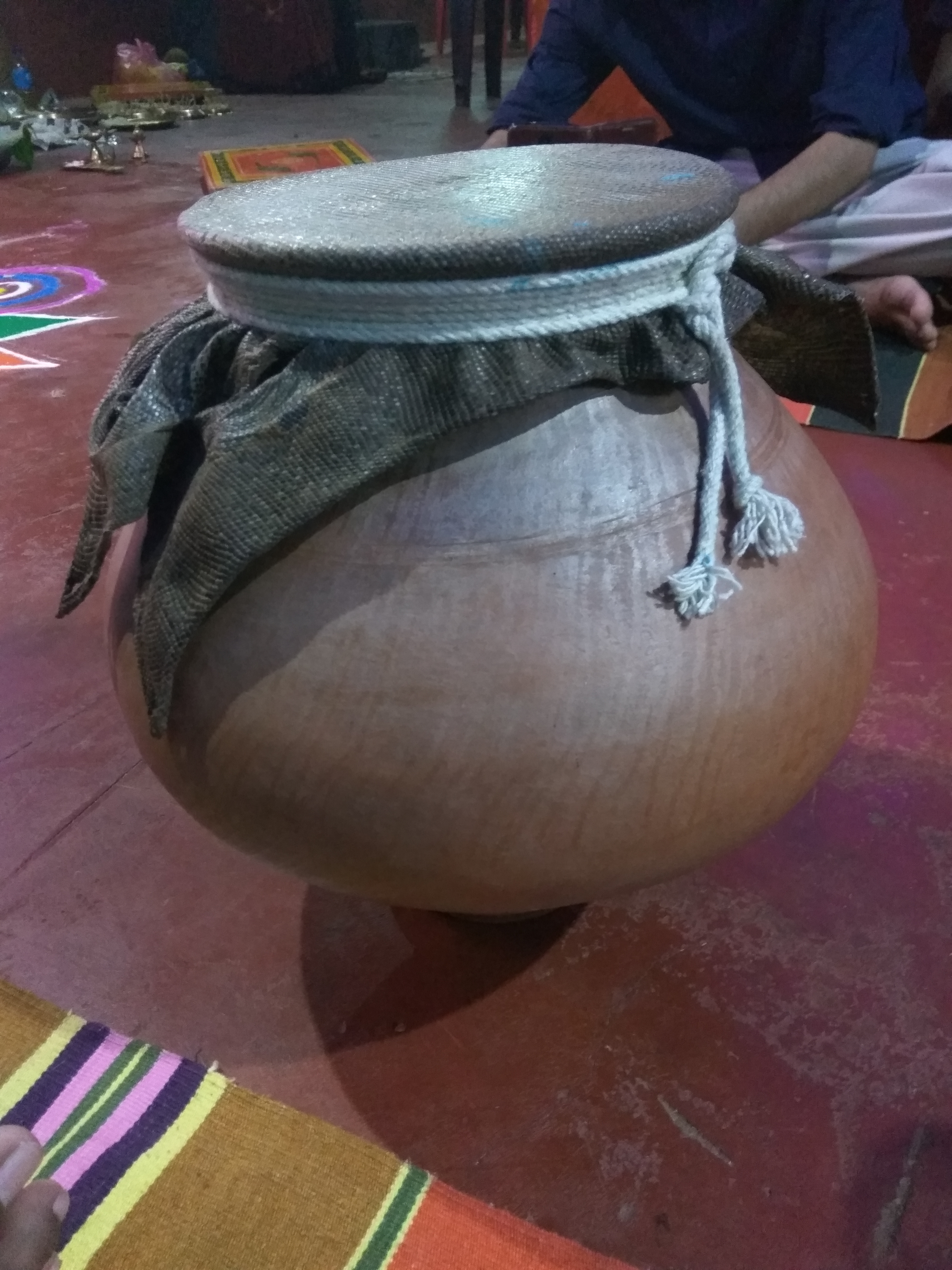
- Ghumot made with monitor lizard skin in Goa

Percussion instrument

The ghumot, gumot or ghumat is a membranophone percussion instrument from Goa, India.

It is made of an earthen vessel with both sides open; the larger opening is traditionally mounted with the leather of a monitor lizard, which acts as the drum membrane.

In August 2019, the Government of Goa declared the ghumot a heritage instrument.

== Etymology ==
The name of the instrument is derived from its distinct architectural form, which closely resembles a rounded earthen water pot (known locally as a ghumpi math or golghumat).

== Origins and history ==
Historical analysis indicates that the instrument was originally developed by local tribal communities. In subsequent periods, classical musicians and performers systematized its usage and provided it with a formal musical framework.

While the instrument is not explicitly mentioned in ancient Sanskrit texts such as Bharata Muni's Natyashastra, Ratnakar, or Parijat, literature notes that similarly shaped musical instruments existed historically across parts of South India.

== Construction ==
The ghumot is primarily an earthen vessel crafted by traditional potters. It features a specialized asymmetric design with two distinct openings.

The primary being a wide mouth situated on the right side, which is covered and sealed with an animal hide membrane.

The secondary opening is a significantly smaller mouth on the opposite side, designed to be easily covered, modulated, or released by the player's palm to regulate internal air pressure and sound resonance.

=== Manufacturing process ===
To secure the membrane onto the clay body, the hide is soaked in water overnight to increase flexibility.

The following day, it is stretched over the larger opening of the pot, bound securely using coir ropes and fibers obtained from banana plants, and subsequently left to dry completely in a shaded area.

=== Material variations ===
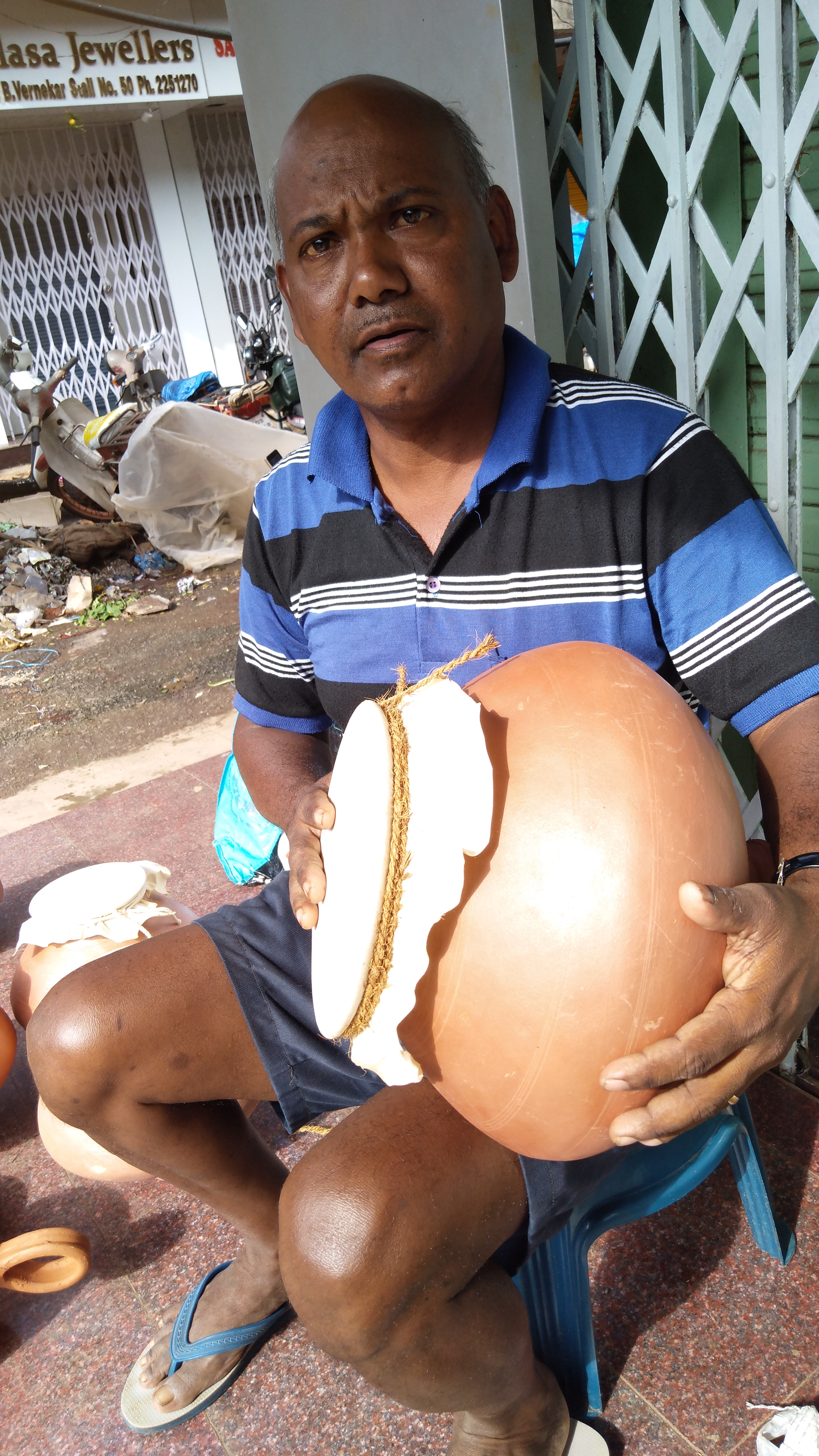
Vendor with a goat-skin replacement for the 'ghumot' at the Mapusa market, in Goa, in 2017.

While the standard instrument is constructed from clay, metallic variations exist. For instance, temples located in the Bicholim (Bhatagram) region utilize unique Ghumats manufactured from copper and brass rather than earthenware.

While the drum membrane is traditionally made from the skin of the endangered monitor lizard, modern variations use goat skin.

== Playing technique and accompaniment ==
The instrument is played using both hands; the musician positions their left hand over the smaller opening to control air release while simultaneously striking the stretched hide on the larger opening with their right hand.

The ghumot is rarely played in isolation and is typically part of an ensemble. It is commonly accompanied by the shamel, a complementary percussion instrument that provides the primary rhythmic beat, or the kansallem, which are a pair of cymbals that provide metallic rhythm.

When played together, this ensemble produces a traditional form of instrumental music known as Suvari vadan.

== Cultural significance ==
=== Hindu community traditions ===
- Birth rituals: The instrument is traditionally played during Satipujan, a ritual celebrated on the sixth day following the birth of a child, a custom notably maintained by families bearing the Chodankar surname.
- Shigmo festival: During the month of Phalgun, the Ghumat is central to the large-scale Shigmo celebrations. On the inaugural day of the festival (referred to as Haldone), an introductory song set to an eight-beat rhythm is performed alongside the instrument.
- Ganesh Chaturthi: During the month of Bhadrapad, the instrument is widely utilized across various social strata, including agrarian communities, to accompany devotional prayers (aarti) during Ganesh Chaturthi.

=== Christian community traditions ===
Within the Christian community of Goa, the Ghumat is regularly integrated into regional folk performance arts, including traditional musical genres like the Mando and Dekhni.

The community also utilizes a related clay percussion instrument called the mhadalem. While the mhadalem features a structural variation where hide membranes are fixed to both openings of the vessel, it is played using the same technical methodology and rhythmic principles as the Ghumat. Performances typically feature four to five distinct types of rhythmic patterns, incorporating specific vocalized beats and tempos such as dhignakata and dhignak.

== Other states ==
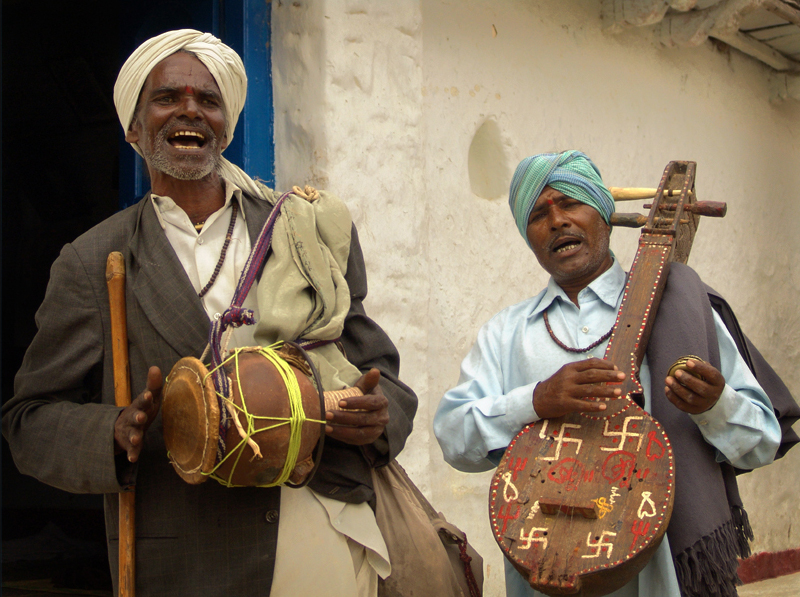
Performers of gummeta and tanpura in Andhra Pradesh

This percussion instrument is also played to accompany folk songs in some areas of Karnataka.

In Andhra Pradesh, this drum is known as gummeta, and it is played in the storytelling folk tradition.
