= Kuxttoba =

19th-century Goan rebel (died 1871)

Kuxttoba was a Goan who rebelled against the Portuguese rule. He was a member of the Salekar branch of the Rane family. Information about his birth, the reason and the course of his rebellion and the manner of his end are vague. He did rebel as an individual against the rule of the Portuguese in Goa but he presented no concept for an independent Goa. Neither did the Ranes do so when they took to arms against the Portuguese Government in Goa, nor the Sipais (Sepoys) when they mutinied. Kuxttoba was shot dead on 13 June 1871. The official version is that Constâncio de Rosário e Miranda of the 4th Division ambushed and killed him. The popular version is that he was betrayed by his mistress Bulem in exchange for a bribe.

There is a deknni of the same name dated around 1869 in which he is called "heir to India and terror of Goa" (Miraxi Indiecho, Terror Goencho). The most common version of this song was recorded by Remo Fernandes in his 1985 album Old Goan Gold.
