= Sowar =

Mounted cavalry soldier in South Asia

- سوار
- Country: Delhi Sultanate; Deccan Sultanates; Mughal Empire; Maratha Empire; British Raj; India; Pakistan
- Branch: Cavalry
- Equipment: Composite bow, Talwar, Spear, and Musket

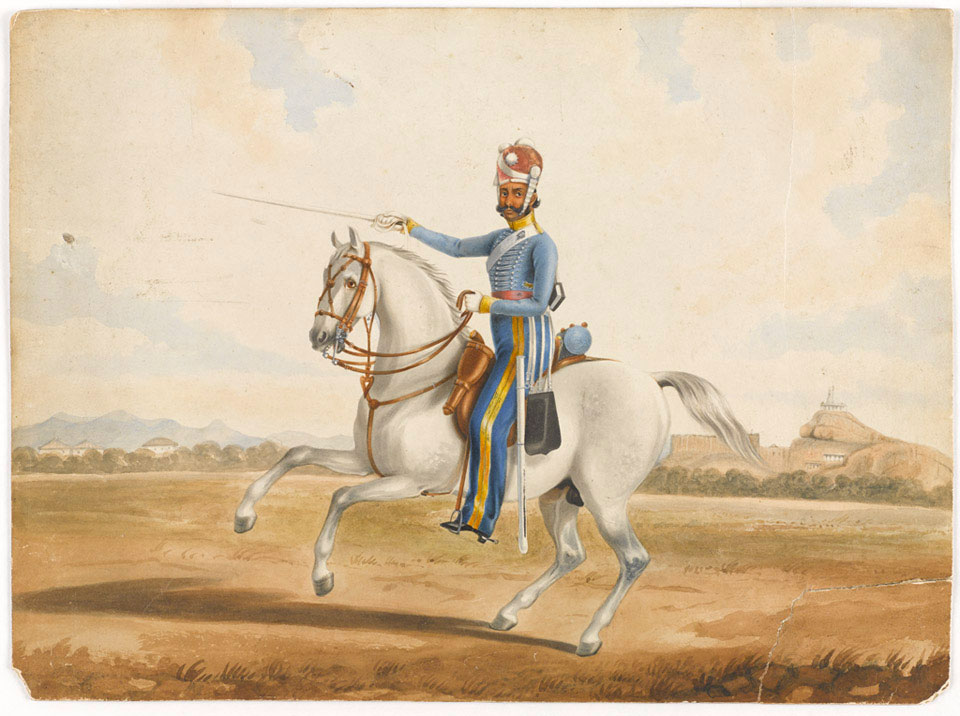
c. 1847 painting of a Madras Army sowar

Sowar (Urdu: سوار, also sawar or siwar meaning "the one who rides" or "rider", from Persian sawār, from the Sasanid Persian Aswār, from the Achaemenid Persian Asabāra) was originally a rank during the Mughal Empire. Later, during the British Raj, it was the name in Anglo-Indian usage for a horse-soldier belonging to the cavalry troops of the native armies of British India and the feudal states. It is also used more specifically of a mounted orderly, escort or guard. It was also the rank held by ordinary cavalry troopers, equivalent to sepoy in the infantry — this rank has been inherited by the modern armies of India and Pakistan. The rank higher is Acting Lance Daffadar.

== History ==
An image from the Carnatic Wars features a Sowar armed with a musket.

Sowar has been used as the name of a line of wrist-watches by the Swiss West End Watch Co.

== See also ==
- Suvari
