= Dhalo =

Dance from Goa

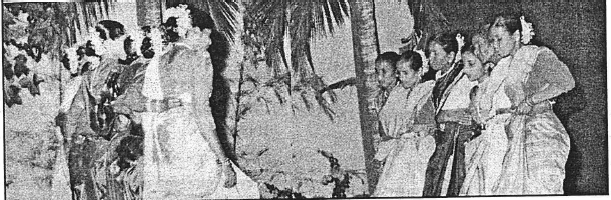
- Female Dhalo dancers
- Genre: Folk dance
- Origin: Goa, India

Dhalo is a popular ritual folk dance form Goa, India. The dance is performed by women and serves as a prayer of protection for their households. The songs to which the dance is performed are usually sung in Konkani language or Marathi. The themes of such songs are commonly religious or social in nature. It is conducted over a period of 1 week in the month of Pousha at the onset of winter. On the final day women dress up elaborately and draw caricatures of men.

Dhalo was chosen to be presented at the folk dance festival at New Delhi.

It is a traditional dance festival celebrated by women in the Konkan region, spanning areas from Sindhudurg to Majali-Karwar. The dances are primarily performed by women from communities such as the Kunbi, Bhandari, Nayak, Gabit, and Gawdi.

== Traditions ==
The festival is observed annually during the Hindu month of Pausha. The performances take place in an open space known as the 'Mand', which is typically located in front of a Tulsi vrindavan, within temple premises, or in a cleared courtyard of a house.

Women participating in Dhalo often adorn their hair with flowers such as Surangi, Onval, Aboli, Mogra, and Chafa. The nightly gatherings include unmarried women, married women, and widows. The proceedings are guided by knowledgeable women who act as mentors.

== Technique ==
In this form of dance, 12–24 women dance together in two parallel rows facing each other and with interlocked arms.

In comparison to Fugdi this dance is performed at a slower pace.

The festival period typically extends from the full moon of Pausha to the sixth day of the waning moon (Krishna Paksha). The commencement and conclusion of the festival are governed by traditional rights held by specific families.

=== Opening ===
The rituals begin with an offering to the village deity. Women place items such as betel leaves, betel nuts, sweets, and bananas on a plate, alongside a lit lamp. Following prayers for the welfare of the village, women apply sandalwood paste to their foreheads before gathering at the Mand.

=== The Dance ===
Participants form two rows facing each other, known as 'fanti'. They dance by holding hands or placing arms around each other's waists, moving forward and backward while singing. The songs traditionally focused on themes related to Radha and Krishna.

=== Closing ===
On the final night, which is considered the most significant, the festivities continue until dawn. The conclusion involves specific rituals, such as the distribution of offerings and the final performance of the Dhalo, after which the Mand is cleaned.

== Cultural significance ==
Songs performed during the festival reflect a mix of traditional themes, including episodes from the Ramayana and Mahabharata, as well as modern influences from Marathi and Hindi cinema. The festival is also celebrated by the Christian-Kunbi community.
