= Suvari =

Suvari or Süvari (Ottoman Turkish: سوارى; Turkish: Süvari, "cavalry", from Persian Sawār) is a Turkish or Estonian surname. As a Turkish surname it means "cavalry soldier".

It may refer to:

- Adnan Suvari (1926–1991), Turkish football coach
- Mena Suvari (born 1979), American actress

== See also ==
- Sowar
