= António Fortunato de Figueiredo =

Indian conductor and violinist (1903–1981)

Maestro ComSE António Fortunato de Figueiredo
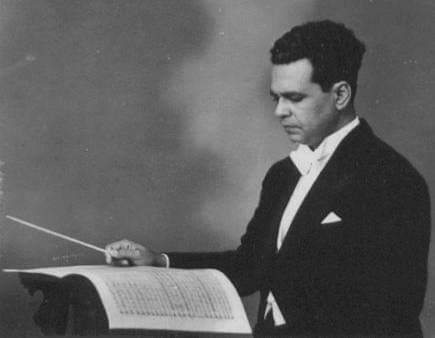
- De Figueiredo during a performance
- Born: 20 August 1903; Loutolim, Goa, Portuguese India, Portuguese Empire (now in India)
- Died: 1981 (aged 77–78)
- Education: University of Lisbon; National Conservatory of Lisbon; University of Paris
- Occupations: Conductor; violinist
- Known for: India's first conductor of western classical music

Maestro António Fortunato de Figueiredo ComSE (20 August 1903 – 1981) was a Goan conductor and violinist. He was India's first conductor of western classical music.

== Early life and education ==
António Fortunato de Figueiredo was born in Nacordá-Loutolim, in Goa (Portuguese India), the son of Goan Catholic parents Gabriel de Figueiredo and Ermelinda Parras e Figueiredo. He learnt the first rudiments of music at a primary school under a local teacher. Whilst studying at the lyceum of Panjim, he learnt the violin and soon became an accomplished player.

He went to Portugal in 1927 to pursue an arts degree at the University of Lisbon, but transferred to the National Conservatory of Lisbon (Portuguese: Conservatório Nacional de Lisboa), graduating with a higher education degree in violin in 1932. He then proceeded to Paris to study at the Faculty of Music and Musicology of the University of Paris.

== Career ==
On his return to Goa in 1936, António was appointed the choir-master at the lyceum of Panjim. He organised and directed choral groups (Portuguese: Orfeões) and string ensembles (Portuguese: Tunas), which staged many performances in Loutolim and Panjim, most of them in aid of charity foundations.

Soon after founding the Goa Symphony Orchestra, Figueiredo convinced the Portuguese government to found the Music Academy of Portuguese India (Portuguese: Academia de Música da Índia Portuguesa), modelled on the lines of the National Conservatory of Lisbon.

Figueiredo gave a number of lectures on music and the history of music which were broadcast by Goa's Portuguese Radio and later by the All India Radio, Panjim under their Portuguese programme Renascença (English: Rebirth), at the Institute Menezes Braganza, and Clube Nacional.

== Honours ==
Figueiredo was made Knight of the Order of St. James of the Sword in 1961. He also received accolades from the Institute Menezes Braganza and the Rotary Club.
