= Zoti =

Zoti are wedding songs sung during the preparation of food during weddings in Goa, India.
