= Fell (music) =

Fell is a music genre performed by Goan Catholic men and women during the Goa Carnival before the Lent in Goa, India.
