= Mhadalem =

Musical instrument

Mhadalem (Konkani: म्हादळें) is a Goan percussion instrument. It is a baked clay cylinder covered with monitor lizard skin at both ends. The mhadalem is in danger of dying out and being lost as its use is declining. It has to some extent been replaced by the pakhavaj. Since the gar or monitor lizard whose skin is used as the membrane of the drum is endangered and cannot be hunted, goat skin is sometimes used instead as the membrane, as is happening with the ghumot.
