= Fugdi =

Indian folk dance in Goa and Konkan

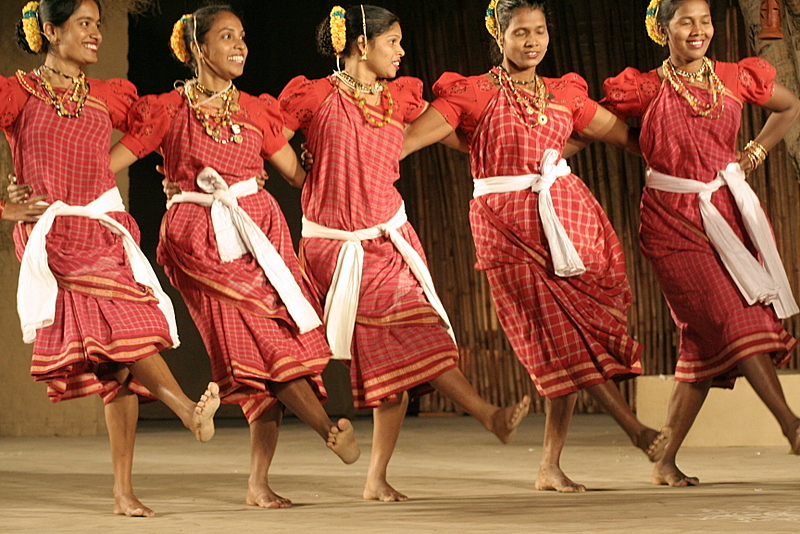
Fugdi Dancers from South Goa

Fugdi is a traditional folk dance performed by women in the Goa and Konkan regions. It is traditionally performed on the sacred ground (maan) during the Dhalo festival and in front of the deity Ganesha during the festival of Ganesh Chaturthi.

== Performance and attire ==
During the dance, women wear a tightly draped nine-yard saree (navvari kapad) in the kanshata style. They adorn their hair with garlands (venis) of Abolem or other varieties of flowers and wear gold ornaments on their bodies.

The performance typically does not involve any musical instruments. Instead, the participants stand in a circular formation, clapping their hands and singing while spinning around. The songs performed during the dance are predominantly composed by women themselves. These compositions frequently focus on the challenges and struggles of domestic life, though they occasionally feature hymns praising regional deities such as Radha and Krishna. During the Dhalo festival, which is an exclusive festival for women, participants engage in the dance openly on the sacred ground without any hesitation or inhibition.

== Variations ==
Fugdi has several distinct forms, with Saadi Fugdi, Kalashi Fugdi, and Katti Fugdi being the primary varieties.

=== Kalashi Fugdi ===
This variant is performed by Kokanastha Brahmin women during the Mahalakshmi Vrata observed in the Hindu month of Ashwin. In Goa, it is prominently practiced in the Sattari region. Performers hold water pots (kalash) in their hands and place them near their mouths, creating a "phoo-phoo" sound while spinning in circles. No songs are sung during this variation.

=== Katti Fugdi ===
In this variation, performers hold coconut shells (katti) in both hands. Instead of clapping their hands, they strike the shells against each other to maintain the rhythm of the dance.

=== Nagdi Fugdi ===
Historically, individuals would make ritual vows to perform Nagdi Fugdi to be blessed with a child or to overcome severe hardships. The vow was fulfilled before Ganesha or local deities. On the sixth day after a child's birth (Sati), women would gather inside the room of the postpartum mother, close the doors, and perform the dance without clothing. This practice has been discontinued in modern times.

== Community and regional variations ==
=== Kunbi and Gavda communities ===
In the Kunbi and Gavda communities, men also participate in Fugdi alongside women. Unlike other forms of the dance, this version incorporates musical instruments, specifically the ghumat, mhadle, and kansalem.

=== Maharashtra style ===
In Maharashtra, Fugdi is performed using a distinct method where two women stand facing each other, hold hands, and spin around in circles. This format is commonly observed during festivals such as Nag Panchami, Mangalagaur, and Hartalika. The regional variations of Fugdi in Maharashtra include Dandafugdi, Eka hatachi fugdi (single-handed fugdi), Bas fugdi, Zimma, Jaate, Nakhulyo and Bhui-fugdi. Some of these Maharashtrian variations are also observed to a certain extent in Goa.

=== Competitions ===
In addition to being a dance form, fugdi is sometimes done as a competitive event (such as in the Chhattisgarhiya Olympics), in which case the participant who can last the longest while performing the fugdi dance wins.

== See also ==
- Deknni
- Shigmo
- Mando
- Dulpod
