= Kansallem =

Kansalem (Konkani: कांसाळें) is a Goan percussion instrument. It is a large copper, bronze or brass cymbal or gong. It is an idiophone, that is, the entire instrument vibrates to produce sound. The instrument's name may have come from the word kans, meaning 'bronze'.
