= Mando (music) =

Luso-Goan musical tradition

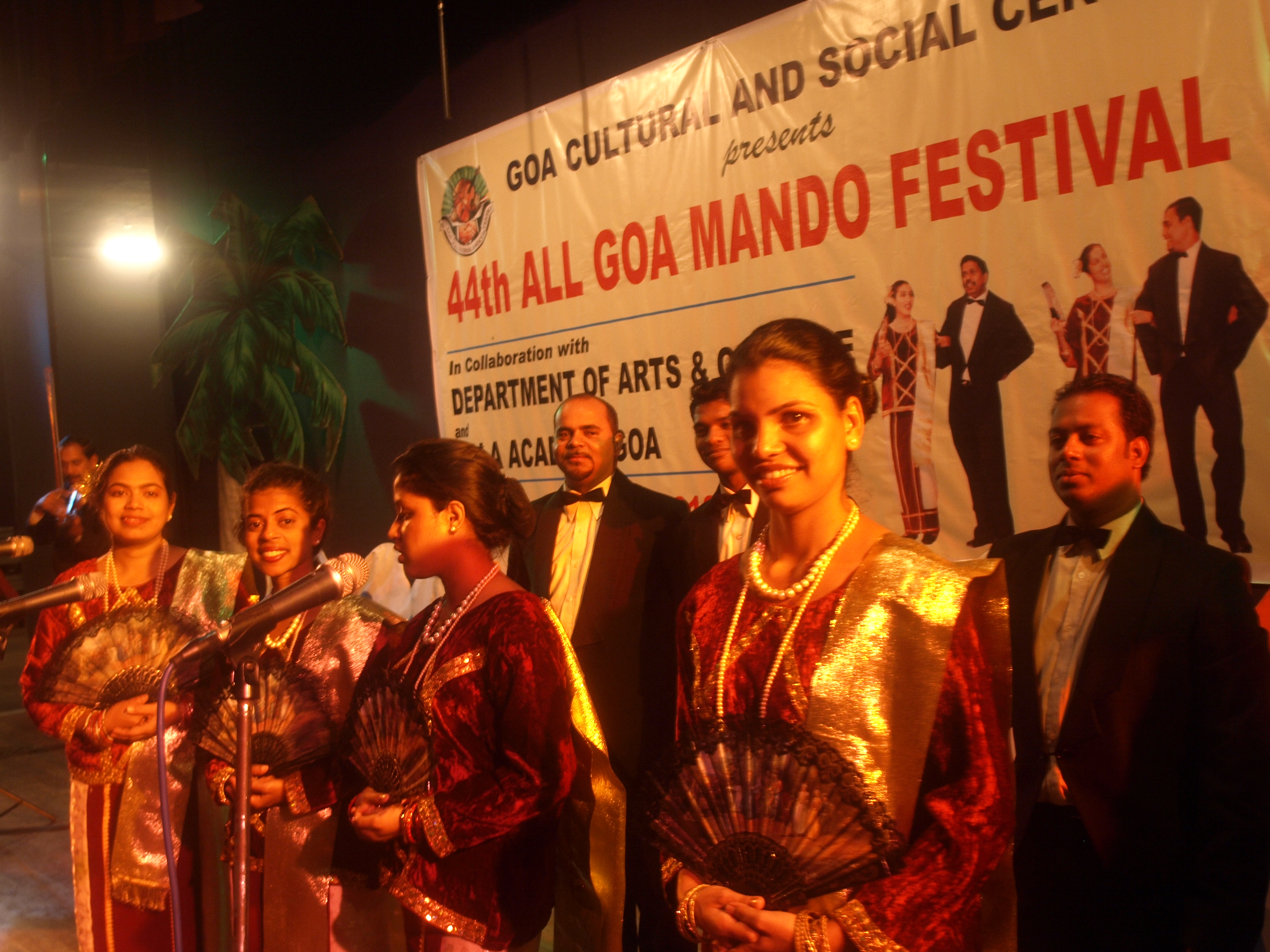
"Mando Festival" in Goa.

Mando (Goan Konkani: Mannddô) is a musical form that evolved during the 19th and 20th centuries among the Goan Catholics. It represents a meeting point of local Goan (Goa was a part of Portugal at that point of time) and western musical traditions.

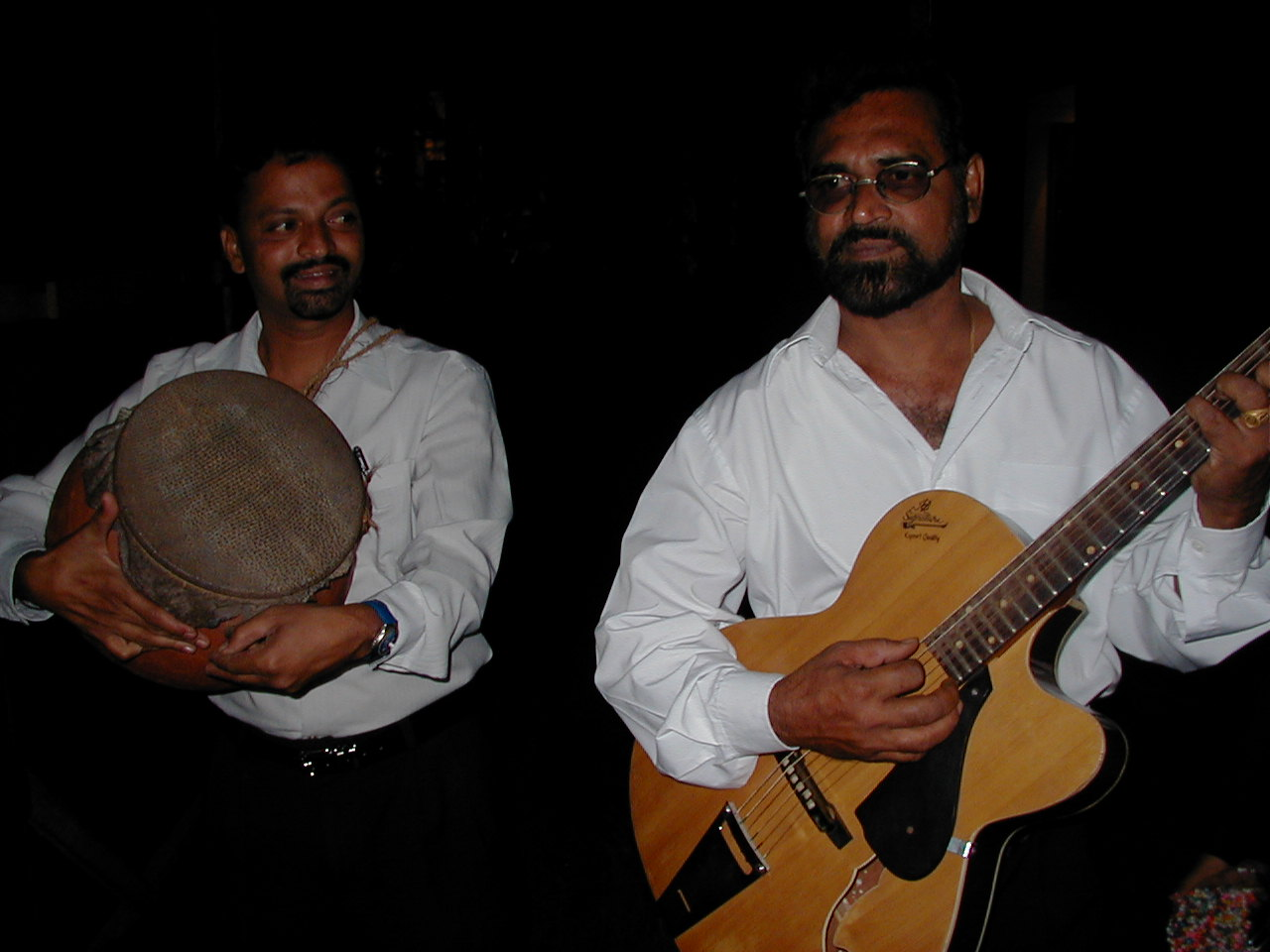
The music has elements of both Indian and western culture. Traditional musicians of the Goan Mando, ready up on their instruments.

The music has elements of both traditional Goan and western culture. The men wear formal coats while women wear Western dress.

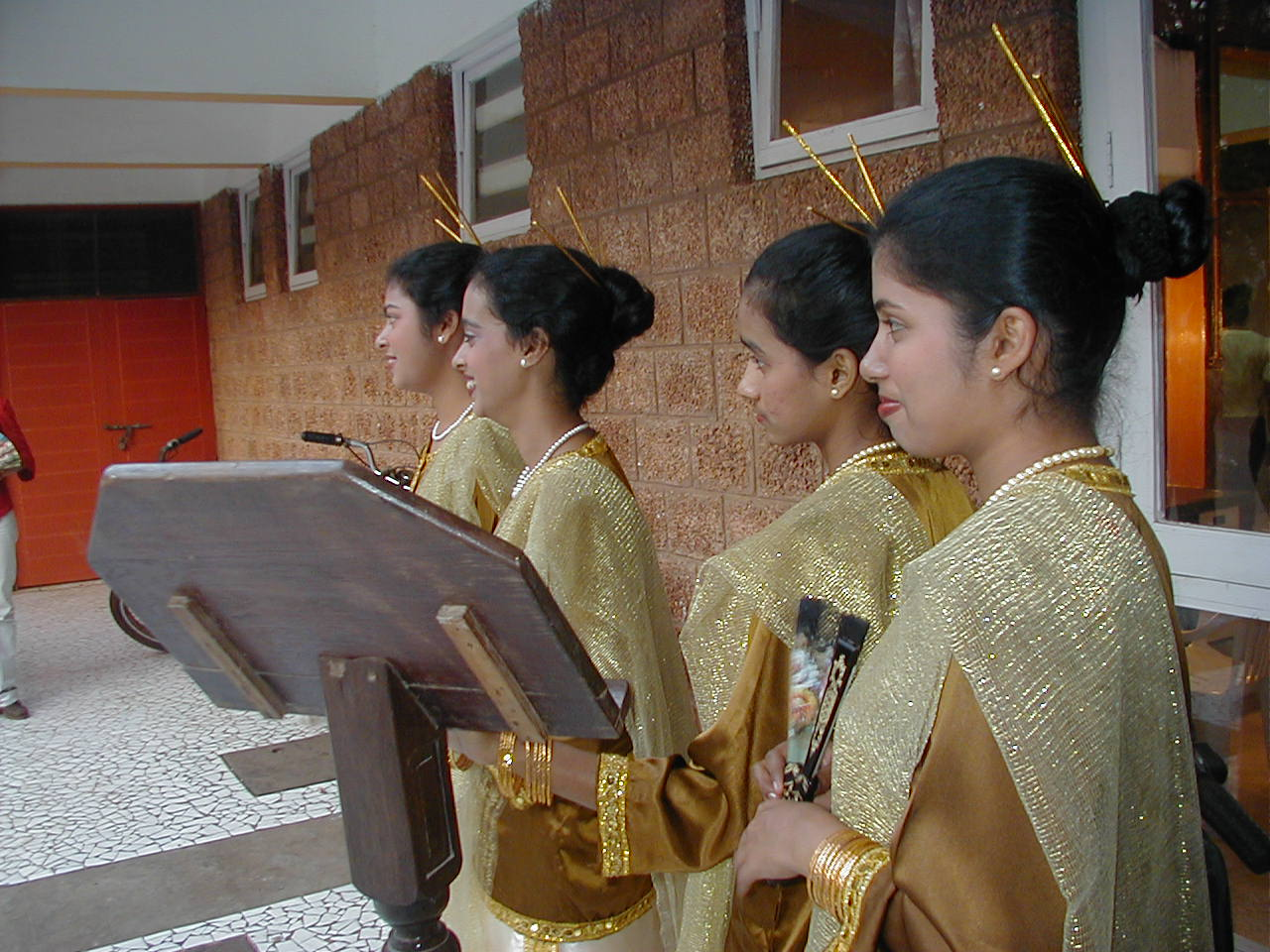
The dress worn during the mando dance was of velvet or silk, red, blue or green in colour, embroidered with gold (rarely with silver) threads. The "Mando Festival" at the Kala Academy, with performers decked up for the event. Goa.

The dress worn during the Mando dance was of velvet or silk; red, blue, or green in colour; embroidered with gold (rarely with silver) threads. A white or blue shawl was worn. The socks had to be white and the slippers ornamented.

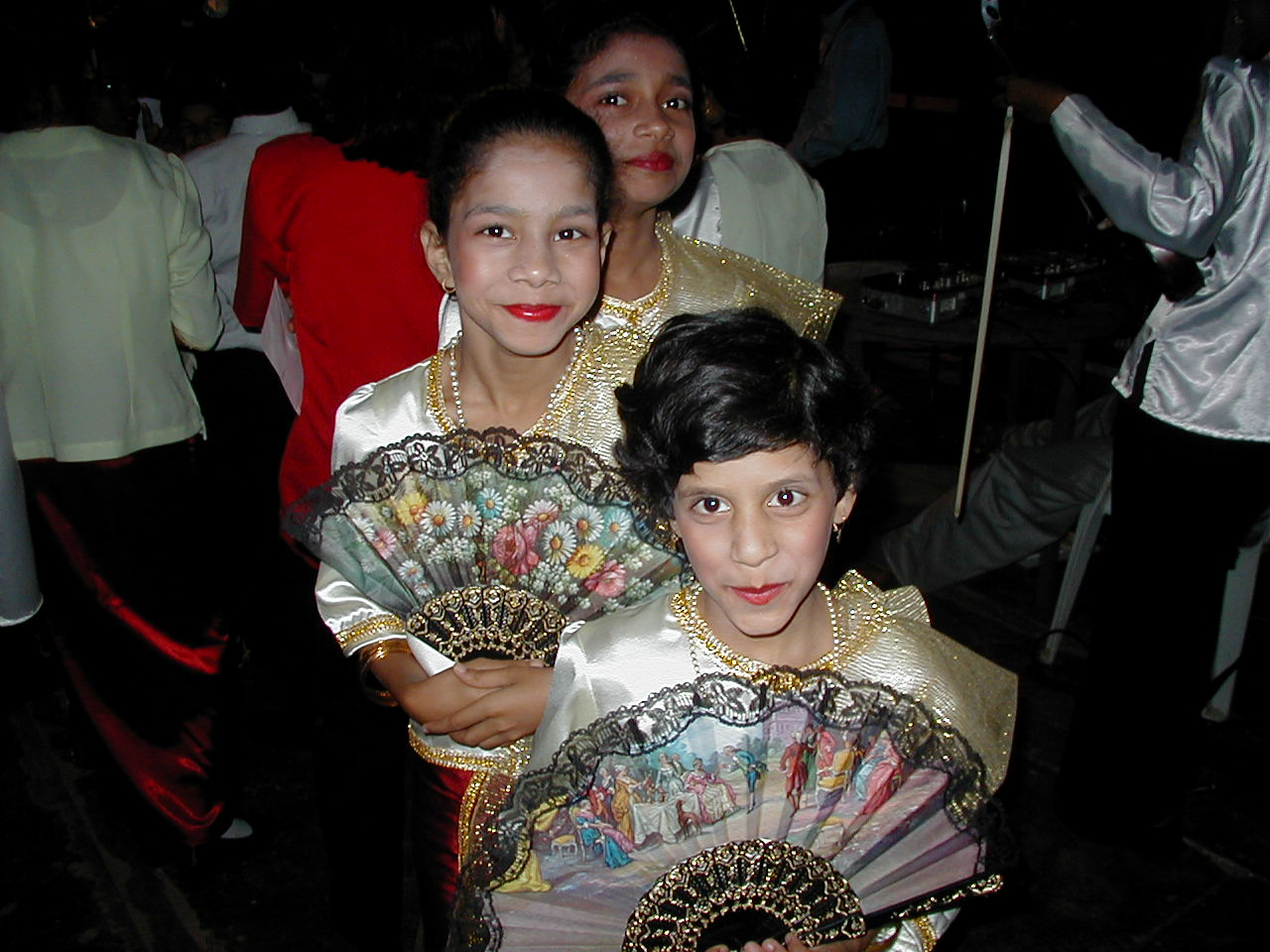
This was all graced with a fan, which enhanced the lady's mood with a secret charm during the dance. Singers of the Mando (Konkani folk music).

This was all graced with a fan, which enhanced the lady's mood with a secret charm during the dance. Nowadays, Mando’s are highlighted with their dance respective of their song. The Konkani plural of Mannddô is Mannddem. The major theme of Mando’s is love. The charming singing enhances the performance.

Instruments used in Mando music are guitars, violins and the Ghumot drum.

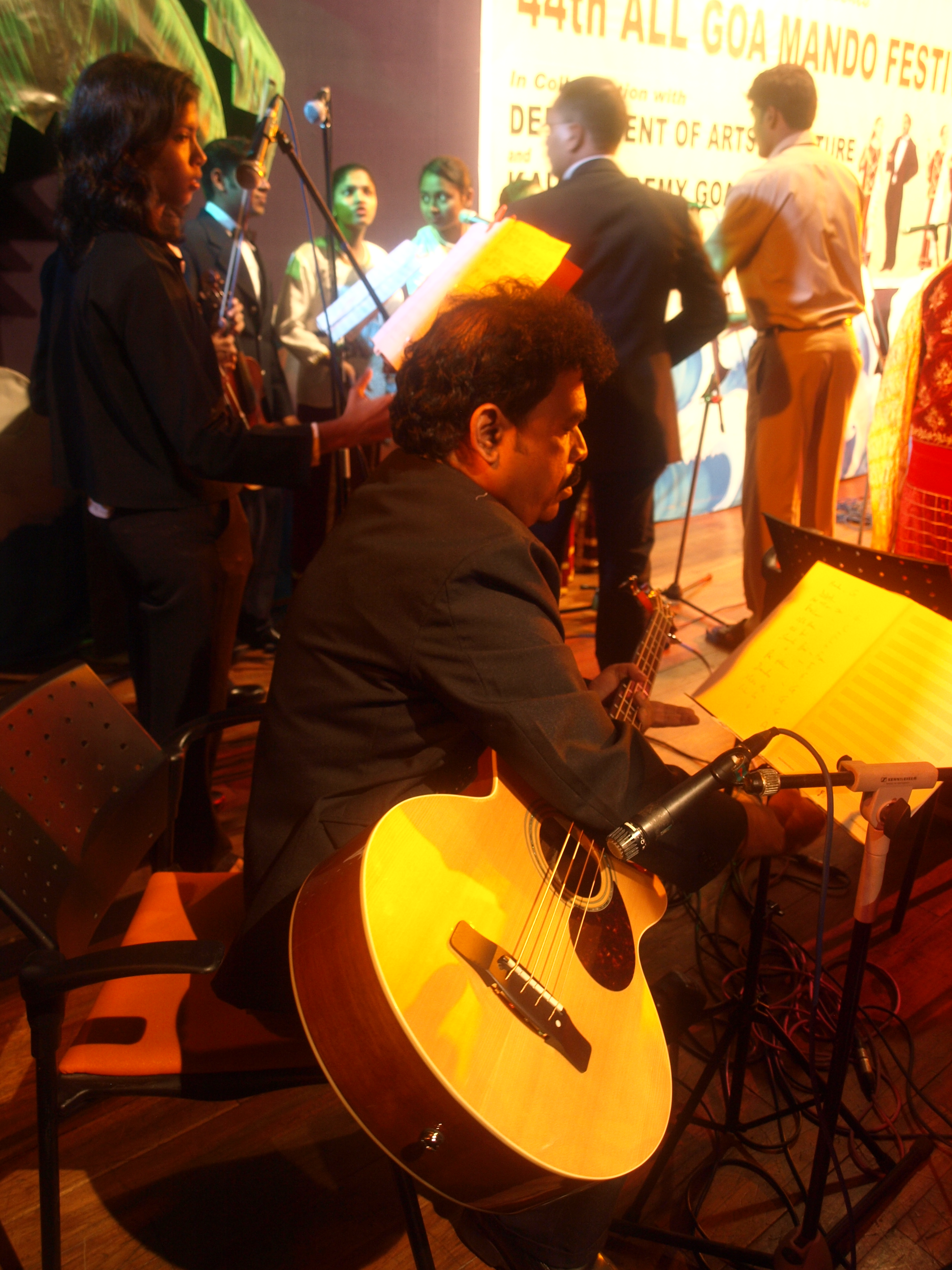
Musicians ready for the Mando stage. Konkani music. Goa.

The accent in Konkani is almost always on the last syllable. The Konkani dialect used in the classical Mando’s is that of Salcette, particularly as spoken in the villages of Benaulim, Curtorim, Cortalim, Dabolim, Dramapur, Loutolim, Margao-Fatorda, Quelossim, and Raia, where most of the Mando’s originated.

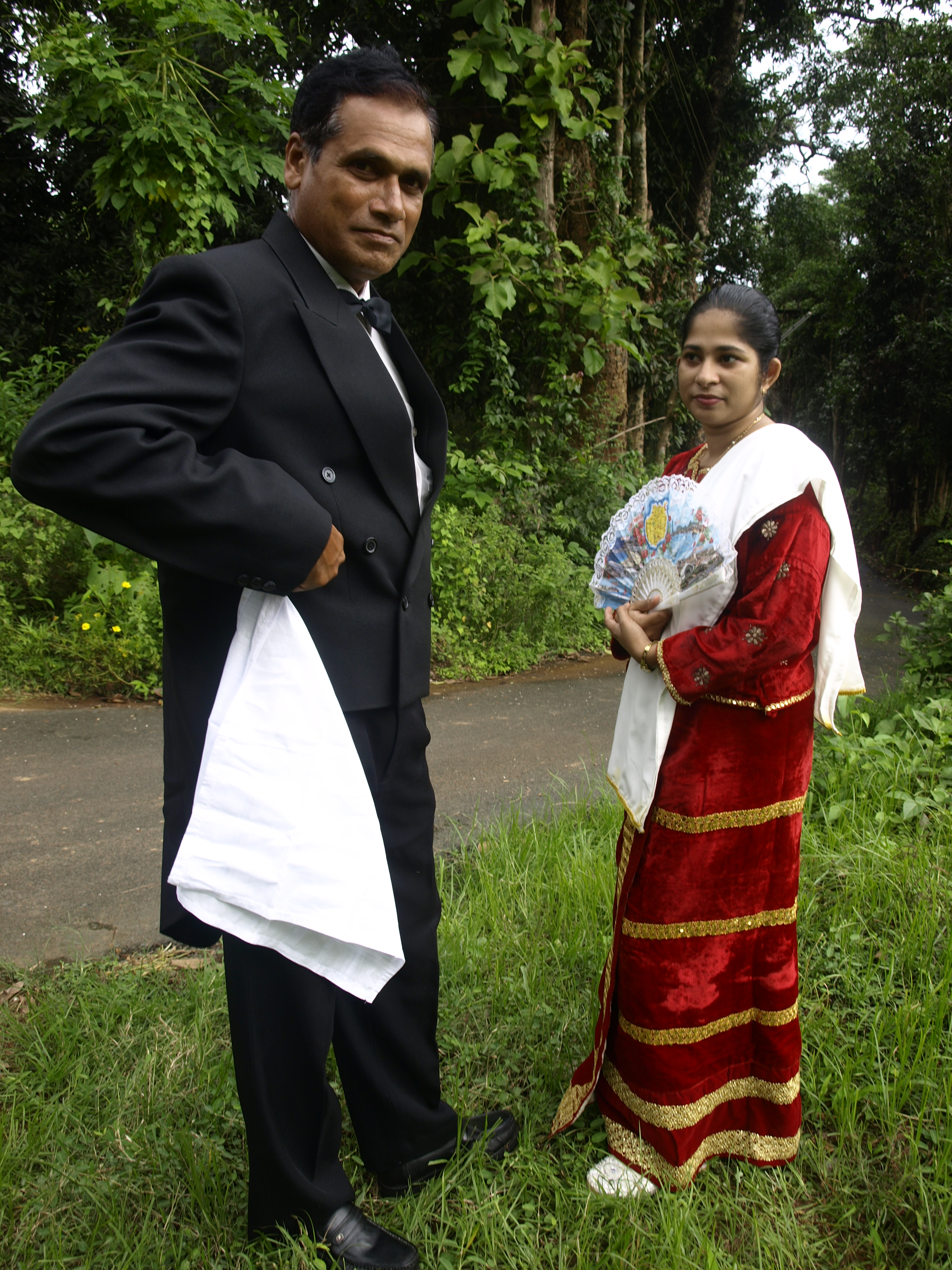
Performers of the Mando song-dance form pose for a photo on a rainy day outside their home in Curtorim.

Saxtti (Salcette) is the most musical of the Konkani dialects with its consistent use of elisions. One of the characteristics of this dialect is that words are stretched out in pronunciation with the addition of an extra vowel sound either in the middle of the words or at the end epenthesis. Thus the word dista is lengthened to disota and sanddlear into sanddilear. The suffixes "–i" and "–o" are commonly used to add an extra syllable to a line. Thus lharar becomes lharari and nekhetr becomes nekhetro. The full sound "o" is softened in this dialect. Thus roddonk becomes roddunk, mhozo becomes muzo. The possessive pronouns in the Mannddô have the Salcette form, as tugelem for tujem, mugelem for mujem or mhojem. Shorter forms are derived when the music needs to cut off a syllable, e.g. tuj’ kodden (koddem) instead of tujem koddem and mhak’ naka instead of mhaka naka. Not only the phonetics correspond to the Salcette dialect but also words like masollî or masllî for "fish" instead of nistem or nustem, e.g. “Dongrari fulo nam, doriant masllî punn nam”. A girl or a woman is addressed with "rê" (same as a man) instead of "gô" and use the pronoun "ti" instead of "tem".

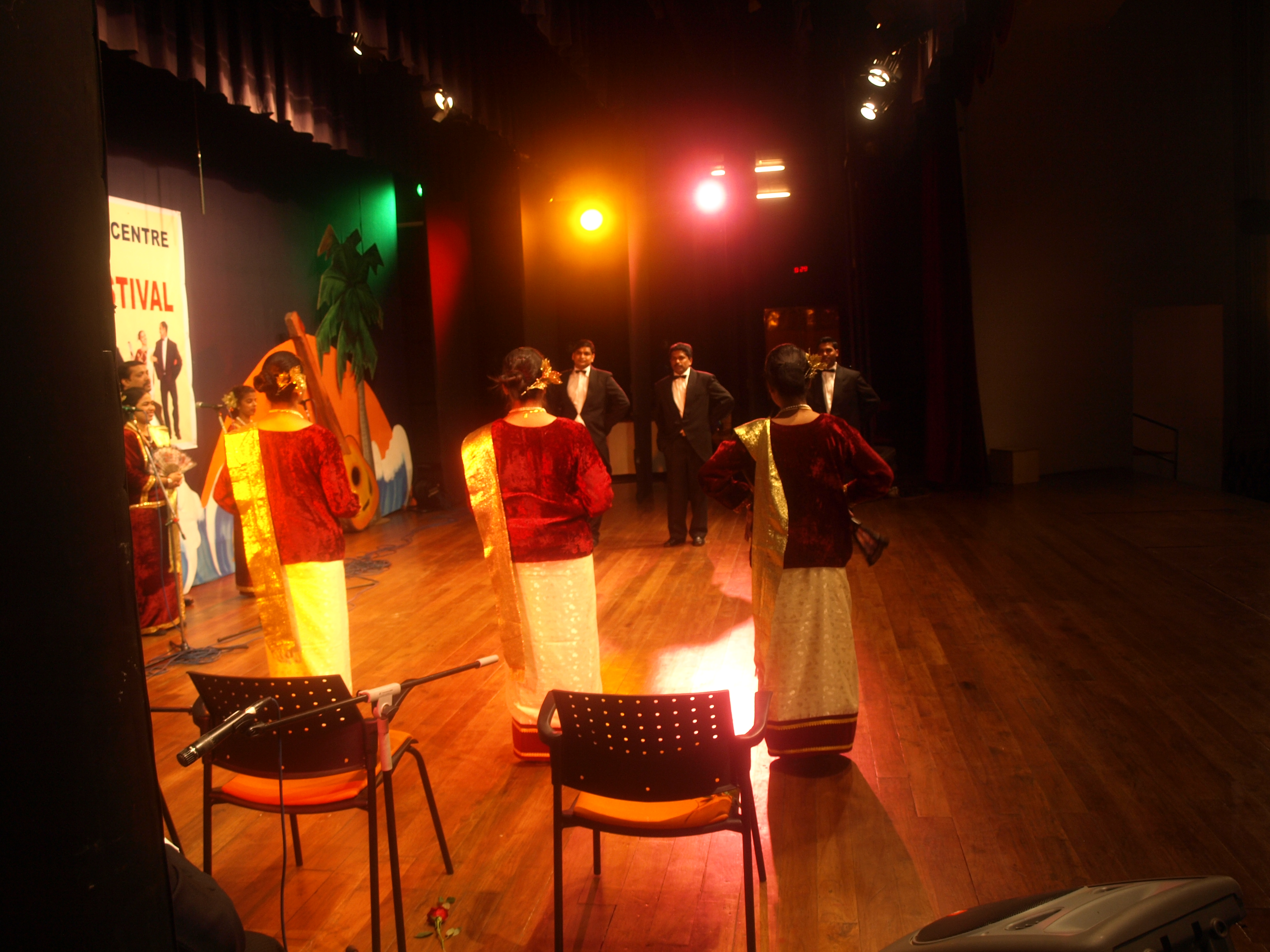
Mando dancers on stage, Goa.

The Mando is mostly a monologue, in the first person singular or plural, except for the historical narratives. In some Mando’s, however, one person addresses another, who in turn replies. Singing is accompanied by gentle turning sideways to the rhythm, thus creating both a visual and auditory performance.

Some famous mandos are:

- Bara Tera Vorsam Zalim
- Dovem Rozericho Collo
- Gupit Môg Bhurgeaponnancho
- Sangato Moga Tuzo

== See also ==
- Dekhnni
- Dulpod
- Fugdi
