= Deknni =

Semi-classical Goan dance

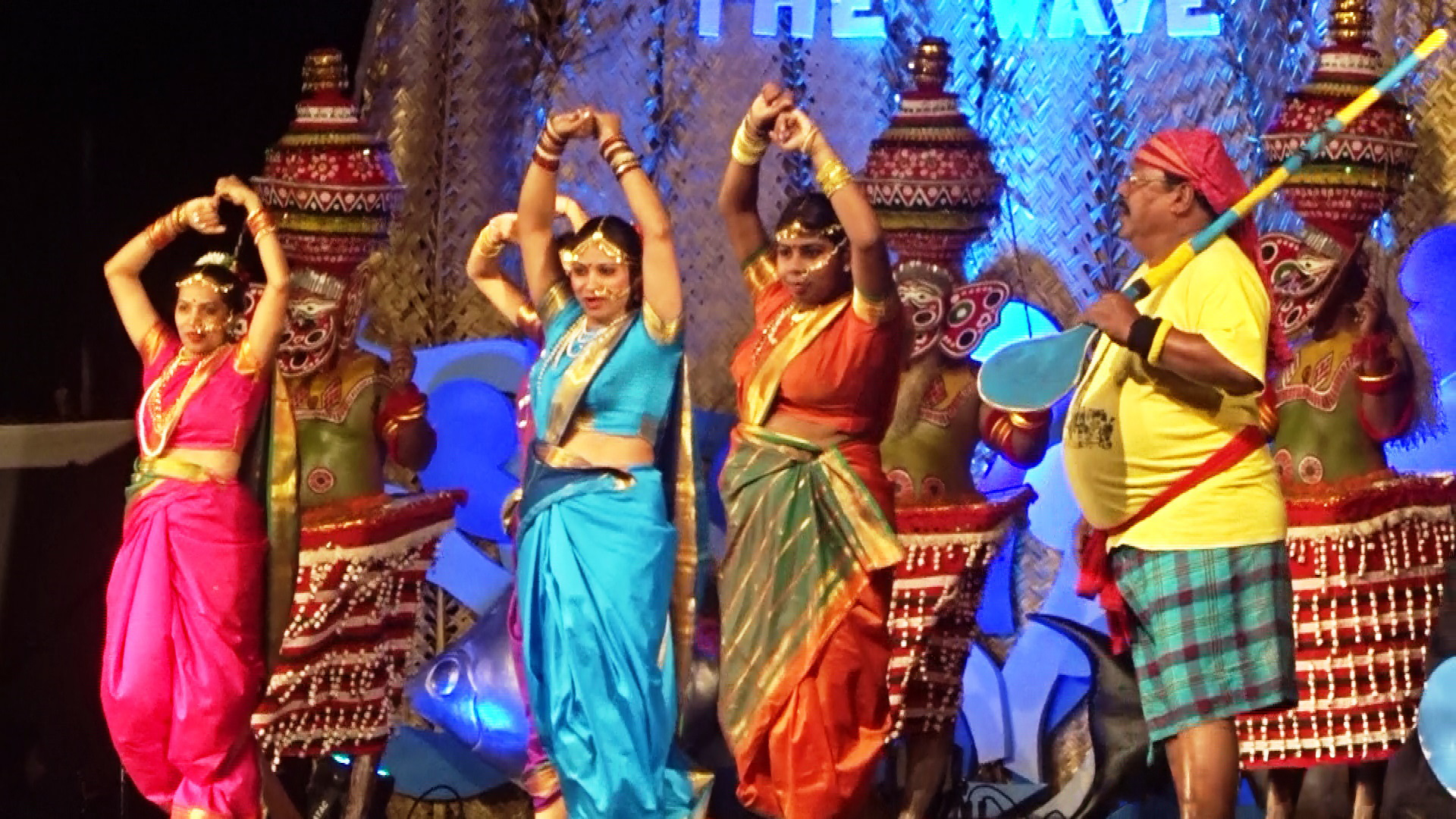
Dekhni dance at Vagator

Deknni (also spelled dekhnnî, dekni, dekṇi, dekhṇi) is a semi-classical Goan dance form. The plural of Dekhnnî in Konkani remains the same.

== Influence ==
Dekhni is characterized by its blend of Indian classical dance elements, such as those found in Kathak, Bharatanatyam, and Kuchipudi, performed to Western music.

== Etymology ==
The term "Dekhni" implies beauty, with the dance being so named because it is filled with such grace.

== History ==
While the exact origins of the dance are a subject of debate among experts, its history dates back approximately 150 years. One perspective suggests it originated from the dance performed by Devadasi women in front of temple palanquins. Another viewpoint attributes the development of the dance to the cultural influence or impositions of the Portuguese. A third theory posits that it was created as a fusion of Indian dance styles and Western music to entertain Portuguese officials.

== Performance ==
Dekhni is a graceful and attractive folk dance. During the performance, women traditionally wear a nav-vari (nine-yard) saree, adorned with flowers in their hair tied in a bun. They also wear traditional gold jewelry, specifically a nath (nose ring), and ghungroos (ankle bells) on their feet.

The musical accompaniment for the dance features a blend of instruments including the guitar, violin, and ghumot. The dancers perform to the rhythm of Western-style chorus songs. Both Hindu and Christian women participate in the dance. During the performance, the main dancers hold oil lamps (divzas) in their hands while dancing to the musical rhythm.

== Overview ==
One of the earliest deknni which may be dated around 1869 is Kuxttoba in which he is called "heir to India and terror of Goa", implying resistance to Portuguese rule. Kuxttoba was a member of the Salekar branch of the Rane family. Information about his birth, the reason and the course of his rebellion and the manner of his end are vague. He rebelled as an individual against the rule of the Portuguese in Goa but he presented no concept for a free Goa.

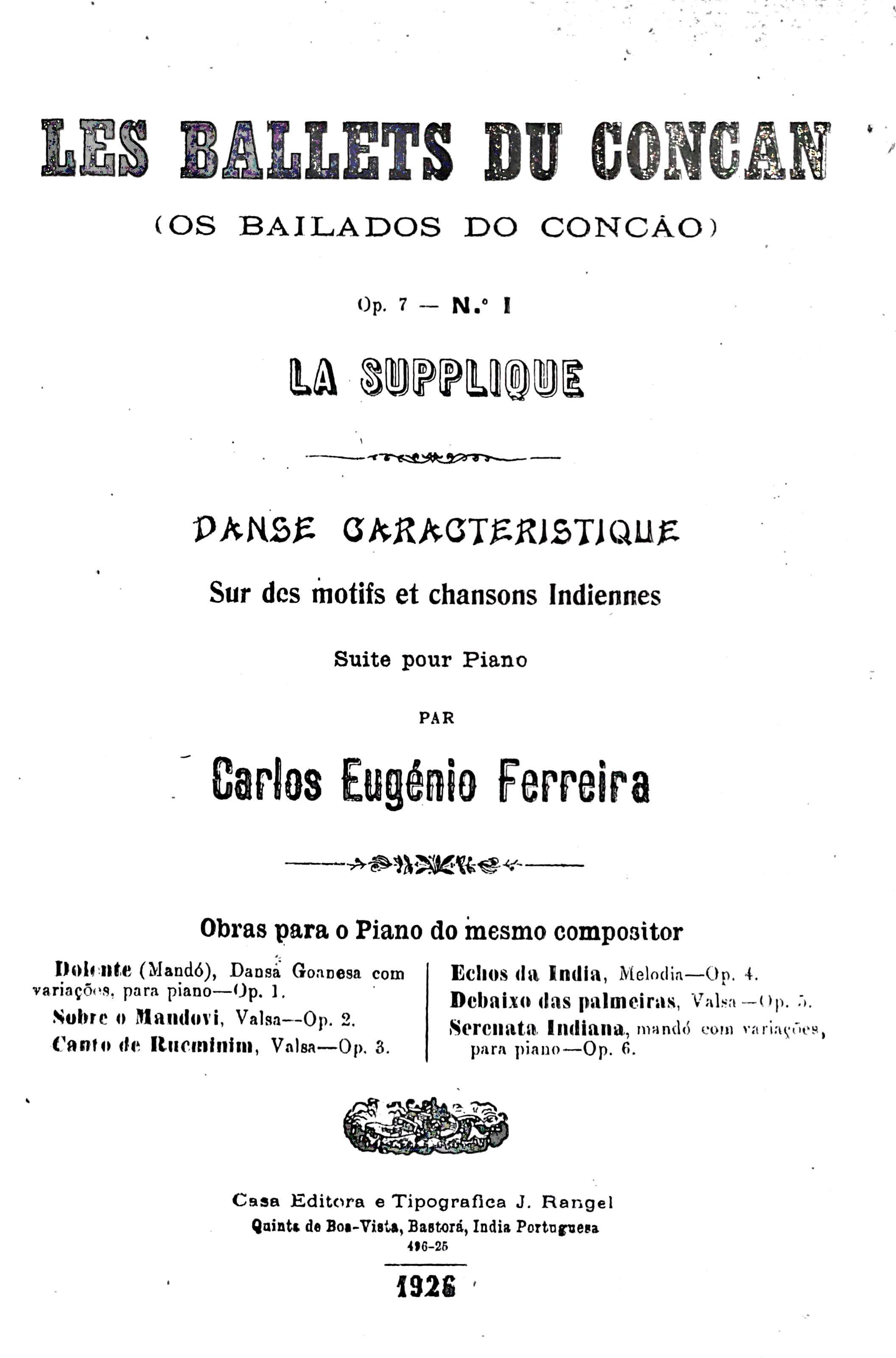
Hanv Saiba Poltoddi Voitam composed by Carlos Eugenio Ferreira Goa's most famous Dekhni song

One of the best known Dekhnnî songs is "Hanv Saiba Poltoddi Voitam" by Carlos Eugenio Ferreira (1869–1932) first published in Paris in 1895 and then in Goa in 1926 by Tipografia Rangel. The song was adapted by Raj Kapoor as Na mangoon sona chandi in his Hindi movie Bobby. The story that is depicted in this song is about two temple dancers who want to go for Damu's wedding and they approach the boatman to ferry them across the river. The boatman says, "No! The river is rough!" The dancers offer the boatman their gold jewellery; but the boatman is still firm. "No!" he says. So the dancers dance for the boatman and this time he ferries them across the river.

Hanv Saiba Poltoddi Voitam (I'm Crossing to the Other Side of the River)
| Konkani lyrics | Translation |
First stanza
| Hanv Saiba Poltoddi Voitam, Damulea lognaku voitam, Mhaka Saiba vattu dakhoi, Mhaka Saiba vattu kollona. | Oh, to the other side I'm crossing, I'm going for Damu's wedding, Show me the route, I pray, For I do not know the way. |
Second stanza
| Damulea mattu-vantu, Kolvontacho kellu, Damulea mattu-vantu, Kolvontacho kellu. | In the tent of Damu's wedding The dancing girls are playing. In the tent of Damu's wedding The dancing girls are playing. |
Refrain
Ghe, Ghe, Ghe (Take it, Sir!)
| Konkani lyrics | Translation |
| Ghe, ghe, ghe, ghe, ghe, ghe gâ Saiba, Mhaka naka gô, mhaka naka gô. Him mujea paiantlim painzonnam, ghe gâ Saiba, Mhaka naka gô, mhaka naka gô. | Take it, take, take, take, oh!, No, I don't want, I don't want it, oh no!, These anklets from my feet, do take them, gô!, No, I don't want, I don't want it, oh no! |
Source: Dekhnnî by Carlos Eugenio Ferreira (1869–1932) taken from the "Greatest Konkani Song Hits Vol. 1 (2009)".

Other deknni songs are:

- Arê tanddela
- Tendulechim tendulim
- Vaingem kazar zata mhunn
- Voddekara
- Vhoir vhoir dongrar
- Xeutim mogrim abolim

== See also ==
- Mando
- Dulpod
- Fugdi
