= Dulpod =

Goan folk song

Dulpod is a Goan dance song with quick rhythm and themes from everyday Goan life. The plural of dulpod in Konkani is dulpodam. The dulpod is a folk song, anonymous, freely improvised, and sometimes lacking in thematic unity. The tunes of the dulpod are usually in the six-eight measure, though the two-fourths are not uncommon. The dulpod is usually sung in sequence with a mando.

Farar-far zatai ranantu is one of the best known dulpods, a masterpiece of its genre. The composer sings: “The white soldiers are shooting at the Rane. The Rane are shooting at the white soldiers.” Of late, the dulpod Ya, ya, maya ya is often sung at the end of a sequence of mandos and dulpods. Some other dulpods are:

Cecila
Konkani lyrics	Translation
First stanza
Cecilia mhojem nanv. Cheddvam bhitor cheddum kuriso hanv.	Cecilia is my name. Of all I'm the smartest dame. It was Originated in Ponda
Repeat
Second stanza
Tum kurioso zaleari, Mughê matxi judi talhar kor.	If you are indeed so smart, My coat to fit me do cut.
Repeat
Third Stanza
Tughê judi talhar korunk? Irmanv mhughê bhurgi nhõi mot.	Should I cut to suit your coat? O big brother, childish I am not!
Repeat
Fourth Stanza
Sinalako ditam peru. Cecilia você quer ou não quero?	A guava as an advance I give you. Cecilia, don't you want or do you?
Repeat
Fifth Stanza
Mhaka naka tujem peru. Dileam puro mogachem uttoro.	Your guava indeed I do not desire. Your promise of love is all I require.
Repeat
Cecilia mhojem nanv.	Cecilia is my name.
Source: Dulpod taken from the Greatest Konkani Song Hits Vol. 1 (2009)

Other famous dulpods are:

- Ai lia lia lo
- Amani gamani
- Banalichea Monti sokolo
- Moddganvam thouiager
- Sant Antoninchea Dongrar
- Tollem sukolem
- Undir mhojea mama
- Vhoir, vhoir, vhoir kattakoi
- Ya, ya, maya ya

== See also ==
- Deknni
- Mando
- Fugdi
- Collection of Dulpods
