= Indian music (disambiguation) =

Indian music may refer to:

- Music from South Asia or the Indian subcontinent
  - Music of India
    - Music in ancient India
      - Ravanahatha, ancient Indian bowed string instrument
    - Indian classical music
      - Hindustani classical music, of northern India
      - Carnatic music, classical music of southern India
      - Classical Indian musical theatre
      - Raga, melodic mode in Indian classical music
      - Svara, note in the octave in Indian classical music
    - Hindu music
    - Buddhist music
    - Indian folk music
    - Hindi film music
    - Hindi wedding songs
    - Indian pop
    - Jazz in India
    - Indo-Caribbean music, of the Indian diaspora in the Caribbean
    - List of Indian musical instruments
    - List of Indian music families
    - List of Indian film music directors
    - Indian Music Industry, trust representing the Indian recording industry
    - Indian Music Experience Museum, Bengaluru, Karnataka, India
- Indigenous music of North America
  - Indigenous music of Canada
  - Native American music
- Music of Central America, and in particular, of its indigenous peoples
- Music of South America, and in particular, of its indigenous peoples; see List of South American folk music traditions
- Caribbean music, or West Indian music

== See also ==
- Oriental music (disambiguation)
