= My Name Is Anthony Gonsalves =

My Name Is Anthony Gonsalves may refer to:

- "My Name Is Anthony Gonsalves" (song), a Bollywood song by Kishore Kumar and Amitabh Bachchan from the 1977 film Amar Akbar Anthony
- My Name Is Anthony Gonsalves (film), a 2008 Bollywood film by Eeshwar Nivas, based on the song

== See also ==
- Anthony Gonzalez (disambiguation)
- Anthony Gonsalves (1927–2012), Indian composer, eponym of the song and film
