= Oriental music =

Oriental music may refer to:

- Asian Music (disambiguation)
  - Music of Asia
  - Indian music (disambiguation)
    - Music of India
      - Music in ancient India
        - Ravanahatha, ancient Indian bowed string instrument
      - Indian classical music
        - Hindustani classical music, of northern India
        - Carnatic music, classical music of southern India
        - Raga, melodic mode in Indian classical music
        - Svara, note in the octave in Indian classical music
        - Lavni songs and bharatnatyam music
      - Hindu music
      - Buddhist music
      - Indian folk music
      - Hindi film music
      - Indian pop
      - Jazz in India
  - Music of Sri Lanka
- Mizrahi music, of Mizrahi Jews from the Middle East
- Music of Turkey
  - Turkish music (style), in Western classical music
  - Ottoman music
- Shaabi, Egyptian folklore music
- Islamic music
  - Sufi music, within the mystical Sufi tradition of Islam
