= Goans in Hindi film music composition =

This article is about the contribution of Goans to the musical composition of Bollywood songs, associated with the Filmi genre.

== Introduction ==
Since the early 1900s, Goans were the main exponents of jazz and western music in India. Goans played a major role in Bollywood music until the 1980s, working for music directors like O.P.Nayyar, C. Ramchandra, Shankar Jaikishan, Laxmikant Pyarelal and S. D. Burman. They were credited under the designation 'music director' in large type in the credits, while the Goans' names rolled by in small letters as 'arrangers'. At the time, only Goans, having trained in Western music, knew how to compose music for orchestras, with a multitude of instruments playing in harmony.

Frank Fernand described the situation as follows: "The men who composed the scores for Hindi films couldn't write music and had no idea of the potential of the orchestras they employed. They would come to the studio and sing a melody to their Goan amanuensis, or pick out the line on a harmonium. The Goan assistant would write it out on sheet paper, then add parts for the banks of strings, the horn sections, the piano and the percussion." But the assistant wasn't merely taking dictation: It was his job to craft the introductions and bridges between verse and chorus. Drawing from their bicultural heritage and their experience in the jazz bands, the Goans gave Bollywood music a unique charm. Then they would rehearse the orchestras, which were staffed almost entirely by Goans since it was mainly Goans who knew how to play these Western instruments.

To Frank Fernand, the music directors were mere subcontractors, men whose main job was liaising with the financiers. "We arrangers did all the real work. They'd show off to the directors and producers and try to show that they were indispensable. But to be a music director, salesmanship was more important than musicianship."

== Anthony Gonsalves ==
Anthony Prabhu Gonsalves (born 1928) is an Indian musical composer and teacher from the village of Majorda (near Margao in Goa, India) who, during the mid-1950s, attempted to merge the symphonies of his Goan heritage with the Hindustani melodies and rhythms in films of the day.

He found his first job in the city as a violinist in the group of the composer Naushad in 1943. He taught the violin to R.D. Burman and Pyarelal Ramprasad Sharma (of the Laxmikant Pyarelal duo) and has worked with most of the legendary composers of the 1950s and 1960s. A few examples of his work are B.R. Chopra (Naya Daur, Waqt), Naushad (Dillagi), and Chetan Anand (Haqeeqat). The song "My Name Is Anthony Gonsalves" was Pyarelal's tribute to his violin teacher.

== Chic Chocolate ==
Antonio Xavier Vaz (born 1916), known as Chic Chocolate, was from Aldona. He assisted C. Ramchandra, who is popularly credited with having introduced swing into Bollywood. Tunes like Ina Mina Dika from Aasha and Gore Gore O Banke Chore from Samadhi("Gore Gore" is actually a copy of the Samba song "Chico Chico from Puerto Rico")" bear Chic's unmistakable signature. His stamp is also audible on the Cuban percussion opening of Shola Jo Bhadke, a tune from Albela.this song is actually a copy of "Delgodo Samba" and not originally from Chic Chocolate.

Chic and the Music Makers made an appearance in the film in the song's picturisation, with Chic seen smiling into the camera.[1]

== Chris Perry ==
Chris Perry also had a stint in the film studios, assisting Khayyam and working with such names as Lakshmikant and Pyarelal, R. D. Burman and Kalyanji Anandji. He served the film industry for twenty-five years as assistant to Hindi film music directors and performed in many Hindi films notably in Kabhi Kabhi and Trishul.

== Frank Fernand ==
Frank Fernand was among the first Goans in Bollywood and assisted known names like Anil Biswas, Kishore Kumar, Roshan, C. Ramchandra and others. Raj Kapoor's 'Barsat' was his major assignment with Shankar Jaikishan.

Fernand was music conductor for many films including Don, Hera Pheri, Zanjeer and Victoria No. 203. He was music assistant for a few films including Johny Mera Naam. His last assignment in the Hindi film industry was as the first assistant of Kalyanji Anandji.

== Sebastian D'Souza ==
Sebastian D'Souza was one of the most reputed arrangers in Bollywood, who did his best-known work with the duo of Shankar-Jaikishan between 1952 and 1975. His first break was with O. P. Nayyar. The first tune he arranged was Pritam aan milo, which was sung by C. H. Atma in 1955. He devised a system of notation that incorporated the microtones that characterised Indian melodies.

== Alfred Rose ==
Alfred Rose composed music for Bollywood films including the Hindi film Love in Goa.

== Remo Fernandes ==
In addition to singing for a large number of Hindi films, Remo Fernandes has also composed and written songs for the films Khamoshi: The Musical, Trikal and Jalwa (1987).

== N Datta aka Datta Naik ==
N. Datta aka Datta Naik, a local resident of Goa, started his film career as a music assistant of the great composer S D Burman. Datta assisted Dada Burman in a number of films. Datta was very impressed with the revolutionary songs of lyricist Sahir Ludhiyanvi. When Datta got his first chance to compose independently for Raj Khosla's Milaap (1955), he insisted for Sahir as the lyricist. The result was some very beautifully songs like 'Ye Baharon Ka Sama..' (Hemant, Lata), 'Jaate Ho To Jaao Par Jaoge Kahan..' (Geeta), etc. The music of Milaap became so popular that Datta came into the category of film industry's most eminent musicians.

Some unforgettable and mersmerising compositions which give the evidence of Datta's musical dexterity are: 'Sitare Raah Takte Hai..' (Lata), 'Main Tumhi Se Poochhti Hoon..' (Lata) from the film Black Cat. 'Aurat Ne Janm Diya Mardon Ko..' (Lata), 'Sambhal-e-Dil..' (Asha-Rafi) from the film Sadhna' 'Maine Chaand Aur Sitaron Ki Tamnna Ki Thi..' (Rafi) from the film Chandrakanta, 'Ashkon Me Jo Paya Hai..' (Talat) from the film Chandi Ki Deewar, 'Kis Jagah Jaayen..' (Asha) from Light House, 'Ab Wo Karam Karen..' (Rafi) from the film Marine Drive, 'Daaman Me Aag Laga Baithe..' (Rafi), 'Tere Pyar Ka Aasra Chahta Hoon..' (Mahendra) from the film Dhool Ka Phool, 'Aaj Ki Raat Nahi Shikwon..' (Mahendra) from Dharamputra and 'Laal Laal Gaal..' from the film Mr. X.

N Datta also gave music in the film named 'Datta Naik'. He had a very strong and long association with Sahir Ludhiyanvi as his lyricist in most of his films, till Chehre Pe Chehra (1980). Datta Naik was a sensible music director who use minimum orchestra to develop the required atmosphere as expressed in the song. He died on 30 December 1987.

== See also ==
- Jazz in India
