= Outline of ancient India =

The Indian subcontinent

The following outline is provided as an overview of and topical guide to ancient India:

Ancient India is the Indian subcontinent from prehistoric times to the start of Medieval India, which is typically dated (when the term is still used) to the end of the Gupta Empire around 500 CE.

== General history of Ancient India ==
An elaborate periodisation may be as follows:

=== Pre-history (Neolithic Age) (c. 8000–3500 BCE) ===
- Indian Pre-history Age (c. 10,000–3300 BCE)
- Bhirrana culture (7570–6200 BCE)
- Mehrgarh culture (c. 7000 – c. 2500 BCE)

=== Proto-history (Bronze Age) (c. 3500–1800 BCE) ===
Map of the world in 2000 BCE showing the Indus Valley Civilisation

- Indus Valley Civilisation (c. 3300 – c. 1300 BCE), including the "first urbanisation"
- Ahar–Banas culture (c. 3000 – c. 1500 BCE)
- Ochre Coloured Pottery culture (c. 2600–1200 BCE)
- Cemetery H culture (c. 1900–1300 BCE)

=== Iron Age (c. 1800–500 BCE) ===
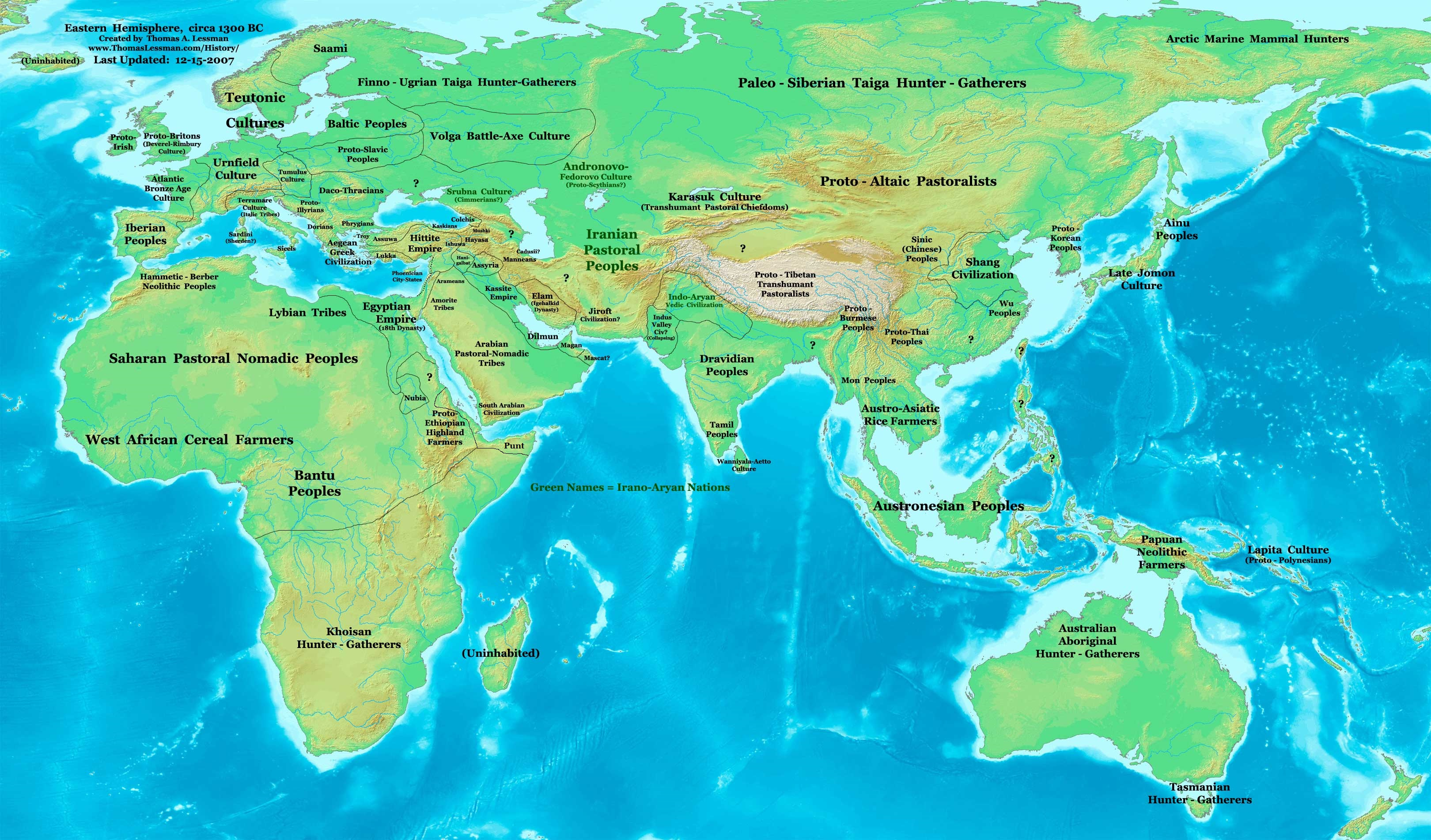
The Indo-Aryan Vedic civilization and main polities in Eurasia around 1300 BCE

- Iron Age India (c. 1800 – c. 200 BCE)
  - Vedic civilisation (c. 1700 – c. 600 BCE)
    - Black and red ware culture (c. 1500–700 BCE) in Western Ganges plain
    - Northern Black Polished Ware (c. 1200–500 BCE)
    - Painted Grey Ware culture (c. 1200 or 700–300 BCE)
  - Brihadratha dynasty (c. 1700 – c. 682 BCE)
  - Gandhara Kingdom (c. 1500 – c. 545 BCE)
  - Kuru Kingdom (c. 1200 – c. 345 BCE)
  - Indian Iron Age kingdoms (c. 600 – c. 345 BCE)
  - Pandyan Kingdom (c. 600 BCE – c. 650 CE)

=== Early Historic (c. 500 BCE–300 CE) ===
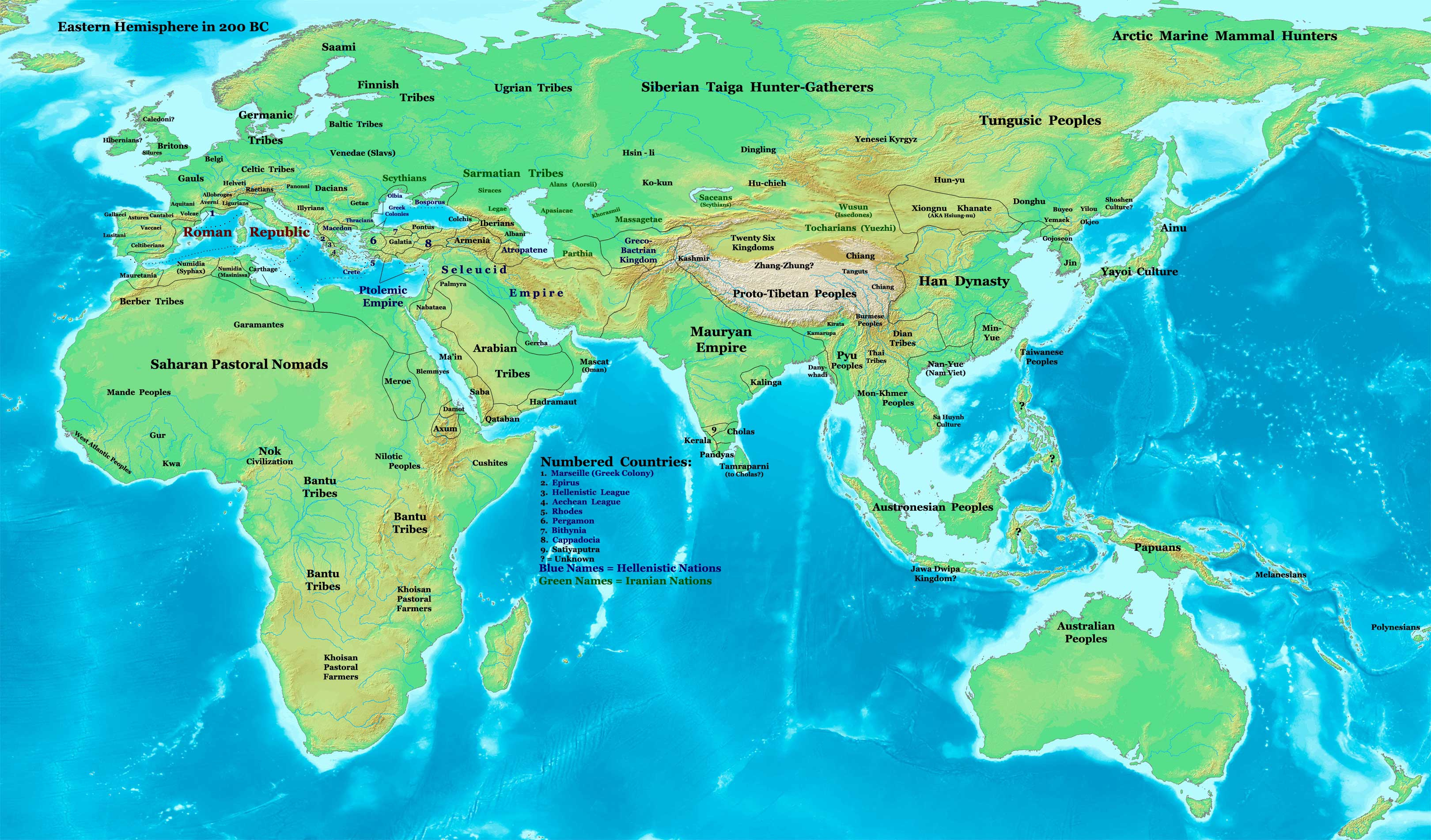
The Maurya Empire and main polities in Eurasia around 200 BCE

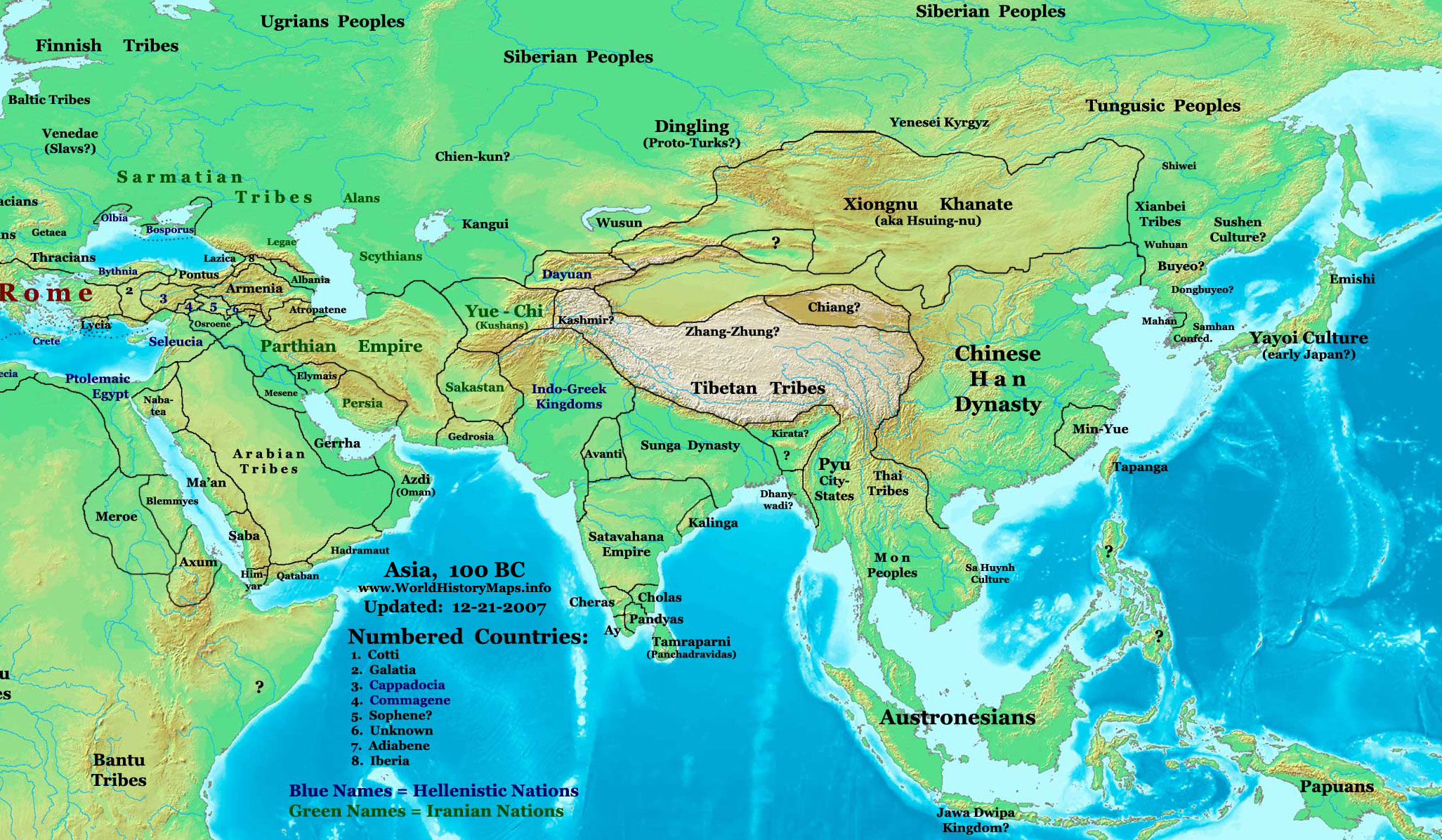
Map of the world in 100 BCE showing the Indo-Greek Kingdoms

- Pradyota dynasty (c. 546–408 BCE)
- Haryanka dynasty (c. 544–413 BCE)
- Shaishunaga dynasty (c. 413–345 BCE)
- Nanda Empire (c. 345 – c. 322 BCE)
- Maurya Empire (c. 322–185 BCE)
- Sangam period (c. 300 BCE – c. 300 CE)
  - Pandyan Kingdom (c. 600 BCE–1650 CE)
  - Chera Kingdom (c. 300 BCE–1102 CE)
  - Chola Kingdom (c. 300 BCE–1279 CE)
- Kalinga Empire (until 261 BCE)
- Mahameghavahana Empire (c. 2600–300 CE)
- Satavahana Empire (230 BCE–220 CE)
- Kuninda kingdom (c. 2600–350 CE)
- Shunga Empire (c. 185–73 BCE)
- Kanva dynasty (c. 73–26 BCE)
- Indo-Greek Kingdom (180 BCE–10 CE)
- Kushan Empire (30–375 CE)
- Indo-Scythian Kingdom ( c. 12 BCE–395 CE)

=== Classical Period (c. 300–550 CE) ===
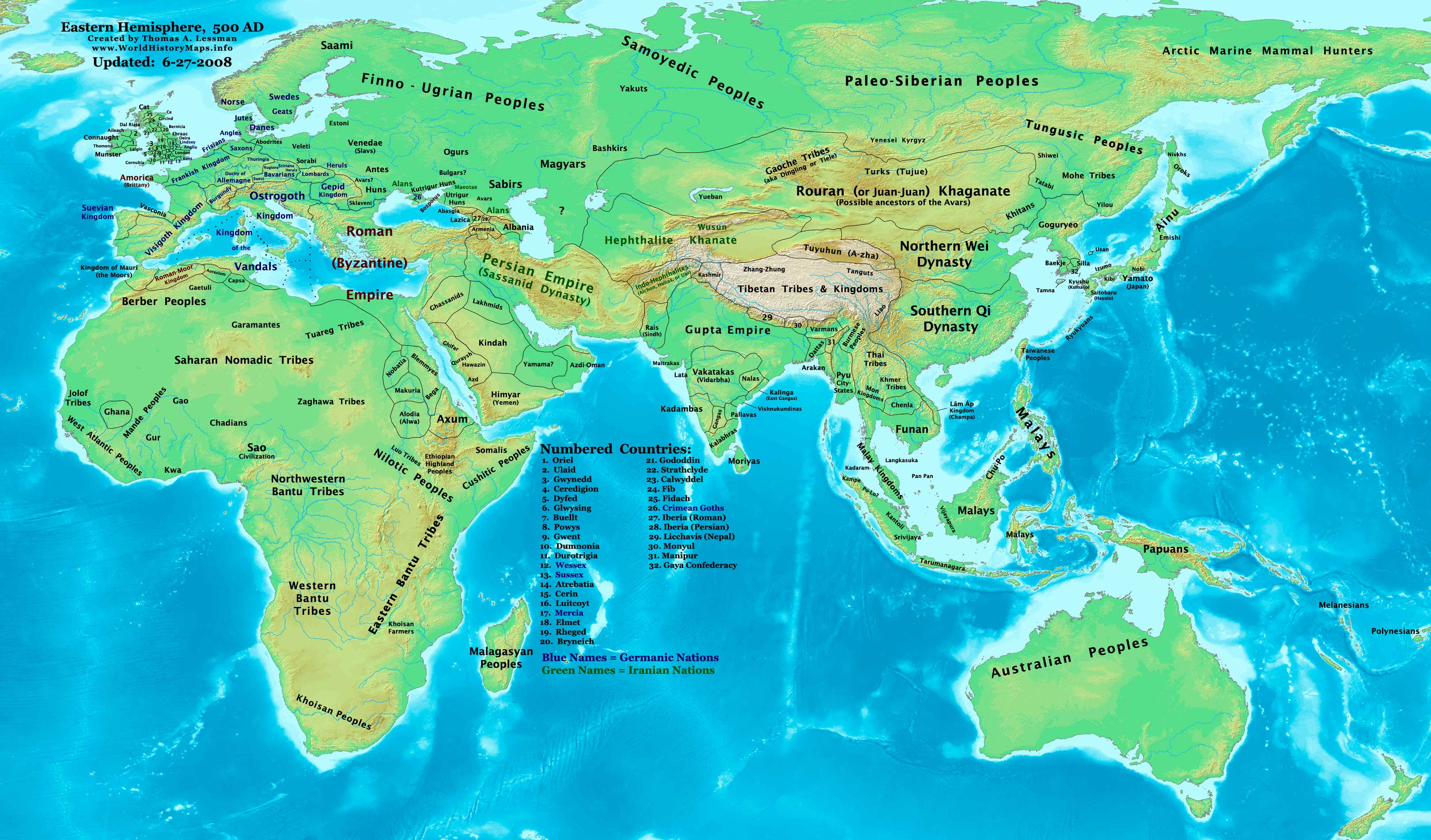
The Gupta Empire and main polities in Eurasia around 500 CE

There are varying definitions of this period. (Note: Different periods are designated as "classical Hinduism": Smart calls the period between 1000 BCE and 100 CE "pre-classical". It is the formative period for the Upanishads and Brahmanism (Note: Smart distinguishes "Brahmanism" from the Vedic religion, connecting "Brahmanism" with the Upanishads.) Jainism and Buddhism. For Smart, the "classical period" lasts from 100 to 1000 CE, and coincides with the flowering of "classical Hinduism" and the flowering and deterioration of Mahayana-buddhism in India.; For Michaels, the period between 500 BCE and 200 BCE is a time of "Ascetic reformism", whereas the period between 200 BCE and 1100 CE is the time of "classical Hinduism", since there is "a turning point between the Vedic religion and Hindu religions".; Muesse discerns a longer period of change, namely between 800 BCE and 200 BCE, which he calls the "Classical Period". According to Muesse, some of the fundamental concepts of Hinduism, namely karma, reincarnation and "personal enlightenment and transformation", which did not exist in the Vedic religion, developed in this time.)

- Gupta Empire (c. 320–579 CE)
- Later Gupta dynasty (c. 490–750 CE)
- Vakataka Empire (c. 250 – c. 510 CE)
- Pallava Empire (c. 275–901 CE)
- Kadamba dynasty (c. 345–1347 CE)
- Western Ganga dynasty (c. 350–1024 CE)
- Vishnukundina dynasty (c. 420–624 CE)
- Maitraka dynasty (c. 475 – c. 767 CE)
- Rai dynasty (c. 489–632 CE)

== Culture in ancient India ==
=== Art in ancient India ===
- Music in ancient India
  - Carnatic music
  - Hindustani music

=== Languages in ancient India ===
- Vedic Sanskrit
- Old Tamil
- Ancient scripts of the Indian subcontinent
  - Brahmi
  - Tamil-Brahmi
  - Pallava script
  - Gupta script
  - Kadamba script

=== Religion in ancient India ===
- History of Jainism
- History of Hinduism
  - Historical Vedic religion
    - Vedas
    - Vedic mythology
    - Vedic priesthood
- History of Buddhism

== Science and technology in ancient India ==
- Science and technology in ancient India
  - Indian mathematics
  - Indian astronomy
  - List of Indian inventions and discoveries
- Indian martial arts
  - Malla-yuddha
  - Kalaripayattu
- Indian medicine
  - Siddha medicine
  - Ayurveda
- Architecture
  - Dravidian architecture

== Organisations concerned with ancient India ==
=== Museums with ancient Indian exhibits ===
- India (clockwise)
  - National Museum, New Delhi
  - Patna Museum
  - Indian Museum, Kolkata
  - Government Museum, Bangalore
  - Goa State Museum
  - Kutch Museum, Bhuj, Gujarat
- United Kingdom
  - British Museum, London

== Notes ==
Subnotes

== Sources ==
- Flood, Gavin D. (1996), An Introduction to Hinduism, Cambridge University Press
- Khanna, Meenakshi (2007), Cultural History Of Medieval India, Berghahn Books
- Kulke, Hermann; Rothermund, Dietmar (2004), A History of India, Routledge
- Michaels, Axel (2004), Hinduism. Past and present, Princeton, New Jersey: Princeton University Press
- Misra, Amalendu (2004), Identity and Religion: Foundations of Anti-Islamism in India, SAGE
- Muesse, Mark William (2003), Great World Religions: Hinduism, archived from the original on 2013-12-27
- Muesse, Mark W. (2011), The Hindu Traditions: A Concise Introduction, Fortress Press
- Smart, Ninian (2003), Godsdiensten van de wereld (The World's religions), Kampen: Uitgeverij Kok
- Stein, Burton (2010), A History of India, John Wiley & Sons, ISBN 9781444323511
- Thapar, Romila (1978), Ancient Indian Social History: Some Interpretations (PDF), Orient Blackswan
