= Hours Alone =

2020 Mexican short film by Raúl Reynoso

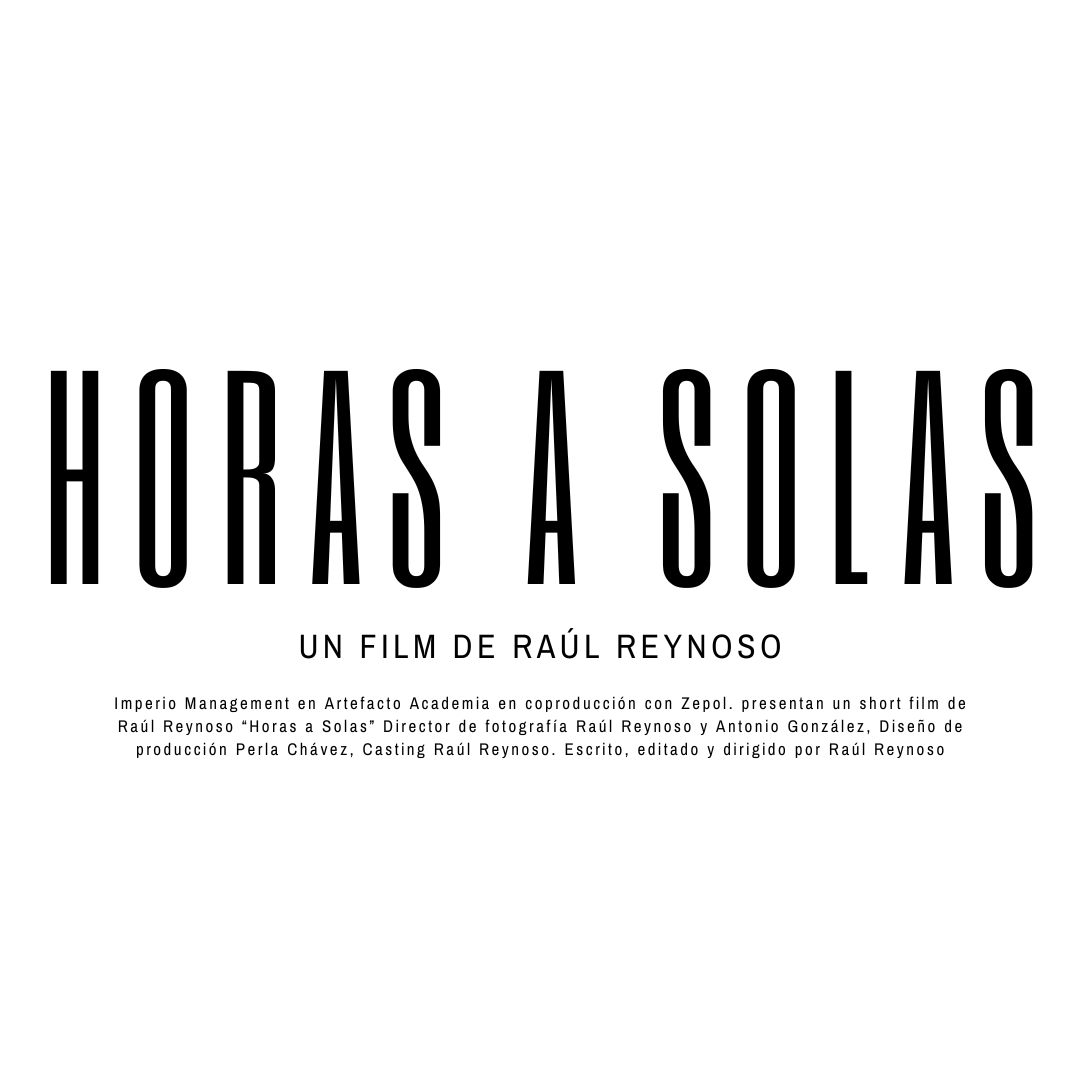
- Logo
- Directed by: Raúl Reynoso
- Starring: Roberto Moran Colunga
- Cinematography: Antonio González
- Release date: 2020 (Guadalajara International Film Festival)
- Country: Mexico
- Languages: Spanish; English

Hours Alone (known in Latin America as Horas a Solas and in Spain as Horas en Soledad is a 2020 Mexican psychological drama short film, written and directed by Raúl Reynoso.

The film tells the story of HIM, a man who decides to withdraw into himself following a series of traumatic events. During his time alone, he confronts his inner demons and repressed memories, while loneliness and nature push him to the brink of sanity. The narrative employs an intimate visual style, with a minimalist atmosphere that intensifies the protagonist's inner conflict. The lead role is played by Roberto Morán Colunga, who delivers a deeply emotional performance, accompanied by the narration of Alan Krishna.

'‘’Hours Alone'‘’ was filmed entirely on location in the state of Aguascalientes, Mexico, standing out for its rural landscapes and the symbolic use of light and sound to reinforce themes of isolation and emotional resilience. Reynoso's direction has been praised for its ability to capture complex emotions with subtlety and precision.

The short film had its official premiere at the Guadalajara International Film Festival in 2020, where it was well received by critics and audiences alike. It was also selected to compete at international festivals such as the Toronto Independent Film Festival.

== Synopsis ==
He has a void deep within him that he seeks to fill—loneliness, anger—and this feeling compels him to reflect. The film creates a raw portrayal of his inner state.

== Plot ==
The central conflict of Hours Alone revolves around a main character facing self-imposed or circumstantial isolation. This isolation leads him on an inner journey where he grapples with complex emotions such as fear, guilt, and regret. During this time alone, the character confronts memories and past decisions that have shaped his life, while searching for a way to reconcile with himself and the outside world.

The main character's journey explores not only physical loneliness but also emotional loneliness, highlighting the importance of introspection in finding meaning and redemption during times of disconnection. Ultimately, the short film reflects on how internal challenges can transform a person and open the door to a new beginning.

== Cast ==
- Roberto Morán Colunga as “El”
- Alan Krishna (Spanish voice)
- Aidan Shearer (UK voice)

== Accolades ==
| Award | Date | Category | Nominees | Result | Ref. |
|---|---|---|---|---|---|
| ABC Ibero-American Short Film Festival (FIBABC) | December 14, 2020 | Best Experimental Short Film | ‘'Horas a Solas’' | Won | |
| Accord Cine Fest | June 4, 2021 | Best Foreign Short Film - Special Mention | ‘'Horas a Solas’' | Won | |
| Falcon International Film Festival (FIFF) | June 17, 2021 | Best Experimental Short Film | ‘'Horas a Solas’' | Won | |
| International Symbolic Art Film Festival (ISAFF) | February 18, 2021 | Best Cinematography | Antonio González | Won | |
| International Symbolic Art Film Festival (ISAFF) | February 18, 2021 | Best Actor | Roberto Moran Colunga | Won | |
| International Symbolic Art Film Festival (ISAFF) | February 18, 2021 | Best Debut Director | Raúl Reynoso | Nominated | |
| Actor & Director Awards International Film Festival (ADIFF) | February 26, 2021 | Best Male Director (Short Film) | Raúl Reynoso | Won | |
| Actor & Director Awards International Film Festival (ADIFF) | February 26, 2021 | Best Actor | Roberto Moran Colunga | Won | |
| Actor & Director Awards International Film Festival (ADIFF) | February 26, 2021 | Best Short Film | Horas a Solas | Nominated | |
| GIMFA - Gralha International Monthly Film Awards | May 5, 2021 | Best Short Film Poster | Antonio González (Zepol) | Won | |
| GIMFA - Gralha International Monthly Film Awards | May 5, 2021 | Best Cinematography in a Short Film | Antonio González (Zepol) | Won | |
