= Anthony Gonzalez =

Anthony (or Tony) Gonzalez (or Gonzales) may refer to:

- Anthony Gonzalez (actor) (born 2004), American actor
- Anthony Gonzalez (politician) (born 1984), American politician from Ohio and former football wide receiver
- Anthony Gonzalez (musician) (born 1980), French musician and creator of M83
- Tony Gonzalez (born 1976), former American football tight end
- Tony González (baseball) (1936–2021), Major League Baseball outfielder
- Tony Gonzales (born 1980), American politician from Texas

== See also ==
- Antonio González (disambiguation)
- My Name Is Anthony Gonsalves (disambiguation)
- Mark Anthony Gonzalez (born 1994), Canadian soccer player
- Anthony Gonsalves (1927–2012), Indian composer
