= Parda Hai Parda (song) =

"Parda Hai parda"

Song by Mohammed Rafi & Amit Kumar

from the album Amar Akbar Anthony
- Released: 1977
- Recorded: Mumbai, 1977
- Genre: Film score, filmi qawwali
- Songwriter: Anand Bakshi
- Composer: Laxmikant–Pyarelal

"Parda Hai Parda" (Hindi: पर्दा है पर्दा, Urdu: پردہ ہے پردہ, lit. "There is a veil") is a filmi qawwali song from the 1977 Hindi film, Amar Akbar Anthony, performed by playback singers Mohammed Rafi and Amit Kumar, with the lyrics penned by Anand Bakshi; the film's musical directors were the duo Laxmikant-Pyarelal. A comical commentary on how women's beautiful faces are hidden by their veils, the song appears in the film as a sequence where Rishi Kapoor's character, Akbar Illahabadi, performs in a qawwali show to impress his love interest, Dr. Salma (played by Neetu Singh). When Dr. Salma attempts to open her veil, her father, Tayyab Ali (played by Mukri), tries to stop her but fails. The sequence also features the character Anthony Gonsalves (Amitabh Bachchan) and an old woman Bharati (Nirupa Roy), who are revealed to be Akbar's older brother and mother, respectively, later in the film.

Rafi sang for Kapoor, while Kumar sang one line for Bachchan. Kumar's vocals were uncredited.

Parda Hai Parda gained much popularity with South Asian audiences and ranked second in the Binaca Geetmala year-end chart for 1977.

Laxmikant-Pyarelal were awarded the Filmfare Best Music Director Award for 1977 on the strength of Amar Akbar Anthony's soundtrack, particularly this song.

Rafi was nominated for the Filmfare Award for Best Male Playback Singer that year for this song. The award that year was won by Rafi himself, but for another song, "Kya Hua Tera Wada" from the film Hum Kisise Kum Nahin (also starring Kapoor); the latter song also won Rafi his only National Film Award for Best Male Playback Singer.

== See also ==
- My Name Is Anthony Gonsalves (song)
