= Filmi qawwali =

Music genre

Filmi qawwali (Urdu: فلمی قوٌالی. Bengali: ফিল্মি কাওয়ালি, Hindi: फ़िल्मी क़व्वाली) is a form of qawwali music found in the Lollywood, Dhallywood, Tollywood, and Bollywood film industries.

It represents a distinct subgenre of film music, although it usually bears little resemblance to traditional qawwali, which is the devotional music of the Sufis. One example of filmi qawwali is the song Pardah Hai Pardah sung by Mohammed Rafi, and composed by Laxmikant–Pyarelal in Indian film Amar Akbar Anthony (1977). Another example of filmi qawwali is the song "Qurbani Qurbani Qurbani" rendered by Kishore Kumar, Anwar and Aziz Nazan and composed by Kalyanji-Anandji for the Indian film Qurbani(1980).

Within the subgenre of filmi qawwali, there exists a form of qawwali that is infused with modern and Western instruments, usually with techno beats, called techno-qawwali. An example of techno-qawwali is Kajra Re, a filmi song composed by Shankar–Ehsaan–Loy. A newer variation of the techno-qawwali based on the more dance oriented tracks is known as the "club qawwali". More tracks of this nature are being recorded and released.

Nusrat Fateh Ali Khan and A.R. Rahman have composed filmi qawwalis in the style of traditional qawwali. Examples include Arziyan (Delhi 6), Khwaja Mere Khwaja (Jodhaa Akbar) and Kun Faya Kun (Rockstar).

Examples in the Bengali Tollywood cinema include the song Remix Qawwali (Bindaas) sung by Neha Kakkar and Nakash Aziz. In addition to this, the Bengali Dhallywood cinema also includes qawwalis such as the song Tikatuli (Dhaka Attack) sung by Motin Chowdhury.

== Notable artists ==
=== Nusrat Fateh Ali Khan ===
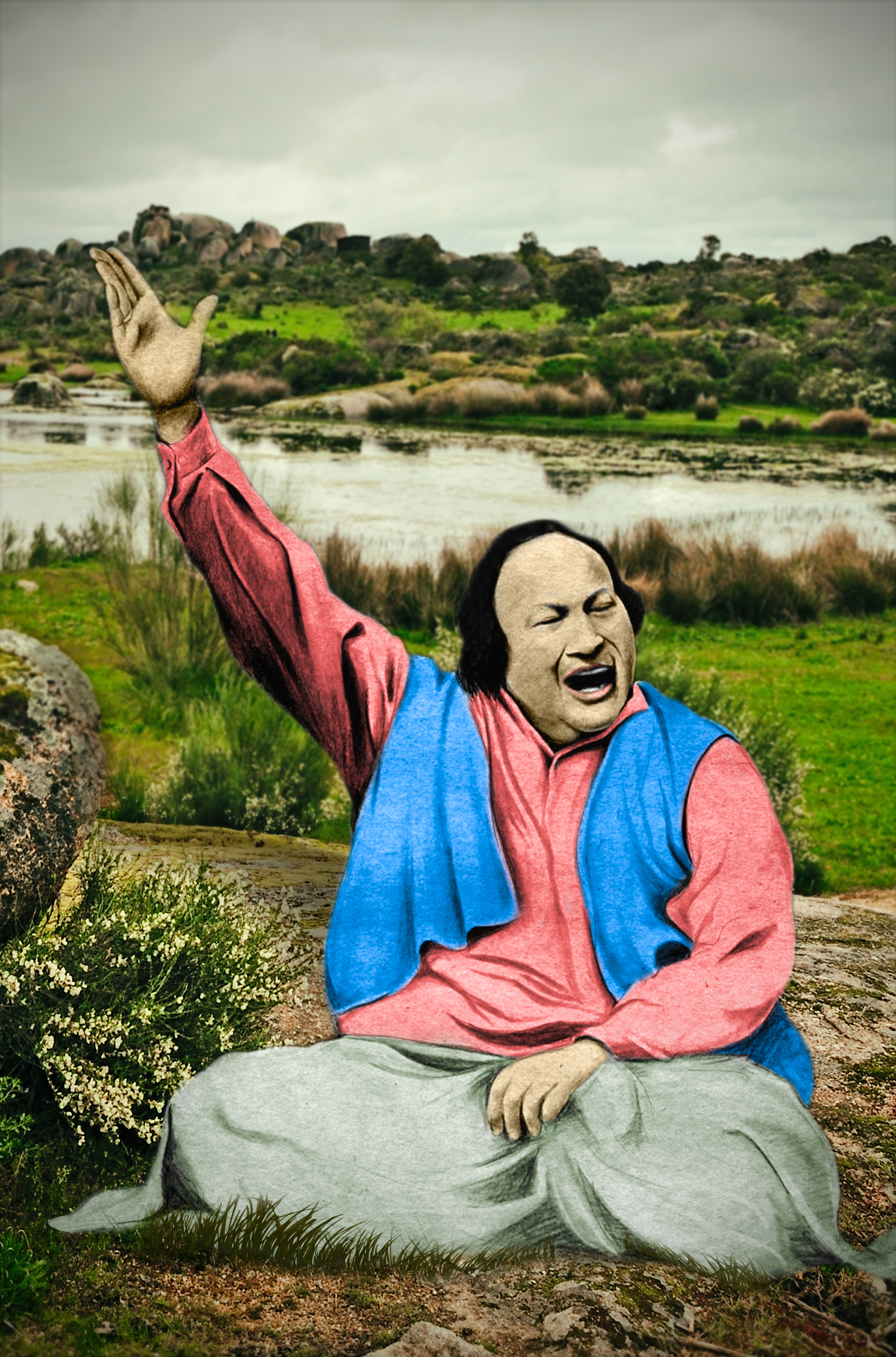
This photo is dedicated to Ustad Nusrat Fateh Ali Khan. It's made by Bhushan Kuma Atter (Attersaab)

One of Nusrat Fateh Ali Khan's famous Qawwali songs, "Tere Bin Nahin Lagda" ("I am restless without you"), appeared on two of his 1996 albums, Sorrows Vol. 69 and Sangam (as "Tere Bin Nahin Lagda Dil"), the latter a collaborative album with Indian lyricist Javed Akhtar. Lata Mangeshkar recorded a cover version called "Tere Bin Nahin Jeena" for Kachche Dhaage Composed by Nusrat Fateh Ali Khan, the Kachche Dhaage soundtrack album sold 3 million units in India. British-Indian producer Bally Sagoo released a remix of "Tere Bin Nahin Lagda", which was later featured in the 2002 British film Bend It Like Beckham, starring Parminder Nagra and Keira Knightley. A cover version called "Tere Bin" was recorded by Rahat Fateh Ali Khan with Asees Kaur for the 2018 Bollywood film Simmba

Nusrat Fateh Ali Khan's music had a big impact on Bollywood music, inspiring numerous Indian musicians working in Bollywood, especially during the 1990s. For example, he inspired A. R. Rahman and Javed Akhtar, both of whom he collaborated with. However, there were many instances of Indian music directors plagiarising Khan's music to produce hit filmi songs. Viju Shah's hit song "Tu Cheez Badi Hai Mast Mast" in Mohra (1994) was plagiarised from Khan's popular Qawwali song "Dam Mast Qalandar".

== See also ==
- Hindi film music
- Filmi
- Filmi-ghazal
- Music of Bangladesh
- Music of India
- Music of Pakistan
