= Ancient scripts of the Indian subcontinent =

Ancient Indian scripts

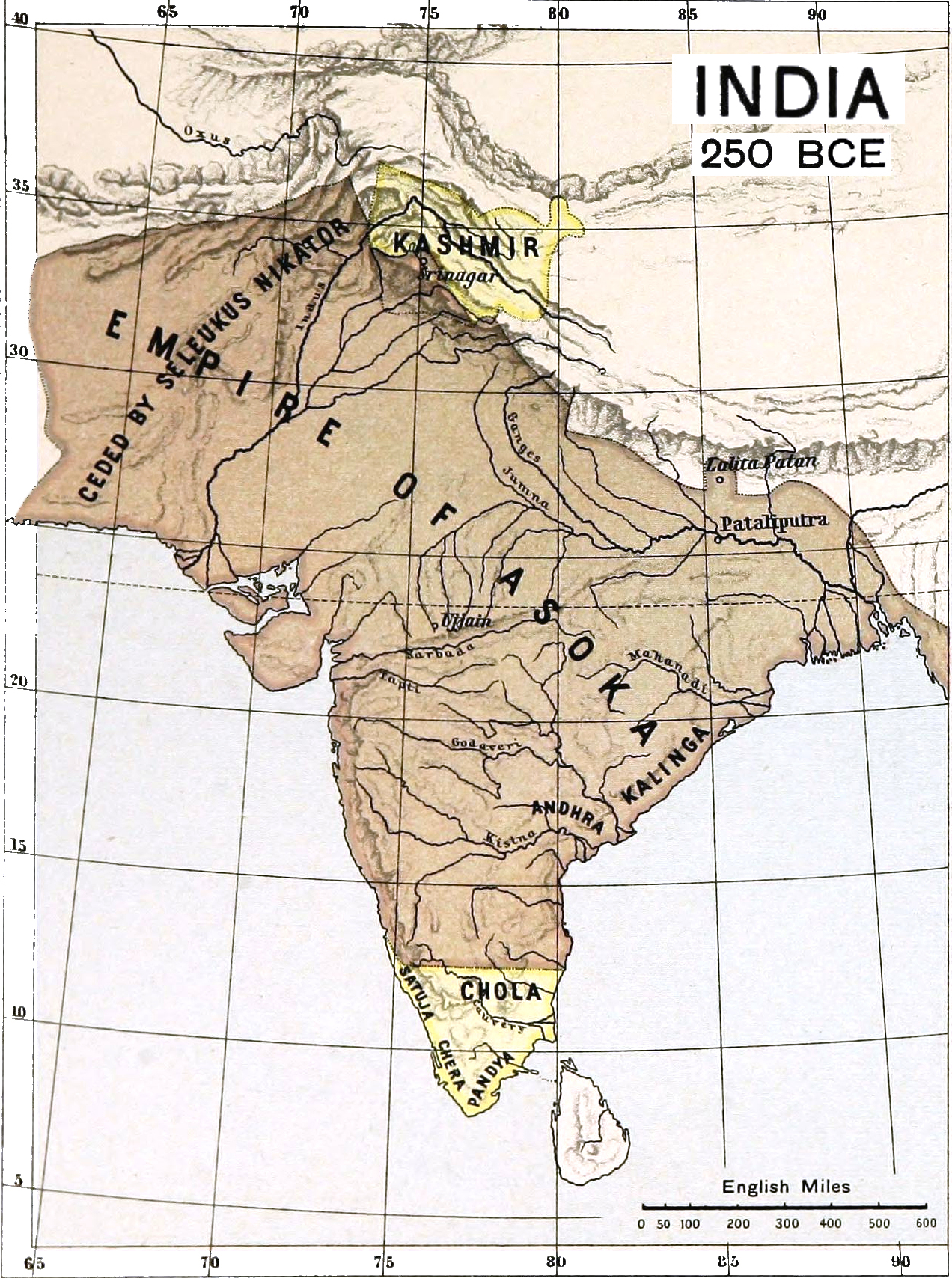
India in 250BC

Ancient Indian scripts have been used in the history of the Indian subcontinent as writing systems. The Indian subcontinent consists of various separate linguistic communities, each of which share a common language and culture. The people of the ancient India wrote in many scripts which largely have common roots.

== Indus script ==
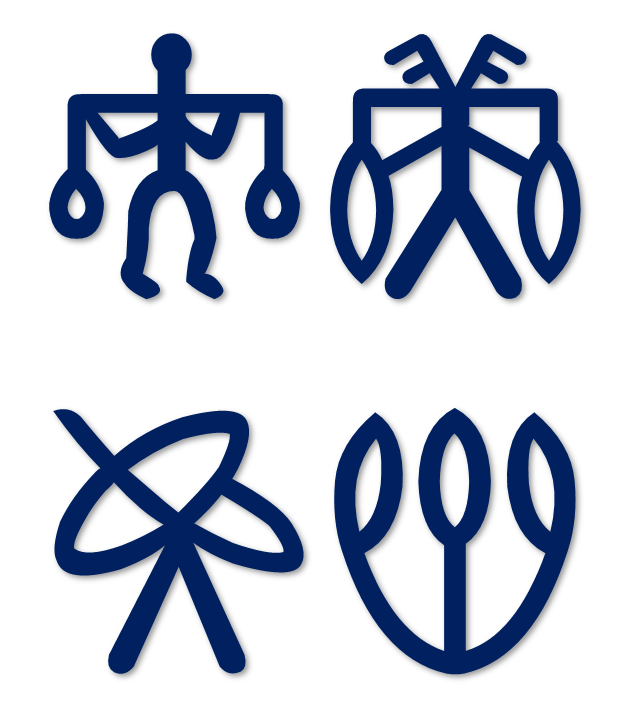
Indus script font

The Indus script (also known as the Harappan script) is a corpus of symbols produced by the Indus Valley Civilization, in Harrapa and Kot Diji. Most inscriptions containing these symbols are extremely short, making it difficult to judge whether or not these symbols constituted a script used to record a language, or even symbolise a writing system. In spite of many attempts, the 'script' has not yet been deciphered, but efforts are ongoing. It was used during time period of 2700–1900 BCE

== Gupta script ==
The Gupta script (sometimes referred to as Gupta Brahmi script or Late Brahmi script) was used for writing Sanskrit and is associated with the Gupta Empire of India, which was a period of material prosperity and great religious and scientific developments. The Gupta script was descended from Brāhmī and gave rise to the Nāgarī, Śāradā and Siddhaṃ scripts. These scripts in turn gave rise to many of the most important scripts of India, including Devanāgarī (the most common script used for writing Sanskrit since the 19th century), the Gurmukhī script for Punjabi, the Bengali-Assamese script and the Tibetan script.

== Siddhaṃ script ==
Siddhaṃ (also Siddhāṃ), also known in its later evolved form as Siddhamātṛkā, is a medieval Brahmic abugida, derived from the Gupta script and ancestral to the Nāgarī, Assamese, Bengali, Tirhuta, Odia and Nepalese scripts.

== Tibetan script ==
The Tibetan script is a segmental writing system (abugida) of Indic origin used to write certain Tibetic languages, including Tibetan, Dzongkha, Sikkimese, Ladakhi, Jirel and sometimes Balti. It has also been used for some non-Tibetic languages in close cultural contact with Tibet, such as Thakali. The printed form is called uchen script while the hand-written cursive forms used in everyday writing are called umê script.

The script is closely linked to a broad ethnic Tibetan identity, spanning across areas in India, Nepal, Bhutan and Tibet. The Tibetan script is of Brahmic origin from the Gupta script and is ancestral to scripts such as Meitei, Lepcha, Marchen and the multilingual ʼPhags-pa script.

== Kharosthi script ==
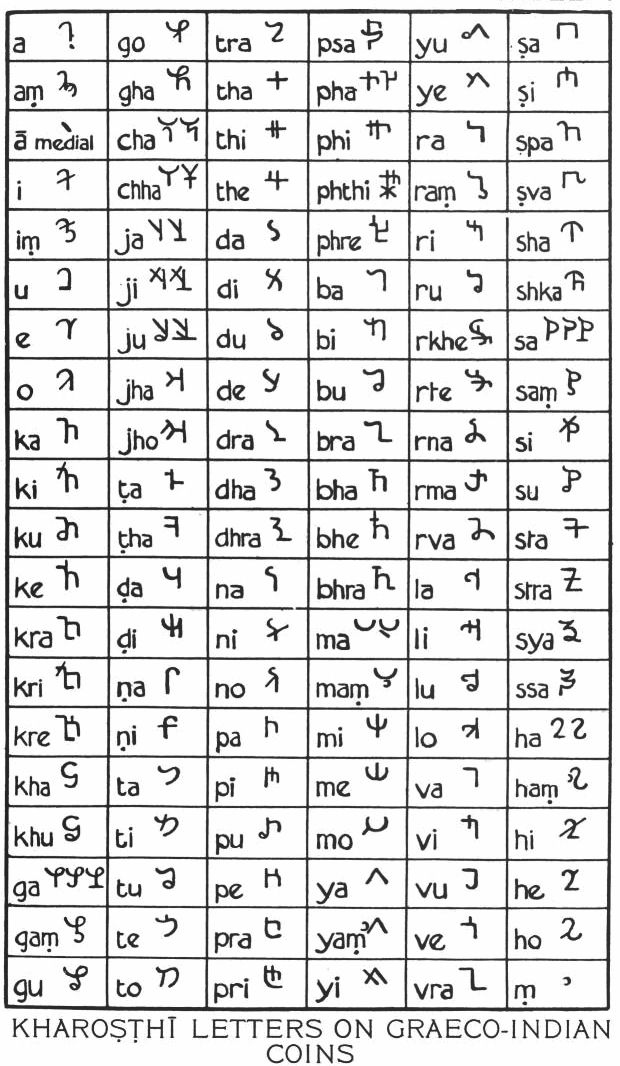
Kharosthi letters

The Kharosthi script, also spelled Kharoshthi or Kharoṣṭhī (Kharosthi: 𐨑𐨪𐨆𐨯𐨠𐨁) was an ancient script used in Gandhara to write Gandhari Prakrit and Sanskrit. It was used in Central Asia too. An abugida, it was introduced at least by the middle of the 3rd century BCE, possibly during the 4th century BCE, and remained in use until it died out in its homeland around the 3rd century CE.

It was also in use in Bactria, the Kushan Empire, Sogdia, and along the Silk Road. There is some evidence it may have survived until the 7th century in Khotan and Niya, both cities in Xinjiang.

== Sharada script ==
The Śāradā, Sarada or Sharada script is an abugida writing system of the Brahmic family of scripts. The script was widespread between the 8th and 12th centuries in the northwestern parts of Indian Subcontinent (in Kashmir and northern KPK), for writing Sanskrit and Kashmiri. Originally more widespread, its use became later restricted to Kashmir, and it is now rarely used except by the Kashmiri Pandit community for religious purposes.

Word Sharada in Sharada script

== Landa script ==
Laṇḍā script evolved from the Śāradā during the 10th century. It was widely used in Punjab, Sindh, Kashmir and some parts of Balochistan and Khyber Pakhtunkhwa. It was used to write Punjabi, Hindavi, Sindhi, Balochi, Kashmiri, Pashto, and various Punjabi dialects like Pahari-Pothwari.

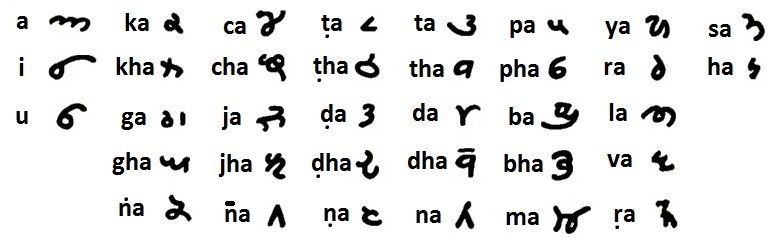
Landa script

=== Sub-scripts of landa script ===
Landa script gave rise to many important descendant writing systems like;

=== Multani script ===
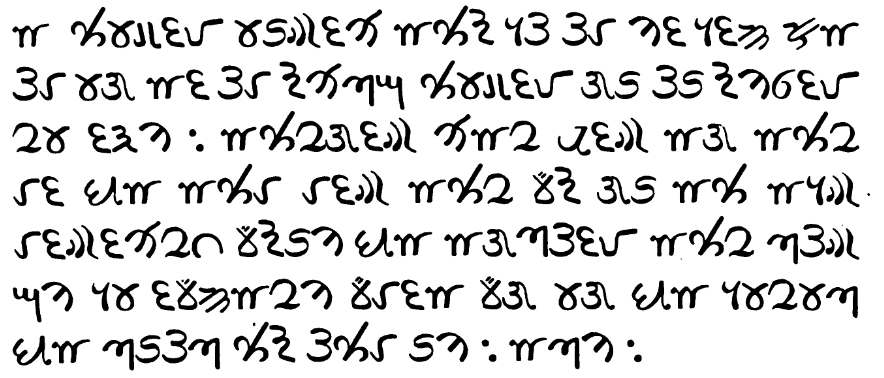
Multani script

Multani is a Brahmic script originating in the Multan region of Punjab. It was used to write Saraiki, a dialect of Punjabi language. The script was used for routine writing and commercial activities. Multani is one of four Landa scripts whose usage was extended beyond the mercantile domain and formalized for literary activity and printing; the others being Gurmukhi, Khojki, and Khudawadi.

=== Mahajani script ===
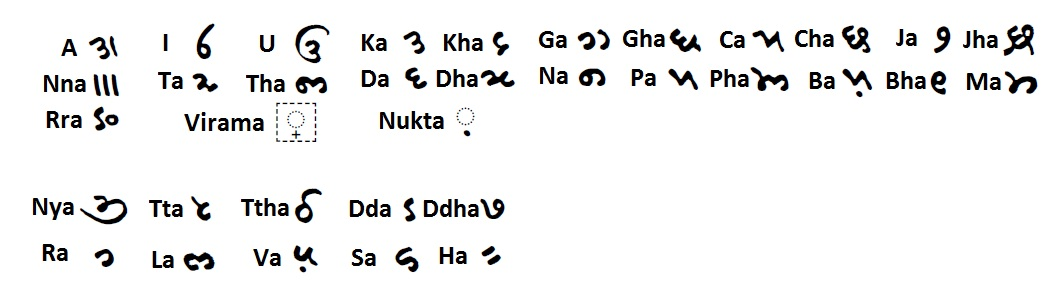
Mahajani script

Mahajani is a Laṇḍā mercantile script that was historically for writing accounts and financial records in Marwari, Hindi and Punjabi. It is a Brahmic script and is written left-to-right. Mahajani refers to the Punjabi word for 'bankers', also known as 'sarrafi' or 'kothival' (merchant).

=== Khojki script ===
Khojki, or Khojiki ( Sindhi: خوجڪي (Arabic script) खोजकी (Devanagari)), is a script used formerly and almost exclusively by the Khoja community of parts Sindh. The name "Khojki" is derived from the Persian word khoje, which means "master", or "lord". It was employed primarily to record Isma'ili religious literature as well as literature for a few secret Twelver sects. It is one of the two Landa scripts used for liturgy, the other being the Gurmukhī alphabet

=== Khudabadi script ===
Khudabadi script

Khudabadi (𑊻𑋩𑋣𑋏𑋠𑋔𑋠𑋏𑋢) is a script generally used by some Sindhis to write the Sindhi language. It is also known as Hathvanki (or Warangi) script. Khudabadi is one of the four scripts used for writing the Sindhi language, the others being Perso-Arabic, Khojki and Devanagari script.

== Other scripts ==
Other important scripts that have been used for writing purposes include;

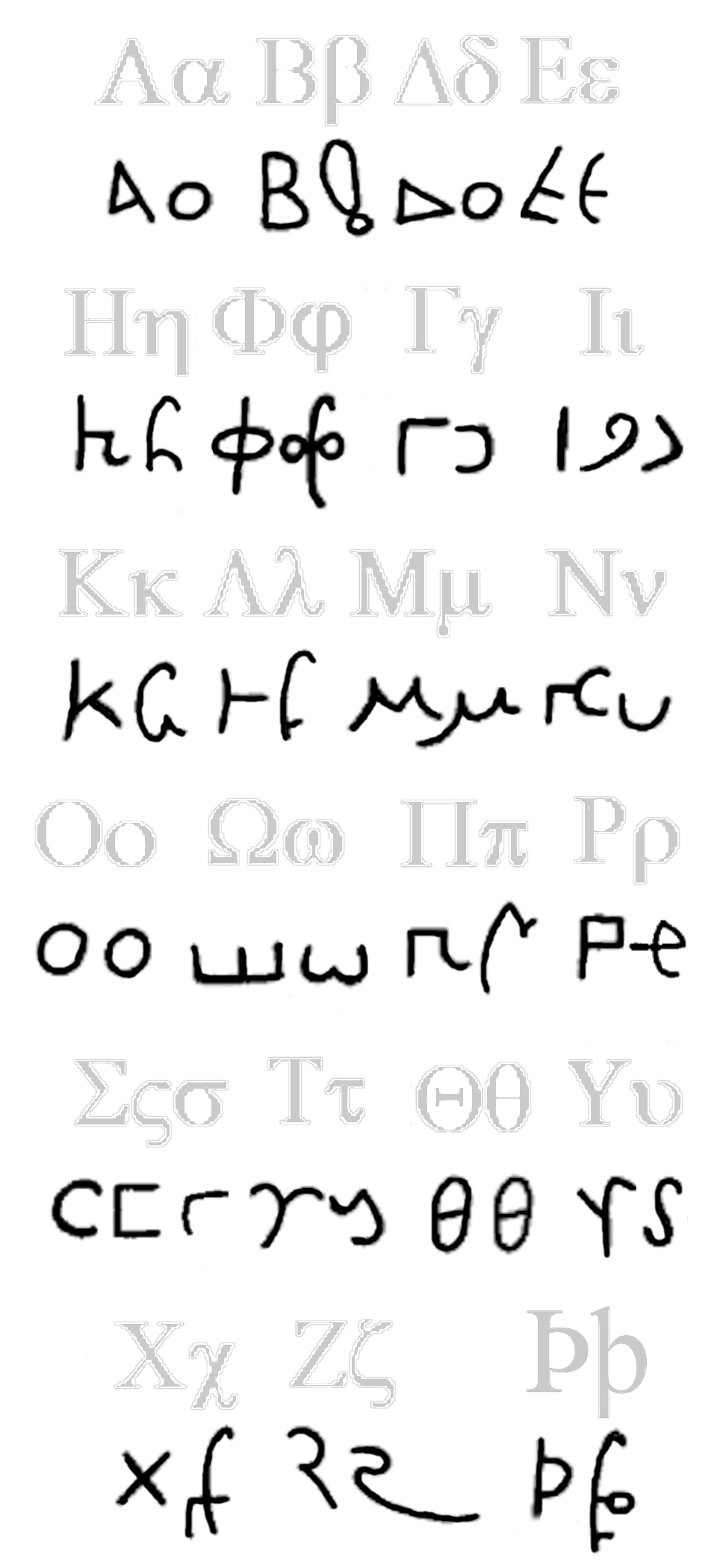
Bactrian script

=== Bactrian script ===
Bactrian (Αριαο, Aryao, [arjaː]) is an extinct language formerly spoken in the region of Bactria and was used as the official language of the Indo-Greek kingdom, Kushan, and the Hephthalite empires.

=== Brahmi script ===
Brahmi (/ˈbrɑːmi/; ISO 15919: Brāhmī ) is the modern name for a writing system of ancient South Asia. It latter gave rise of Sharada, Landa and other scripts.

=== Pahlavi script ===
During rule of Persian empires in parts of Balochistan, various Pahlavi scripts may have been used there as a writing system.

Pahlavi script
