= Asian Music =

Asian Music may refer to:

- Music of Asia
- Asian Music (record label), a Nepalese music company
- Asian Music Circuit, UK organisation promoting Asian music
- Asian Music Circle, UK organisation promoting Indian music, founded by Patricia Angadi (who introduced the Beatles to Ravi Shankar)
- Asian Music Chart, of the UK-based Official Charts Company
- Society for Asian Music, an ethnomusicologist society for Asian music
  - Asian Music (journal), its academic journal

== See also ==
- Oriental music (disambiguation)
