= Amar Akbar Anthony =

1977 Indian film directed by Manmohan Desai

- Theatrical release poster
- Directed by: Manmohan Desai
- Written by: Kader Khan (dialogue); K. K. Shukla (scenario)
- Screenplay by: Prayag Raj Sharma
- Story by: Jeevanprabha M. Desai; Pushpa Sharma (story idea)
- Produced by: Manmohan Desai
- Starring: Vinod Khanna; Rishi Kapoor; Amitabh Bachchan; Neetu Singh; Parveen Babi; Shabana Azmi; Nirupa Roy; Pran
- Cinematography: Peter Pereira
- Edited by: Kamlakar Karkhanis
- Music by: Laxmikant–Pyarelal; Anand Bakshi (lyrics)
- Distributed by: Hirawat Jain & Co.
- Release date: 27 May 1977
- Running time: 184 minutes
- Country: India
- Languages: Hindi; Urdu
- Box office: est. ₹155 million (equivalent to ₹4.3 billion or US$45 million in 2023)

Amar Akbar Anthony is a 1977 Indian Hindi-language masala film directed and produced by Manmohan Desai and written by Kader Khan. Released in India on 27 May 1977, the film stars an ensemble cast of Vinod Khanna, Rishi Kapoor, Amitabh Bachchan, Neetu Singh, Parveen Babi, Shabana Azmi, Nirupa Roy and Pran. The plot focuses on three brothers separated in childhood who are adopted by families of different faiths; Hinduism, Islam and Christianity. They grow up to be a police officer, a qawwali singer and the owner of a country bar, respectively. The soundtrack album was composed by Laxmikant-Pyarelal and the lyrics were written by Anand Bakshi. The film earned ₹155 million (US$17.69 million) at the Indian box office, becoming the highest-grossing Indian film of that year, alongside Dharam Veer and Hum Kisise Kum Naheen.

Religious tolerance became a landmark theme in Bollywood masala films, building on the masala formula pioneered a few years earlier by Nasir Hussain's Yaadon Ki Baaraat (1973). Amar Akbar Anthony also had a lasting impact on pop culture with its catchy songs, quotable one-liners, and the character of Anthony Gonsalves (played by Bachchan). It won several awards at the 25th Filmfare Awards, including Best Actor, Best Music Director and Best Editing. It was later remade in Tamil as Shankar Salim Simon (1978), in Telugu as Ram Robert Rahim (1980), and in Malayalam as John Jaffer Janardhanan (1982). In Pakistan, the film was unofficially remade in Punjabi as Akbar Amar Anthony (1978).

== Plot ==
Kishanlal, a chauffeur, is released from prison on 15 August 1955, after serving a sentence for the fatal hit-and-run accident committed by his employer, crime lord Robert.

Despite Robert's promises, Kishanlal returns home to find his wife Bharati suffering from tuberculosis and their three sons starving. Enraged, Kishanlal confronts Robert to beg for his assistance, only to be humiliated, abused and disowned. Turning the tables on Robert's henchmen, Kishanlal escapes in a car loaded with smuggled gold bullion, pursued by Robert's goons. Arriving home, Kishanlal finds Bharati gone; her suicide note explains her shame and despair. Taking his sons with him, he eludes pursuit to place the boys at the foot of Mahatma Gandhi's statue in Borivali National Park, leaving the eldest in charge. He drives off to mislead Robert's goons, but after a fiery car crash both the police and Robert's people believe Kishanlal and his sons are dead.

The three children become separated. Amar, the eldest, runs after his father, is knocked down by Robert's goons and adopted by Police Superintendent Khanna (a Hindu by faith). Middle son Anthony goes in search of food for his crying baby brother; left alone, Raju is found and adopted by kindly Muslim tailor Darji Ilahabadi. Returning to find no one, Anthony shelters from a storm outside a nearby Catholic church, falling asleep from exhaustion. The parish priest, Father Gonsalves, discovers him and Bharati's suicide note and adopts him. Each will be reared in the religions of their adoptive fathers: Hindu, Islam and Christianity.

Elsewhere: Bharati is caught in the storm and struck blind by a falling branch - divine punishment for leaving her sons. She is rescued and dropped off home by Mr. Ilahabadi, but cannot see Raju beside him; at home she is told her family is dead. Kishanlal escapes the car crash and finds Robert's gold; returning to the empty park a rich man – he is devastated to be alone.

Twenty-two years pass. Bharati, now a flower seller, is the victim of a hit-and-run accident outside a church and is rushed to a private hospital by Anthony, the Liquor license of the neighborhood. Raju, now called Akbar and a popular Qawwali singer, is at the hospital to romance Dr. Salma Ali because her grumpy father Taiyyab Ali disapproves of him. Amar is the police inspector who arrives to check on the accident case. All three men donate blood to save Bharati's life, unaware they are related. Later, Amar tracks down highway robbers and meets Lakshmi, forced by her abusive criminal stepmother and stepbrother Ranjeet to act as bait to protect her elderly, wheelchair-using grandmother. Together they take evidence and arrest the stepmother, and Amar gives sanctuary to Lakshmi and her grandmother in his home.

With Robert's gold Kishanlal became a wealthy crime lord in his own right. Kidnapping Robert's infant daughter Jenny in revenge for his lost family, he reared her as his 'niece' and sent her to school abroad. He also destroyed Robert's organization, forcing a grovelling Robert to work for him while begging for his daughter's return. In the middle of a smuggling operation Kishanlal's gang are raided by police: in the chaos Robert takes a crate of Kishanlal's smuggled gold and shoots Superintendent Khanna (Amar's 'father'), badly wounding him. With the gold Robert reinstates himself as a crime lord and plans to get Jenny back and kill Kishanlal, hiring Ranjeet in the process.

Jenny returns from abroad and Anthony falls head over heels in love with her during Easter Sunday services. Bharati, taken hostage by Robert, suffers a minor head injury while escaping; miraculously, her sight is restored at a festival hosted by Akbar in honor of Sai Baba of Shirdi. Further, she identifies Akbar as Raju from a childhood photograph with Mr. Ilahabadi, while he recognizes her as the blind woman he drove home that fateful night.

Akbar rescues Salma and Taiyyab Ali from a house fire set by Taiyyab's blackmailing former mistress. A grateful Taiyyab gives permission for Akbar and Salma's marriage, leading to Akbar and Amar discovering they are brothers, Kishanlal and Bharati their parents.

Events take a drastic turn when Kishanlal is double-crossed by Jenny's bodyguard Zebisco, who takes her to Robert in exchange for her hand in marriage. Father Gonsalves and Lakshmi see her abducted, but Lakshmi is also taken by Ranjeet and Robert murders Father Gonsalves – planting Kishanlal's Kali talisman as a 'clue.' Through Father Gonsalves' death Anthony discovers that Kishanlal and Bharati are his parents and Amar and Akbar his brothers.

The brothers take action to infiltrate Robert's mansion. Akbar, made suspicious when strangers try to collect Jenny's wedding dress, disguises himself as an elderly dithering tailor who goes with them to make last minute alterations. He sends a letter to his adopted father which Salma reads, and she joins him as his 'assistant/wife' to help the girls escape. Amar and Anthony waylay and impersonate the one-man band and Catholic priest on their way to Robert's to marry Jenny and Zebisco. Rejoicing in their reunion, the brothers celebrate as they go after Robert, Zebisco, Ranjeet and the remaining goons.

Happy that he is alive, Bharati is distraught to learn Kishanlal will go to prison for his crimes, but he reassures her: their reunited family is the only thing that matters to him. Superintendent Khanna, recovered from Robert's attack, briefly releases Kishanlal so that he may embrace his sons. The film ends with the brothers and their sweethearts joyfully driving into the sunset.

== Cast ==
- Vinod Khanna as Amar Khanna, the eldest son
- Amitabh Bachchan as Anthony Gonsalves, the middle son
- Rishi Kapoor as Akbar Ilahabadi, the youngest son
- Parveen Babi as Jenny
- Shabana Azmi as Lakshmi
- Neetu Singh as Dr. Salma Ali
- Nirupa Roy as Bharati (Amar, Akbar and Anthony's mother)
- Pran as Kishanlal (Amar, Akbar and Anthony's father)
- Jeevan as twins Robert and Albert
  - Tom Alter as the voice of Albert
- Yusuf Khan as Zebisko (Jenny's bodyguard), credited as Yusuf
- Mukri as Taiyyab Ali (Salma's father)
- Nazir Hussain as Father Gonsalves (Anthony's adoptive father)
- Kamal Kapoor as Superintendent Khanna (Amar's adoptive father)
- Hercules as Raghu
- Shivraj as Mr. Ilahabadi (Akbar's adoptive father)
- Protima Devi as Lakshmi's grandmother
- Moolchand as Pedro (Robert's friend)
- Master Bittu as Young Amar
- Master Ravi as Young Anthony
- Baby Sabina as Young Jenny
- Master Tito as Young Akbar
- Helen as Fake Jenny (special appearance)
- Nadira as Lakshmi's stepmother (special appearance)
- Madhumati as Bijli (special appearance)
- Ranjeet as Ranjeet, Lakshmi's stepbrother (special appearance)

== Production ==
"You see the whole country of the system is juxtapositioned by the hemoglobin in the atmosphere, because you are a sophisticated rhetorician intoxicated with the exuberance of your own verbosity."

— Anthony Gonsalves, in his monologue preceding the "My Name Is Anthony Gonsalves" sequence

Amar Akbar Anthony has a cinematic antecedent in Yash Chopra's 1965 film Waqt, in which a father's three sons are separated from each other. Waqt also inspired the 1976 super-hit diamond jubilee Pakistani film Talash, starring Shabnam and Nadeem. However, Amar Akbar Anthony was slated to release in 1975, prior to Talash's release.

Prayag Raj wrote the film's screenplay, while Kader Khan wrote the dialogue.

The character of Anthony Gonsalves was named after the famous composer and teacher of the same name, whose pupils included Pyarelal (of Laxmikant–Pyarelal, the composer duo of the film) and R. D. Burman. Director Manmohan Desai had planned for Amitabh's character to be named “Anthony Fernandes,” with Bakshi's song entitled “My Name is Anthony Fernandes.” However, the song didn't go well with Laxmikant-Pyarelal. Composer Pyarelal then recalled his famous violin teacher and suggested that the character's last name be changed to “Gonsalves.” The nonsensical monologue preceding the "My Name Is Anthony Gonsalves" sequence was taken in part from an 1878 speech by British politician Benjamin Disraeli in reference to W. E. Gladstone.

=== Filming ===
Amar Akbar Anthony was Manmohan Desai's first film as an independent film producer. The film was shot over a month at Ranjit Studios in Mumbai. Some exterior and interior shots were filmed at the Mount Mary Church in Bandra, Mumbai and at the Don Bosco School, Wadala, Mumbai respectively. Shooting was scheduled so that the entire cast didn't have to appear together except for the climactic sequence and the title song ("Anhoni Ko Honi"), where they all perform as a group. However, the shooting went over schedule, which required Rishi Kapoor and Shabana Azmi to shoot their scenes separately so they could leave towards the end of production to work on other films.

== Analysis ==
Amar Akbar Anthony incorporates a strong element of secularism within a Bollywood masala film. Analysts such as Virdi (2003) and Kavoori & Punathambekar (2008) note that the themes of Desai's "magnum opus" include religious pluralism and secular nationalism. Philip Lutgendorf hints that the separation of the three children on Indian Independence Day is akin to the Partition of India. Similarly, Vijay Mishra (2013) argues that the film reaffirmed India's "liberal ethos." The three religions represented by the titular characters are the "pillars of the nation:" when they work together, they can restore life to their mother (represented when they donate blood during the opening title sequence) and beat any evil (symbolised by their common villain). The characters' reunion with their parents completes the nationalistic allegory, suggesting that what was lost at independence can be regained.

The film's masala style is evident in its plot and characters. According to Varia (2013), Amar Akbar Anthony was conceived as a tragedy but later incorporated many other genres. Dickson (2016) commented that the film featured a plot that was so complex that it would "give even Shakespeare migraines." Some authors also highlight the archetypal character of the suffering and self-sacrificing mother (Roy). However, Dinesh Raheja concludes that "ultimately, the show belongs to Amitabh Bachchan. In a tailor-made role, he has the audience in stitches. Despite his playing an implausible character, one quickly surrenders one's reservations in favour of a rollicking romp."

== Music ==
Amar Akbar Anthony

Soundtrack album by Laxmikant-Pyarelal
- Released: 7 January 1977
- Genre: Feature Film Soundtrack
- Label: Universal Music India
- Producer: Manmohan Desai

Amar Akbar Anthony's soundtrack was composed by Laxmikant-Pyarelal, with lyrics penned by Anand Bakshi. It proved as popular and successful as the film itself. The vinyl record, released on Polydor, was the first LP that was coloured pink.

Some of the biggest names in the Indian music industry of the time provided vocals for the songs:

- Kishore Kumar for Amitabh Bachchan
- Mukesh and Mahendra Kapoor for Vinod Khanna
- Mohammed Rafi and Shailendra Singh for Rishi Kapoor
- Lata Mangeshkar for Parveen Babi, Neetu Singh, and Shabana Azmi

The song "Humko Tumse Ho Gaya Hai Pyar" is notable for bringing Mukesh, Kumar, Rafi and Mangeshkar together for the first and only occasion in their careers. The film also features a comical filmi qawwali entitled "Parda Hai Parda" sung by Rafi, with a single line (for Bachchan) supplied by an uncredited Amit Kumar (Kishore Kumar's son).

Original tracklist
No.	Title	Singer(s)	Length
1.	"My Name Is Anthony Gonsalves"	Kishore Kumar, Amitabh Bachchan, uncredited female voice	5:32
2.	"Amar Akbar Anthony"	Kishore Kumar, Mahendra Kapoor, Shailendra Singh	5:52
3.	"Humko Tumse Ho Gaya Hai Pyar"	Kishore Kumar, Mohammed Rafi, Mukesh, Lata Mangeshkar	7:33
4.	"Taiyabali Pyar Ka Dushman"	Mohammed Rafi	4:40
5.	"Parda Hai Parda (Raga Darbari)"	Mohammed Rafi, Amit Kumar	7:59
6.	"Shirdi Wale Sai Baba (Raga Bilawal)"	Mohammed Rafi	5:52
7.	"Ye Sach Hai Koi Kahani Nahin"	Mohammed Rafi	2:22

== Release ==
The Emergency Period delayed the release of several of Manmohan Desai's films. As a result, four of Desai's films, Dharam Veer, Chacha Bhatija, Parvarish, and Amar Akbar Anthony, were released in 1977. Incidentally, all of these would be amongst the top-grossing films of the year.

=== Marketing ===
For the film's marketing, erasers with the images of Vinod Khanna, Rishi Kapoor, and Amitabh Bachchan were sold to students. Posters, postcards, and song booklets of the film were sold in shops. Colourful vests and metal crosses that were similar to the ones worn by Bachchan in the film achieved popularity.

== Reception ==
The film grossed ₹155 million (US$17.69 million) at the Indian box office and was the highest-grossing Bollywood film at the Indian Box Office for the year 1977. It has since been regarded as one of the most iconic films of Indian cinema.

Adjusted for inflation, the film has grossed approximately ₹423 crores ($51 million) as of 2023.

== Accolades ==
In 2023, Time Out ranked it #10 on its list of the "100 Best Bollywood Movies."

Award	Category	Recipients and nominees	Results
25th Filmfare Awards	Best Actor	Amitabh Bachchan	Won
25th Filmfare Awards	Best Music Director	Laxmikant–Pyarelal	Won
25th Filmfare Awards	Best Editing	Kamlakar Karkhanis	Won
25th Filmfare Awards	Best Film	Manmohan Desai	Nominated
25th Filmfare Awards	Best Director	Manmohan Desai	Nominated
25th Filmfare Awards	Best Lyricist	Anand Bakshi for "Parda Hai Parda"	Nominated
25th Filmfare Awards	Best Male Playback Singer	Mohammed Rafi for "Parda Hai Parda"	Nominated

== Bibliography ==
- Booth, Gregory D. (2008). Behind the curtain: Making music in Mumbai's film studios. Oxford University Press. ISBN 978-0-19-971665-4.
- Elison, William; Novetzke, Christian Lee; Rotman, Andy (2016). Amar Akbar Anthony: Bollywood, brotherhood, and the nation. Harvard University Press. ISBN 9780674504486.
- Haham, Connie (2006). Enchantment of the mind: Manmohan Desai's films. Roli Books. ISBN 978-81-7436-431-9.
