= Majorda =

- Village
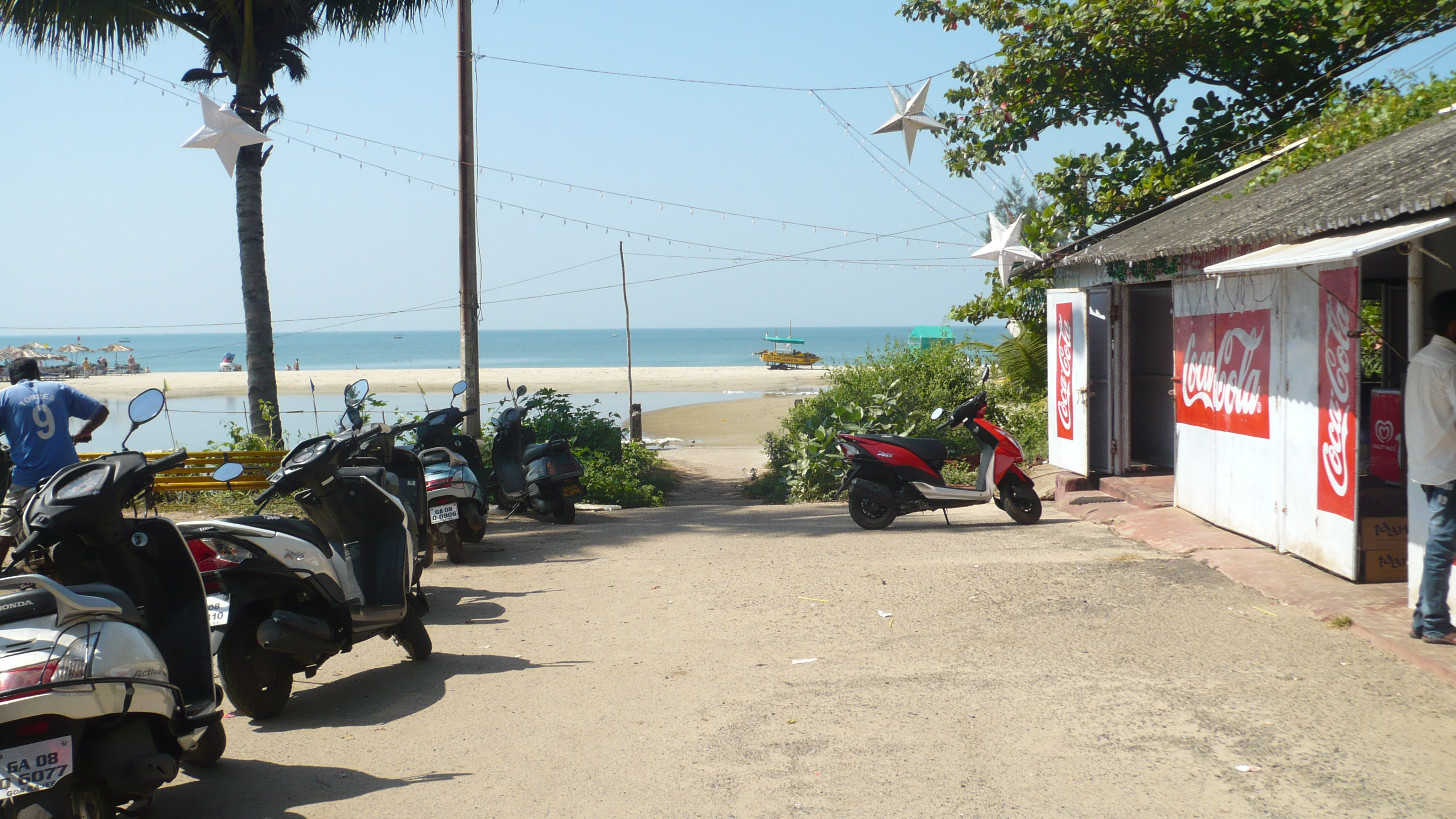

- Location of Majorda in Goa Majorda (India)
- Coordinates: 15°18′58″N 73°55′11″E
- Country: India
- State: Goa
- District: South Goa
- Sub-district: Salcete

Government
  - Sarpanch: Edward Da Costa

Population (2011)
  - Total: 2,813
- Time zone: UTC+5:30 (IST)
- PIN: 403713
- Area code: 0832
- Nearest city: Margão

Majorda is a village in Salcete, Goa. It is located in South Goa district, north-west of Margão. The village is famous for its beaches.

== Demographics ==
As of 2011 Indian census, Majorda had a population of 2,813. Males constitute 46% of the population and females 54%. Majorda has a literacy rate of 93.23%, higher than state average of 88.70%. Male literacy rate is 93.78%, and female literacy rate is 92.77%. In Majorda, 10.20% of the population is under 6 years of age.

== Landmarks ==
Majorda has a railway station. The parish church of the village is Mãe de Deus (Mother Of God) Church.

== Notable people ==
- Anthony Gonsalves, (1927 – 2012) Bollywood music composer
