= Antonio González =

Antonio González may refer to:

- Antonio González de Aguilar, 8th Marquis of la Vega de Armijo (1824–1908), Spanish noble and politician
- Antonio González Álvarez (born 1940), Spanish footballer
- Antonio González de Balcarce (1774–1819), Argentine military commander
- Antonio González Caballero (1927–2003), Mexican painter, pedagogue and screenwriter
- Antonio González (field hockey) (born 1969), Spanish field hockey goalkeeper
- Antonio González (footballer) (born 1936), Paraguayan footballer
- Antonio González y González, 1st Marquess of Valdeterrazo (1792–1876), Spanish politician, diplomat and lawyer
- Antonio González (javelin thrower) (born 1956), Cuban javelin thrower
- Antonio González (martyr) (died 1637), Roman Catholic martyr and saint
- Antonio González Pacheco (1946–2020), Spanish police officer
- Antonio González Rodríguez (born 1982), Spanish footballer
- Antonio González Terol (born 1978), Spanish politician
- Antonio González Velázquez (1723-1793), Spanish late-Baroque painter
- Antonio Gonzalez Middle School, Texas, United States, part of the United Independent School District

== See also ==
- Antonio Gonzales (born 1986), Peruvian footballer
- Tony Gonzalez (disambiguation)
