= Jazz in India =

Indian music genre

Jazz music in India originated in the 1920s in Mumbai (formerly known as Bombay) and in Kolkata (formerly known as Calcutta), where African-American jazz musicians performed. They inspired Goan musicians who then absorbed aspects of jazz into the sounds of India’s Hindi film music industry. There has been much interaction between Indian music and jazz music. An active jazz scene exists today in cities like Mumbai (formerly known as Bombay), Pune, Delhi, Goa, and Kolkata.

== History ==
In India, jazz was probably first performed regularly in the metropoles Calcutta and Bombay in the early or middle 1920s. The era from the 1930s to the 1950s is often called as the golden age of jazz in India. It began with jazz musicians like Leon Abbey, Crickett Smith, Creighton Thompson, Ken Mac, Roy Butler, Teddy Weatherford (who recorded with Louis Armstrong), and Rudy Jackson who toured India to avoid the racial discrimination they faced in the United States. In the winter of 1935, Leon Abbey, a violinist from Minnesota brought the first 8-piece band to Bombay.

In the 1930s, India’s freedom struggle against the British had reached a crucial stage. Bombay was a rising metropolis. There was also a great sense of political freedom, which was being transmitted into the arts. The ballrooms of five-star hotels and in the nightclubs of major Indian cities were jazz centres. As nationalism swept the country, these venues became the refuge of the European and Indian elite, the aristocrats, the moneyed and the public servants. During this period, musicians such as Chic Chocolate, Frank Fernand, Micky Correa, Rudy Cotton, Hal and Henry Green, Josic Menzie, Pamela McCarthy, and Chris Perry were at the forefront of the burgeoning jazz scene in Bombay, the nerve center of which was at the Taj Mahal hotel ballroom, which became the node of essential transmission of cultural messages between East and West. These musicians often played at five-star hotels, but they were regulars at the second level, at the Ambassador Starlight Roof Gardens, the Bristol Grill, the Dadar Catholic Institute, the Greens Hotel, the Ritz Roof Garden, the West End Hotel Roof Garden and the YMCA. Many of these musicians were Goans, because Goans learnt western music under Portuguese rule. Most of the Goan jazz musicians also worked in the Bollywood film industry and were responsible for the introduction of genres like jazz and swing to Hindi film music. Although jazz in India began as an entertainment for the elite, it made its way to the working class and into Hindi films. Frank Fernand and Anthony Gonsalves not only infused the sound of western music into Bollywood, but were also filled with India's new-found nationalism and developed an authentic foundation to link the world of jazz with that of Indian classical music. The jazz fraternity was also a melting pot of people of different communities because there were Goans, Anglo-Indians and people from other communities like Rudy Cotton who was a Parsi.

== Indo jazz ==
Jazz and Indian classical music share some similarities, one of them being that they both involve improvisation. Musicians realised this and collaborations between Indian classical musicians and Western jazz musicians which had commenced in the 1940s led to the development of a new genre of music called Indo jazz consisting of jazz, classical and Indian influences. Ravi Shankar, John Coltrane, John Mayer and John McLaughlin were some of the pioneers of the fusion of jazz and Indian music. Conversely, Indian classical music has also had a significant impact on a subgenre of jazz music known as free jazz.
