= My Name Is Anthony Gonsalves (song) =

"My name Is Anthony Gonsalves"

Song by Kishore Kumar and Amitabh Bachchan

from the album Amar Akbar Anthony
- Released: 1977
- Recorded: 1977
- Genre: Film score
- Songwriter: Anand Bakshi
- Composer: Laxmikant–Pyarelal

"My Name is Anthony Gonsalves" is a song from the 1977 Hindi film Amar Akbar Anthony. One unusual feature of this song is that the actor featured in its picturization, Amitabh Bachchan, provides vocals along with Kishore Kumar. Amitabh speaks and Kumar sings. It is shown in a sequence which in a reception, Anthony (Bachchan) sings and performs to be close to Jenny (Parveen Babi), for which her bodyguard keeps him away from her.

The song was composed by duo Laxmikant–Pyarelal. The character Anthony Gonsalves is named after Anthony Gonsalves, a music teacher of Pyarelal Ramprasad Sharma who was one of the most famous music arrangers in Bombay in the 1930s. He had among his students the likes of RD Burman apart from Pyarelal.

Special effects are used for comic purposes in the picturisation of this song.

The opening line, "You are a sophisticated rhetorician intoxicated by the exuberance of your own verbosity", that is spoken by Anthony when he emerges from the Easter egg, is an almost exact quotation from a speech in the Parliament of the United Kingdom given by British Prime Minister Benjamin Disraeli in 1878. Disraeli (who was referring to William Ewart Gladstone) used the word "inebriated" rather than "intoxicated". Anthony Gonsalves was also the name of the arranger for the famous music director Salil Chaudhary.

== See also ==
- Parda Hai Parda
- My Name Is Anthony Gonsalves (2007 film)
