= Music in ancient India =

Music in ancient India, can be reproduced from written works dating to the Indian classical period, such as the Nātya Shastra, and through surviving examples of liturgical music such as the hymns of the Samaveda. Musical instruments dating to the prehistoric period have been recovered from archaeological excavations.

== Prehistoric music ==
=== Archaeological discoveries ===
Musical instruments, such as the seven-holed flute and various types of stringed instruments such as ravanahatha, cymbals have been recovered from Indus Valley Civilization archaeological sites. Evidence suggests use of drum or dhol in the Indus Valley Civilization. There have not been a lot of depictions of musical instruments from IVC, but contemporary BMAC civilization which traded with it has archaeological depictions of lyre and many cylinderical drums were also discovered from Indus Valley. A kind of harp is also depicted in the Chalcolithic cave drawings of India along with Gong. There is also evidence of dancing figurines from Indus valley civilization suggesting an established musical tradition. A kind of lithophone has also been discovered from Orissa around 1000 BCE.

=== Surviving music ===
The Samaveda, one of the ancient core Hindu scriptures known as the Vedas, consists of a collection (samhita) of hymns, portions of hymns and detached verses, all but 75 of which are taken from the Rigveda. They were intended to be sung using melodies called Samagana whose musical forms are indicated. These hymns were sung by Udgatar priests at sacrifices in which the juice of the Soma plant, clarified and mixed with milk and other ingredients, were offered in libation to various deities. This memorization by Hindu priests of the sacred Vedas included up to eleven musical forms of recitation that could be used on the same text.

== Nātya Shastra ==
The Nātya Shastra is an ancient Indian treatise on the performing arts, embracing Indian theatre, early Indian classical dance and Indian classical music. It was written between 200 BC and 200 AD, during the classical period of Indian history. This text, which contains 6000 shlokas, is attributed to a muni whose name was Bharata Muni.

The Nātya Shastra is based upon a much older text called the Nātya Veda, which contained 36,000 shlokas. No copies of the Nātya Veda have survived. Some scholars believe that it may have been written by various authors over a period of time.

== See also ==
- Origins and history of Carnatic music
- Ancient Tamil music
- Music in ancient China
- Music of ancient Greece
- Music of ancient Rome
