= Anthony Gonsalves =

Indian composer (1927–2012)

- Born: Anthony Prabhu Gonsalves; 12 June 1927; Majorda, Goa, Portuguese India
- Died: 18 January 2012 (aged 84); Goa Medical College, Bambolim, Goa, India

Anthony Prabhu Gonsalves (12 June 1927 – 18 January 2012) was an Indian musical composer, music arranger and teacher. He was popularised as a lead character in the 1977 hit, Amar Akbar Anthony, played by Amitabh Bachchan, was named after him, especially with the song, "My Name Is Anthony Gonsalves".

== Early life ==
Gonsalves was born in the village of Majorda (near Margão in Portuguese India), His father, Jose Antonio Gonsalves, was a choirmaster at Majorda's Mãe de Deus church. Musically precocious, Gonsalves quickly absorbed his father's lessons and then, barely into his teens, went to Bombay to join his fellow Goan musicians. During the mid-1950s, he attempted to merge the symphonies of his Goan heritage with the Hindustani melodies and rhythms in films of the day.

== Career ==
Gonsalves found his first job in the city as a violinist in the group of the composer Naushad in 1943. He taught Pyarelal Sharma of Laxmikant–Pyarelal team and has worked with most of the legendary composers of the 1950s and 1960s. A few examples of his work are B.R. Chopra (Naya Daur, Waqt), Naushad (Dillagi), and Chetan Anand (Haqeeqat). The song "My Name Is Anthony Gonsalves" was Pyarelal's tribute to his violin teacher.

In 1958, Gonsalves founded the Indian Symphony Orchestra (as distinct from the Symphony Orchestra of India) featuring playback singers Lata Mangeshkar and Manna Dey as soloists, the works were performed in the quadrangle of St. Xavier's College, Bombay.

In 1965, Gonsalves quit the film industry and went to the United States, via a travelling grant from Syracuse University in New York. He became a member of the American Society of Composers, Publishers and Authors, and later in returned to India, settled in his ancestral village of Majorda in Goa, and continued composing music, though he never joined the Hindi films again. He died in 2012 of pneumonia and hypotension.

== Music arrangement in Indian movies ==
- Dholak (1950)
- Pehli Nazar (1945)
- Mahal (1949)

== Influences in Indian popular culture ==
- "My Name Is Anthony Gonsalves", a song in the 1977 film Amar Akbar Anthony
  - My Name Is Anthony Gonsalves (2007), a film titled on the song
- Anthony Gonsalves, in Raj Comics by Tarunkumar Wahi

== Death ==
On 18 January 2012, Gonsalves died at Goa Medical College in Bambolim, due to pneumonia.
