= Konkani liturgical music =

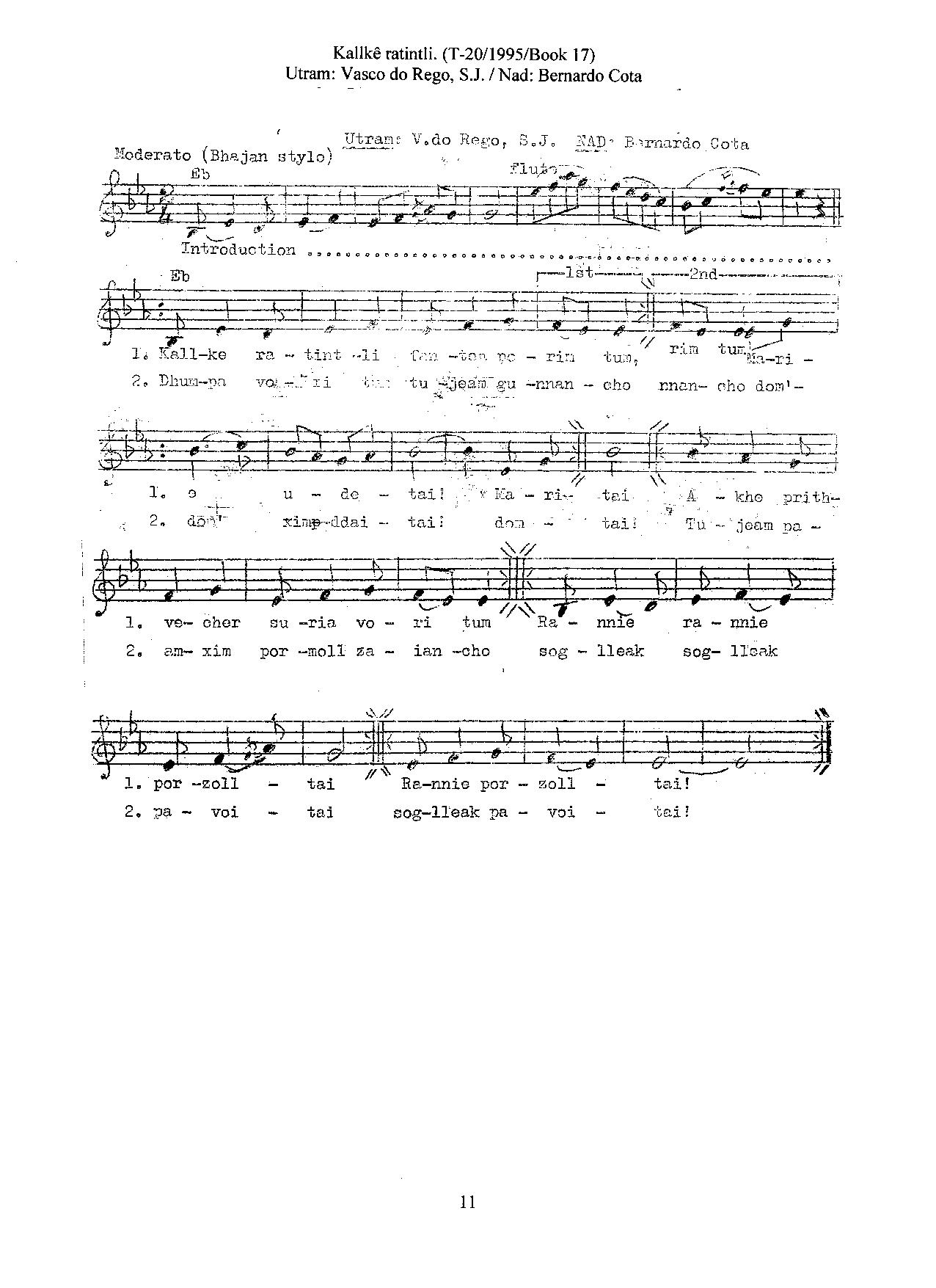
A Konkani hymn with staff notation

Konkani liturgical music refers to the sacred music used in the liturgy in the Konkani language. Konkani is used in liturgy in the Archdiocese of Goa and Daman, and the dioceses of Mangalore, Karwar, Udupi and Sindhudurg.

== History ==
Prior to Vatican II, most of the liturgy was in Latin. When liturgy in vernacular languages was introduced in Vatican II, Fr. Vasco do Rego SJ led the effort to compose the needed Konkani liturgical music.

Goan composers developed a rich and unique form of motets for the Lenten season, which were accompanied by violins, clarinets and double bass. Goan church authorities had obtained special permission from the Holy See to use these instruments during the Holy Week services. Unfortunately, most of these Konkani motets were not preserved and have been lost.

There were similar efforts made independently in Mangalore in the field of Konkani liturgical music.

== Choirs ==
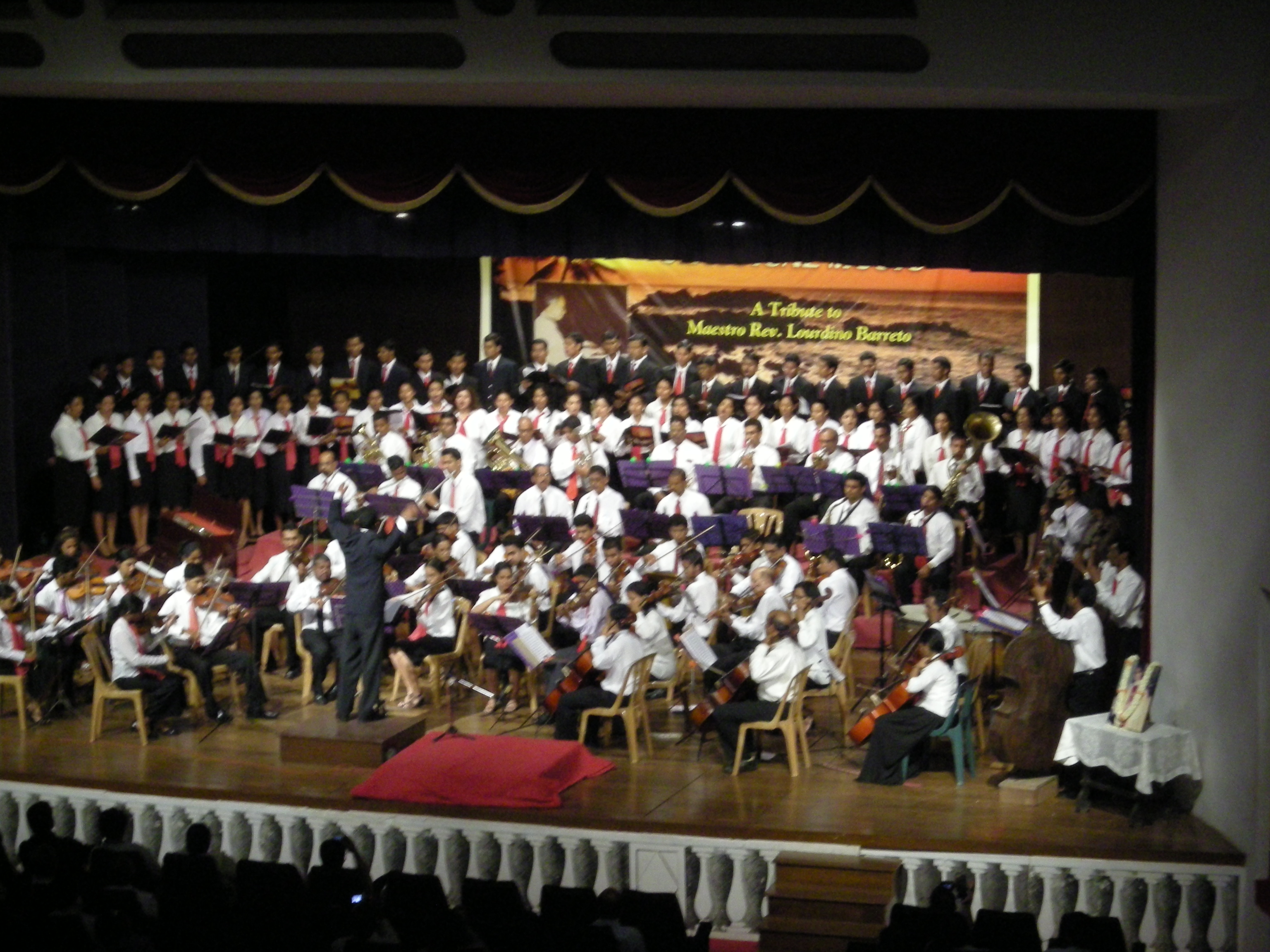
Concert of Classical Music in tribute to Maestro Lourdino Barretto, presented by the Santa Cecilia Choir, conducted by Rev. Romeo Monteiro, at Goa (April 2008).

There are organised choirs in most Catholic churches. A notable choir from Goa is the all-male seminarians' Santa Cecilia Choir (Coro di Santa Cecilia), part of the over 400 year old Rachol seminary (Seminário de Rachol) of Goa. The choir has also been known to use a 16th-century restored pipe organ for its concerts.

== Publications ==
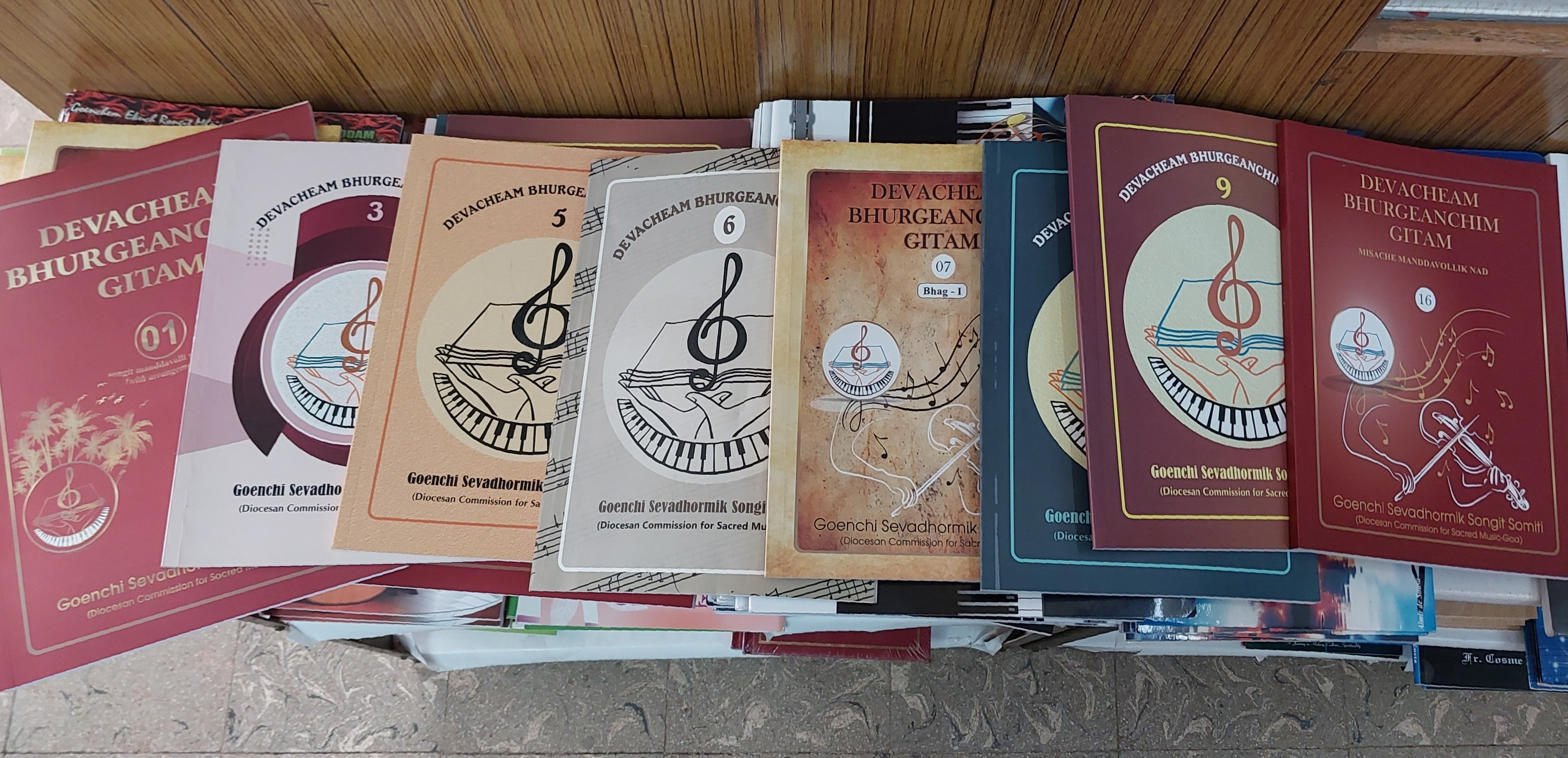
Various volumes of Devacheam Bhurgeanchim Gitam

- Gaionancho Jhelo, the official hymnal of the Archdiocese of Goa.
- Devacheam Bhurgeanhim Gitam, a sheet music periodical, of the Archdiocese of Goa.
- Da Costa, António. Songs of Praise: Adlim Kristi Bhogtigitam. ISBN 978-93-80739-41-0., a compilation of Konkani hymns, including many hymns that are much older than the Gaionancho Jhelo.

== Notable personalities ==
- Fr. Vasco do Rego SJ wrote lyrics for over 300 Konkani hymns, and composed music for over 50 Konkani hymns. He commenced the compilation of the Gaionancho Jhelo. He also wrote the first Konkani carols.
- Fr. Lourdino Barreto was an expert in both, Western and Indian music. He was the president of Goa's Diocesan Commission for Sacred Music, and has been described as "the best musicologist East of the Suez".
