= Gaionancho Jhelo =

Official hymnal of the Archdiocese of Goa and Daman

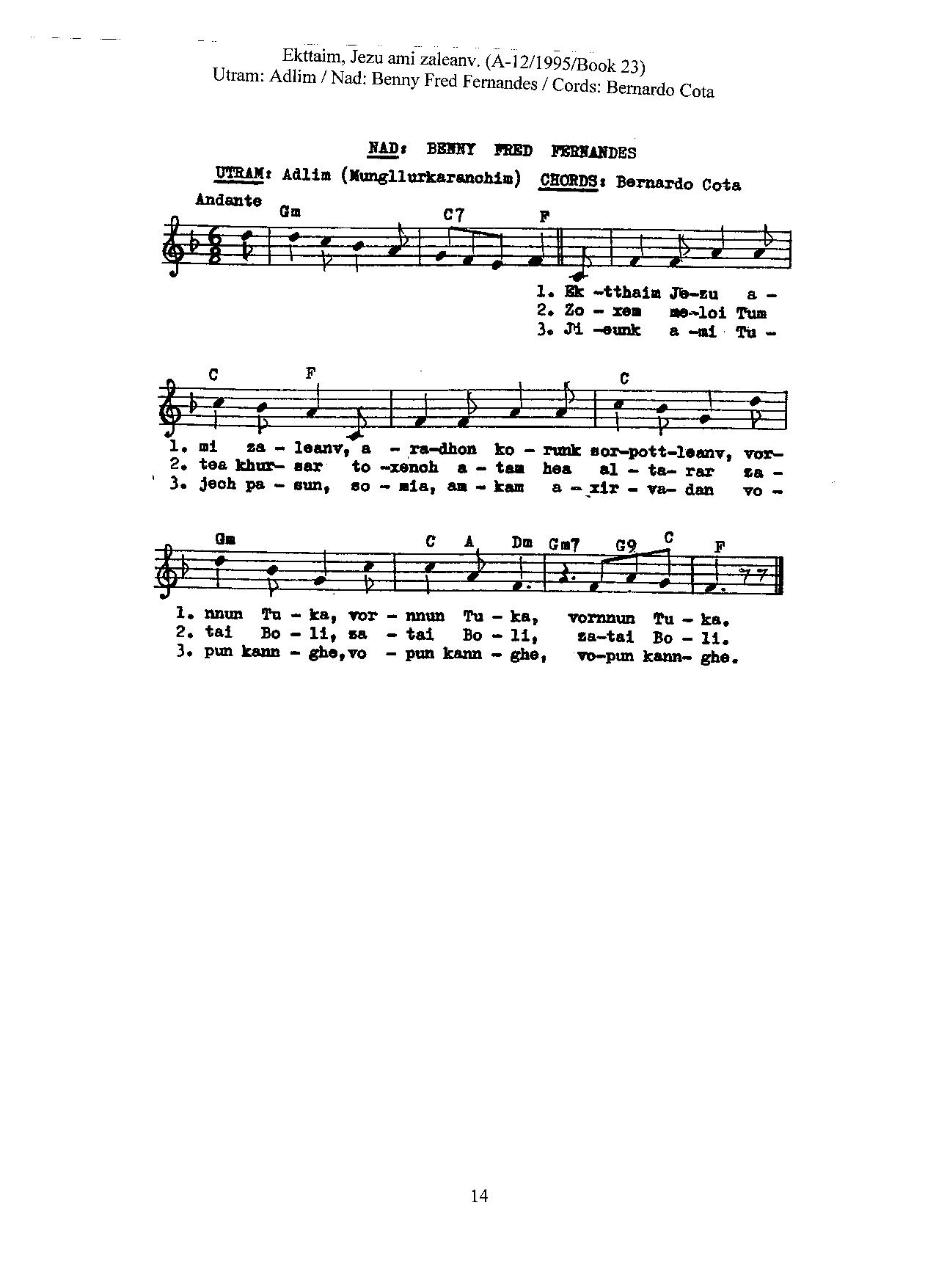

Gaionancho Jhelo (Konkani: Garland of hymns) is the official hymnal of the Archdiocese of Goa and Daman. It was first published a few years after liturgy in vernacular languages was introduced in the Second Vatican Council. The latest edition was brought out in 1993.

Over 75 Goan composers, including priests and lay people participated in composing music for the hymns in this book. A major contributor to the hymnal was Fr. Vasco do Rego SJ, who wrote many of the hymns. Gaionancho Jhelo originated as a booklet of hymns that Fr. Rego began composing in 1963. Other important contributors were Fr. Lourdino Barreto, Fr. Bernardo Cota, Fr. Saturnino Dias, Belarmino Lobo, Fr. Lino de Sa and Fr. Joaquim Loiola Pereira.

== See also ==
- Konkani liturgical music
