= Bible translations into Konkani =

The history of Bible translations into the Konkani language begins with Ignazio Arcamone (1615–1683), an Italian Jesuit working in Salcette, Goa was the first to translate parts of the Bible to Konkani language. It was published under the title "Sogllea Vorunsache Vanjel" from Rachol Seminary Printing Press in 1667. Copies of this book are not available.

The New Testament was translated into Konkani in Latin script in 1818. The complete New Testament was first translated into Konkani in Kannada script by William Robert Da Silva in 1977. With the publication of Baibol in 1997, he became the first person to translate the complete Bible into Konkani. He translated it single-handedly over 30 years. The second complete translation was done by William B. Barboza in 2000 titled Pavitr Pustak. Both these were printed in Kannada script. The third complete translation was edited by Manuel Gomes in 2006 titled Povitr Pustok. It was printed in Latin script. Others who translated parts of the Bible into Konkani are William Carey at Serampore, West Bengal; Joaquim A. Fernandes, Mumbai; Rymond Mascarenhas, Mangalore; Sylvester Menezes, Mangalore; C.C.A. Pai, S.J., Mangalore; Fr. Vasco do Rego SJ, Goa; Moreno de Souza, S.J., Goa; and Felicio Cardozo, Goa
