= Santa Cecilia Choir =

Indian male choir

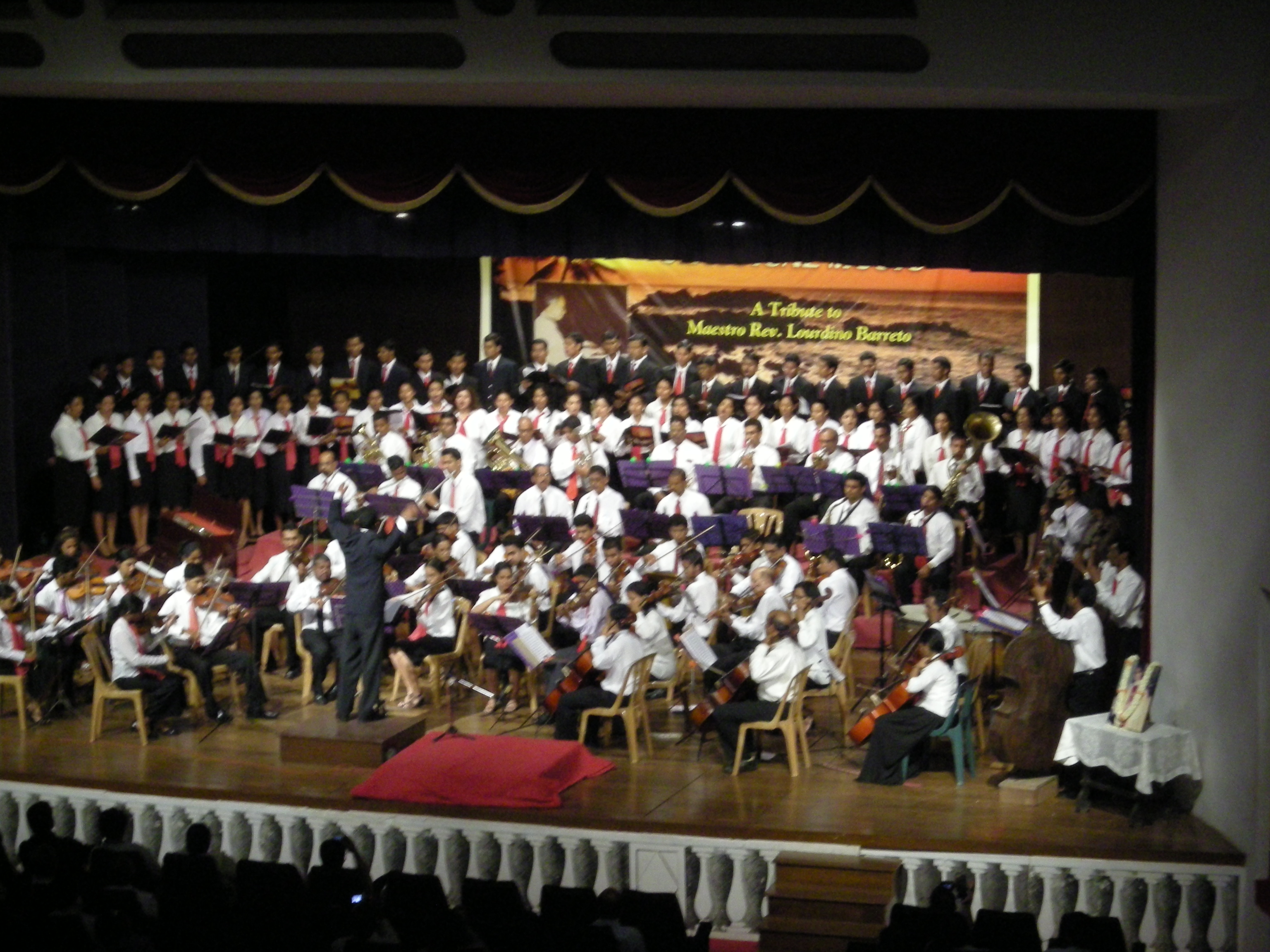
The Concert of Classical Music in tribute to Maestro Lourdino Barreto, presented by the Santa Cecilia Choir, conducted by Rev. Romeo Monteiro, at Kala Academy (Panjim-Goa), in April 2008.

The Santa Cecilia Choir (Portuguese: Coro di Santa Cecilia) is a polyphonic male choir composed of seminarians of the Rachol Seminary of the Catholic Archdiocese of Goa and Daman in Goa, India.

== History ==
In compliance with the wishes of Dom Antonio Sebastião Valente, the Archbishop of Goa and the first Prelate to be conferred the title of Patriarch of the East Indies, the seminarians organised themselves into a choral society. It was on 11 April 1897, that the first meeting of the choir was held in the hall of Dom Sebastião at the Rachol Seminary and was attended by the founder members: Msgr. Matheus d' Oliveira (Rector), Fr. Agostinho da Rocha (Professor of Music) Sem. Pedro Antonio Lopes (Choir Master), Fr. Luis Bruno Menezes and twelve other seminarians. The newly born Choir was baptised Orpheon Palestriniano do Seminário (Palestrianian Orpheon of the Seminary) or simply Coro Palestriniano. From the name, it is evident that the initial aim of the Choir was to promote sacred polyphonic chant, according to the method of the famous Italian Composer Giovanni Pierluigi da Palestrina, who lived during the late 16th century, and was a pioneer in the sacred music of his age.

On 23 March 1905, the same Archbishop-Patriarch gave new statutes to this association and determined that in future it should be named simply Coro de Santa Cecilia (Santa Cecilia Choir). The change was perhaps to place the Choir under the patronage of St. Cecilia, the patroness of music and musicians, and to allow the Choir to venture into other forms of music rather than restrict itself to the Palestrinian form only. It is with this name that the Seminary Choir went down in history and is known even today.

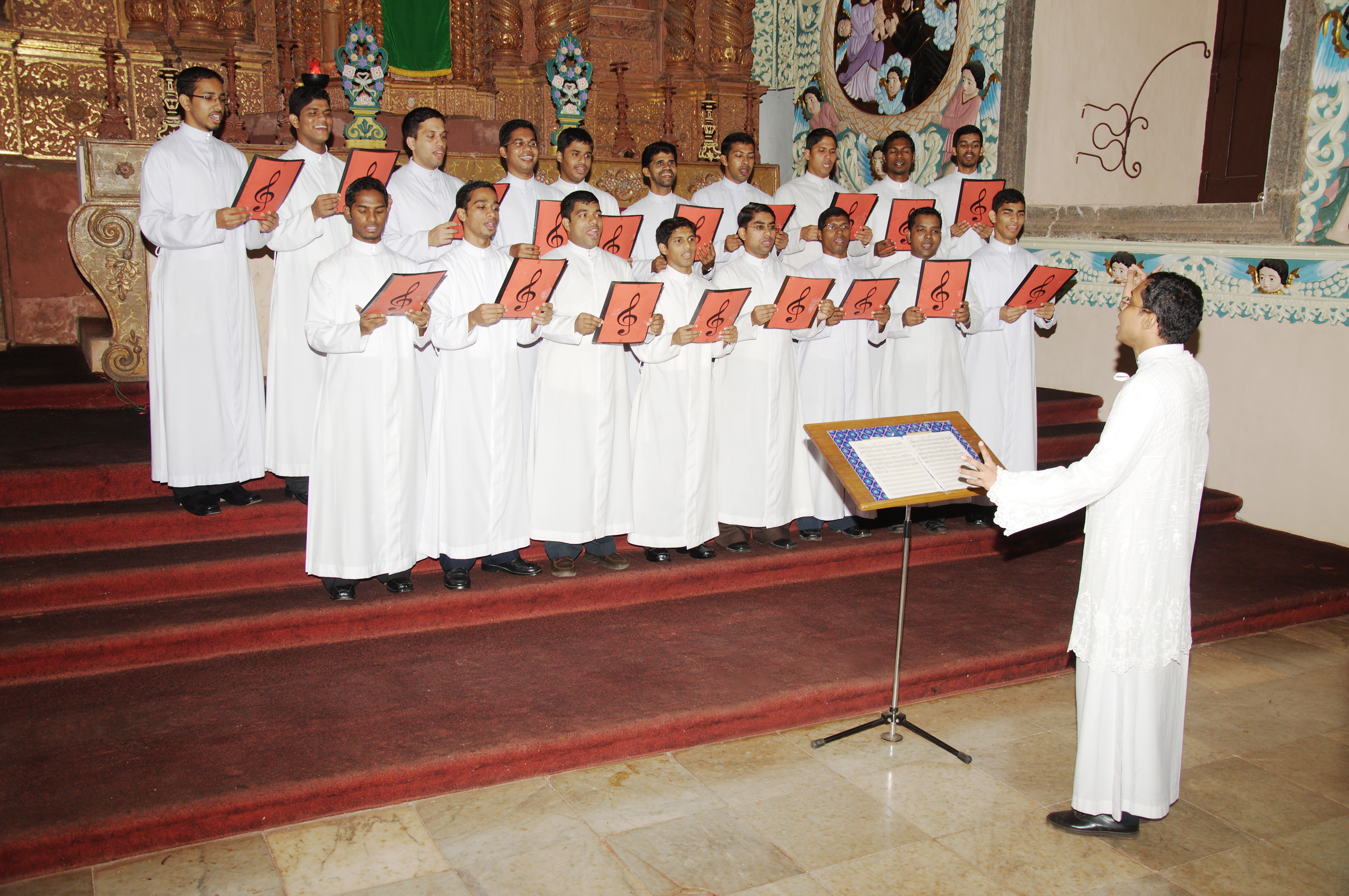
Seminarians (ordinary members of the choir) singing under the baton of Rev. Romeo Monteiro, Professor of Music at the Seminary (2010)

Today, this male TTBB Choir, presided over by the Rector of the Seminary, continues to function and dedicates itself to promoting the sacred heritage of music of the Catholic Church. The professor of music in the seminary is the vice-president and Conductor of the choir. The other "ordinary" members (about sixteen in number) are chosen at the beginning of the academic by the Professor of Music. Formerly, these members were called membros efectivos (effective members) and were elected by secret ballot, from among the general members of the choir. They were also granted certain privileges in the Seminary; this is no longer the case. Besides, as the need suggest or the occasion demands, others (seminarians and laity) are invited to join in the singing as "extra-ordinary members" of the Choir. From among the ordinary members, one is chosen to perform the task of Chorus Master and Secretary. His main responsibility is to look into the day-to-day functioning of the Choir and rehearse for the approaching programs.

== Past directors ==
The Santa Cecilia Choir has sung uninterrupted under the direction of renowned musicians who were appointed Professors of Music at the Seminary. Here is a list of the Directors of the Santa Cecilia Choir:

- Rev. Agostinho de Rocha (founder Director)
- Rev. Luis Bruno Menezes
- Rev. Francisco Domingos Luis
- Rev. Sebastião Luis
- Rev. Lellis de Vitoria e Souza (1945–1951)
- Maestro Rev. Camilo António da Conceicão Xavier (1951–1983)
- Maestro Rev. Dr. Lourdino Paulo Barreto (1983–1984)
- Rev. Tomé Bernardo Cota (1984–2007)
- Rev. Romeo Monteiro (2007–2013)

== Significance ==
For over a century, this characteristic male Choir of young seminarians from India has proved its calibre and excellence in polyphony of different genres, secular as well as religious. Following the directives given by the Second Vatican Ecumenical Council, the Santa Cecilia Choir has stood out in preserving and developing the rich musical patrimony of the Catholic Church. The Choir is proud of a rich repertoire of religious and secular music in Latin, English and the vernaculars: Bach, Handel, Beethoven, Mozart, Verdi, Schubert, Palestrina, Praglia, Rossini, Liberto, Martins, Xavier, Barreto, Paranjoti, etc. In recent years, it has also performed pop-polyphonic music. Traditionally, every year, the Choir sings a solemn polyphonic mass in Latin, interspaced with Gregorian chant, on the occasion of the feast of St. Ignatius of Loyola, Patron of the Seminary Church. Perhaps, today, it is the only exponent of Gregorian chant in India. Various choral recitals, featuring religious and secular music are held in the seminary on different occasions.

On 31 July 1997, the Choir celebrated the centenary of its inception, with a solemn Eucharist presided by Archbishop-Patriarch Raul Nicolau Gonsalves. The Cecilians, under the baton of Rev. Bernardo Cota, rendered Messe in G dur by Franz Schubert, besides the hymns of the mass in Konkani. Te Deum in A by Arnold Furlotti was also sung by the young seminarians. The Choir was ably supported by a string quintet, composed of seminarians.

== Concerts ==
From 2007 onwards, the Choir, under the baton of Rev. Romeo Monteiro, and in association with ex-members and other music lovers, has given several well-appreciated performances of sacred and secular music, in the cities of Panjim, Margao, Old Goa. The first performance in this series was held in Old Goa, as a tribute to the great music legend of Goa, the late Maestro Rev. Lourdino Barreto, ex-member and ex-director of the Choir, on the occasion of his tenth death anniversary. The following year, the Cecilian choir presented the secular repertoire of Maestro Barreto at a gala concert held at the Kala Academy, Panjim, where Barreto had served as Director of the Western Music School. The Santa Cecilia Choir also featured at the Monte Festival of Music, Old Goa, in Feb. 2010 and the World Konkani Cultural Convention in Mangalore, in Dec. 2010. It was a privilege for the Choir which was invited by the Apostolic Nuncio to India, His Excellency Most Rev. Salvatore Pennacchio, on 19–20 April 2012, to New Delhi, to animate the singing at the solemn Eucharist and to present a Programme in honour of Pope Benedict XVI, on the 7th anniversary of His Pontificate. The Gregorian Chants and other soul-lifting liturgical hymns were greatly appreciated by the Apostolic Nuncio and by the Prelates and laity who participated in the Eucharist.

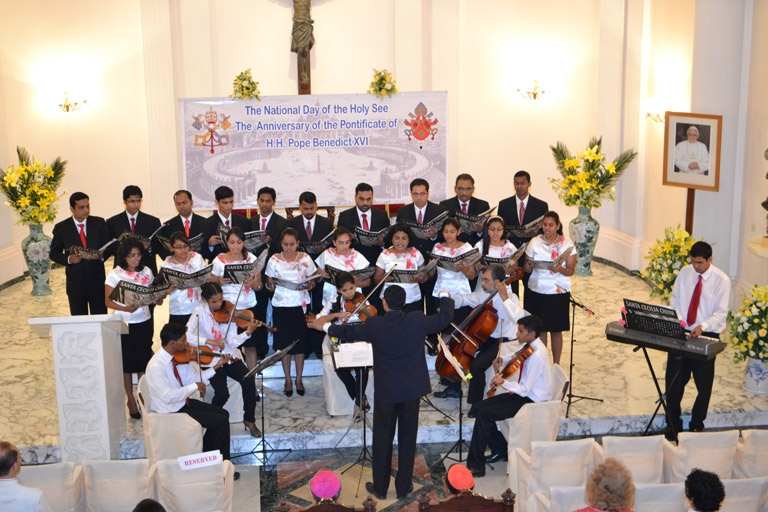
Concert at the Apostolic Nunciature, New Delhi, in April 2012

The Programme of Sacred Music on the following day, which consisted in Latin, English, Hindi, Sanskrit and Konkani repertoire, was a spectacular performance.

== Fourth centenary celebrations ==
On 1 November 2010, on the occasion of the inauguration of the Fourth Centenary Celebrations of the Seminary, the Choir led the congregation with soul-elevating renderings in Latin and Konkani. There were in all 80 singers (seminarians and laity), accompanied by the restored 19th century pipe organ and an ensemble of 15 musicians. It was a celestial moment when the Choir led the congregation in sing the Gloria taken from the sublime Missa De Angelis in Gregorian chant, with polyphonic choral responses composed by Msgr. Giuseppe Liberto. Maestro Liberto was at that time Director of the Sistine Choir in Rome. He had lent his work, originally composed for the Installation Ceremony of Benedict XVI, to be utilized on for the Jubilee of the Rachol Seminary.

The brilliant performance of Sacred Music, at the Basilica of Bom Jesus, on 11 April 2011, was something rare in the musical annals of Goa. This program, with the participation of about 150 singers and musicians, brought the Fourth Centenary celebrations of Rachol Seminary to a close. The program for the evening comprised: Gloria (RV 588) by Antonio Vivaldi, hymns to St. Francis Xavier and Bl. Joseph Vaz and compositions by ex-Directors of the Choir. The Te Deum, sung in a polyphonic setting with the traditional Gregorian melody as refrain, proved to be a fitting finale of praise to the Most Holy Trinity for the 400 years of Rachol Seminary. The Archbishop-Patriarch, Most Rev. Filipe Neri Ferrão graced the occasion in the midst of a packed Basilica.

== Concert in memory of Rev. Cristóvão Caldeira ==
On 2 April 2012, a Concert of Sacred Music was held in memory of late Fr. Cristóvão Caldeira, former Rector of the Patriarchal Seminary of Rachol and the president of the Choir from 1993 to 2000. This programme held in the renovated Church of Santana-Talaulim, Ilhas, enthralled the audience that overflowed the grand Church with magnificent acoustics. Setting off with Pater Noster in plain chant, the Cecilians rendered excerpts from famous Requiem works by renowned composers, ranging from the 18th to the 21st century: Introit and Kyrie (by Gabriel Fauré), Dies irae (by Franz von Suppé), Lacrimosa (by W. A. Mozart), Pie Iesu (by Luigi Cherubini), Lux aeterna (by Maurice Duruflé) and The Lord is my shepherd (by John Rutter). The director, Fr. Monteiro, also inserted his composition in Latin and Konkani "Dev-dut tuka voinkunttant gheun vhorum". Set to orchestra and choir in four voices, this composition was comparable to those of the masters, and unveiled the deep riches of the text which otherwise goes unnoticed and even unheard in the din of activity of funeral services when it is recited. Besides the choir also sang a traditional Goan motet (Khorench sangtam) and some well known chorales: Were you there? (by Raymond Haan) and Since by Man – Worthy is the Lamb (from the Messiah, by G. F. Handel). On the occasion, an audio CD album, entitled 'TE DEUM' was released by the Archbishop. This album, produced by the Santa Cecilia Choir, showcases sacred music of several genres and styles, sung in Goa, during various periods of history. The compositions are by various composers, world-renowned and local, and are sung in various languages: Konkani, Latin, English, Hindi and Sanskrit.

== Concert to celebrate the "Year of Faith 2012–2013" ==
On 19 April 2013, the Choir, presented a concert of sacred music in the [Sé Catedral] Cathedral Church at Old Goa, to commemorate the "Year of Faith 2012–2013", proclaimed by Pope Benedict XVI and celebrated by Catholics worldworld.

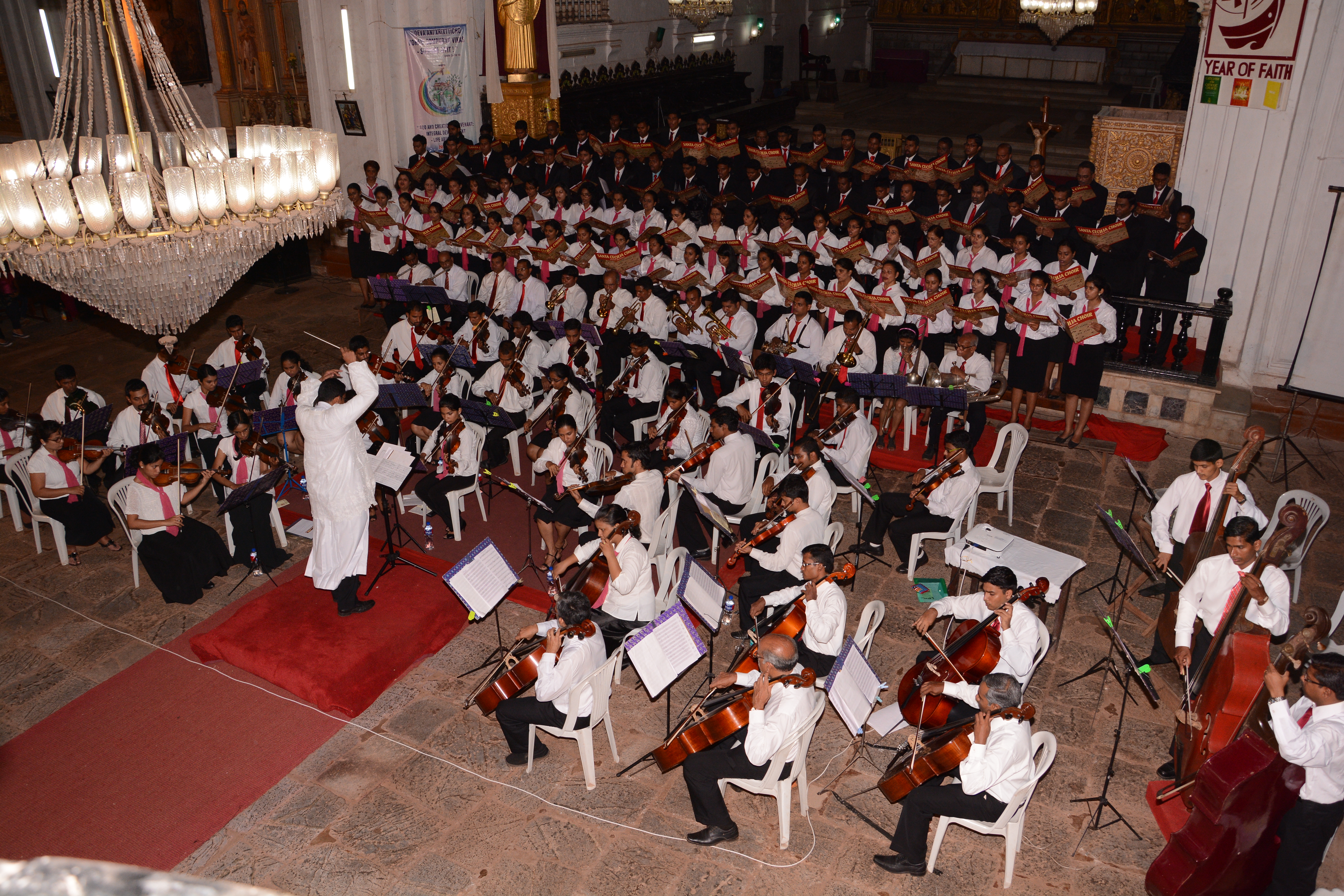
Concert of Sacred Music to celebrate the Year of Faith, held at the See Cathedral, Old Goa, in April 2013

This solemn concert of Sacred Catholic music was presented by 140 dedicated artists (88 singers and 51 musicians), mostly youngsters. The evening began with the rendition of the Pontifical Anthem (by Gounod), in honour of the See of Peter. After introductory words by the Parish Priest of the cathedral, Fr. Leonardo Correia, the Choir sang some simple Catholic prayer-formulas, viz. "Santa Khursachi Kuru" (the sign of the cross, in Konkani), "Abun d'bashmayo" (the Our Father as believed by the Catholic Church to have been actually prayed by Jesus in the original Aramaic-Syrian chant), "Namaste Mary'yame" (the Hail Mary, in Sanskrit Vedic chant), all composed and arranged by Rev. Romeo Monteiro. "Mhoima Bapak", a Konkani doxology to the Holy Trinity, composed by Rev. Bernardo Cota, ended the first part of the Concert. The second part of the performance consisted of a rendition of different versions of the Creed that encapsulates the faith of the Catholic Church. Three models of creeds were chosen for the evening: the traditional Latin Credo (in Gregorian chant), "Credo" from the famous Coronation Mass (by W. A. Mozart), and finally "Sot'mantam" in Konkani (by Fr. Monteiro). The third part of the Musical Concert contained the Easter proclamation through the work of the reputed German composer L. van Beethoven – "Hallelujah Chorus" from Christus am Ölberge (Christ on the Mount of Olives). This was followed by a Goan version of the Easter invocation to Mary, Regina caeli (arranged by Maestro Rev. Lourdino Barreto and orchestrated by Fr. Monteiro). The traditional Goan "Exultemos com alegria", in Portuguese (arranged by Fr. Monteiro), ended the evening bringing nostalgic memories of this hymn which used to be sung at Litanies in Goa.

== See also ==
- Konkani liturgical music
