= Ignazio Arcamone =

- Born: c. 1615; Bari, Kingdom of Naples
- Died: 30 April 1683 (aged 67–68); Rachol, Goa, India
- Occupations: Jesuit missionary, linguist, orientalist
- Known for: First translation of Bible parts into Konkani; First comparative grammar of Indian languages
- Notable work: Sagallea Varussache Vangel (1667), Ianua Indica

Ignazio Arcamone (1614/1615 – 30 April 1683) was an Italian Jesuit missionary in India, one of the first Italian orientalists and the first to translate part of the Bible into an Indian language.

== Life ==
Arcamone was born at Bari in either 1614 or 1615. He joined the Jesuits at Naples on 21 or 22 August 1631. He studied letters at the Jesuit college in Massa Lubrense and then philosophy and theology at the Collegio Massimo in Naples. He had a gift for languages, claiming in one letter to have learned Hebrew in twenty days. He taught at Barletta and Lecce. From his letters, it is apparent that he was inspired to be a missionary to East Asia by the recently martyrdom of the Jesuit Girolamo De Angelis. He received permission in 1643, left Naples in 1644 and arrived at Goa in India in 1645, where he continued his theological studies at the Jesuit college. In 1647, he wrote a report to Rome about how his study of Indian languages was coming along. That same year, because he knew Konkani and was living in Kanara, he was dispatched by the Portuguese as a diplomat to the Nayak king Shivappa, who was demanding the Portuguese withdraw from Kanara.

On 31 July 1651, Arcamone took the vows of a Jesuit missionary. Although he served as a missionary in India for over twenty years, there is no detailed information about his activities. He became vicar and curate of Saxtty and in 1679 rector of the college at Rachol, where he died on 30 April 1683.

== Works ==
Arcamone wrote at least six works, all unpublished.

- Purgatorii commentarium concannice compositum (1663) is a Konkani treatise on Purgatory known from a manuscript in the Biblioteca Casanatense in Rome.
- De Salsetana peninsula commentarius (1664) is a geographical description of Saxtty dedicated to the superior general, Giovanni Paolo Oliva. It is known from a manuscript in the Biblioteca Nazionale Vittorio Emanuele III in Rome.
- Sagallea Varussache Vangel (1667) is a translation into Konkani of the annual readings from the Gospels and Epistles and "the first translation of any portion of the Bible into an Indian (particularly Indo-Aryan) tongue". It is found in manuscript no. 12 of the seminary at Rachol.
- Explicationes et assumpta in Evangeliis dominicalibus (1667) is an apologetic treatise in Konkani, known to Nathaniel Bacon from a manuscript in Rachol.
- Conciones pro festis in solemnitatibus totius anni (1668) is an apologetic treatise in Konkani, known to Bacon from a manuscript in Rachol.
- Ianua Indica (date unknown) is a grammar of Konkani, including a Latin–Konkani glossary. It also contains the first comparative grammar of two Indian languages, in which Konkani is compared to Marathi. A manuscript is kept in the National Library of Portugal in Lisbon. Arcamone notes that "Konkani syntax is hardly different from that of Latin" and that Marathi syntax is "almost the same as that of Konkani".
