= Vasco do Rego =

Indian Jesuit priest (1925–2021)

Vasco do Rego SJ (8 January 1925 – 17 February 2021) was an Indian Jesuit priest who played a significant role in the promotion of Konkani language, literature and music, particularly after the Annexation of Goa. He was the editor of the religious monthly Dor Mhoineachi Rotti for many years. Rego is credited with playing an important role in translating the Old Testament into Konkani.

== Konkani sacred music ==
Writing in the Herald newspaper, journalist Melvyn Misquita says it was a "humiliating experience" that led Rego to compose "Goa's first Konkani Carol in 1963 and hundreds of original Konkani hymns, including a lengthy 18-verse hymn on St Francis Xavier". Fr. Rego contributed many hymns in the Gaionancho Jhelo.

In January 2015, at the time of the canonisation of Joseph Vaz, the first Goan saint, in Colombo, Sri Lanka, Rego was credited with writing the lyrics to the hymn Jose Vaza, Amchea Bhava (Jose Vaz, Our Brother), which was put to music by Fr. Joaquim Loiola Pereira. This hymn was sung at the Mass where Pope Francis elevated the Goan missionary who worked in Ceylon to the altar and which can be heard at about 2:30:48 into this recording.

The site song-from-goa.at has a number of sheet-music versions of the work of Rego.

In March 2016, the nonagenarian Rego was credited with being one of the four - two priests, and as many musicians: Fr Ubald Fernandes, Fr Vasco Rego SJ, Schubert Cotta and Roque Lazarus - responsible for writing the lyrics of the Konkani film Enemy.

== Recognition ==
In Goa, he is credited with playing a major role in the fields of Bible translations into Konkani and liturgical translation, building a Konkani religious vocabulary, composing hymns both in lyrics and music for Konkani, and developing the world of Konkani preaching and writing in the Roman script of Konkani.

== Long-time Jesuit ==
He has been a member of the Society of Jesus, or the Jesuits since 1945, was ordained priest in Belgium in 1955, and was inspired by his theologian-teacher Fr Pierre Charles, S.J. to use the Konkani language and music in the liturgy of the people in Goa, where Konkani is a widely spoken language.

Rego was the Rector of Goa's famed Bom Jesus Basilica, where the remains of saint Francis Xavier reside, during which period many prominent global figures visited this shrine, among them being Indira Gandhi, Margaret Thatcher, Canadian Prime Minister Pierre Trudeau, President Mario Soares of Portugal, Russian and Indian cosmonauts and Pope John Paul II.

Rego is the grandson of Roque and Claudina Correia Afonso, a couple who had seven priests among their 52 grandchildren. His brother is Fernando do Rego.

== Awards ==
He was the first awardee, in 2005, of the Dalgado Konknni Akademi's Mgrs. Dalgado Puroskar, an award for serving the Konkani language for some four years.
