= Lourdino Barreto =

Indian musicologist (1938–1997)

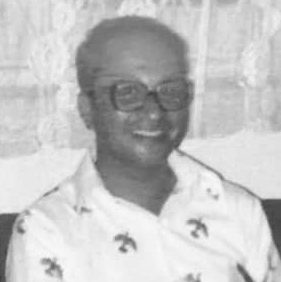
- Barreto at Panjim, Goa
- Born: 11 February 1938; Galgibaga, Goa, Portuguese India
- Died: 24 January 1997 (aged 58); Goa, India
- Education: Pontifical Institute of Sacred Music; Accademia Nazionale di Santa Cecilia

Lourdino Barreto (11 February 1938 – 24 January 1997) was an Indian musicologist and Catholic priest. He is considered one of Goa's greatest western classical musicians.

== Education ==
He studied at the Pontifical Institute of Sacred Music and the National Conservatory in Rome and graduated with distinction in Gregorian chant, composition and piano. He later earned a doctorate for his thesis titled: 'Aesthetic Indian Music as a bridge between Christian and Indian Religious Music'.

== Career ==
Back in Goa, Barreto taught music at the Seminary of Saligao-Pilerne and at the Rachol Seminary of the Archdiocese of Goa and Daman, where he trained future priests in the divine chants. He conducted the Santa Cecilia Choir of Rachol Seminary, and raised the level of music in the Seminary to a high standard.

Barreto authored more than 100 compositions, some based on Indian 'Ragas', which were performed by various orchestras and musical ensembles in major capitals of the world. In addition to some of his performances which were beamed worldwide via satellite, he gave live piano, violin and organ recitals in Italy, Switzerland, Austria, England, and the United States of America.

In February 1977, Maestro António Fortunato de Figueiredo handed over the directorship of Western Music wing of Kala Academy and the conductorship of Goa Symphony Orchestra to Lourdino Barreto. During his tenure as Director of Western Music for Goa Kala Academy, Barreto formed the Goa Philharmonic Choir.

== Death ==
Barreto died on 24 January 1997.
