= St Inez Creek =

Creek in Panjim, Goa, India

Coordinates: 15.4843°N 73.8172°E

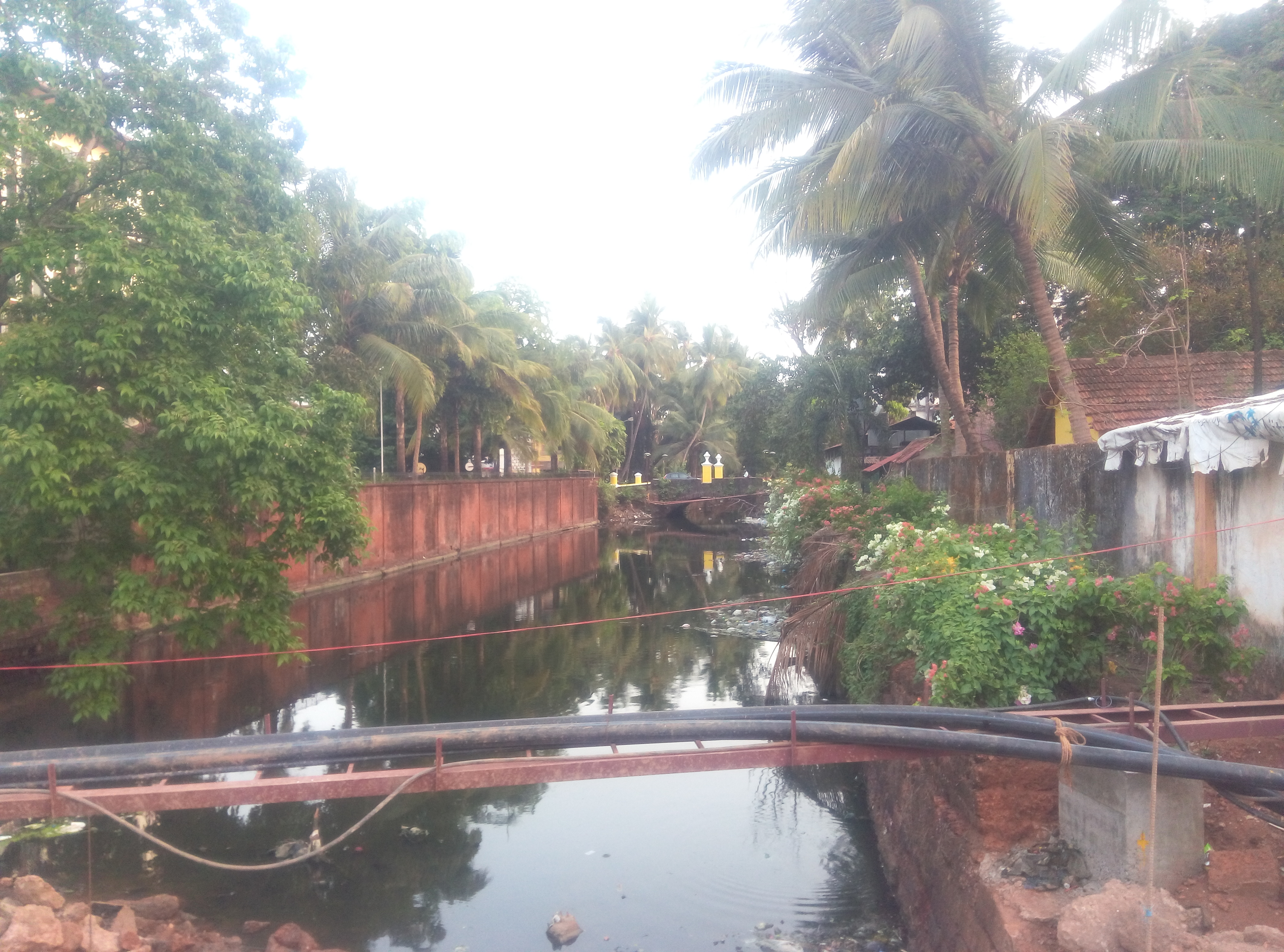
St. Inez Creek

The Santa Inês creek is a creek located in Panjim, in the coastal state of Goa, India. The creek opens up into the Mandovi River. The creek is 3.7 kilometres (2 mi) in length, with a surface area of 65,750 square metres (707,700 sq ft) and an average width of 12.6 metres (41 ft). The creek begins at the paddy fields at Altinho hill at Taleigão, Caranzalem, and the Nagahali hills of Dona Paula. Caculo Island, is located in the creek.

The creek has 12 culverts that originate from the old Goa Medical College complex leading to the Campal head, the Fire Brigade, the sewerage treatment plant at Tonca, the Tambdi Mati Cumrabhat, and the El Passo hotel. The desilting and cleaning up of the creek was taken up in May 2024.

According to a Portuguese plaque on one of the culverts, the creek dates back to 1829, although historian Percival Noronha dates it back to 1647. The original Portuguese descendents were mostly settled around a small Ward named: Boca de Vaca, in and near Santa Inês, Altinho.
