= Percival Noronha =

Indian historian (1923–2019)

Percival Noronha ComM
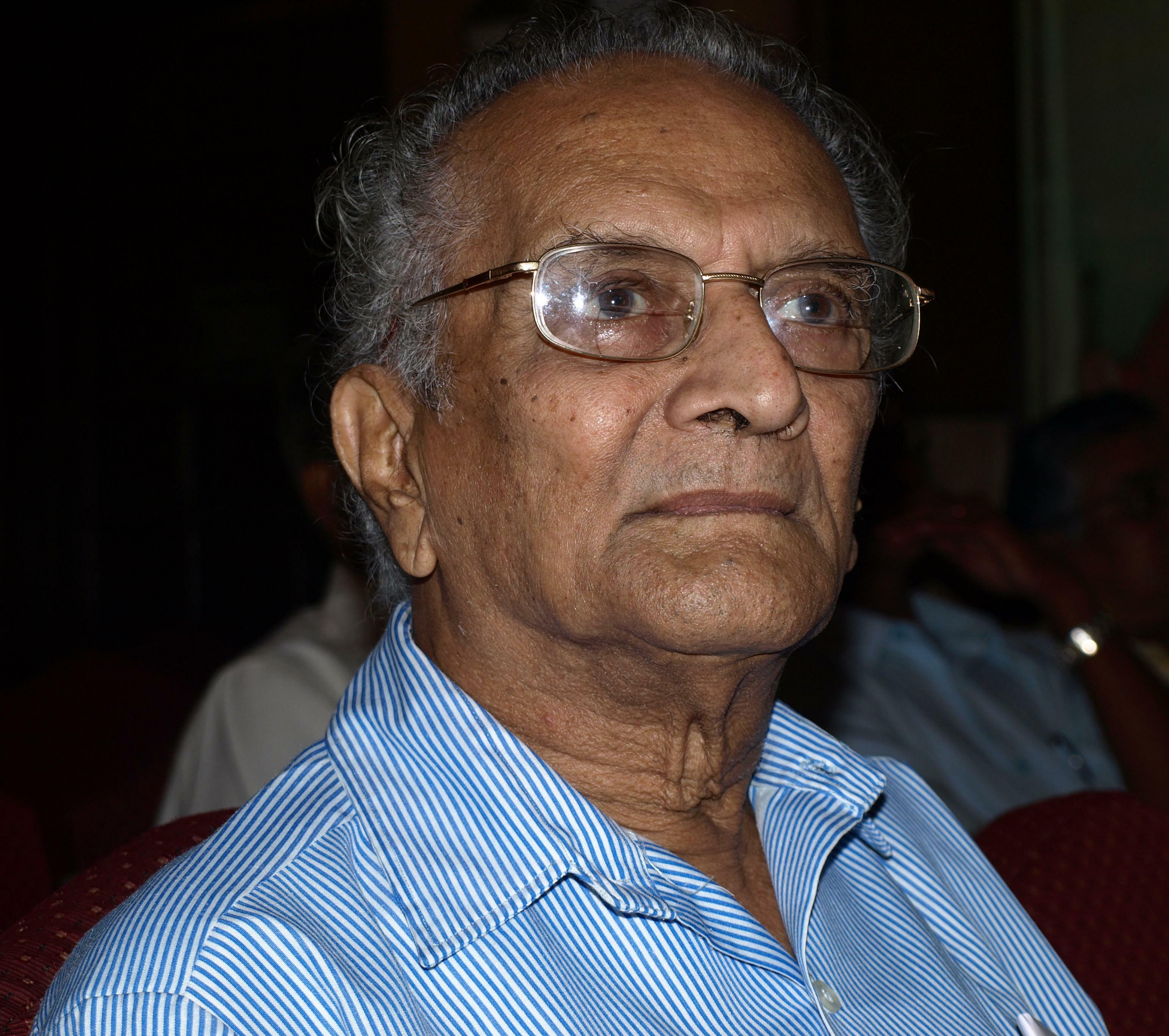
- Noronha in 2009
- Born: Percival Ivo Vital e Noronha; 26 July 1923; Margão, Goa, Portuguese India
- Died: 19 August 2019 (aged 96); Verna, Goa, India
- Occupations: Historian; conservationist; bureaucrat
- Known for: Establishing the Association of Friends of Astronomy and the Goa Carnival
- Awards: United Nations Peace Medal (1972); Ordem do Merito Comendador (2014)

Percival Ivo Vital e Noronha ComM (26 July 1923 – 19 August 2019) was an Indian historian, heritage conservationist, and bureaucrat. In 1982, he established the Association of Friends of Astronomy, the first astronomy club in Goa, India. Noronha held an officer position in the Indian administration during his tenure in the Portuguese administration (Estado da Índia).

== Early life ==
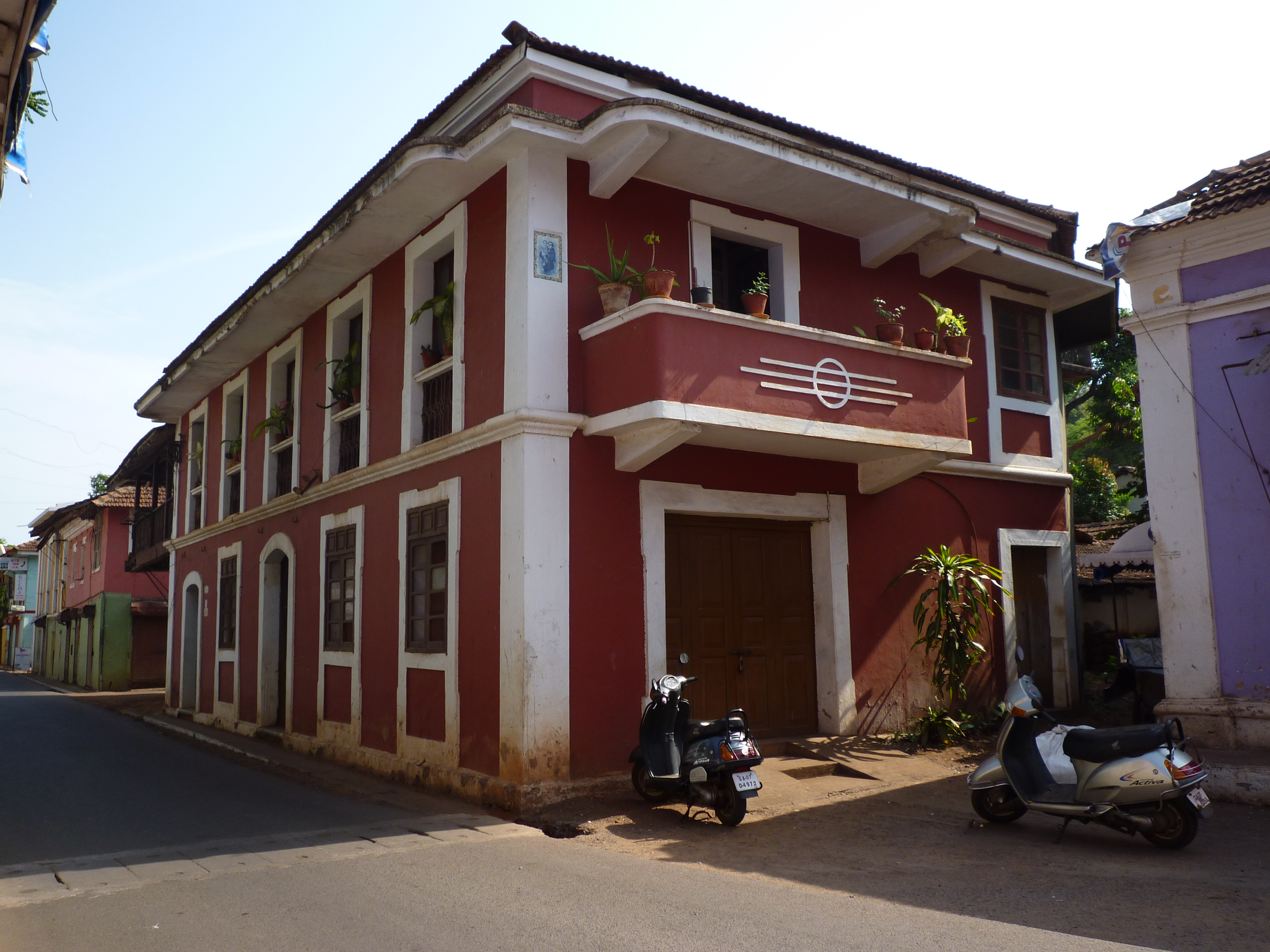
Noronha's residence and workplace, E-426, Fontainhas, in 2009.

Percival Ivo Vital e Noronha was born on 26 July 1923, in Margão, Goa, during Portuguese India, which was part of Portuguese Empire (now in India). He was born to Antonio Jose Jonas Noronha and Maria Aurora Anastasia da Silveira Vital, who were local landlords, commonly known as bhatkars. His father, Antonio, hailed from Loutolim, while his mother, Maria, hailed from Ilhas. Both his parents were based in Margão.

== Career ==
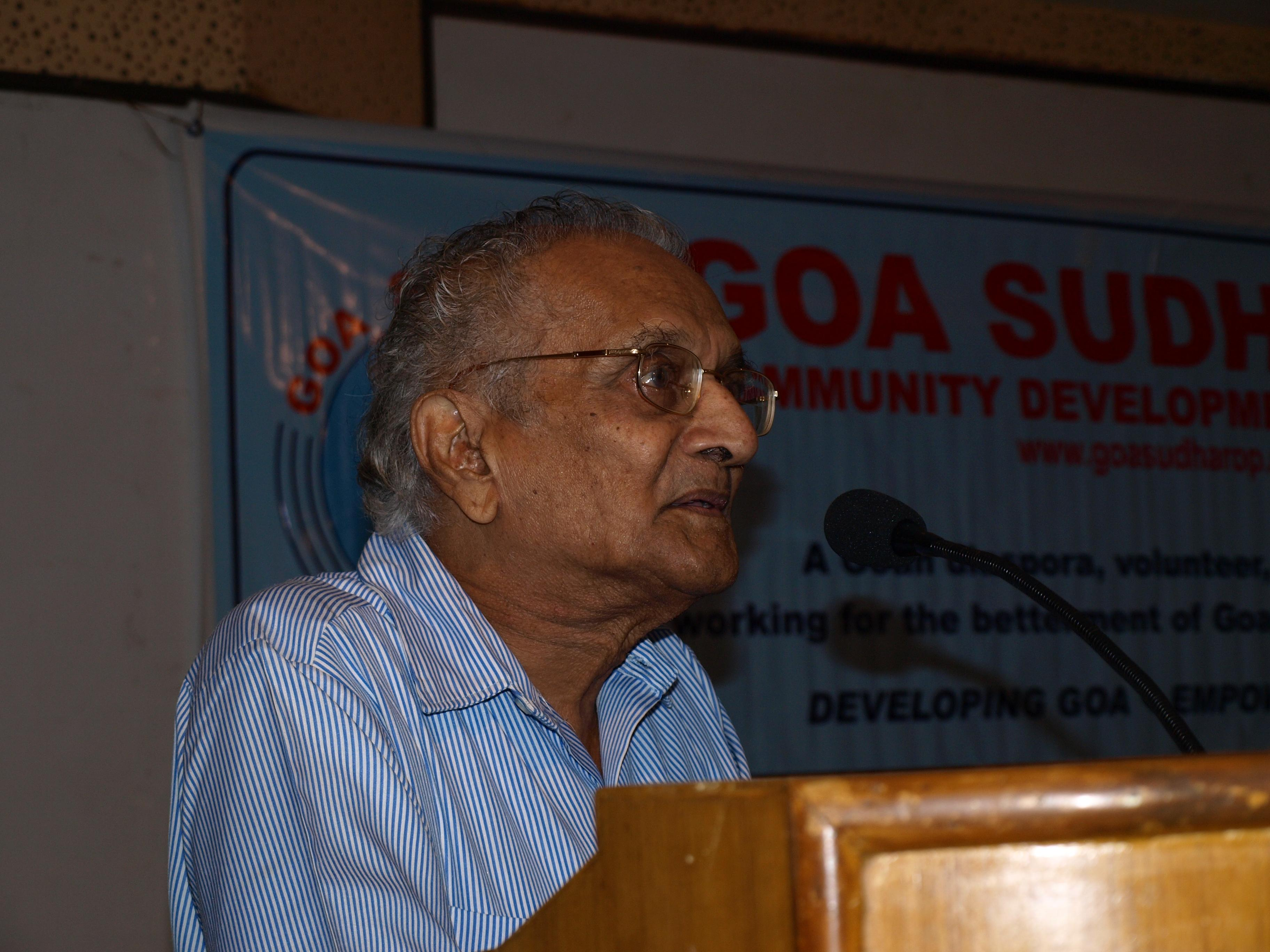
Noronha speaking at the 2009 Goa Sudharop meeting held in Goa.

Noronha contributed to the cultural development of Goa. He helped establish the Carnival floats parade, which gained recognition as a tourist attraction. Additionally, his interest in the cosmos motivated him to establish the Association of Friends of Astronomy. As part of this initiative, Noronha set up an astronomical observatory on the terrace of Junta House, equipped with a telescope. This observatory gained attention from stargazers, who gathered there to observe various celestial phenomena. Noronha also contributed to mitigate environmental issues in Goa, particularly through his efforts to address erosion. He oversaw the planting of casuarina trees along a stretch extending from the children's park in Campal to Miramar Beach in Panjim city. This initiative aimed to mitigate erosion and maintain the stability of the coastline. As of 2022, the casuarina trees, planted during Noronha's tenure, have grown in size and are still present on this stretch of road. Noronha did this work in his capacity as the Chief Information Officer and later Chief Protocol Officer.

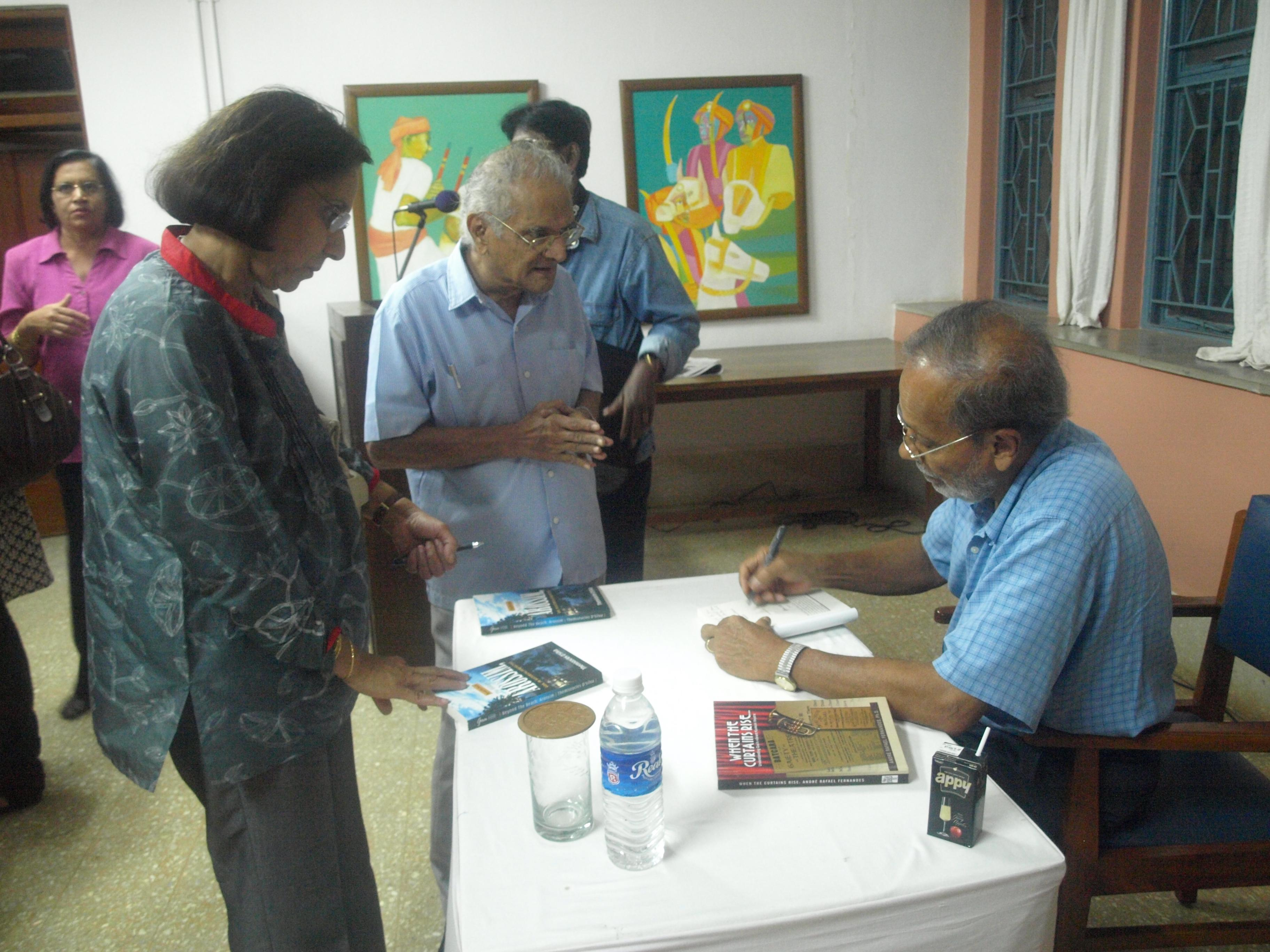
Noronha at the book launch of Arossim with historian Dr. Maria de Jesus dos Mártires Lopes in 2011.

Noronha's residence in Fontainhas, known as "Ajenor", serves as a repository of reference books and literary works throughout his lifetime. Consequently, it became a destination for people of all ages, including foreigners, Indian citizens, intellectuals, and students, who sought his guidance. His knowledge had led to him being colloquially referred to as the "encyclopedia" within academic and intellectual circles. Noronha's publication, A Walk through Old Goa, served as a guide to the World Heritage Site of Old Goa, acknowledged by the United Nations. The book encompassed historical information, encompassing various architectural styles and providing descriptions of the monuments present in the city. After leaving his public service role, he spent a major part of his retirement years in pursuing scholarly interests. His academic endeavors gained recognition across various countries, including Portugal, Spain, Italy, Germany, Japan, and Macau. Noronha's presentations, which incorporated colour slides, managed to capture the attention of historians and students in these nations. In 2009, he presented about Indo-Portuguese furniture at the inaugural Casa de Moeda festival. He held a total of seven positions in his lifetime.

== Influences ==
Noronha expressed admiration for Sanskrit scholar José Pereira, a recipient of the Padma Bhushan award. Pereira's work, Baroque India, was highly regarded by Noronha for its clear and eloquent writing style, precise geometric descriptions, and use of mathematical concepts in literature.

== Death ==
On 19 August 2019, Noronha died at a relative's residence in Verna, Goa. As per his last wishes, he designated his nephew as the beneficiary of his entire shareholdings.

== Works ==
- A Walk through Old Goa
- Baroque India

== Awards and honours ==
Noronha received several international accolades, including 17 awards. Among these honours was the United Nations Peace Medal, which was awarded to him in 1972 in recognition of his contributions to fostering peace. In 2014, he was honored with the Ordem do Merito Comendador, the highest civilian honor in Portugal, in acknowledgment of his achievements. Noronha was also awarded the Clube Militar de Macau medal, which he received for his lectures that attracted a wide audience.
