= Holy Spirit Church, Margao =

Roman Catholic chapel in Goa, India

Holy Spirit Church
- Espirito Santo Church
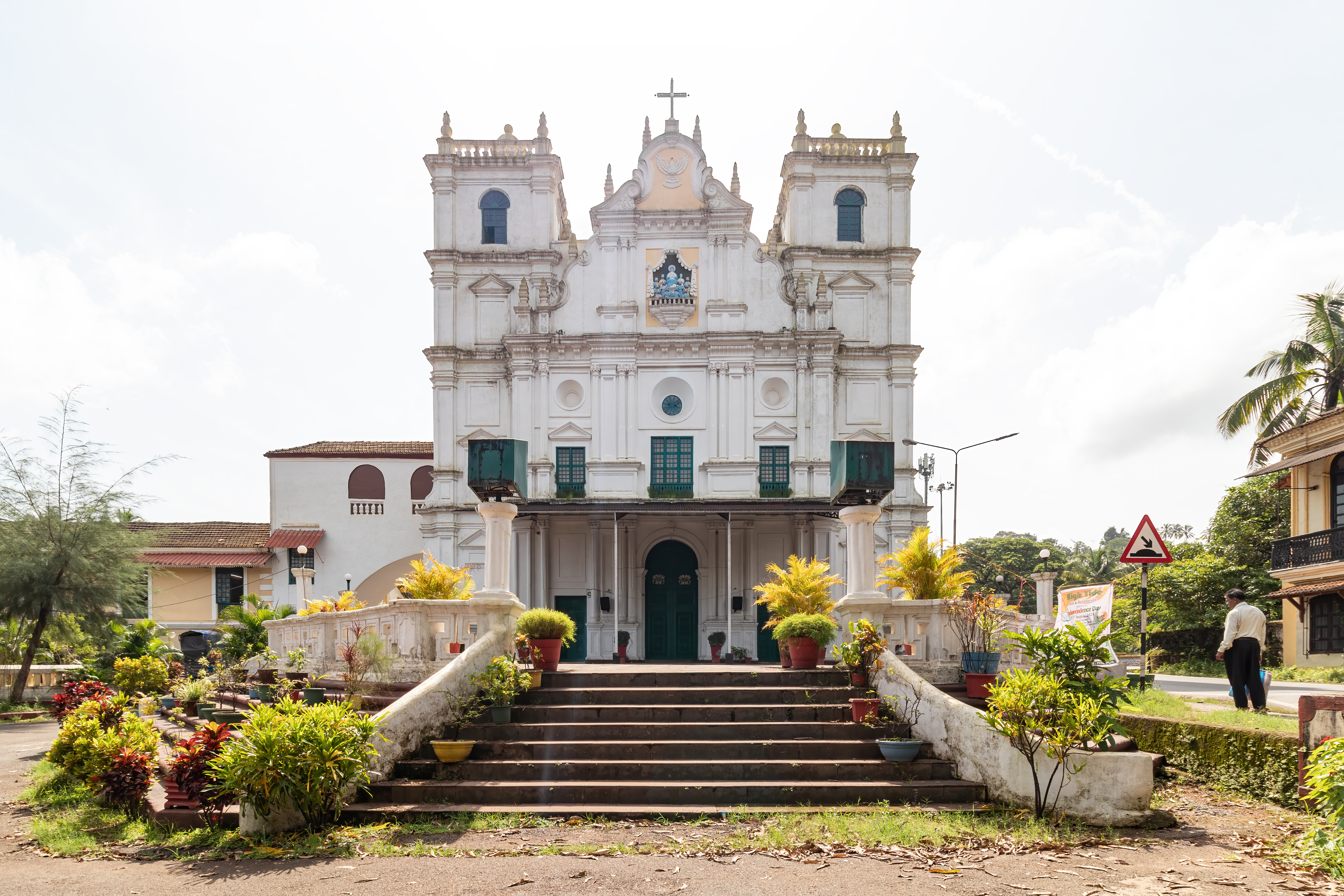
- Front façade of the Holy Spirit Church
- Holy Spirit Church
- 15.281683°N 73.959325°E
- Location: Margao, Goa
- Country: India
- Denomination: Roman Catholic

History
- Status: Church
- Founded: 1564; 462 years ago
- Dedication: Holy Spirit

Architecture
- Style: Baroque

Administration
- Archdiocese: Archdiocese of Goa and Daman

Holy Spirit Church, also referred to as the Espirito Santo Church, is a church located in Margao, Goa. Built between 1564 and 1565, it was the second church to be constructed in the Salcete region.

== History and architecture ==
The Holy Spirit Church was erected in 1564–1565. It is widely believed that the inaugural mass was held on the Saturday prior to the second Sunday of Easter. Historically recognized as one of the most affluent churches in Salcete, it housed an extensive collection of rare, antique church art. The structure incorporates architectural and religious features such as bell towers, pulpits, a crucifix, a modern altar, and various other altars. Furthermore, it featured a grand eighteenth-century pipe organ imported from Germany, which possessed a sound range of half a kilometer.

Until the end of the 18th century, the floor of the church functioned as a burial ground. According to Dr. Jose Pereira, to mask the scent of decaying bodies emanating from the earth, rose water was commonly applied, and fragrant leaves from cinnamon and champak trees were scattered across the floor.

Following the arrival of Christianity in the region, Margao yielded over 450 diocesan priests and five bishops, making it the highest contributor in all of Goa. The history of the church and its surrounding areas was detailed by journalist and historian Valmiki Faleiro in his book Soaring Spirit- 450 years of Margao's Espirito Santo Church (1565-2015), which was written to coincide with the church's 450th anniversary.

== Associated institutions ==
A college and a hospital were historically situated in the vicinity of the church.

=== Colegio do Espirito Santo ===
Initially called the Colegio de Todos os Santos, the Colegio do Espirito Santo was the precursor to the modern-day Rachol Seminary. It was the fourth educational institution established by the Jesuits in their Indian province, an area that spanned from Japan in the far east to the Cape of Good Hope in South Africa, with its headquarters in Goa. The college offered religious training for prospective priests, alongside general education for the public. Subjects taught included Latin, Portuguese, mathematics, history, rhetoric, natural sciences, music, jurisprudence, and optional courses in theology and philosophy.

=== Hospital do Padre Paulo Camerte ===
Located adjacent to the college, the Hospital do Padre Paulo Camerte was a medical facility equipped with 100 beds. It provided medical care to individuals from the local Salcete area as well as from the territories of Bijapur.

== Largo da Igreja ==
The area surrounding the church is known as the Largo da Igreja, or church square. This square accommodates over forty residences, the Camara Municipal de Salcete (the municipal senate), a jail called the caldeira, and the Cidas Almas Chapel.

Also located in the square was the Mercado de Vasco da Gama, which served as the primary market for the entire Salcete taluka. Unlike most Goan village markets that operated once a week, this market hosted fairs on two days: Sundays and Thursdays. However, the introduction of a railway line in 1887 led to the market's eventual decline.

On 21 September 1890, the square was the site of a violent conflict during municipal elections. Portuguese interference in the local voting process resulted in the deaths of seventeen people. This tragic event inspired the creation of the mando song "Setembrache ekvisaveru".

== Traditions ==
The Church celebrates the Feast of Our Lady of the Immaculate Conception on 8 December.

== Equinox phenomenon ==
On the Equinox days, the rays of the Sun fall perfectly onto the image of the Holy Spirit through an oculus on the front façade of the church. Windows at the sides similarly illuminate statues of Jesus and Mary, mother of Jesus. Being an astronomical phenomenon, members of the Association of Friends of Astronomy visit the church on this day.
