= Rui Gomes Pereira =

Indian lawyer and historian (1924–1989)

- Born: 27 November 1924; Divar, Portuguese Goa
- Died: 27 December 1989 (aged 65); Goa, India
- Occupations: Lawyer, historian
- Known for: Founder of Sharada Mandir School
- Notable work: Goa: Hindu Temples and Deities

Rui Gomes Pereira (27 November 1924 – 27 December 1989) was an Indian lawyer and historian.

== Early life ==
Rui Gomes Pereira was born on 27 November 1924 to Antonio Xavier Gomes Pereira and Maria Laura Julia Cabral Gomes Pereira in Divar. He had two sisters, Letecia Menezes and Margarita Alvares, and one brother, Custodio Manuel Gomes Pereira. Rui was the youngest sibling.

The family's original surname was Gomes. They originally lived in the Guirdolim village of Chandor. The family moved to Chorao due to a plague in the 17th century. After another plague struck, the family again divided itself into two branches, with one in Siolim and the other in Divar. When Custodio Vincente Pereira (the uncle of Rui Gomes Pereira's great grandfather) died childless, the family adopted the surname of Pereira.

== Career ==
=== Law ===
Gomes Pereira completed his education in Civil Law and then began practicing as a lawyer with his friend Shridhar Tamba. Due to the lack of law colleges in Goa at the time, Tamba and Gomes Pereira were trained by the latter's father, Antonio Xavier Gomes Pereira. They answered the Exam Estado which permitted them to handle Civil Law cases. Their joint practice was called Procural. Gomes Pereira himself later guided another lawyer, Manohar S Usgaonkar, to answer the exam.

=== History ===
In 1974, Gomes Pereira was diagnosed with thyroid cancer, which seriously affected his leg, due to which he had to stop practicing law. This is when he started writing about history, writing his first book about Goa's temples, Goa Hindu Temples and Deities. The book documents the list of temples in both the Portuguese era and before the Portuguese. He was well-versed with the topic since he had fought legal battles regarding temple and church properties in Goa. The book further discusses the mahajans and gaonkari systems, going on to describe how the Portuguese attempted to destroy these traditions. it also describes the destruction of temples and religious conversions by the Portuguese.

Gomes Pereira's second book, Gaonkari: The Old Village Associations, talks about the primitive colonies of Goa, including their work, membership, possessions, farming, the institutional nature of these villages, the threats they faced, and their role in delivering justice, policy, and administration.

His third book, Questos de India, is yet to be published. It describes the social transitions in Goa during the Portuguese era from 1510 to 1961. He finished the work a few weeks before his death in 1989.

=== Education ===
Gomes Pereira and his relative, Albert Costa, together started the Sharada Mandir School in Panaji. It is regarded as one of the first schools in the city.

== Personal life ==
Rui Gomes Pereira had a son, Antonio Xavier.

== Death ==
Gomes Pereira had thyroid cancer and died on 27 December 1989.
