= Sharada Mandir School =

Location
- Jack de Sequeira Road, Miramar; Panaji, Goa, 403001; India; 15.480°N 73.809°E

Information
- Type: Private school
- Motto: May You Meet Together, Talk Together and May Your Minds Comprehend Alike
- Established: 20 April 1969; 57 years ago
- Founders: Vassanta Sinai Piligaocar; Miguel D'Costa; Rui Gomes Pereira; Alvaro Pinto Furtado
- School board: Council for the Indian School Certificate Examinations
- Principal: School Principal
- Founder Headmistress: Lucy da Costa
- Staff: 17 administrative 37 support
- Faculty: 131 teaching
- Grades: Nursery to 12th
- Gender: Co-educational
- Language: English
- Houses: Red, Blue, Green, Yellow
- Nickname: SMS; Sharadas
- Website: www.sharadamandir.edu.in

Sharada Mandir School is a private co-educational school in Miramar, Panaji, Goa, India, serving students from nursery to higher secondary level. It was established in 1966 and affiliated to the Council for the Indian School Certificate Examinations.

The school follows the Indian Certificate of Secondary Education (ICSE) up till Std.10 and is now affiliated with the Indian School Certificate for Std. 12. In the late 2000s, the school was acquired by the industrialist Dattaraj V. Salgaocar (son of Vasudev Salgaocar), who now heads the Board of Trustees as well as the Managing Committee along with his wife Dipti (daughter of Dhirubhai Ambani) and their daughter Isheta (sister-in-law of Nirav Modi).

The school has a wide range of equipment and facilities, ranging from playgrounds, sand pits and yoga rooms to auditoriums and special-education centres.
