= Valmiki Faleiro =

Indian writer (1956–2023)

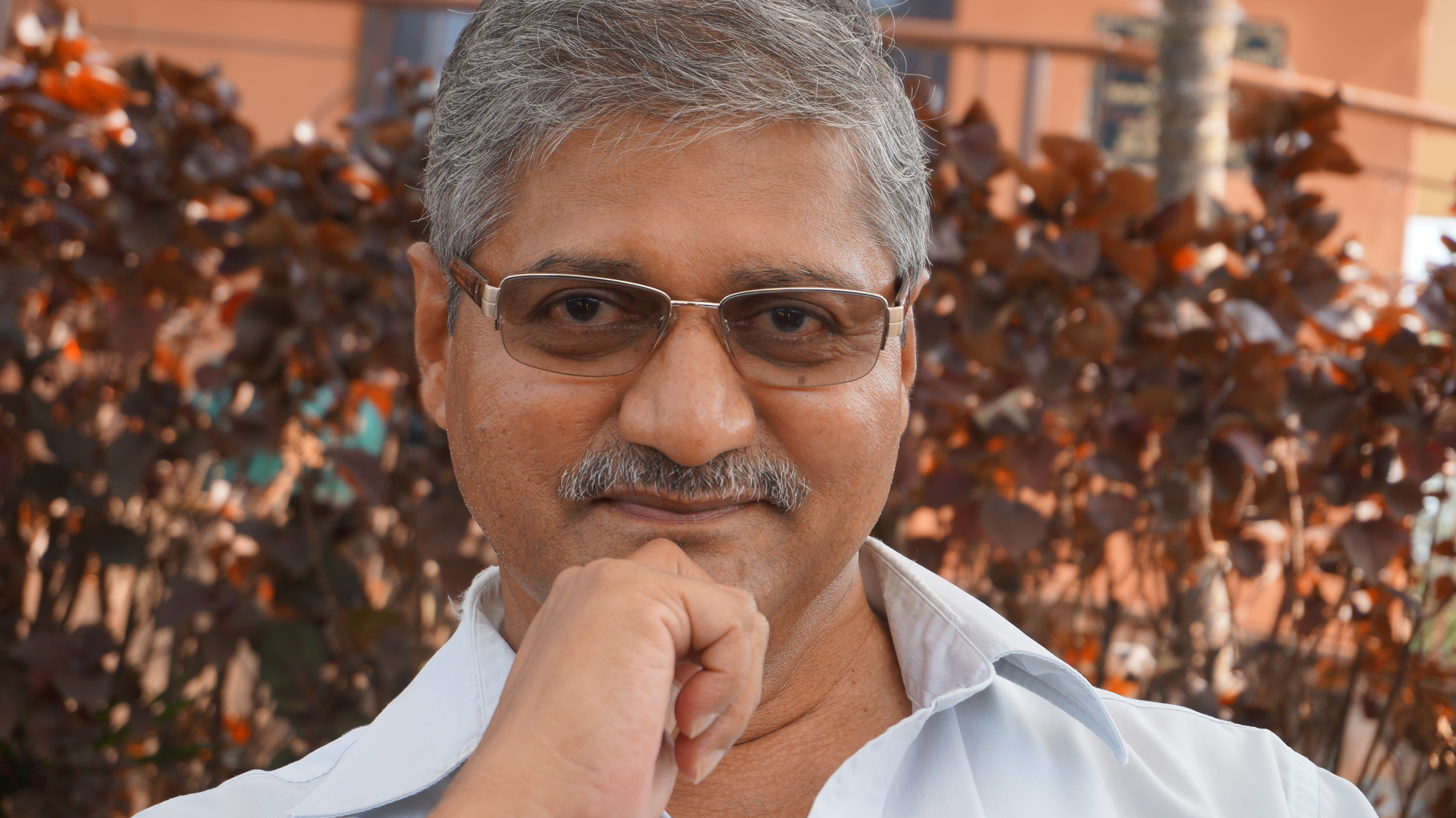
- Faleiro in 2015
- Born: Socrates Valmiki Faleiro; 6 January 1956; Margão, Portuguese Goa
- Died: 5 October 2023 (aged 67); Margao, Goa, India
- Occupations: Lawyer, writer
- Notable work: Goa, 1961: The Complete Story of Nationalism and Integration (2023)

Socrates Valmiki Faleiro (6 January 1956 – 5 October 2023) was an Indian researcher, writer, journalist, and former president of the Margao Municipal Council in Goa. He practiced law in Margao and wrote columns for local newspapers for over three decades.

== Early life ==
Socrates Valmiki Faleiro was born on 6 January 1956 in Margao, Goa to Jose Manuel Faleiro, an officer in the Indian Army, and Olga de Sa. He was named after the Greek thinker, Socrates, and the Indian poet from legend, Valmiki. Faleiro began his education under the Portuguese system up to the Segundo (secondary) class at Agostinho Vicente Lourenco School. He continued his schooling at Loyola High School and Holy Spirit Institute in Margao. He then completed his higher education at Vidya Vikas Mandal's Commerce College in Margao.

== Career ==
=== Journalism ===
Faleiro was a journalist from 1975 to 1983. He reported about Goa for various national publications. He also contributed to local dailies and journals.

=== As a corporator ===
From 1985 to 1987, Faleiro was the president of the Margao Municipal Council.

=== Real estate ===
Faleiro ran a land development business which he quit in 2005.

=== Writing ===
Faleiro began writing in 2005. His first book, Patriotism in Action (2010), highlighted Goa's contributions to India's defense services. He also authored Soaring Spirit: 450 Years of Margao's Espirito Santo Church (1565-2015), exploring the extensive history of the Holy Spirit Church, Margao. His extensively researched work, Goa, 1961: The Complete Story of Nationalism and Integration, provided a comprehensive account of the Goa liberation movement and Operation Vijay.

== Death ==
Faleiro died on 5 October 2023, at his residence in Margao from a heart attack.

== Works ==
- Faleiro, Valmiki (2010). Patriotism in action: Goans in India's defence services (Goa,1556; First Edition (1 January 2010) ed.). ISBN 978-93-80739-06-9.
- Faleiro, Valmiki (2015). Soaring Spirit: 450 Years of Margao's Espr̕ito Santo Church (1565-2015). Goa 1556. ISBN 978-93-80739-90-8.
- Faleiro, Valmiki (24 July 2023). Goa, 1961: The Complete Story of Nationalism and Integration. Penguin Random House India Private Limited. ISBN 978-93-5708-175-7.
