= Our Lady of the Immaculate Conception Church, Goa =

Cathedral in Goa, India

Coordinates: 15°29′54″N 73°49′46″E

Church of Our Lady of the Immaculate Conception
- Igreja de Nossa Senhora da Imaculada Conceição (Portuguese)
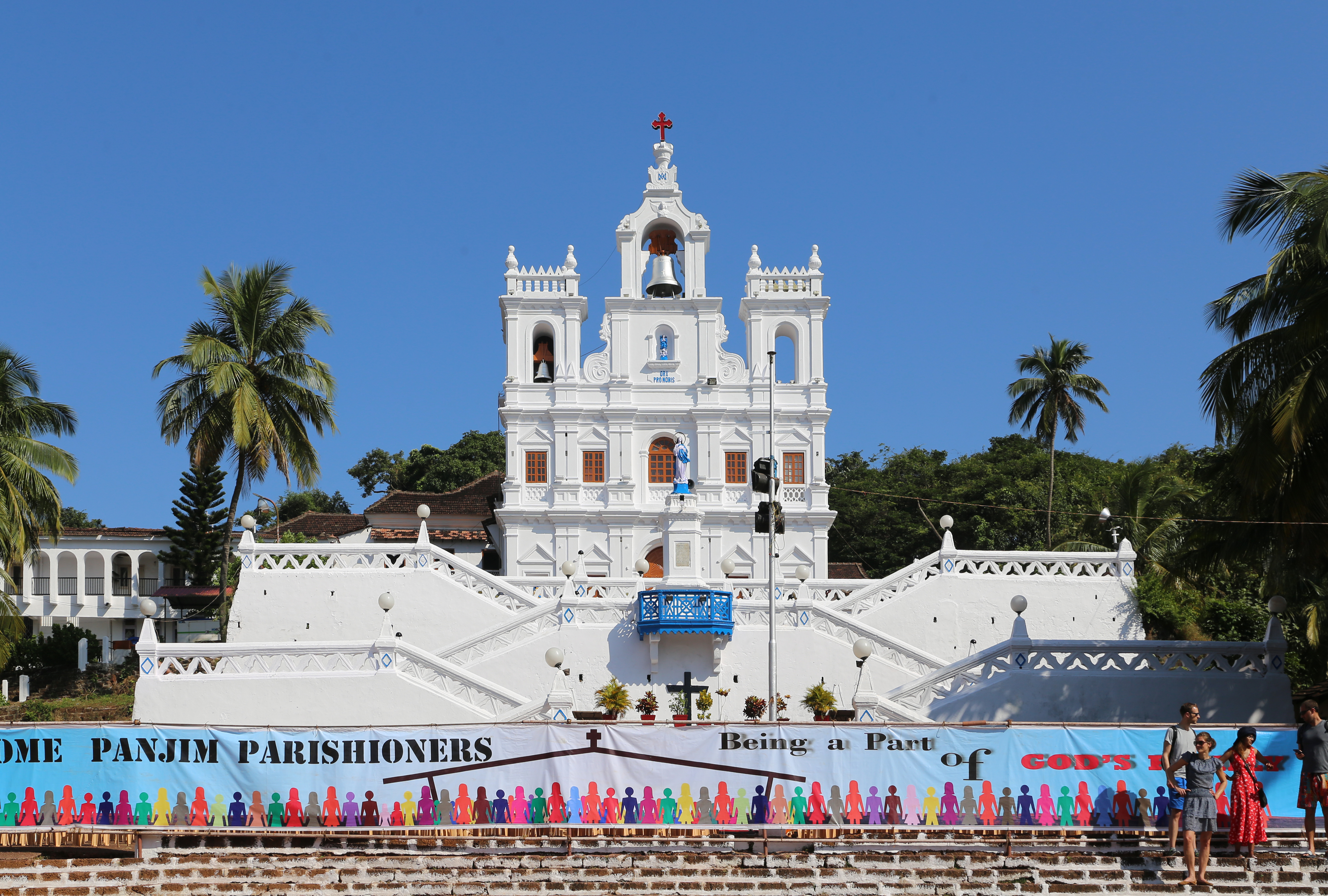
- Interactive map of the Church of Our Lady of the Immaculate Conception area

General information
- Architectural style: Baroque
- Location: Panaji, Goa, India
- Completed: Chapel in 1541, Church in 1609; 417 years ago

The Our Lady of the Immaculate Conception Church (Portuguese: Igreja de Nossa Senhora da Imaculada Conceição) is located in Panjim, Goa, India. The Church conducts Mass every day in English, Konkani, and Portuguese.

The colonial Portuguese Baroque style church was first built in 1541 as a chapel on a hill side overlooking the city of Panaji .It was eventually replaced by a larger church in the 1600s as part of Portuguese Goa's religious expansion. This church houses the ancient bell that was removed from the Augustinian ruins of the Church of Our Lady of Grace (Portuguese: Nossa Senhora da Graça) in the once famed city of Old Goa. This bell is considered to be the second largest of its kind in Goa, surpassed only by the Golden Bell which resides in the Sé Cathedral in Old Goa.

== History ==
A chapel was first built in Panaji in 1541, to serve the religious needs of Portuguese sailors at their first port of call in colonial Portuguese India. At that time the settlement was a small fishing village. It became a Parish in 1600, and in 1609 the small chapel was replaced by the present day large church to minister to the residents and sailors. In the 18th century the stairways, in a symmetrical zigzag form, were added to the church. The second largest church bell in Goa was installed in a bell tower in 1871. It was formerly at the Augustinian Monastery on Holy Hill, and was retrieved after the monastery was damaged.

== Location ==
The church is located in Panjim and sits atop a hill facing the square below. The city's municipal garden (Garcia da orta) lies to its southeast and can be seen from atop the hill. The site was once the location of a colonial port landing where ships sailing from Lisbon made first call, and where sailors disembarked before proceeding further inland to Ela (now Old Goa) – the capital of Goa until the 19th century. A laterite stone walkway with zigzag stairs ascend the church while lines of thin and tall palm trees form part of the scene. The church is considered an iconic location, not least because of its appearance in several Bollywood films; in turn, this has resulted in many tourists gathering in the area, which often causes traffic snarls and a nuisance to local residents.

== Architecture ==
=== Exterior ===
The exterior facade of the church, rich with Portuguese Baroque style architectural elements is painted a bright white to signify the Immaculate virgin, Mary. The tall belfry centered atop the facade houses the bell from the Augustinian Monastery. The imposing facade is distinctive with its two towers and centrally placed taller belfry. It can be seen from a great distance and is often known as the ‘crown’ of Panjim. The church is laid out in the orthodox cruciform fashion with a nave and a transept. The steps are possibly remodeled after the Sanctuary of Our Lady of Peneda [pt] and the Bom Jesus do Monte church in Braga, Portugal.

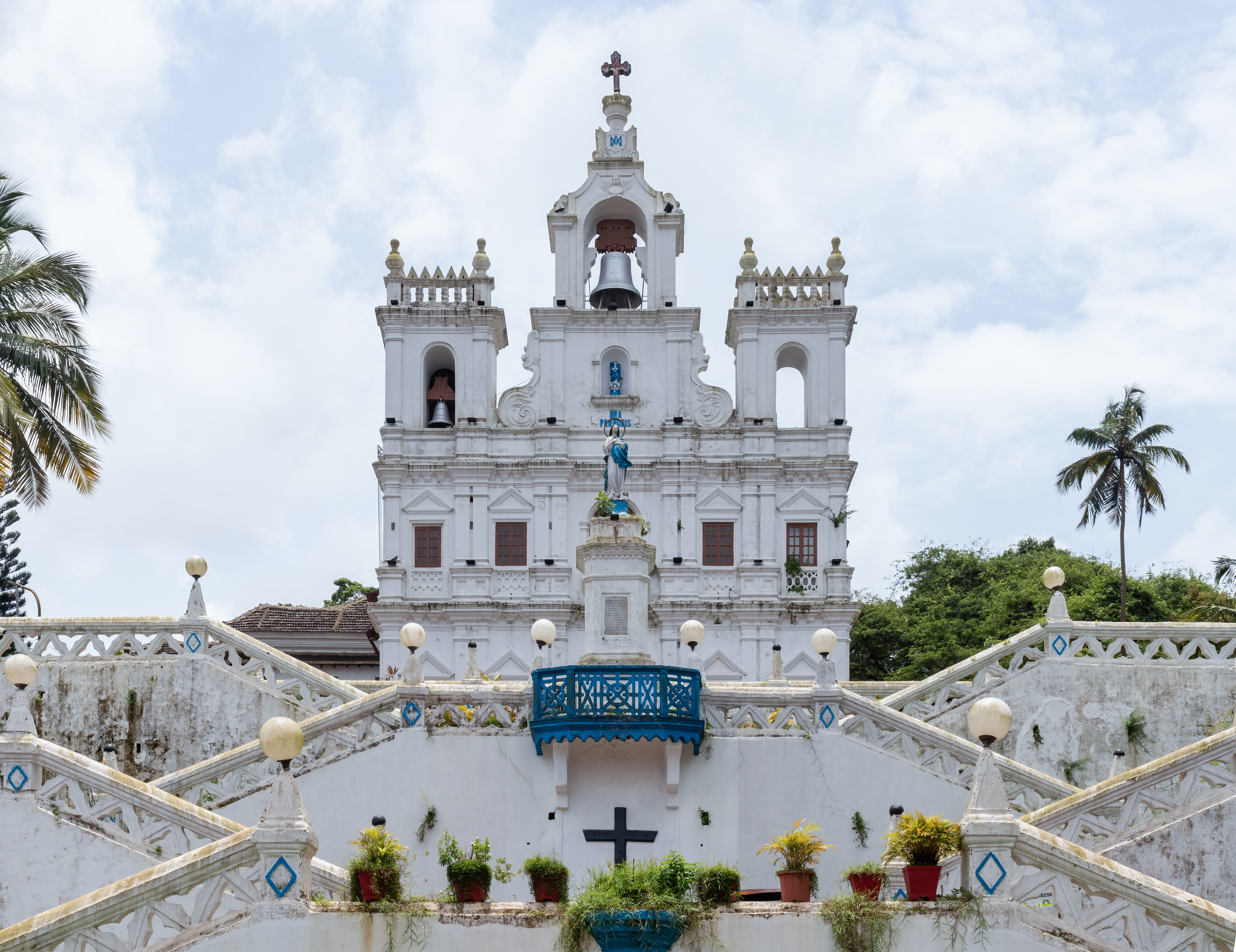

=== Interior ===
The interior of the church is not extravagant, but is colorful. The main altar, which has an elegant decor, is dedicated to Mother Mary. There are two other intricately carved, gold plated and decorated altars on either side of the main altar. The one to the left is of Jesus's Crucifixion and the one to the right is of the Our Lady of the Rosary. These two altars are flanked by marble statues of St Peter and St Paul.

On festive occasions, the wooden structural elements, which form part of the vaulted ceiling above the altars, are festooned with twines of blue and white flowers, an indication of the external color scheme of the church.

There is also a chapel of St. Francis Xavier, located in the south transept to the right side of the main altar; the statues in this chapel are enclosed in a glass case.

== Festival ==
During the Festival of Our Lady of the Immaculate Conception, held every year on 8 December, the church is colourfully illuminated. A fair is also part of this festival.

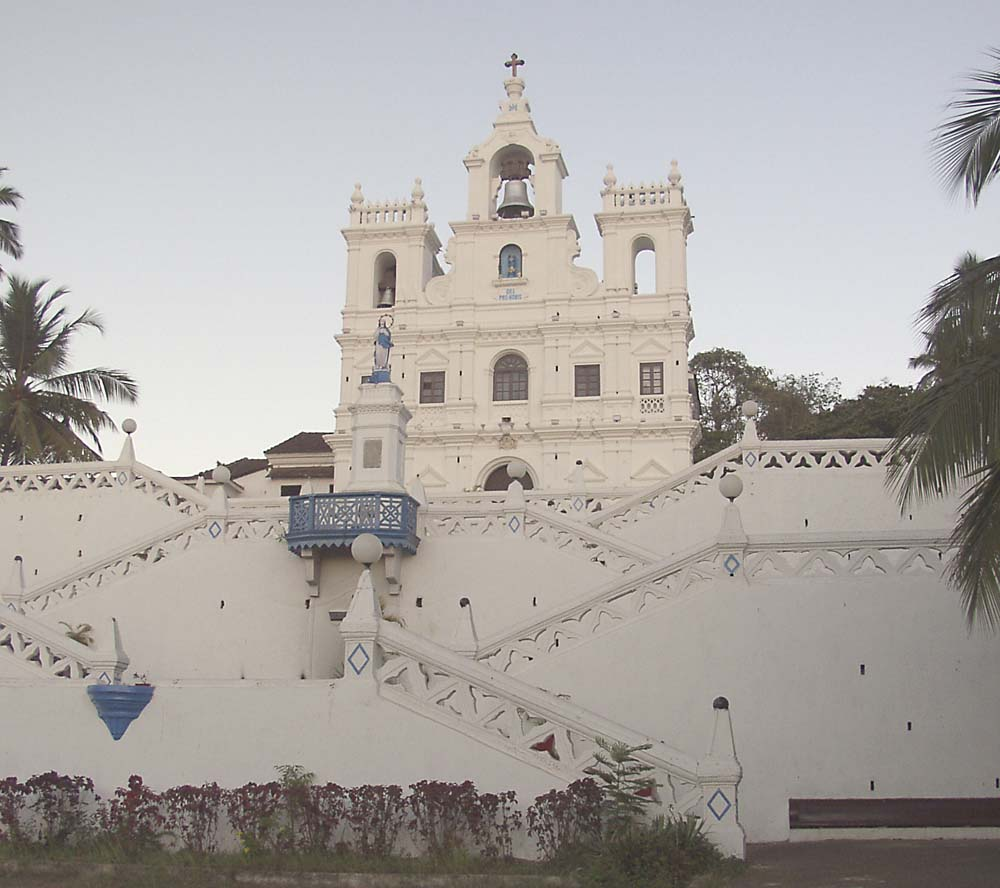
Statue of Virgin Mary

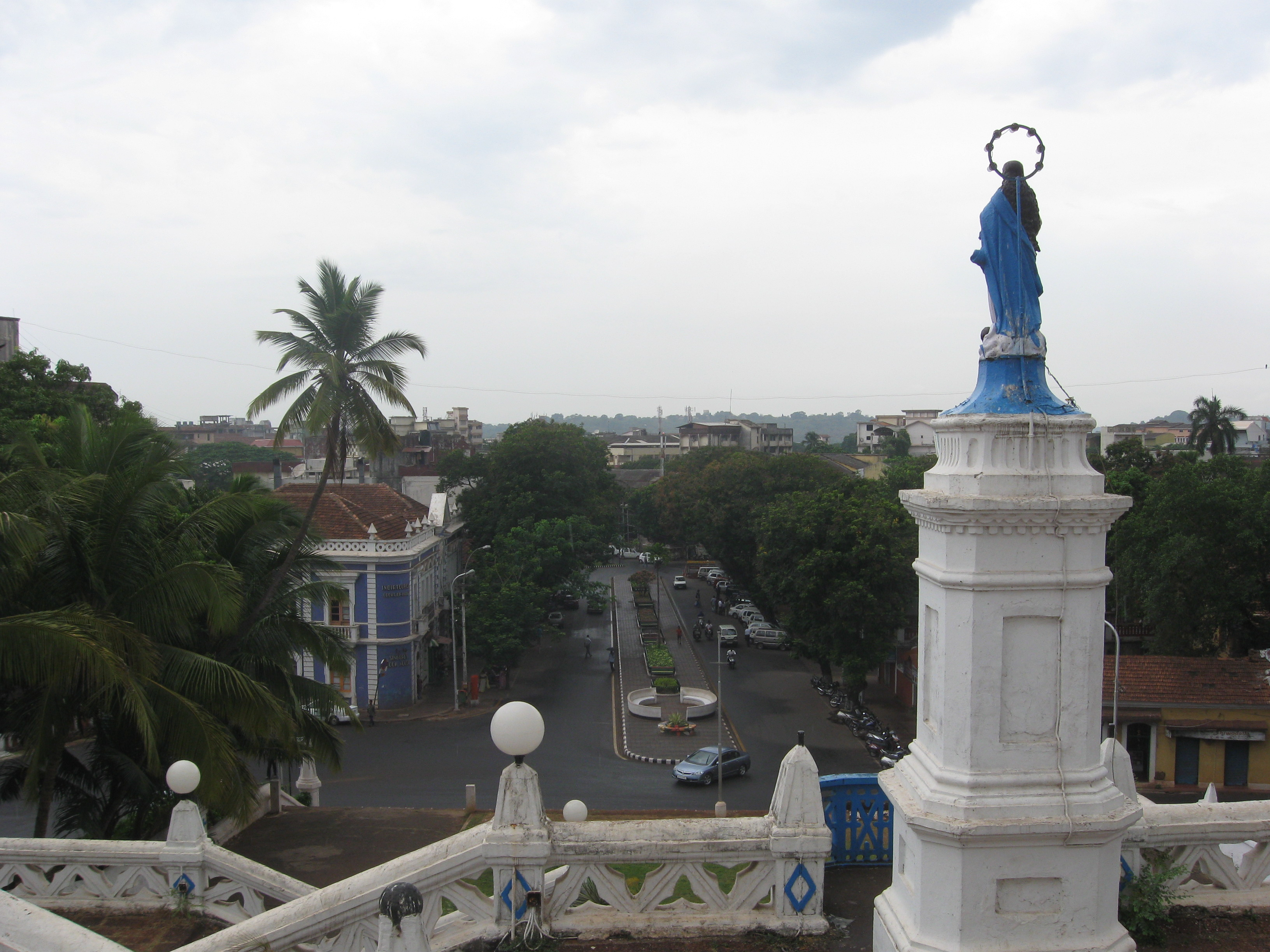
The square below

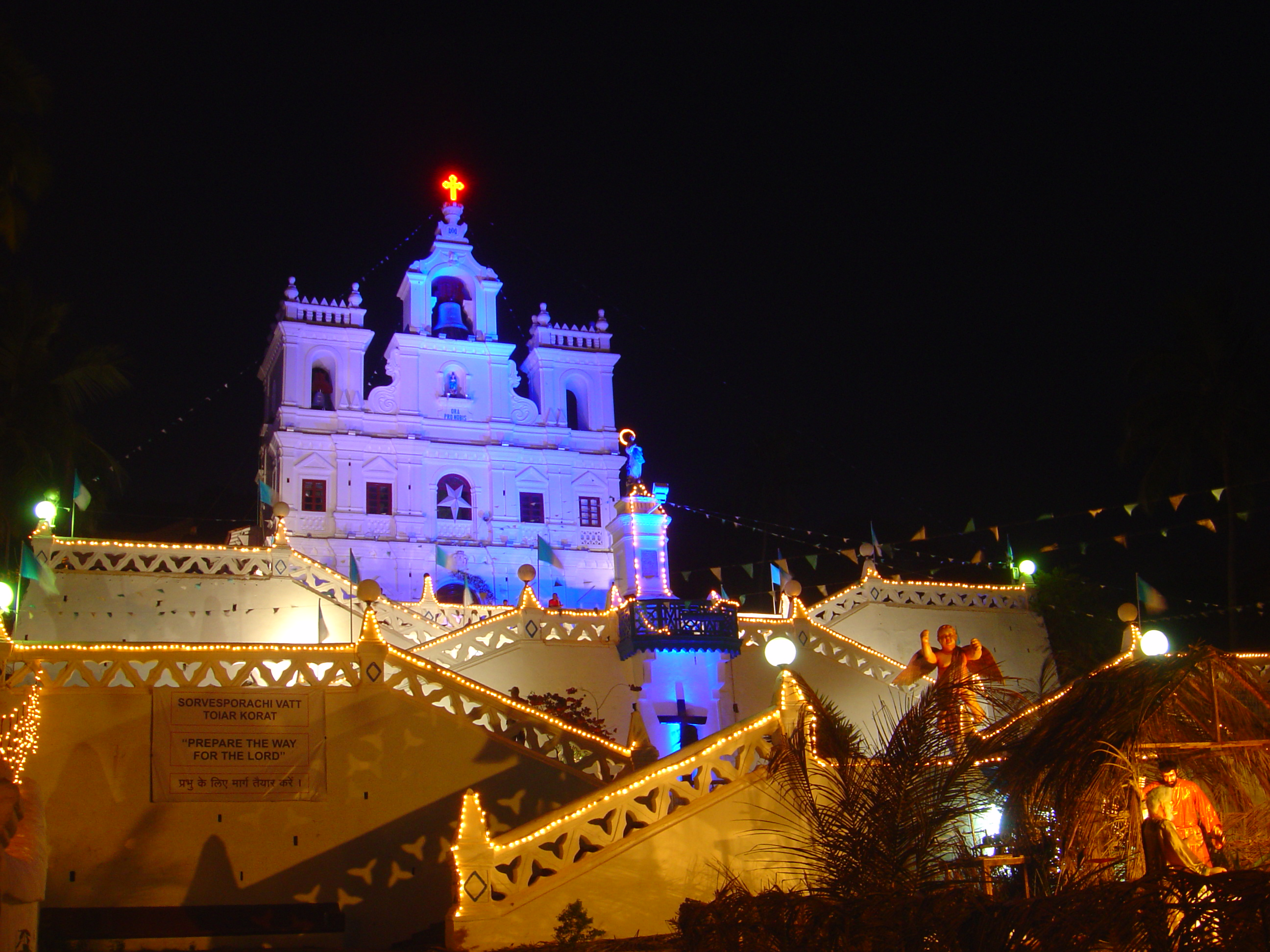
The church at night
