= Association of Friends of Astronomy =

Astronomical society in Goa, India

- Abbreviation: AFA
- Formation: 1982
- Founder: Percival Noronha
- Type: Nonprofit organization
- Purpose: Popularize astronomical knowledge
- Location: Goa, India
- Website: afagoa

Association of Friends of Astronomy, known by the abbreviation AFA, is a society of amateur astronomers and other interested individuals, based in Goa, India.

== History ==
The Association of Friends of Astronomy began under the guidance of Percival Noronha in 1982. It has a public astronomical observatory that is set up on the terrace of Junta House, then the tallest building in Panjim city. Later, the Department of Science, Technology and Environment, Government of Goa, began funding the AFA, funding telescopes. In 2022, the observatory was renovated.

In 2023, the AFA inaugurated a completely automated observation dome, the first in Goa, at the observatory in Panjim. It is equipped with a 14-inch automated Celestron telescope, allowing people to see the planets up to Uranus and Neptune. It was donated by the Economic Development Corporation of Goa as a corporate social responsibility initiative. The Panjim observatory is said to be the first in India. The telescope was donated by members of the Goan diaspora based in California through the organisation, Goa Sudharop.

== Activities ==
Since 2009, the AFA organises events across Goa during Global Astronomy Month. They also organise programmes for World Book Day, Earth Day, Astronomy Day and World Heritage Day. Besides Panjim, where the observatory is located, they conduct programmes in Vasco da Gama, Mapusa, Porvorim, Margao and Canacona. They also conduct activities in rural areas, being the first in India to do so, having conducted activities in villages like Morjim, Borim and Sanquelim.

AFA also has an Astro Kids Club that meets every Saturday and an Astro Photography Club. They also organise an annual Astro Film Festival and Documentary Festival. They also regularly organise programmes in schools and even conduct workshops and astronomy observations at beaches.

AFA's publications include Astronomy Simplified, a Concise Info Booklet and their periodical, Via Lactea, which translates to Milky Way in Latin.

AFA worked with the Directorate of Education in Goa and was successful in introducing Astronomy as a subject in schools for classes 9 and 10.

== Membership ==
As of April 2023, the AFA had about 2000 student members and 460 life members. Their membership fee is ₹500 per year for adults and ₹500 for a lifetime membership for students.

== See also ==
- List of astronomical societies
