= Fontainhas (quarter) =

Bairro das Fontainhas Fontainhas Quarter
- Neighbourhood
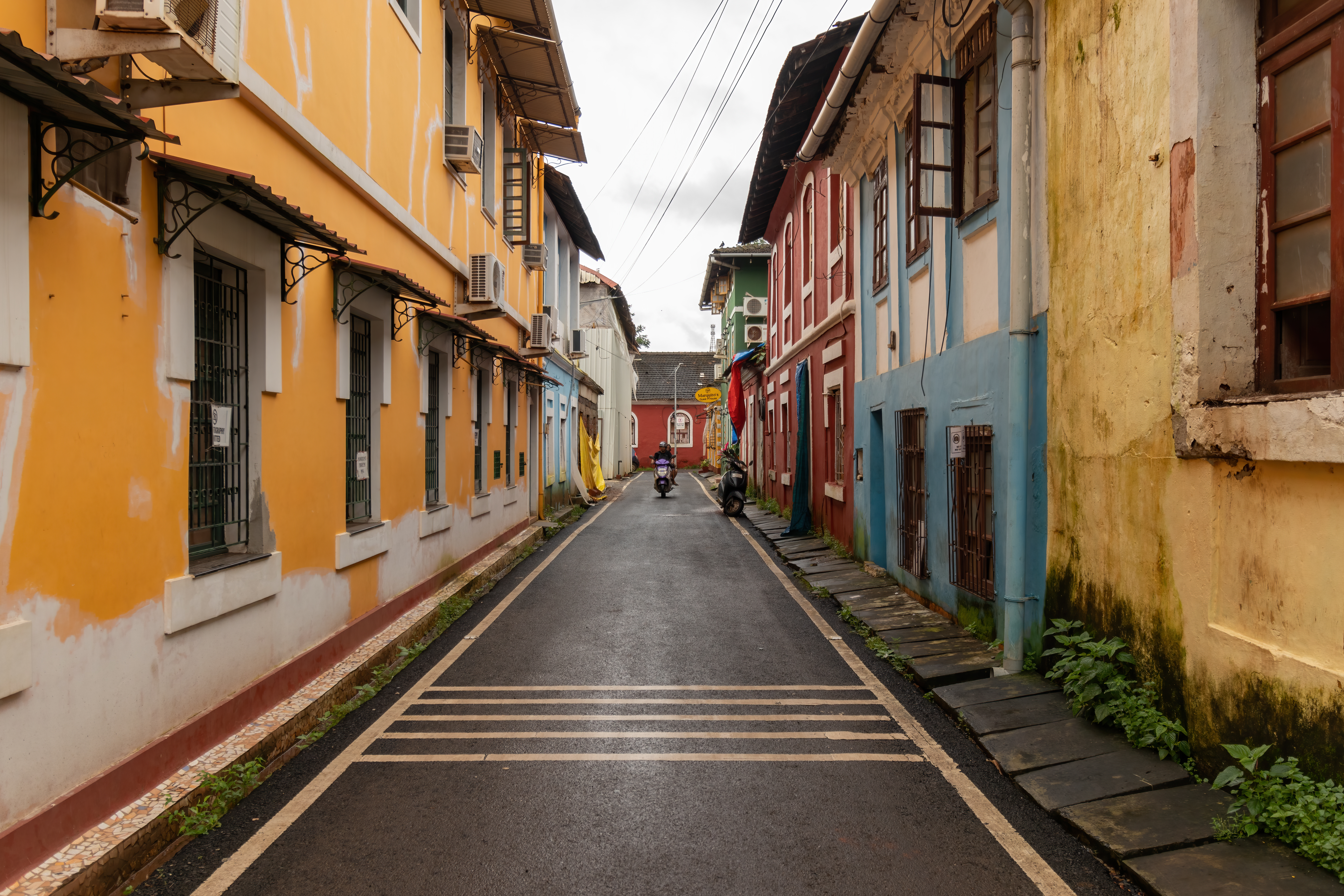
- Heritage houses in a lane, near the Old Vasco da Gama residence
- Interactive map of Bairro das Fontainhas
- Coordinates: 15.496°N 73.831°E
- Country: India
- State: Goa
- District: North Goa
- Sub-Division: Ilhas de Goa
- Established: 1770
- Founder: Antonio Joao de Sequeira
- Elevation: 8 m (26 ft)

Population (2011)
  - Total: approx 3,500
- Demonym: -

Languages
  - Official: Konkani
  - Also Spoken (understood): English; Portuguese
  - Historical: Portuguese

Religions
  - Dominant: Roman Catholicism
- Time zone: UTC+5:30 (IST)
- Postcode: 403 517
- Telephone code: 0832 2xx
- Vehicle registration: GA
- Website: goa.gov.in

Fontainhas (Portuguese: Bairro das Fontainhas) is an old Latin quarter in Panjim, capital city of the state of Goa, India. It maintains its Portuguese influence, particularly through its architecture, which includes narrow and picturesque winding streets like those found in many European cities, old villas and buildings with projecting balconies painted in the traditional tones of pale yellow, green, or blue, and roofs made of red coloured tiles. Fontainhas' heritage ambience represents the traditional Portuguese influence in the area.

== Location ==
Fontainhas is the oldest Latin quarter of Panjim, and is similar to a Mediterranean city. Located at the foot of the Altinho Hills, it is bounded on the west by the hills with springs from which its name derives. (Fontainhas is Portuguese for "little fountain".) On the east side, it is bounded by an ancient creek known as the Ourem Creek. It was built on reclaimed land.

== History ==
In the late eighteenth century, a Goan expatriate named António João de Sequeira (nicknamed Mossmikar), who had made his wealth while working in Mozambique, established Fontainhas. The name came from a spring at the foot of the hill which began to sprout around 1770, and it is patterned along the lines of Lisbon's Bairro Alto.

In 1844, a government administrator, who had restored some order in Goa, directed that even the people of the lower strata of society should appear properly dressed in public. He built an elegant street with a parapet called the Rua Nova d’Ouremsea on the seaward side of the Fontainhas Bairro (Quarter). In the same area, he also created the Phenis fountain, with a façade and porch.

The Fontainhas had a high population density. The rich lived on Panjim hill in large bungalows, while the less affluent lived at the foot and the east of the hill, hemmed in between the hill and the small tidal creek, which remains dry and emits a foul smell during the low flow season.

William Dalrymple calls Fontainhas a "small chunk of Portugal washed up on the shores of the Indian Ocean". It is the only area in Goa where Portuguese is still the main spoken language.

== Features ==
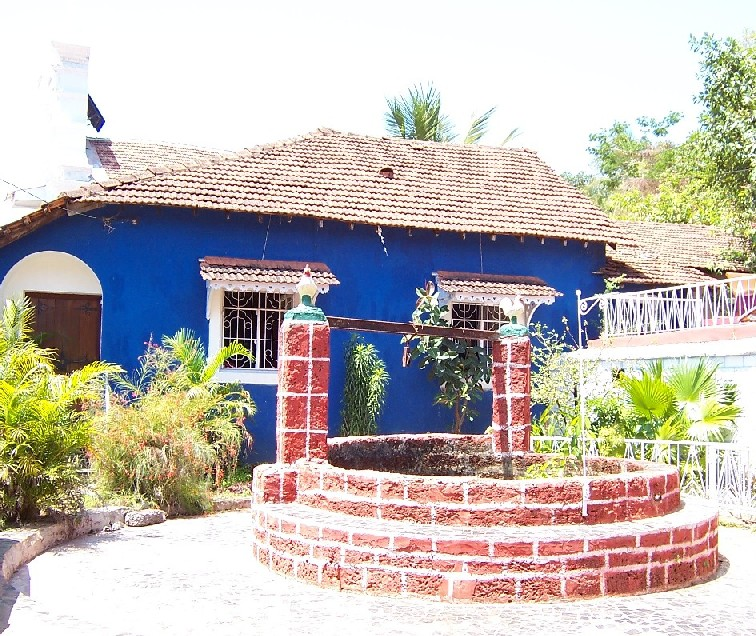
A heritage house in Fontainhas

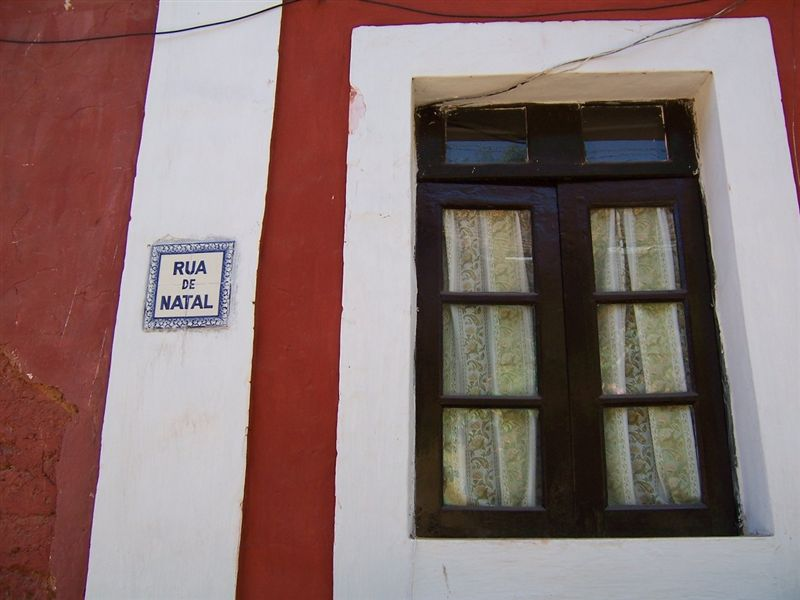
A typical house window in the bairro das fontainhas. Also seen in the picture is the street name displayed on an Azulejo (Portuguese ceramic tiling work).

The old houses built in the 18th and 19th centuries in the Portuguese architectural style remain in their original colourful elegance with roofs made of red tiles and houses painted in pale yellow, green or blue colours. The Fundacão Orienté, a Portuguese public organization involved in the task of restoration of heritage buildings in Goa is also located in this quarter of Panjim. Fonte Phoenix, a well from a natural spring at one of the quarter's houses, has been refurbished. Many art galleries, which also house exotic cafes, are located here.

An evening in the Fontainhas reveals unmarried women sitting on the roofed gallery steps, wearing colourful flowery dresses, scanning newspapers, and chatting with their neighbours in Portuguese. Violinists play musical works of Heitor Villa-Lobos from their windows and cages of birds hang from the ornate balconies overlooking the small red-tiled city square. Another nostalgic scene is of old people dressed in well-pressed linen pants and wearing Homburg hats walking out of taverns and wobbling along the cobbled streets lined with rundown old Volkswagen Beetles. La douceur méditerranéenne (a Mediterranean mildness) can be sighted in the lanes.

While most aristocrats' mansions have been destroyed to make way for modern buildings, some old houses of erstwhile rich Indo-Portuguese people are still found here. Windows and balconies of some of the houses face the back lanes of the Fontainhas.

The houses and the lanes are kept very clean. During Portuguese rule, every urban resident was mandated by law to paint his house every year after the monsoons; this practice is still continued as a tradition.

A popular theme walk in the Fontainhas focuses on the architectural elegance of the atmospheric heritage area.

=== Chapel of St Sebastian ===
The Chapel of St Sebastian, erected in 1818, is located at the southern end of the Fontainhas. It was traditionally the locale for the annual street festival of the Feast of Our Lady of Livrament. An old well exists in its precincts. The chapel is well preserved and has a very large crucifix, which was once fixed at the Palace of the Inquisition in Old Goa; earlier, it was in the palace of Adil Shah but later moved to this chapel when the Viceroy moved out to Cabo. A striking feature of the crucifix is the image of Christ created over it with eyes open, as if to create fear among the people of the interrogations of the Inquisitors. The chapel also houses an image of the Virgin Mary, two veneered wooden chests, and three intricately carved altarpieces relocated from a church in Diu.

== Art festival ==
Every year, for one week, the historic houses in Fontainhas are turned into art galleries, with residents displaying their artworks and Goan heritage, unique architectural features of their balconies, and furnishings in their dining halls.

The Fontainhas festival is an art and culture festival held in the month of February in Goa. The Fontainhas festival is an attempt to create awareness about Goan heritage among younger generations and in turn aiming to preserve the distinct cultural scene prevalent in Goa. The Goan heritage of music, dance and art is closely connected to its Portuguese counterpart and is well displayed at this festival. Singers and dancers from across the world come here to perform on this occasion. Every day there are musical and dance events. The festival provides an opportunity for the artists to expand their network.

== Bibliography ==
- Burton, Lady Isabel (1879). Arabia, Egypt, India: A Narrative of Travel. W. Mullan and son. p. 472.
- Dalrymple, William (22 January 2004). The Age of kali: Indian Travels & Encounters. Penguin Books Limited. ISBN 978-93-5118-342-6.
- McCulloch; Stott, David (30 October 2013). Goa (with Mumbai) Footprint Focus Guide. Footprint Travel Guides. ISBN 978-1-909268-42-5.
- Murphy, Dervla (11 December 1989). On a Shoestring to Coorg: A Travel Memoir of India. Overlook. ISBN 978-1-4683-0573-9.
- O'Reilly, James; Habegger, Larry (1 January 2004). Travelers' Tales India. Travelers' Tales/Solas House, Incorporated. ISBN 978-1-932361-01-8.
- Outlook Traveller. Outlook Publishing. December 2008.
- Survey, India. Marine (1881). General Report of the Operations of the Marine Survey of India. Government Press. p. 21.
