= Caranzalem =

Neighborhood in Panjim, Goa, India

- Neighborhood
- Interactive map of Caranzalem
- Country: India
- State: Goa
- City: Panjim

Caranzalem (pronounced Caranzale (Note: the alphabet m is silent)) is a neighborhood located on the west side of the city of Panjim, the capital of the state of Goa. It is situated on the island of Tiswadi and is known for its beach with same name.

The neighborhood has a beach of the same name, the Caranzalem Beach, which is located at a distance of about 5 km. from the center of Panaji by Miramar and Caranzalem. The beach is 3.5 km long which has stretches of white sand and clear water. The beach is considered safe for swimming.

There are water sport facilities available and many hotels, restaurants and shacks in the area which serve Goan food and drinks.

Miramar-Dona Paula road runs parallel to the beach. The principle wards are Aivao, Bazar Vaddo, Borchem Bhat, Cavialvaddo, Dando, Dona Paula, Firgozvaddo and Quevnem.

The local church is named the Our Lady of the Rosary Church. It has an old chapel which is called the Sanctuary for Christian worship. The property of the church belongs to the "Fabrica" that looks after the affairs of the Church. There are several Christian groups recognised by the Church like the Society of St. Vincent De Paul (Rosary Conference), Couples For Christ and Living Waters. Our Lady of the Rosary School is one of the prominent schools in Dona Paula, Caranzalem.

The Raj Bhavan and the National Institute of Oceanography are situated in Dona Paula.
