= Miramar, Goa =

Miramar
- Location of Miramar Beach in Goa Miramar (India)
- Coordinates: 15°28′59″N 73°48′26″E
- Country: India
- State: Goa

Miramar is the beach area of the Goan capital of Panjim, also known as Panaji and is one of the most visited beaches of Goa. It is one of the two only beaches in Panjim, other being Caranzalem beach. Many people, mostly tourists, come to this beach every day. Miramar Beach was the venue for Beach Volleyball events of the 2014 Lusofonia Games. Originally named Porta de Gaspar Dias by the Portuguese, the name was then changed to Miramar.

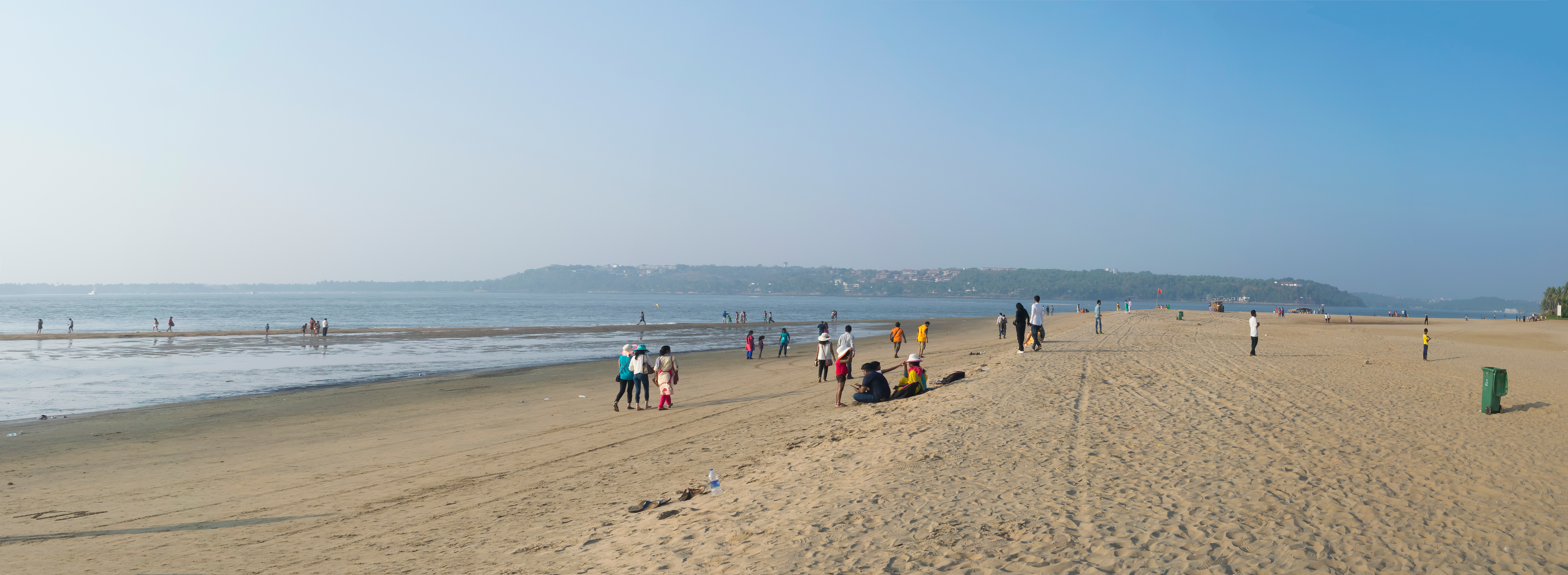
Miramar Beach

Situated at the confluence of the Mandovi River and the Arabian Sea, it is a small beach that occasionally hosts some events. There are several educational institutions in the surrounding vicinity, including Dhempe College of Arts and Science, V. M. Salgaonkar College of Law and Sharada Mandir High School. Clube Gaspar de Dias and a popular café are nearby.

== How to reach ==
=== Airport ===
The closest airport is the Goa International Airport. The beach is a 30 minutes car ride from the airport.

=== From Panjim ===
It is around 3 km from Panjim. The beach can be easily accessed by bus or cab, which would take around 12 minutes. Alternatively, one can hire bikes from the Panjim bus stand.
