= Altinho, Goa =

Neighborhood in Panaji, Goa

Altinho (Portuguese: High) is a hill neighbourhood of Panaji, the state capital of India's smallest state Goa.

In the past it has been considered an elite residential colony, with the State's chief minister's residence and the Archbishop's palace located here. Although Altinho is a residential area, it is home to Panaji's All India Radio station (whose precursor was the famed Emissora de Goa radio station of Portuguese times). It is also home to a sprawling set of quarters for government servants, and homes allotted to ruling party politicians, and the Lokayukta's residence.
