= Panaji =

Capital city of the Indian state of Goa

Panaji Ponnjem (Goan Konkani) Nova Goa, Pangim (Portuguese) Panjim
- State capital city
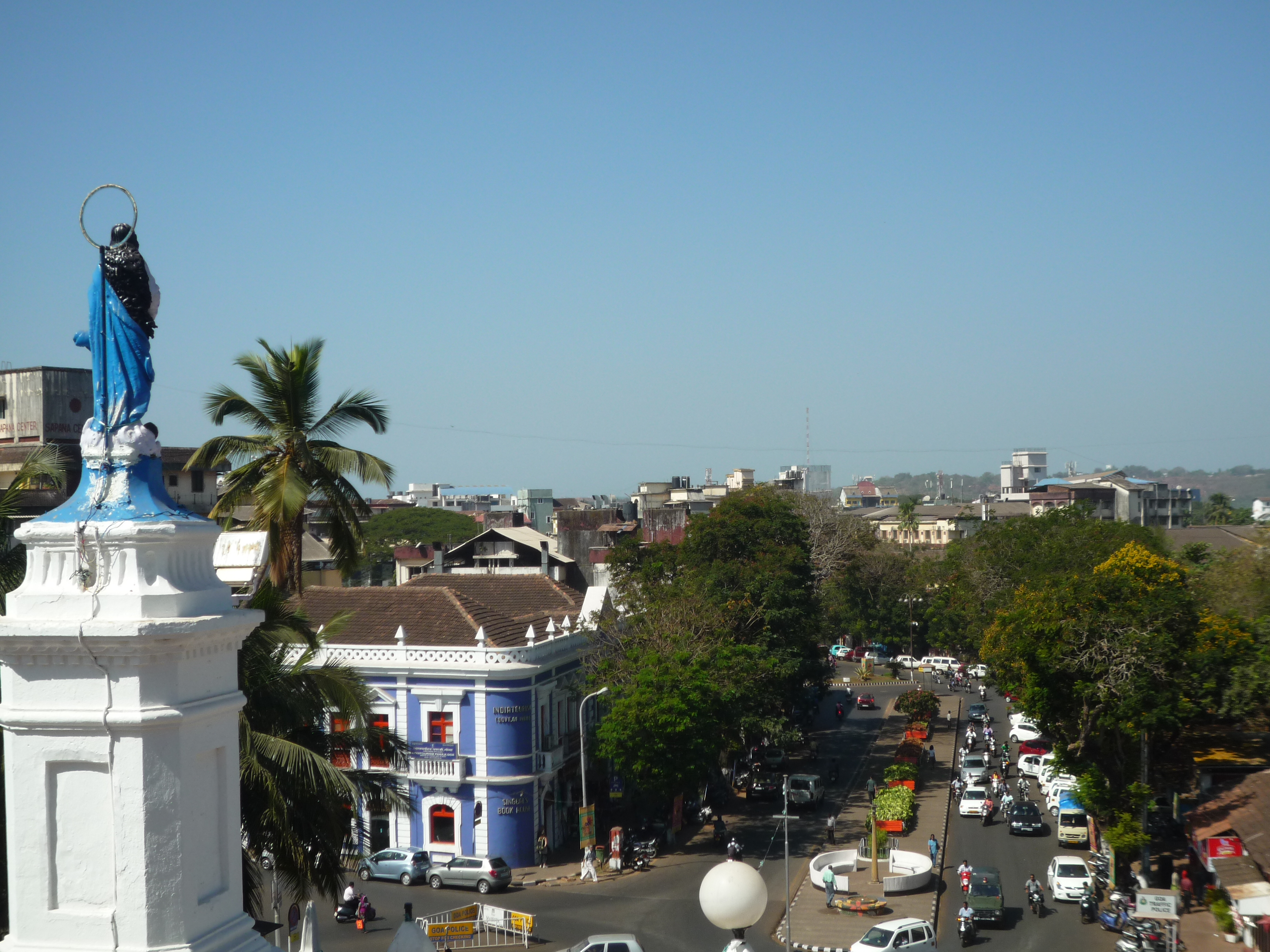
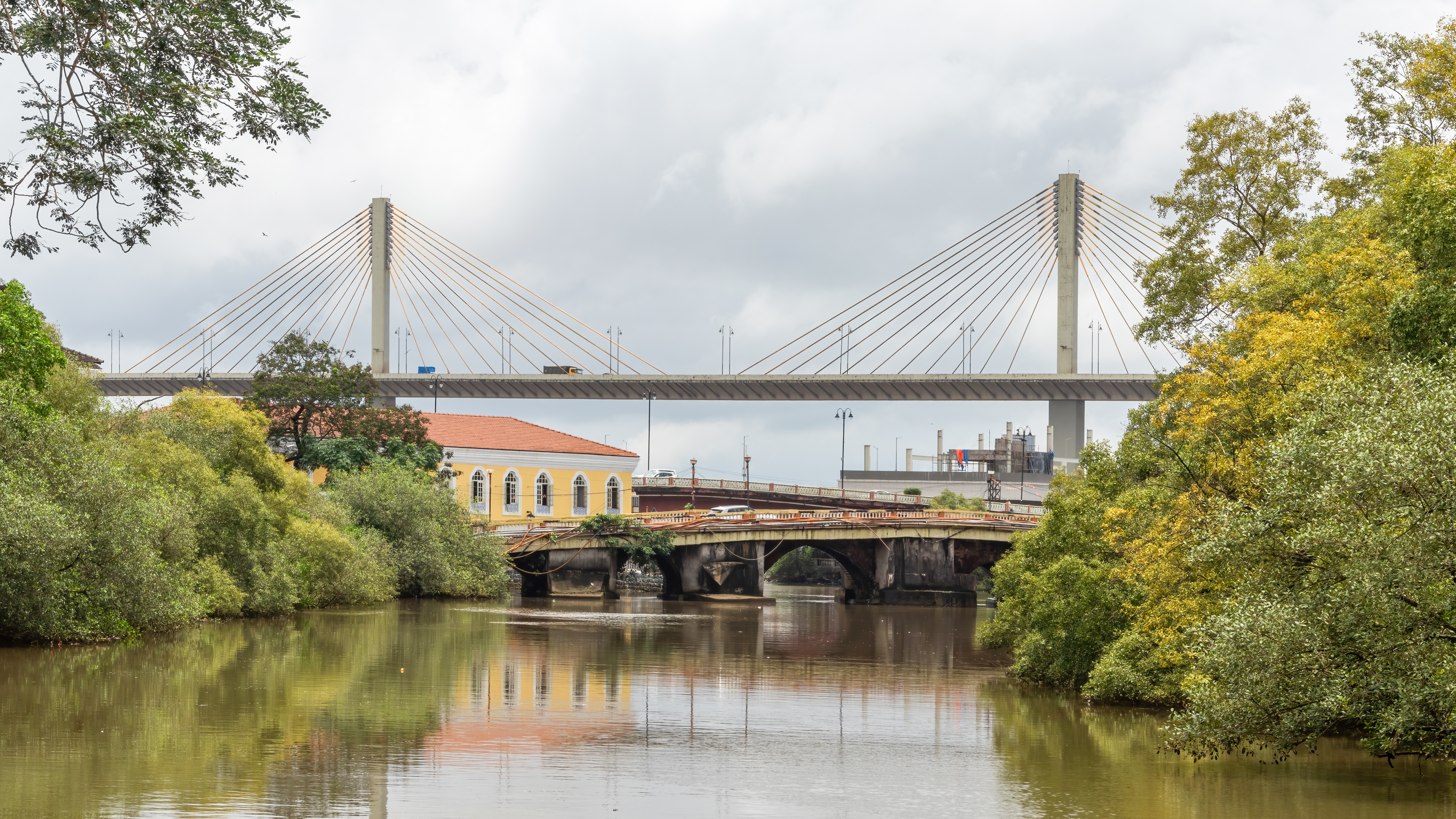
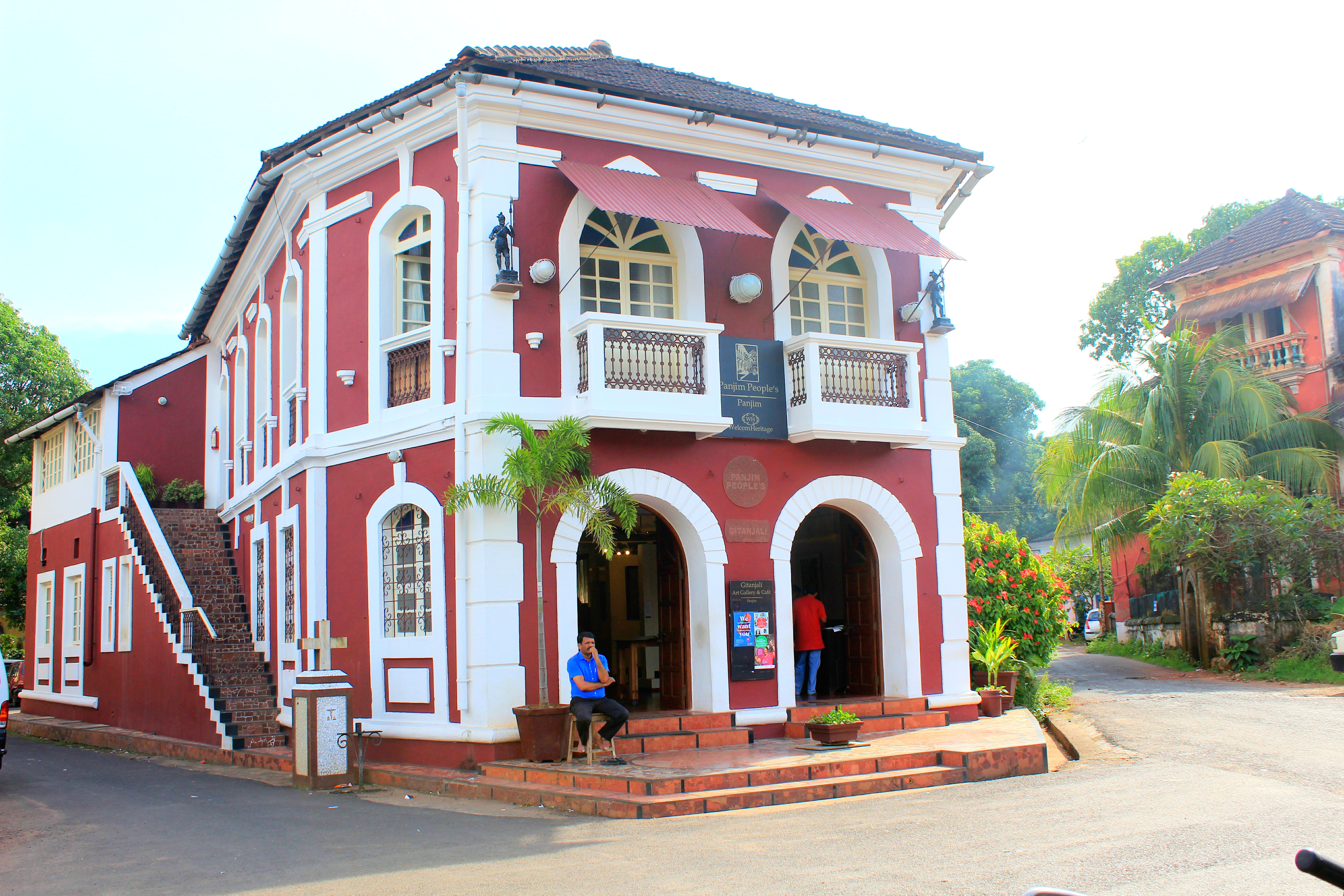
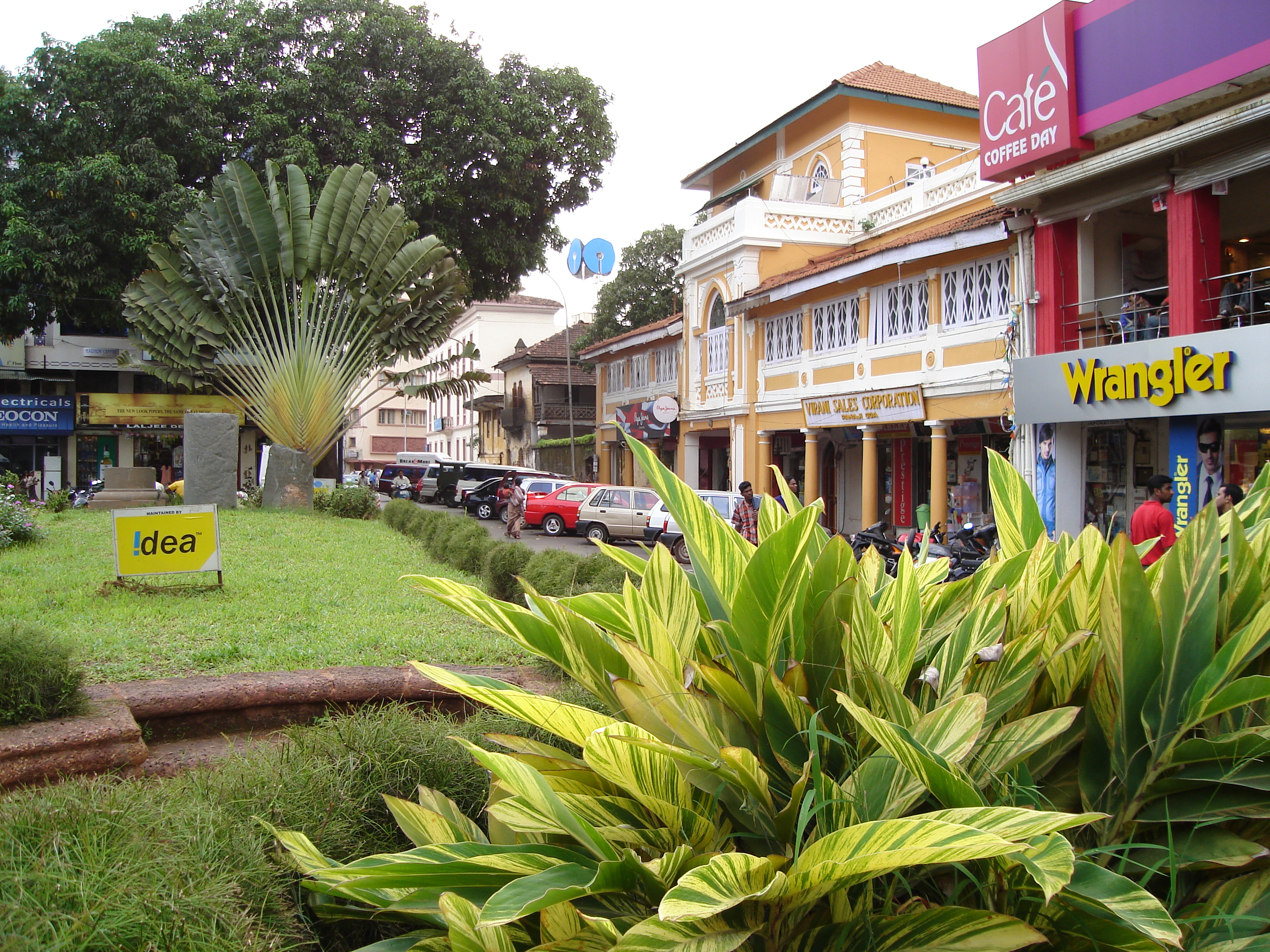
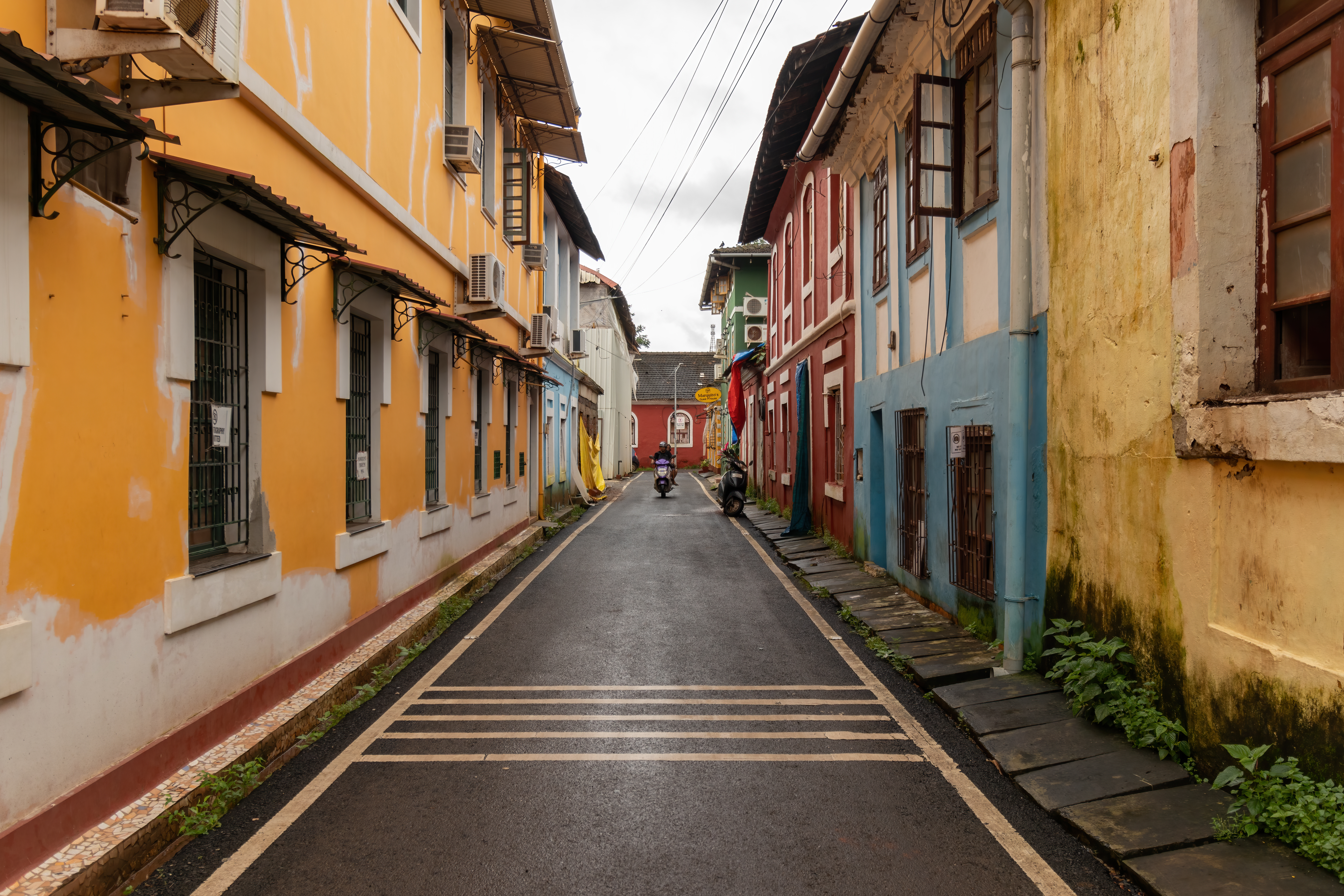
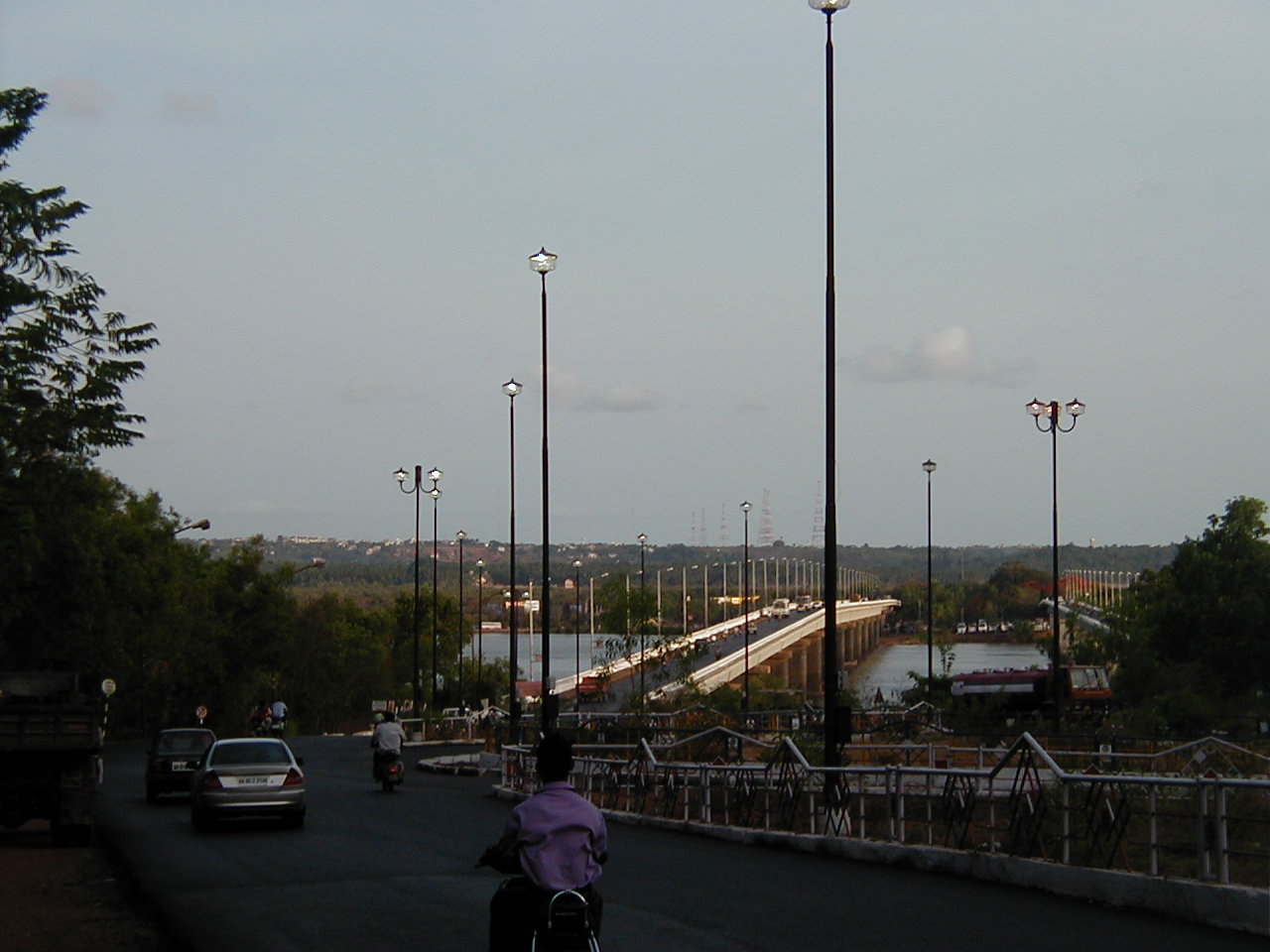
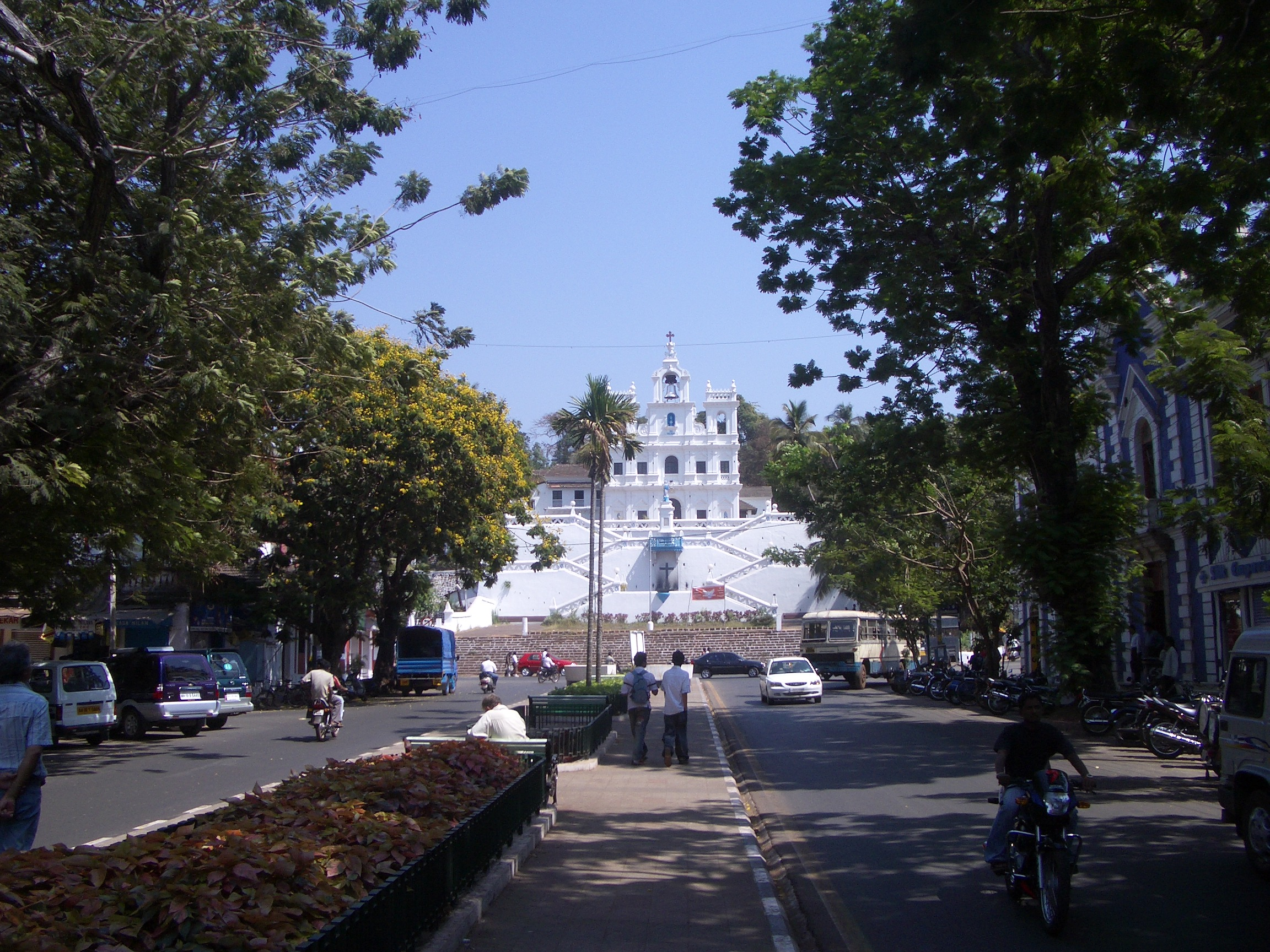
- Panaji city view Atal Setu People's Art Gallery & Café Street of Panjim Road along Vasco-da-gama Mandovi bridge Church in Panaji
- Location of Panaji in Goa
- Coordinates: 15°29′56″N 73°49′40″E
- Country: India
- State: Goa
- District: North Goa
- Sub-district: Tiswadi
- Elevated to Capital: 1843

Government
  - Type: Municipal Corporation
  - Body: Corporation of the City of Panaji
  - Mayor: Rohit Monserrate
  - Deputy Mayor: Sanjeev Naik
  - Member of the Legislative Assembly of Goa: Atanasio Monserrate (BJP)

Area
  - City: 8.27 km^{2} (3.19 sq mi)
  - Metro: 76.3 km^{2} (29.5 sq mi)
- Elevation: 7 m (23 ft)

Population (2011)
  - City: 40,017
  - Rank: 3rd in Goa
  - Density: 4,840/km^{2} (12,500/sq mi)
  - Metro: 114,759
- Demonym(s): Ponnjekar, Panjimite

Languages
  - Official: Konkani; English
  - Additional/Cultural: Portuguese
- Time zone: UTC+5:30 (IST)
- PIN: 403001
- Telephone code: 0832
- Vehicle registration: GA-01, GA-07
- Website: ccpgoa.com

Panaji (formerly Nova Goa; /ˈpʌnədʒi/; Goan Konkani: Ponnjem, IPA: [pɵɳd͡ʑɛ̃] ; Portuguese: Pangim), also known as Panjim, is the capital of the Indian state of Goa and the headquarters of the North Goa district. It was previously the territorial capital of the former Portuguese India (Estado da Índia). It lies on the banks of the Mandovi river estuary in the Tiswadi sub-district (taluka). With a population of 114,759 in the metropolitan area, Panaji is Goa's largest urban agglomeration, ahead of Margão and Mormugão.

Panaji has terraced hills, concrete buildings with balconies and red-tiled roofs, churches, and a riverside promenade. There are avenues lined with gulmohar, acacia and other trees. The baroque Our Lady of the Immaculate Conception Church is located overlooking the main square known as Praça da Igreja. Panaji has been selected as one of a hundred Indian cities to be developed as a smart city under the Smart Cities Mission. Panaji's HDI (United Nations Human Development Index) is almost around 0.80, and is considered to be the best amongst other major Indian cities.

The city was built with stepped streets and a 7-kilometre-long (4-mile) promenade on a planned grid system after the Portuguese relocated the capital from Old Goa in the 17th century. It was elevated from a town to a city on 22 March 1843.

== Etymology ==
The Portuguese name is Pangim. The city had been renamed Nova Goa (Portuguese for "New Goa") when it officially replaced the City of Goa (now Old Goa) as the capital of Portuguese India, though the Viceroy had already moved there in 1759.

The justification of the modern word Panaji is derived from the words panjani and khali, which mean a boat and a small creek respectively, in Sanskrit. Thus the modern word Panjim is believed to be a corruption of the old word Panjanakhani as inscribed on the discovered Panjim copper-plates dated 1059 CE, belonging to the rule of Kadamba king Jayakesi I. According to legend, this northern capital city was mentioned in a stone inscription of Kadamba king Jayakesi I dated 1054 CE as 'Panjanakhani', giving him the epithet of Padavalendra which is Kannada for lord of the western ocean.

== History ==
Panaji was made the first neighbourhood of "Nova Goa" (New Goa) capital of Portuguese India, after a devastating epidemic decimated the population of the Cidade de Goa (Old Goa) in the mid-18th century.

Panaji was annexed by India with the rest of Goa and the former Portuguese territories after the Indian annexation of Portuguese India in 1961. It became a state-capital on Goa's elevation to statehood in 1987 and between 1961 and 1987 it was the capital of the Union Territory of Goa, Daman and Diu. A new Legislative Assembly complex was inaugurated in March 2000, across the Mandovi River, now full of casinos, in Alto Porvorim. Panaji is also the administrative headquarters of North Goa district.

== Geography ==
Panaji is located at 15°29′56″N 73°49′40″E. It has an average elevation of 7 metres (23 feet).

=== Suburbs ===
Panaji has various vāde or sub-divisions, including:

- São Tomé, Fontainhas, Mala, Portais, Altinho, Cortin, Praça da Igreja, Tar, Bazar, Japão, and Boca de Vaca.

Some areas outlying it are:

- Campal, Santa Inez, Chinchollem, Batulem, Merces, Bambolim, Caranzalem, Santa Cruz, Siridao, Dona Paula, and Platô de Taleigão.

Besides lying on the banks of the Mandovi River, Panaji is bound by two creeks called pői by the locals, namely Ourém creek and Santa Inêz creek.

== Demographics ==
During the 2011 census of India, Panaji had a population of 114,405. Males constituted 52% of the population and females 48%. It had an average literacy rate of 90.9%; male literacy was 94.6% and female literacy 86.9%. In Panaji, 9.6% of the population was under 7 years of age.

=== Religion ===
Panaji comprises three major religions, with Hinduism being the majority with 64.08% followers, Christianity with 26.51% followers, and the smallest being Islam with 8.84% followers. 0.4% of the population count as other which include Buddhist, Jain, and Sikh followers.

== Climate ==
Panaji features a tropical monsoon climate (Köppen climate classification Am). The climate in Panaji is hot in summer and equable in winter. During summers (from March to May) the temperature reaches up to 32 °C (90 °F) and in winters (from November to February) it is usually between 31 °C (88 °F) and 23 °C (73 °F).

The monsoon period is from June to October with heavy rainfall and gusty winds. The annual average rainfall is 2,932 mm (115.43 in).

Climate data for Panaji (1991–2020, extremes 1901–2012)
Month	Jan	Feb	Mar	Apr	May	Jun	Jul	Aug	Sep	Oct	Nov	Dec	Year
Record high °C (°F)	36.7 (98.1)	39.2 (102.6)	39.0 (102.2)	39.8 (103.6)	38.6 (101.5)	37.8 (100.0)	33.5 (92.3)	34.0 (93.2)	33.4 (92.1)	37.2 (99.0)	37.2 (99.0)	36.6 (97.9)	39.8 (103.6)
Mean daily maximum °C (°F)	32.5 (90.5)	32.4 (90.3)	32.6 (90.7)	33.4 (92.1)	33.8 (92.8)	30.9 (87.6)	29.3 (84.7)	29.5 (85.1)	30.2 (86.4)	32.0 (89.6)	33.5 (92.3)	33.1 (91.6)	32.0 (89.6)
Daily mean °C (°F)	26.3 (79.3)	26.6 (79.9)	27.9 (82.2)	29.5 (85.1)	30.1 (86.2)	27.8 (82.0)	26.8 (80.2)	26.9 (80.4)	27.1 (80.8)	28.0 (82.4)	28.1 (82.6)	27.0 (80.6)	27.7 (81.8)
Mean daily minimum °C (°F)	20.0 (68.0)	20.6 (69.1)	23.3 (73.9)	25.4 (77.7)	26.3 (79.3)	24.9 (76.8)	24.2 (75.6)	24.2 (75.6)	24.0 (75.2)	24.0 (75.2)	22.7 (72.9)	20.9 (69.6)	23.4 (74.1)
Record low °C (°F)	14.4 (57.9)	13.3 (55.9)	16.8 (62.2)	20.2 (68.4)	20.9 (69.6)	20.7 (69.3)	21.6 (70.9)	21.7 (71.1)	21.0 (69.8)	20.0 (68.0)	15.3 (59.5)	15.7 (60.3)	13.3 (55.9)
Average rainfall mm (inches)	1.0 (0.04)	0.1 (0.00)	0.0 (0.0)	4.9 (0.19)	76.6 (3.02)	890.4 (35.06)	955.2 (37.61)	571.7 (22.51)	304.1 (11.97)	156.4 (6.16)	21.3 (0.84)	2.5 (0.10)	2,984.1 (117.48)
Average rainy days	0.1	0.0	0.1	0.3	3.6	21.2	26.7	23.0	13.7	6.8	1.5	0.2	97.3
Average relative humidity (%) (at 17:30 IST)	57	59	65	67	69	83	87	86	82	76	65	58	71
Mean monthly sunshine hours	303.8	291.0	288.3	279.0	285.2	132.0	96.1	120.9	180.0	232.5	270.0	294.5	2,773.3
Mean daily sunshine hours	9.8	10.3	9.3	9.3	9.2	4.4	3.1	3.9	6.0	7.5	9.0	9.5	7.6
Source 1: India Meteorological Department (sun, 1971–2000)
Source 2: Tokyo Climate Center (mean temperatures 1991–2020)

== Cityscape ==
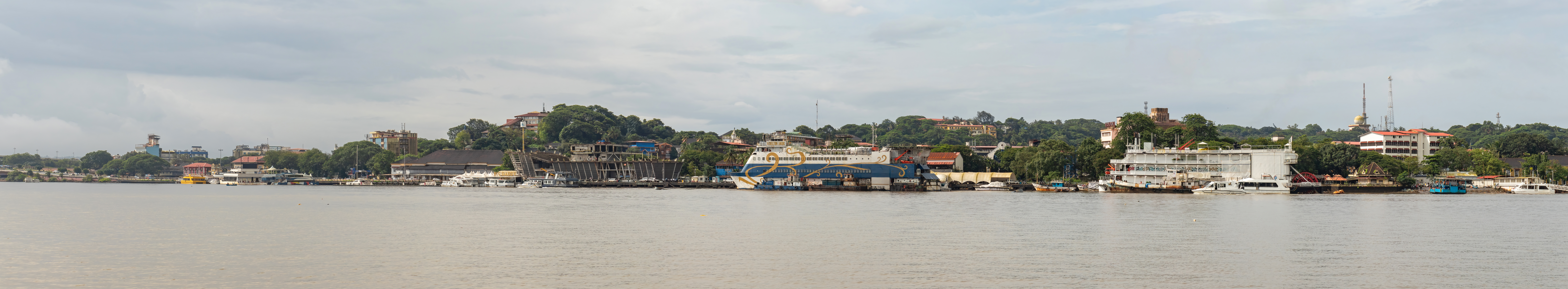
Skyline of the city

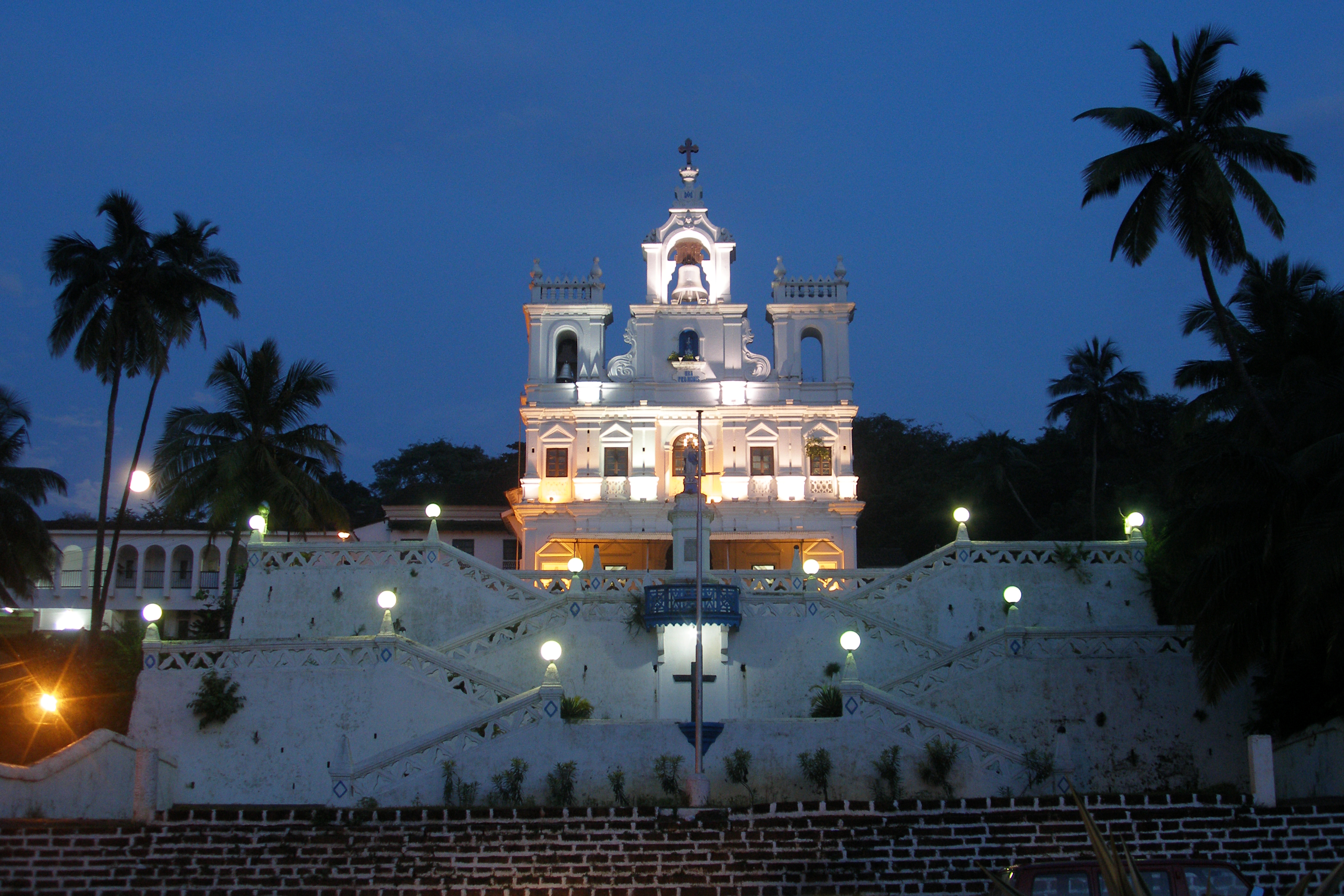
Our Lady of the Immaculate Conception Church is located in the heart of Panjim.

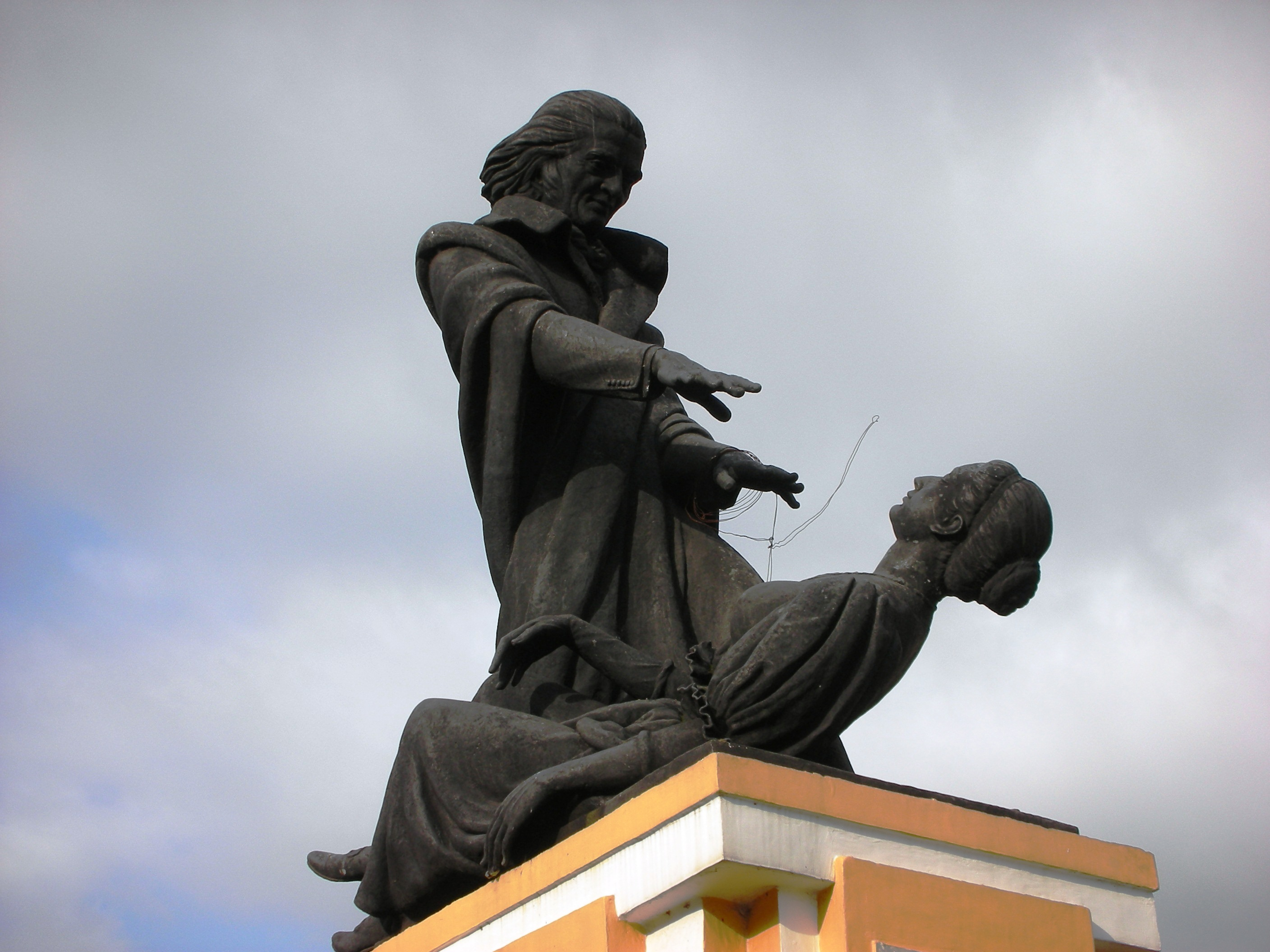
Statue of Abbé Faria, a prominent Goan who was a pioneer of hypnotism, and one of the main conspirators of the Conspiracy of the Pintos, at Panjim, Goa.

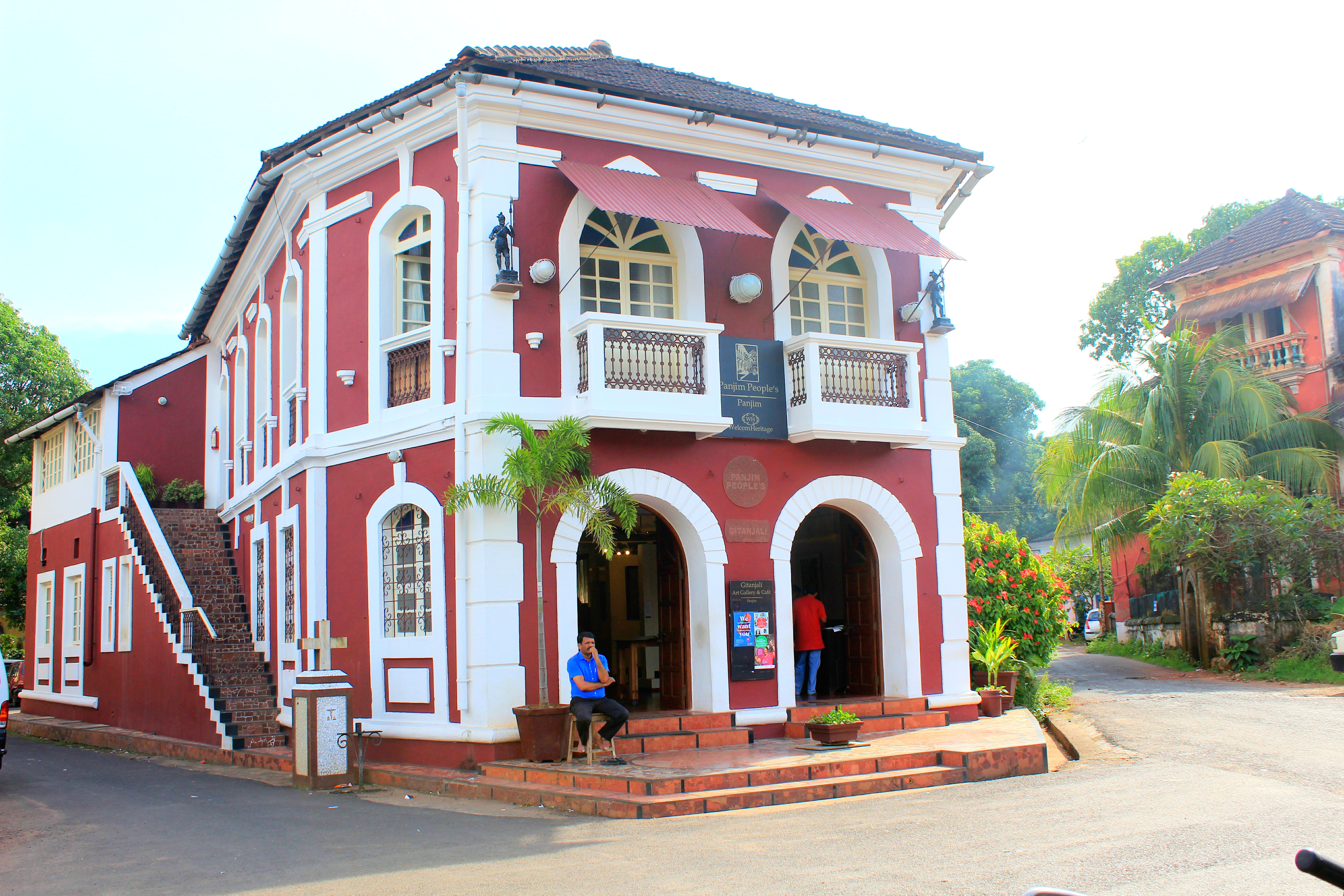
Panaji People's Art Gallery & Café

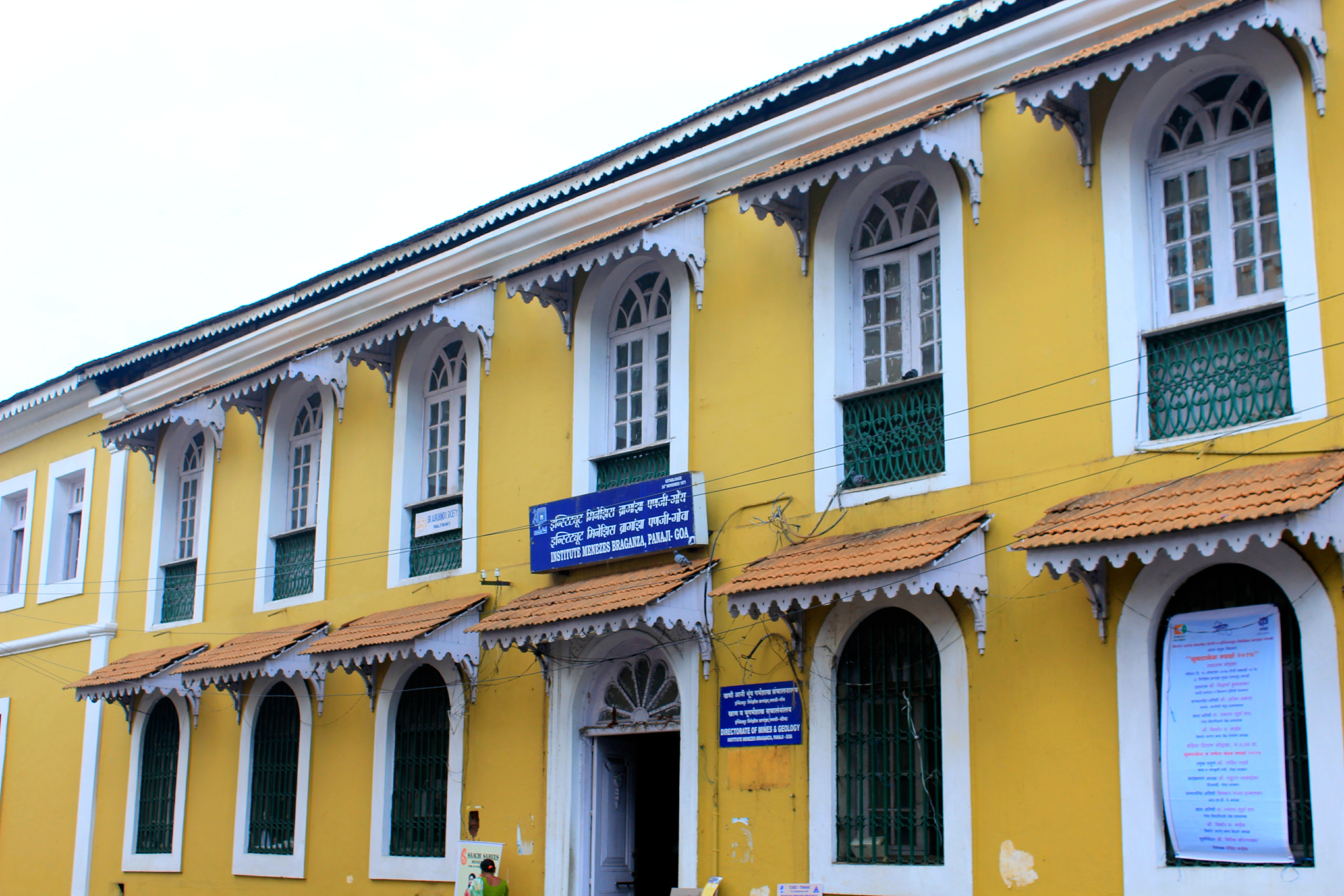
The Menezes Bragança Institute

The heart of the city is the Praça da Igreja (Church Square) where the Jardim Garcia de Orta (municipal garden, named after Portuguese botanist Garcia de Orta) with the Portuguese Baroque Igreja de Nossa Senhora da Imaculada Conceição, originally built in 1541. Other tourist attractions include the old and rebuilt Adilshahi Palace (or Idalcão Palace), dating from the sixteenth century, the Institute Menezes Braganza, the Chapel of St. Sebastian and the Fontainhas area—which is considered to be the old Latin Quarter—as well as the nearby beach of Miramar. Panaji hosted the relics of Saint John Bosco (also known as Don Bosco) until 21 August 2011 at the Don Bosco Oratory.

One of the capital city's most discerning assets is the Mahalaxmi Temple. Located on the Dada Vaidya road (known as Rua de Saudade during Portuguese rule), the Mahalaxmi deity is the chief object of veneration for all Panjimites, irrespective of caste, class, sex or creed.

The carnival celebrations in February include a colourful parade on the streets. This is followed by the Shigmo / Xigmo, or Holi. The Narkāsūr parade on the night before Diwali in the city is very colourful.

Well-known places in Panaji are the 18th June Road (a busy thoroughfare in the heart of the town and a shopping area for tourists and locals), Mala area, Miramar beach and the Kala Academy (a cultural centre known for its structure built by architect Charles Correa). Kala Academy is a place where Goa showcases its art and culture.

=== Palace of Adil Shah (Secretariat Building) ===
Situated on the banks of Mandovi River in the heart of Panaji is ‘Old Secretariat’ building popularly known as ‘Adil Shah Palace’. It was built by Yusuf Adil Shah of the Bijapur Sultanate in around 1500, as a summer residence and fortress. The building was armed with 55 cannons and surrounded by a moat. The Palace was besieged by Portuguese admiral Afonso de Albuquerque in 1510 and in the mid-1500s the Portuguese conquerors renamed it as ‘Hidalcão's Palace’ (Adil Shah was called Hidalcão in Portuguese) and was the temporary residence of the first ‘Viceroy of Goa’. In 1963 this ancient structure was renovated by Goa government to house Goa Legislative Assembly. This structure today is the Goa State Museum.

=== Other attractions ===
Salim Ali Bird Sanctuary is a bird sanctuary named after the ornithologist Dr. Salim Ali. The sanctuary, located in the village of Chorão, near Panaji, plays host to rare and endangered bird species—both migratory and resident.

Goa is famous for its beaches, and Miramar, Bambolim, and Dona Paula are three popular beaches located near Panaji.

Dona Paula is the meeting point for two of Goa's major rivers, Zuari and Mandovi. These two rivers meet at the Arabian Sea. The official residence of the governor of Goa, known as Cabo Raj Bhavan, is situated on the westernmost tip of Dona Paula.

Miramar Beach is one of the more crowded beaches in Goa, which remains full with local and international tourists throughout the year.

Also located near Panaji, the Goa Science Centre was opened to the public in December 2001. The Caculo Mall is also located in St. Inez near Panaji. The Madhuban Complex, at St. Inez, is also very popular among Panjimites.

== Education ==
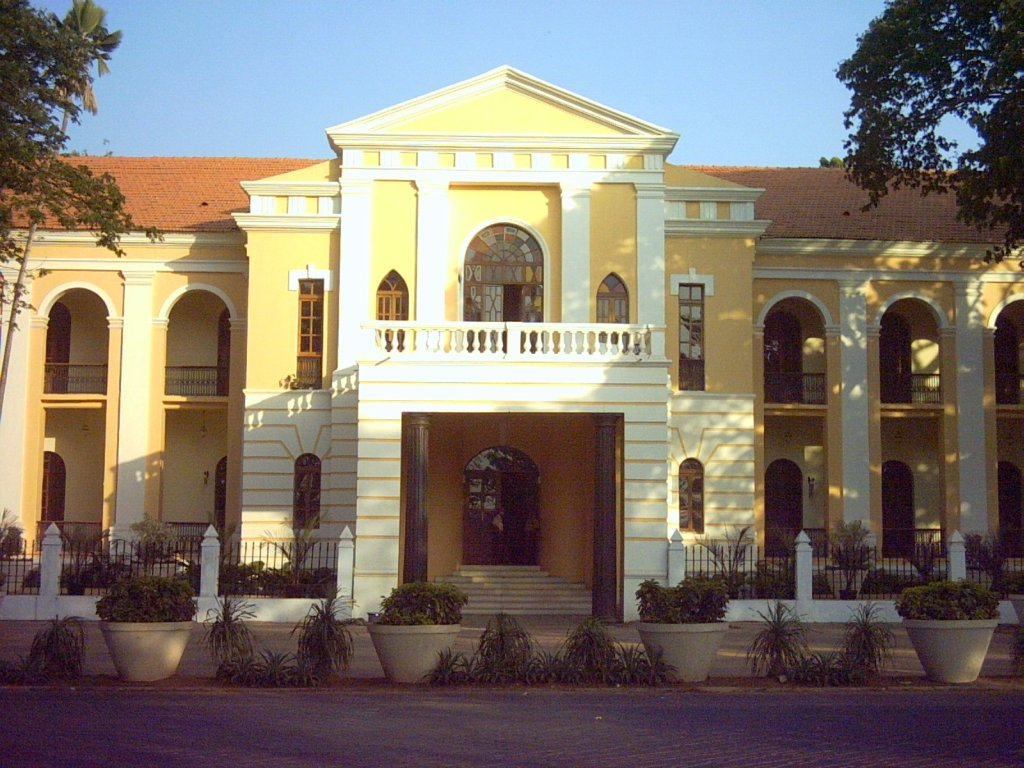
The renovated building of Goa Medical College (established in 1842 as Escola Médico-Cirúrgica de Goa) in Campal. The institution has since been relocated and this building now serves as the headquarters of the Entertainment Society of Goa (ESG).

Goa's only state university, the Goa University, is situated at Taleigão on the outskirts of Panaji. Some other educational institutes in Panaji are:

- Don Bosco College, Panjim
- Goa Medical College, Bambolim
- Goa College of Pharmacy
- Goa Polytechnic, Panjim
- Goa College of Fine Arts
- The Rosary High School, Miramar
- Our Lady of Rosary (Green Rosary), Dona Paula
- Santa Cruz High School, Santa Cruz
- Don Bosco High School
- Goa Institute of Management
- Dempo College of Commerce and Economics, Altinho
- Dhempe College of Arts and Sciences, Miramar
- Mary Immaculate Girls High School, São Tomé/Fontainhas
- Sharada Mandir School, Miramar

=== Research centres ===
The National Institute of Oceanography (CSIR-NIO) is situated at Dona Paula, on the outskirts of Panaji city. It specialises in marine science research.

== Transport ==
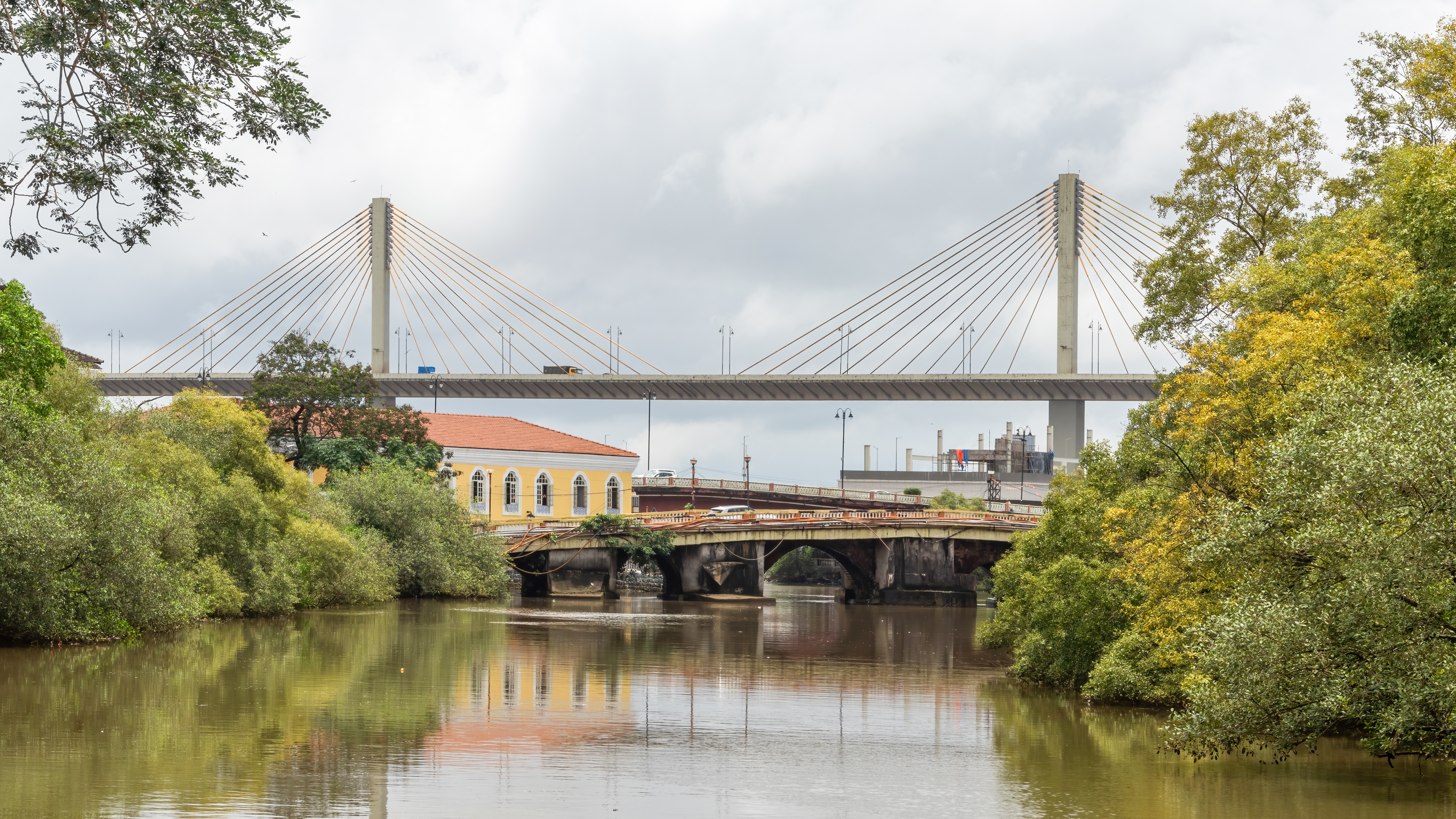
Atal Setu and bridges across Rio de Ourem

The nearest airport is Dabolim Airport which is 30 kilometres (19 miles) away. The primary form of public transport is buses.

The other recently developed airport near to Panjim is Mopa Airport which is 40 kilometres (25 miles) away. KTC Bus Stand, Patto, Panjim is Panjim's central bus stand for public Kadamba Transport Corporation (KTC) and other buses. Mapusa is the nearest city, from where you can find ample public transport to the coastal areas in the form of buses, cabs, etc.

== Media and communications ==
Apart from leading national newspapers, there are a few locally published newspapers which are readily available, including "The Navhind Times", "o Heraldo", "Gomantak Times" (now defunct), and "The Goan".

Panaji has few local radio stations which transmit various programs of mass interest. Indigo 91.9, Big FM 92.7, Vividh Bharati 101.1 and FM Rainbow 105.4 are few FM radio stations available. The latter two are State-owned All India Radio. The annual International Film Festival of India (IFFI) is held in Panaji.

== Governance ==
The Goa government, as well as the Indian government, has its major offices in Goa.

- Bombay High Court – Goa bench
- Goa Education Development Corporation
- Industrial Development Corporation Goa
- Junta House – houses government offices
- Goa Passport Office
- Press Information Bureau (Government of India's Press Office)
- Sports Authority of Goa
- All India Radio, Altinho
- Doordarshan Complex, Altinho

The Goa Legislative Assembly is situated at Alto Porvorim, about 2 km (1.2 mi) from Panaji. The hillock called Altinho houses some major central government offices and the residences of prominent officials and politicians.

Panaji is part of Panaji (Goa Assembly constituency) and North Goa (Lok Sabha constituency).

== Politics ==
The current Chief Minister of Goa, Pramod Sawant, resides in Altinho, Panjim. The Corporation of the City of Panaji (CCP) administers the city and its Mayor is Rohit Monserrate. Vasant Agshikar is the Deputy Mayor.

The Governor of Goa stays at the Cabo Raj Bhavan at Dona Paula, about 8 km (5 mi) from Panaji. The current Governor of Goa is Ashok Gajapathi Raju.

== Sports ==
Two of Goa's premier association football clubs Dempo S.C. and Sporting Clube de Goa are based in Panaji and they both compete in India's one of the top-tier league I-League. Clube Tennis de Gaspar Dias in Miramar was founded in the year 1926 and remains among the most sought after Tennis clubs in Goa. The multipurpose Campal Indoor Complex is planned in Campal besides the existing football ground. The Don Bosco college football grounds on General Bernardo Guedes road has been long a long established sports field in the city. It also has a football club named FC Goa in Indian Super League.

== International relations ==
=== Twin towns – Sister cities ===
Panaji is twinned with:

- Lisbon, Portugal
- Victoria, Seychelles

== See also ==
- Tourism in Goa
- Panjim Footballers
