= IIT Goa =

Research institute in Goa, India

Indian Institute of Technology Goa
- Motto: Vidyā vinayena dīpyate (Sanskrit)
- Motto in English: Knowledge shines with humility
- Type: Public
- Established: 30 July 2016; 10 years ago
- Chairman: Adil Siraj Zainulbhai
- Director: Dhirendra S. Katti
- Academic staff: 68
- Undergraduates: 566
- Postgraduates: 157
- Location: Farmagudi, Goa, India; 15.423°N 73.980°E
- Website: www.iitgoa.ac.in

Indian Institute of Technology Goa (IIT Goa or IITGoa) is an autonomous public university located in Goa and an institute of National Importance. Ever since an IIT was allotted to Goa by the Central government in 2014, the new Indian Institute of Technology (IIT) at Goa started functioning from July, 2016 in a temporary campus housed at Goa Engineering College (GEC). The campus is located at Farmagudi, Goa. Currently, it offers BTech, MTech and PhD courses in various core and one non-core branches majorly in Electrical Engineering, Computer Science and Engineering, Mechanical Engineering and Mathematics and Computing.

As part of the mentorship plan, IIT-Bombay was the mentor for IIT-Goa for three pioneer years. The HRD Ministry had set up an IIT monitoring cell at IIT-Bombay and the committee members had been designated as officials on special duty to supervise the process of setting up IIT-Goa.

== Campus ==
The temporary campus is located at Farmagudi, Ponda approximately 29 km southeast of Panaji, the capital of Goa and it is a temporary campus with minimal facilities borrowed from GEC Goa. As of now the state government has not given any land to build a campus and lacks the political will to do so. The state of Goa is well connected by road ways, rail ways and air ways with various parts of the country. At present IIT Goa is temporarily accommodated and functioning in the Goa Engineering College (GEC) Campus located at Farmagudi, Goa. Goa Government had identified land for permanent campus in Guleli village panchayat in North Goa's Sattari sub district, measures approximately 320 acres, has been approved by Union ministry of human resources development (HRD). The MHRD expects that the IIT Goa will function from the temporary campus for just the initial three years and is expected to move to its permanent facility by the fourth year.

In May 2020, four years after IIT Goa started running, Goa Chief Minister Pramod Sawant handed over the documents of transfer of land (admeasuring 10 lakh square meters) in Melauli, Sattari, to the Director of IIT Goa, Prof. B.K. Mishra. This was far from the first site on which the government was trying to build the IIT Goa campus. Prior to this, sites at Canacona and Sanguem were identified, but plans to set up the campus in these places were scrapped after resistance and opposition from local residents in both these areas.

However, protests by residents over the Melauli site which had started in February 2020, continued in the following months. In August 2020, the residents of Melauli organized a particularly unique protest, tying rakhis to the trees that the government had marked for felling for the proposed IIT Goa project. Reasons for opposing the project is that the site is a forest area. Located at the foothills of the Western Ghats, the land is covered with cashew trees that the villagers claim, have sustained them for generations. As such, they have been demanding that the government find an alternative site for the IIT campus, which will not cause as much loss to the environment.

== Organisation and administration ==
=== Departments, Centers and Schools ===
In the first 3 years of its existence, IIT Goa offered 30 seats each in B. Tech. in the streams of Computer Science and Engineering, Electrical Engineering and Mechanical Engineering. Classes began on July 15 2016, along with the other IITs across the country. IIT Goa now offers 150 seats in B. Tech. in Computer Science and Engineering, Electrical Engineering, Mechanical Engineering and Mathematics and Computing. Apart from these, it also offers some seats each in M. Tech. in the same streams and some in Doctorate as well.

== Student life ==
=== Cultural, Technical and non-academic activities ===
IIT Goa students have developed clubs for following hobbies and passions like Photography Club, Designing Club, Oratory Club, Literature Club, Dramatics Club, Fine Arts Club, Music Club, Dance Club and a College Band.

Also, IIT Goa has developed clubs for technical activities for hobbies like Programming Club, Economic Club, and Robotics Club. IIT Goa has also teams dedicated to national Formula Student Competitions, and a team dedicated to national robotics competitions.

As of now, IIT Goa doesn't have a permanent campus, but they organised their first inter-college Techno-Cultural Fest "Cultrang" in 2020 in their temporary campus. But they did not organize an Inter-Sports Fest yet. Also, the students actively participate in events hosted by other colleges like in WAVES organized by BITS GOA, Saavyas by National Institute of Technology Goa, Happenings and Spectrum by GEC, Mood Indigo by IIT Bombay etc.

In sports events, IIT GOA participates regularly in events like Inter IIT Sports Meet, Aavhan by IIT Bombay, Spree by BITS GOA and more.

There are many Intra-College events organized by the students, a sports dedicated intra-college fest named "Chakravyuh" and a sports-cultural intra college fest named Flock in the nascent years of the institution.

== See also ==
- Indian Institute of Technology
- List of universities in India
