= Amita Kanekar =

Indian novelist

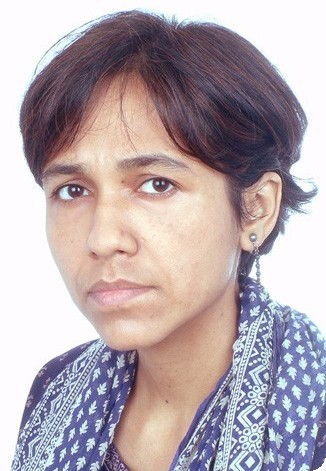
- Kanekar in 2006
- Occupations: Writer; historian
- Relatives: Mitra Bir (aunt); Madhav R. Bir (uncle)
- Writing career
- Years active: 2005–present

Amita Kanekar is an Indian writer and architectural historian, whose well-received debut novel A Spoke in the Wheel was published by HarperCollins Publishers and later again by Navayana. Kanekar's second book was a guidebook to Portuguese sea fort architecture of the Deccan, while her third was another novel, Fear of Lions, published by Hachette in 2019. She also writes essays and newspaper columns on architecture, history, and politics, and teaches architectural history and theory at the Goa College of Architecture.
