= Anish Sood =

Indian music producer, DJ and songwriter

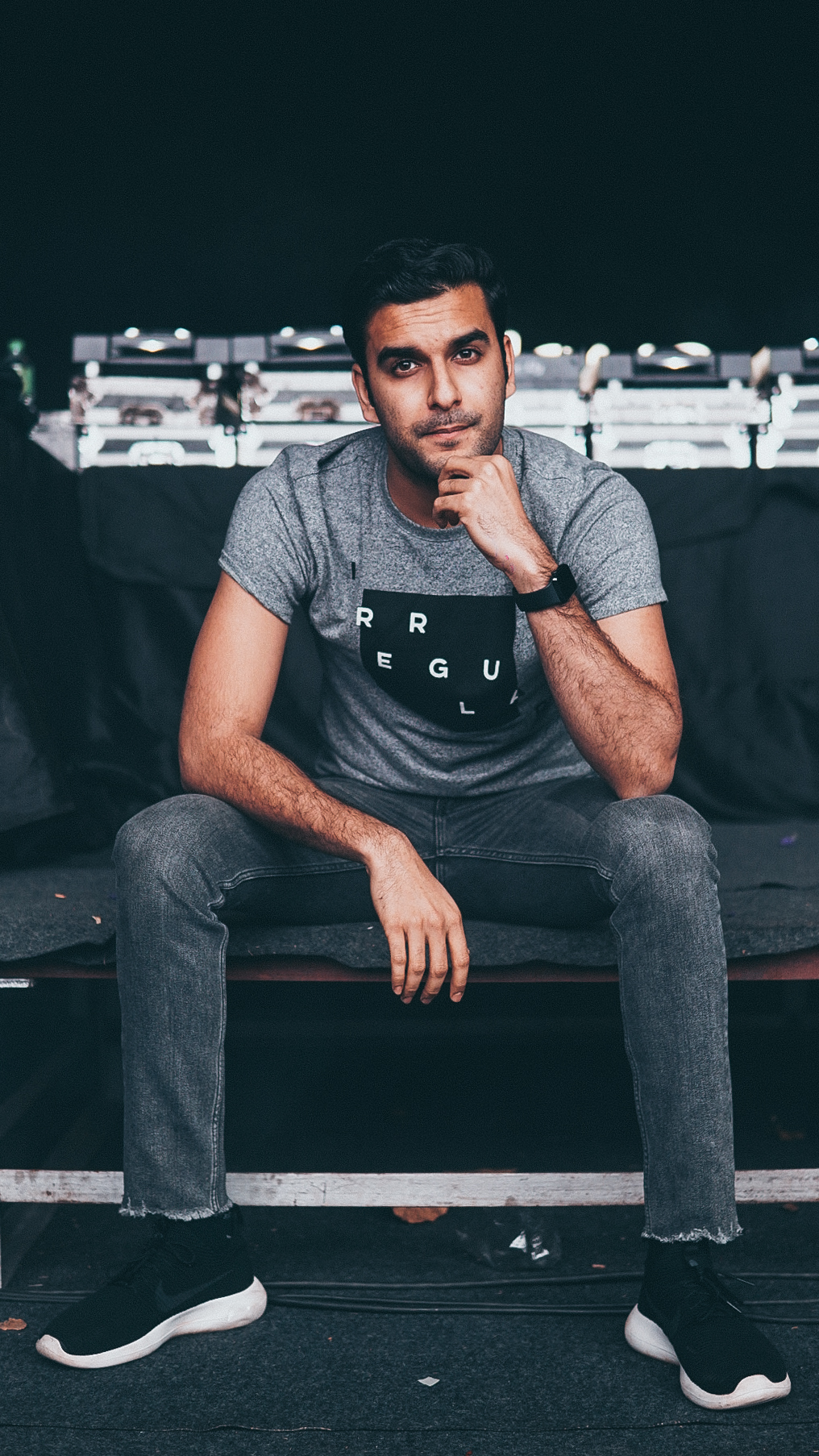
- Anish Sood Live at BIT Ranchi

Background information
- Also known as: Anyasa
- Born: Anish Sood; 22 November 1989 (age 36); Goa, India
- Education: Goa Engineering College (B.E.)
- Genres: House music; Deep house; Progressive house; Melodic house; Techno
- Occupations: Music producer; DJ; Songwriter
- Years active: 2008–present
- Labels: Anjunadeep, Class Action
- Website: anishsood.com

Anish Sood, also known by his alias, Anyasa (born 22 November 1989), is an Indian music producer, songwriter and DJ. He is currently signed to English deep house label Anjunadeep and released his debut Gaya EP as Anyasa in July 2021.

== Early life ==
Anish Sood was born and brought up in Goa, India. He attended high school in Vasco da Gama, Goa. Anish holds a bachelor's degree in Mechanical Engineering from Goa Engineering College. His father and uncle are guitar players and he started collecting cassettes and CDs at the age of 9. Anish's first exposure to electronic music was Armin van Buuren's A State of Trance podcast and he started DJing in high school at the age of 15, soon gaining popularity for the college parties he organized and performed at. He quickly moved on to playing local nightclubs in Goa and soon made regular nightclub and festival appearances.

He has been booked to play at major Indian festivals, including Sunburn Festival in Goa, NH7 Weekender and Enchanted Valley Carnival. He has performed alongside artists such as David Guetta, Kygo, Axwell and Ingrosso, Tiësto, Dimitri Vegas & Like Mike, Steve Aoki, Kshmr and Afrojack.

== Career ==
=== 2008–11: Early beginnings ===
Anish signed on a residency at a local club where he started booking and performing with talent from around the country. This is where he connected with Mumbai-based promoter Submerge who started booking him at shows around the country. In 2010, Anish entered the Sunburn Anthem remix contest along with his childhood friend Rishabh Joshi and their remix for Nadia Ali's Love Story won them a slot at Sunburn Festival. He released his debut international single in 2011 on Trance legend Marcel Woods's imprint Musical Madness.

=== 2012–13: Invasion Festival and Hello World Tours ===
Anish performed as direct support to David Guetta on his maiden India tour in March 2012 at Invasion Festival. His performance was widely acclaimed and this helped catapult him to the forefront of the Indian electronic scene. He subsequently supported David Guetta on all his Indian tours.

In April 2012, Anish released his first EP on Dutch artist Miss Nine's 925 Music label featuring vocals by Indian singer/songwriter Ramona Arena. He followed this up with another EP featuring Ramona titled "Hello World" and later released a single featuring British singer/songwriter Zoe Klinck titled "We Won't Stay".

In August 2013, Anish announced a 6 city tour in to promote his new single "Hello World" with Ramona Arena. They performed in New Delhi, Kolkata, Goa, Pune, Mumbai and Bangalore with Anish DJing and Ramona singing live.

=== 2014–16: Sunburn On Air, Superfly, Tomorrowland Unite ===
In April 2014, Anish won the prestigious MyFav Best House DJ and DJ Of The Year awards and was once again voted MyFav Best House DJ in 2015. In May 2014, he also launched a weekly podcast, Sunburn On Air in collaboration with Sunburn Festival. The podcast has featured guestmixes by artists such as Afrojack, Hardwell and MAKJ to name a few. The podcast was discontinued in 2016.

In April 2015, Anish collaborated with popular Indian singer Anushka Manchanda and upcoming indie producer Nanok to release "Superfly". The track peaked at #3 on the iTunes India chart.

In June 2015, Belgian dance music festival Tomorrowland hosted a live stream event in Mumbai and Mexico. The stream featured Martin Garrix, Armin Van Buuren and Dimitri Vegas and Like Mike. Anish Sood played a live opening set before the stream at the Sardar Vallabhbhai Patel Indoor Stadium in Mumbai.

On 13 December 2015, Anish performed alongside Hardwell at a free concert entitled "The World's Biggest Guestlist" in Mumbai. All the proceeds of the festival were donated to the Magic Bus Charity Project, which enables children from poor backgrounds to achieve better education in co-operation with the United We Are Foundation and Guestlist Events.

On 28 August 2016, Anish was the first electronic artist invited to perform at the renowned National Centre for the Performing Arts (India). Anish also performed at the debut Electric Daisy Carnival in New Delhi on 13 November 2016.

Towards the end of 2016 he released a remix of Autograf's Metaphysical which has since become one of his most successful releases to-date with over 700,000 plays on Spotify as well as being licensed in the OST for Ubisoft's video game Steep.

=== 2017–2020: Class Action, Future Perfect ===
Anish started 2017 with the launch of his own label "Class Action" and the single "Don't Stop" featuring vocals from Los Angeles-based singer/songwriter Charlie Sputnik. The track received widespread media attention and peaked at #6 on the Music Week Club Charts. He followed this up with another single titled "Going Under" this time featuring London based singer/songwriter Andy Wilson-Taylor.

Anish's single "Starry Night" featuring LA-based singer Zach Sorgen and Atlanta-based rapper Kelechi was released on 24 November accompanied by a music video shot on the Amalfi Coast. "Starry Night" won an award for Best Electronica/Dance Single at the Independent Music Awards in New York, thus making him the first Indian to win this award.

He also supported Norwegian DJ and producer Kygo on his debut India tour and performed at It's The Ship, Singapore and Womb, Tokyo.

In February 2018, Anish released the single "Castles" featuring vocals by Canadian-Indo singer Jonita Gandhi. The track was accompanied by a music video shot in Cappadocia.

Anish released two singles in 2020 with Indian American singer/songwriter Lisa Mishra titled 'Running Back To You' and French songwriter Charlie Sputnik titled 'Say My Name'.

On 18 July 2020, Anish Sood, Ritviz and Nucleya conducted an online virtual concert named retroFuture.

=== 2021-Present: Anyasa, Anjunadeep ===
In July 2021, Anish rebranded his artist project to Anyasa which translates to "spontaneous and effortless" in Sanskrit. He signed with English deep house label Anjunadeep and is the first Indian artist signed to the label. DJ Mag included him in its "12 emerging artists to watch" list in October 2021.

== Awards and nominations ==
Year	Awards	Category	Recipient	Outcome	Ref(s)
2014	MyFav Awards	DJ Of The Year	Anish Sood	Won	
2016	Global Indian Music Awards	Best Electronica Single	Anish Sood, Nanok - Superfly feat. Anushka Manchanda	Nominated	
2018	Independent Music Awards	Dance/Electronica Song	Anish Sood - Starry Night feat. Zach Sorgen & Kelechi	Won	

Anish has also been featured on GQ India's 50 best dressed Indian men list in 2014, 2015 and 2016.

== Other ventures ==
Anish has endorsed American denim brand Levi Strauss & Co. in India since 2015. He has carried out a wide range of promotional activities for them including visiting and reviewing Coachella Valley Music and Arts Festival.

Sood is also very active in the international dance music conference circuit and he was the curator for Amsterdam Dance Event's Global Sessions in Mumbai. He has also been invited to speak at International Music Summit and Tokyo Dance Music Event.

In August 2017 he was invited to speak at TEDxGECSalon (the TEDx Salon event of his alma mater, Goa Engineering College).

== Discography ==
=== EPs ===
- Anish Sood, Ramona Arena – Wanna Be Your Only Love [925 Music] (2012)
- Anish Sood, Ramona Arena – Hello World [925 Music] (2013)
- Anyasa – Gaya EP [Anjunadeep] (2021)
- Anyasa – Athena EP [Anjunadeep] (2022)
- Anyasa – Apollo EP [Anjunadeep] (2023)

=== Singles ===
- Anish Sood & Beta 5 – Catapult [Musical Madness] (2011)
- Anish Sood – What She Wants (2013)
- Anish Sood – We Won't Stay feat. Zoë Klinck (2014)
- Anish Sood, Nanok – Superfly feat. Anushka Manchanda (2015)
- Anish Sood, Charlie Sputnik – Don't Stop [Class Action] (2017)
- Anish Sood – Going Under feat. Andy Wilson-Taylor [Class Action] (2017)
- Anish Sood – Starry Night feat. Zach Sorgen & Kelechi [Class Action] (2017)
- Anish Sood – Castles feat. Jonita Gandhi [Class Action] (2018)
- Anish Sood – Mountain Of A Man feat. TRISHES & TMPO [Class Action] (2018)
- Anish Sood – Running Back To You feat. Lisa Mishra [Class Action] (2020)
- Anish Sood – Say My Name feat. Charlie Sputnik [Class Action] (2020)
- Anyasa - Closure feat. Coulson [Anjunadeep] (2024)

=== Remixes ===
- Nadia Ali – Love Story (Anish Sood & Rishabh Joshi Remix) [Times Music] (2010)
- Teenu Arora feat. Megha – Dreams (Anish Sood Remix) [Pearlicka Records] (2012)
- Mazzr feat. Kadri Gopalnath – Tillana (Anish Sood Remix) [System Recordings] (2013)
- Jimmy Kennedy, Aneesh Gera feat. Pryce Oliver – Once in a Lifetime (Anish Sood Remix) [Weekend Millionaires] (2014)
- Sandunes feat. Nicholson – Slybounce (Anish Sood Remix) [High Chai Recordings] (2014)
- Oozeundat - The Feud (Anish Sood Remix) [Qilla Records] (2015)
- Autograf feat. Janelle Kroll - Metaphysical (Anish Sood Remix) [Counter Records] (2016)
- Autograf feat. Victoria Zaro - Simple (Anish Sood Remix) [Spinnin Records] (2017)
- Stalvart – Wobble Disko (Anish Sood Remix) [Class Action] (2020)
- Sixth Ocean – Swerve (Anish Sood Remix) [Class Action] (2020)
- Ritviz - Thandi Hawa (Anish Sood Remix) (2020)
- Mali – Age Of Limbo (Anish Sood Remix) [Class Action] (2020)
- Marsh & Wassu feat. Mariel Beausejour - Forgiveness (Anyasa Remix) [Anjunadeep] (2023)
- Eelke Kleijn - Time Machine (Anyasa Remix) [Days Like Nights] (2024)
