= Farmagudi =

- Suburb
- Location in Goa, India Farmagudi (India)
- Coordinates: 15.416°N 73.984°E
- Country: India
- State: Ponda, Goa
- District: South Goa

Languages
  - Official: Konkani
- Time zone: UTC+5:30 (IST)
- Vehicle registration: GA
- Website: goa.gov.in

Farmagudi is a suburb of Ponda town in Goa, India. It falls under the jurisdiction of the Ponda taluka. Situated on a plateau, it is located 3 km away from the main Ponda City, on the way towards Panjim. Farmagudi is home to several educational institutions, including the (GVM's) Higher Secondary School, GVM's College of Commerce & Economics, Ponda Education Society's Higher Secondary School, and the Goa Engineering College, National Institute of Technology Goa, and IIT Goa.
