= Manohar Parrikar =

Indian politician (1955–2019)

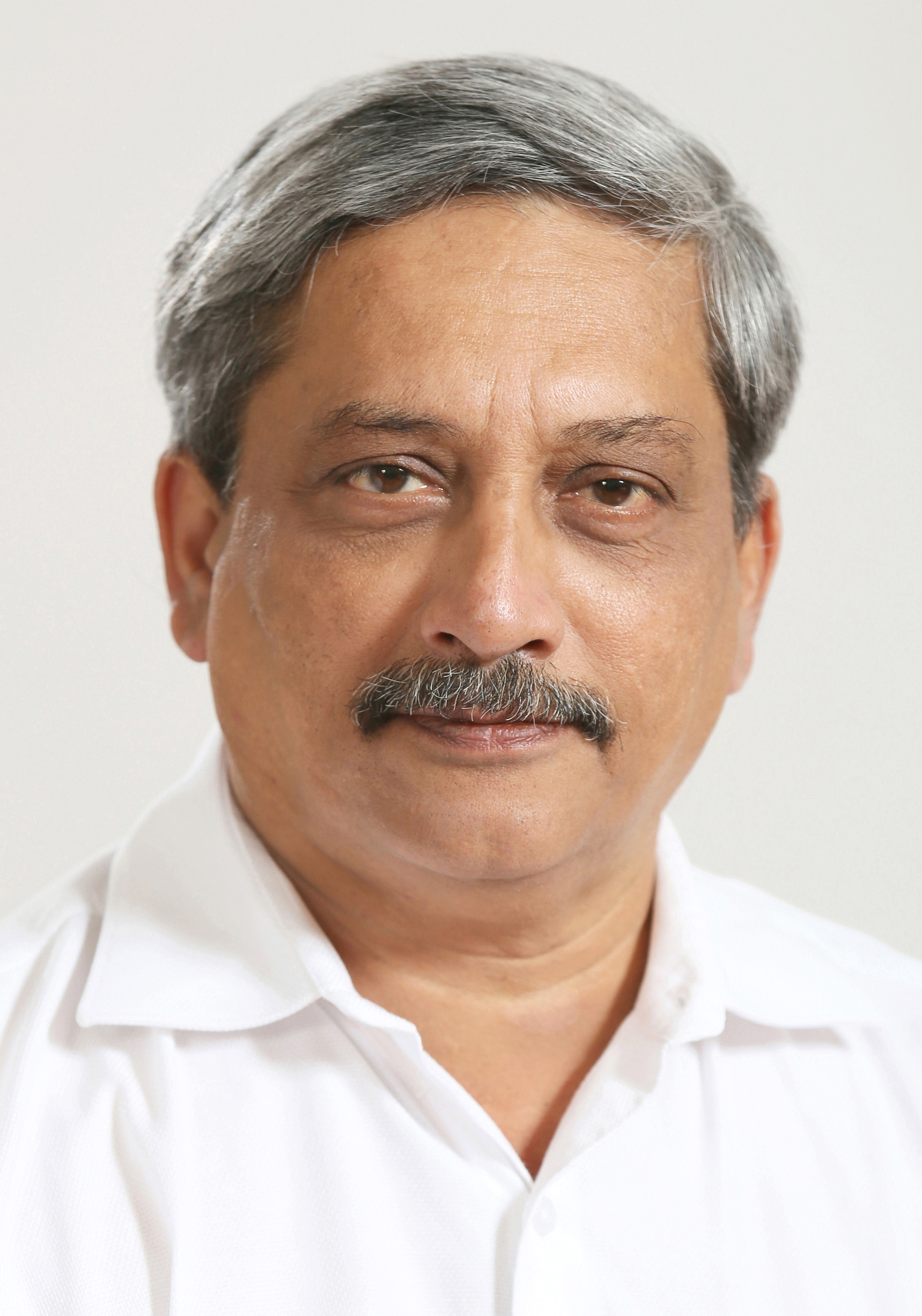
- Official portrait, 2014

8th Chief Minister of Goa
- In office 14 March 2017 – 17 March 2019
- Governor: Mridula Sinha
- Preceded by: Laxmikant Parsekar
- Succeeded by: Pramod Sawant
- In office 9 March 2012 – 8 November 2014
- Governor: Bharat Vir Wanchoo; Margaret Alva; Mridula Sinha
- Deputy: Francis D'Souza
- Preceded by: Digambar Kamat
- Succeeded by: Laxmikant Parsekar
- In office 24 October 2000 – 2 February 2005
- Governor: Mohammed Fazal; Kidar Nath Sahani; S. C. Jamir
- Deputy: Ravi Naik
- Preceded by: Francisco Sardinha
- Succeeded by: Pratapsingh Rane

27th Union Minister of Defence
- In office 9 November 2014 – 13 March 2017
- Prime Minister: Narendra Modi
- Preceded by: Arun Jaitley
- Succeeded by: Arun Jaitley

Member of Goa Legislative Assembly
- In office 28 August 2017 – 17 March 2019
- Preceded by: Sidharth Kuncalienker
- Succeeded by: Atanasio Monserrate
- Constituency: Panaji
- In office 1994–2014
- Preceded by: Joan Baptista Florino Gonsalves
- Succeeded by: Sidharth Kuncalienker
- Constituency: Panaji

Member of Parliament, Rajya Sabha
- In office 26 November 2014 – 2 September 2017
- Preceded by: Kusum Rai
- Succeeded by: Hardeep Singh Puri
- Constituency: Uttar Pradesh

Personal details
- Born: Manohar Gopalkrishna Prabhu Parrikar; 13 December 1955 Mapuçá, Goa, Portuguese India
- Died: 17 March 2019 (aged 63) Panaji, Goa, India
- Cause of death: Pancreatic cancer
- Party: Bharatiya Janata Party (since 1980s)
- Spouse: Medha Parrikar (died 2001)
- Education: Loyola High School
- Alma mater: IIT Bombay (1978)
- Occupation: Engineer; politician
- Awards: Padma Bhushan (2020)

Manohar Gopalkrishna Prabhu Parrikar (13 December 1955 – 17 March 2019) was an Indian politician and a member of the Bharatiya Janata Party who served as the eighth Chief Minister of Goa, going on to serve a total of four times between 2000 and 2019. He also served as the Union Minister of Defence from 2014 to 2017. In 2020, he was posthumously awarded the Padma Bhushan, the third-highest civilian award, by the Government of India.

Parrikar proposed Narendra Modi as the prime ministerial candidate at the 2013 BJP parliamentary elections convention in Goa. He then served in the National Democratic Alliance government under Prime Minister Modi as Defence Minister of India from 2014 to 2017. He was a member of the Rajya Sabha from Uttar Pradesh from 2014 to 2017.

He was the first IIT alumnus to serve as MLA of an Indian state, the first IITian to become the Chief Minister of a state in India, the first Goan to become a cabinet-rank minister at the Centre, and also the first Chief Minister of a state to continue in office for over a year despite being diagnosed with terminal-stage cancer.

== Early life and education ==
Manohar Gopalkrishna Prabhu Parrikar was born on 13 December 1955, to the Gaud Saraswat Brahmin (GSB) family of Gopal Krishna Parrikar and Radhabai Parrikar in Mapuçá, Portuguese Goa. He studied at Loyola High School in Margao. Parrikar completed his Secondary School Certificate at G. S. Amonkar Vidya Mandir, Mapusa, which was previously known as New Goa High School. He completed his primary education in Marathi and went on to graduate in Metallurgical Engineering from the Indian Institute of Technology, Bombay (IIT Bombay), in 1978. He was awarded the Distinguished Alumnus Award by IIT Bombay in 2001.

== Political career ==
Parrikar served as Chief Minister of Goa, holding the office four times (from 2000 to 2005, 2012 to 2014, and lastly from 2017 to 2019). He also served as the Union Minister of Defence from October 2014 to March 2017.

=== Early career ===
Parrikar joined the Rashtriya Swayamsevak Sangh (RSS) at a young age and became a mukhya shikshak (chief instructor) in the final years of his schooling. After graduating from IIT, he resumed RSS work in Mapusa while maintaining a private business, and became a sanghchalak (local director) at the age of 26. He was active in the RSS's North Goa unit, becoming a key organiser of the Ram Janmabhoomi movement. He was seconded by RSS to Bharatiya Janata Party (BJP) with the objective of fighting the Maharashtrawadi Gomantak Party. He is sometimes described as having been a pracharak of the RSS.

=== Chief Minister of Goa (2000–05), (2012–14) ===
As a member of the BJP, Parrikar was elected to the Legislative Assembly of Goa in 1994. He was leader of the opposition from June to November 1999. He successfully contested the election to become Chief Minister of Goa for the first time on 24 October 2000, but his tenure lasted only until 27 February 2002. In 2001, the Parrikar government had turned over fifty-one government primary schools in rural areas to Vidya Bharati, the educational wing of the Hindu nationalist group Sangh Parivar, inviting criticism from certain educationists.

On 5 June 2002, he was re-elected and served another term as Chief Minister. On 29 January 2005, his government was reduced to a minority in the Assembly after four BJP MLAs resigned from the House. Pratapsing Rane of the Indian National Congress would subsequently replace Parrikar as Chief Minister.

In 2007, the Parrikar led BJP was defeated in the Goa state elections by the Congress led by Digambar Kamat. BJP and their party-allies won twenty-four seats against the Congress' nine in the Goa Assembly Elections held in March 2012. After coming to power on the promise of getting rid of casinos from the state, in 2014 Parrikar granted permanent licenses to casinos in Goa.

In 2014, Parrikar drew criticism for approving a junket costing at least ₹8.9 million (equivalent to ₹14 million or US$150,000 in 2023) for six MLAs from the ruling party, including three ministers, to attend the FIFA World Cup in Brazil. The Indian National Congress termed the trip "wasteful expenditure" and criticized the lack of other government officials or soccer experts in the delegation.

=== Union Minister for Defence (2014–17) ===
In the 2014 general elections, BJP won both the Lok Sabha seats in Goa. Parrikar was reluctant to leave Goa and move to Delhi in November 2014, by his own admission but was persuaded by Prime Minister Narendra Modi to join central government.

Parrikar was preceded by Laxmikant Parsekar as Goa's CM. Parrikar had represented the Panaji constituency in the Goa Legislative Assembly when he was a player in the state politics.

In November 2014, Parrikar was chosen as the Minister of Defence replacing Arun Jaitley, who, till then, held additional charge of the Ministry. His entry into the parliament was facilitated by choosing him as the party's candidate for the elected Rajya Sabha seat from Uttar Pradesh.

=== Chief Minister of Goa (2017–19) ===
On 14 March 2017, Parrikar was sworn in as Chief Minister of Goa. Goa Forward Party led by Vijai Sardesai, one of the parties who allied with BJP in Goa after election results were announced, had said that it would extend support to the BJP only if Parrikar was brought back to the state as Chief Minister.

== Reception ==
In 2001, the Parrikar government turned over fifty-one government primary schools in rural areas to Vidya Bharati, the educational wing of the Sangh Parivar, inviting criticism from educationists. He also drew criticism for approving a junket costing at least ₹8.9 million (equivalent to ₹14 million or US$150,000 in 2023) for six government MLAs from the ruling party, including three ministers, to attend the 2014 FIFA World Cup in Brazil. The Indian National Congress termed the trip "wasteful expenditure" and criticized the lack of other government officials or football experts in the delegation.

Parrikar often made remarks of controversial nature. In wake of the debate on religious intolerance in India and actor Aamir Khan stating that his wife Kiran Rao had asked to move out of India, Parrikar made a controversial remark that "if anyone speaks like this, he has to be taught a lesson of his life". He later clarified that he had not targeted any specific individual. In August 2016, Parrikar stated that going to Pakistan is the same thing as "going to hell". In November 2016, Parrikar, while serving as Minister of Defence of India, raised a question about why India should bind itself to the no first use policy.

In 2019, an audio tape of Poriem MLA Vishwajit Rane surfaced where he spoke to an unknown person claiming that the Dassault Rafale Aircraft deal papers were in then Chief Minister Manohar Parrikar's bedroom. Congress Leader Rahul Gandhi attempted to play the alleged audio tape in the Lok Sabha but was not allowed to do so.

== Illness and death ==
During March–June 2018, Parrikar was undergoing treatment for what would turn out to be pancreatic cancer at Memorial Sloan Kettering Cancer Center in New York, USA. He returned to India and in September was admitted in the AIIMS, Delhi for treatment. On 27 October 2018, the Government of Goa announced that Parrikar had pancreatic cancer.

He died on 17 March 2019 at the age of 63 from pancreatic cancer at his residence in Panaji. His death was announced by the President of India, Ram Nath Kovind in a tweet condoling his death. His death was condoled by PM Narendra Modi, HM Rajnath Singh, BJP president Amit Shah, INC president Rahul Gandhi, and several other political leaders from all over Goa and India.

On the evening of 18 March, Parrikar was cremated with full state honours at Miramar in Panaji.

People close to the Parrikar family stated that he kept his children away from politics.

== Biography ==
In June 2020, a biography titled An Extraordinary Life: A Biography of Manohar Parrikar was published by Penguin Random House India. The book, written by journalists Sadguru Patil and Mayabhushan Nagvenkar, documents Parrikar's life and political career.

== Awards ==
- 2020: Padma Bhushan by Government of India
- 2018: Honorary Doctorate by National Institute of Technology Goa on 28 September 2018.
- 2012: CNN-IBN Indian of the Year in politics category
- 2001: Distinguished Alumnus Award IIT-Mumbai

== Legacy ==
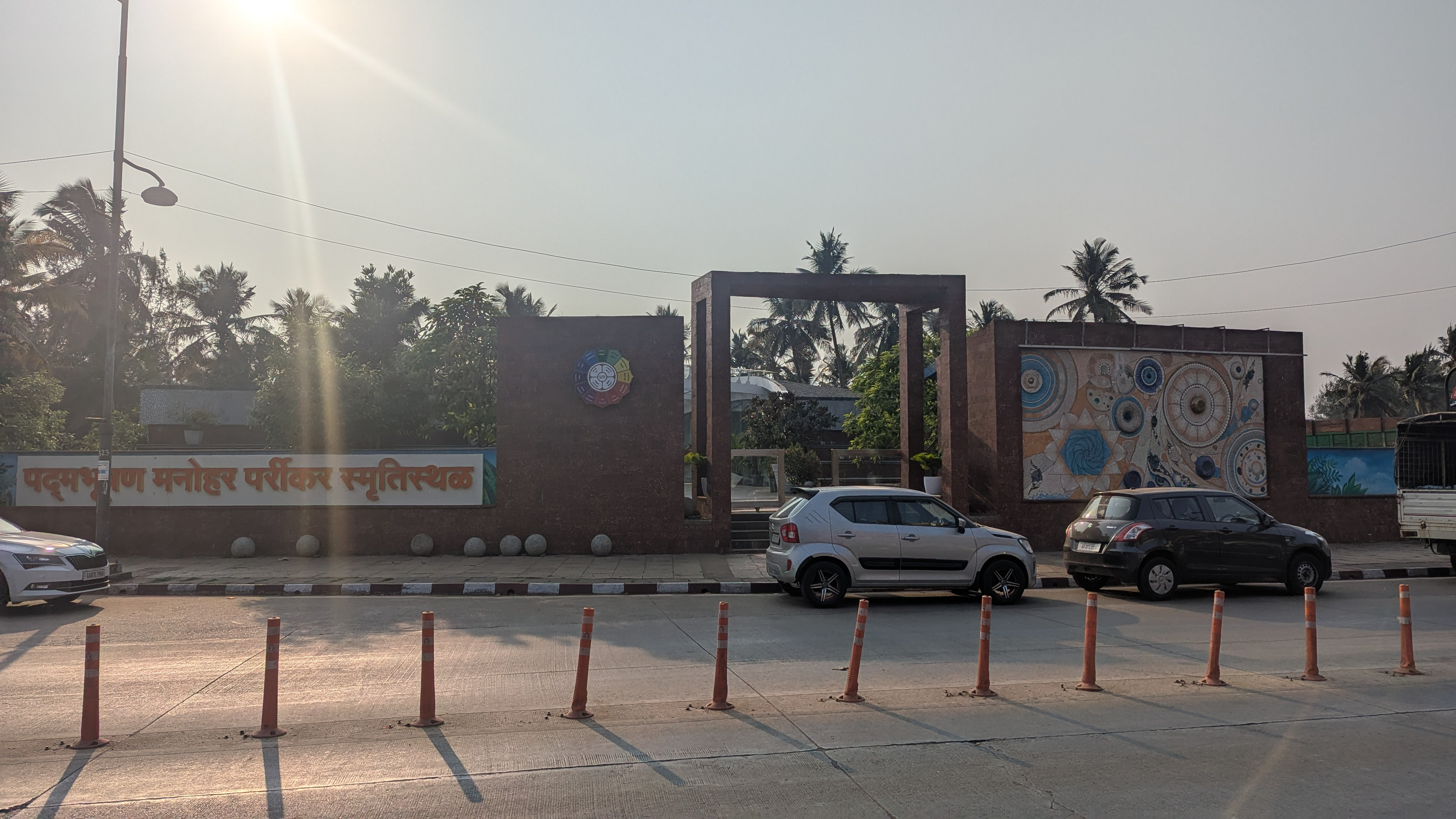
Manohar Parrikar Smriti Sthal, memorial for Manohar Parrikar, Miramar, Panaji, Goa

In 2019, it was announced that a part of the Miramar beach would be converted to a memorial for Parrikar, featuring a library, a meditation hall, an audio-visual room and a souvenir shop. The memorial is named The Manohar Parrikar Smriti Sthal.

The Indian Institute for Defense Studies and Analyses was renamed the Manohar Parrikar Institute for Defense Studies and Analyses in February 2020.

In December 2022, the new international airport at Mopa, Goa was named Manohar International Airport.

Political offices
| Preceded by Francisco Sardinha | Chief Minister of Goa; 2000–2005 | Succeeded by Pratapsingh Rane |
| Preceded by Digambar Kamat | Chief Minister of Goa; 2012–2014 | Succeeded by Laxmikant Parsekar |
| Preceded by Arun Jaitley | Minister of Defence; 2014–2017 | Succeeded by Arun Jaitley |
| Preceded by Laxmikant Parsekar | Chief Minister of Goa; 2017–2019 | Succeeded by Pramod Sawant |
