= Goa Engineering College =

Government engineering college in Goa, India

Goa College of Engineering
- Motto: Work is worship
- Type: Public
- Established: 1967
- Affiliations: Goa University
- Principal: Dr. Krupashankara Mysore Sethuram
- Students: 2200
- Undergraduates: 1900 (2015)
- Postgraduates: 300 (2015)
- Location: Bhausaheb Bandodkar Technical Education Complex, Farmagudi, Goa, 403 401, India; 15°25′23″N 73°58′48″E
- Campus: Semi-urban, 300 acres (1.2 km^{2})
- Language: English
- Website: gec.ac.in

Goa Engineering College or Goa College of Engineering (abbreviated and colloquially referred to as GEC) is a public college in Goa, India, offering courses in engineering disciplines and affiliated to Goa University. Founded in 1967 and situated at Farmagudi plateau, Ponda, it is the oldest engineering college in Goa, with over 2,200 students.

== Academics ==
=== Academic programmes ===
The college started in 1967 with undergraduate courses in mechanical, civil, and electrical engineering. The electronics and telecommunications course was introduced in 1982, computer science in 1988, information technology in 2001, and mining in 2011. In 2022, a course in electronics in VLSI was introduced in recognition of the growing semiconductor industry in India. All courses in the college are affiliated to Goa University.

It currently has eight masters programmes, the duration of each being two years:

Sr. no.	Course	Department	Year of commencement
1	Foundation engineering	Civil engineering	1986
2	Industrial engineering (part-time)	Mechanical engineering	1986
3	Microelectronics	Electronics and telecommunication engineering	2008
4	Electronics communication and instrumentation engineering	Electronics and telecommunication engineering	2008
5	Power and energy engineering	Electrical and electronics engineering	2010
6	Computer engineering	Computer engineering	2011
7	Industrial automation and radio frequency engineering	Electronics and telecommunication engineering	2012–13
8	Structural engineering	Civil engineering	2016
9	IT and engineering	Information technology	2017–18
10	VLSI engineering	VLSI ENGINEERING	2022

The college is recognized as a research institute under Goa University. The affiliation to Ph.D. programs in civil, mechanical, electrical and electronics, computer science and engineering, and electronics and telecommunication engineering are recognized from academic year 2014–15 onwards.

The college has a memorandum of understanding with IIT Bombay, and many of its faculty go there to pursue Ph.D. degrees.

The Farmagudi campus also houses the Indian Institute of Technology Goa.

=== Accreditation and ranking ===
The National Board of Accreditation has accredited six branches of the college – the computer, mechanical, civil, electrical and electronics, information technology, and electronics and telecommunications branches. This means the academic curriculum and the teaching-learning process is of a good standard, with adequate infrastructure and faculty, acceptable to the All India Council of Technical Education.

A study conducted in 2006 by the magazine Dataquest India ranked the college at 75th in India. In Dataquest's 2011 survey the college was unranked.

As part of the golden jubilee celebrations, it was announced that the college would soon house an incubation centre for boosting entrepreneurship on campus.

== Campus ==
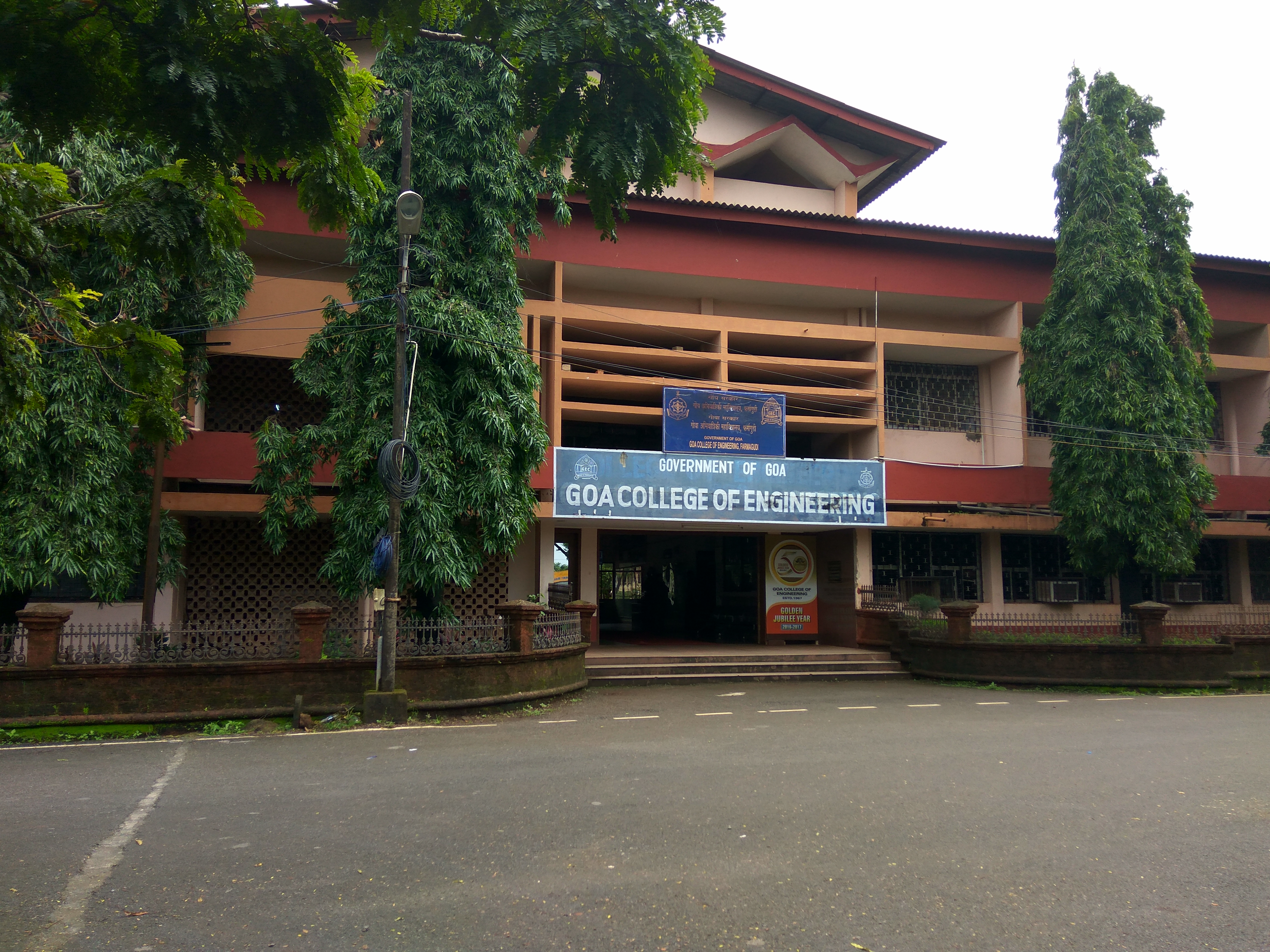
Goa Engineering College main building

The college has one of the largest libraries in the state. It is home to over 86,000 books, journals, and magazines, catering to all the subjects taught in the college. The library has a multimedia section that houses electronic modes of information such as encyclopedias. The library has a book bank facility with which students can obtain books for the entire year and return after the completion of the year, by paying a small fee.

With the largest campus in Goa, spread well over 285 acres atop Farmagudi hill, the college has five boys' and two girls' hostels, staff housing, and guest house facilities for visiting faculty and students. The campus also hosts IIT Goa and NIT Goa until they get their permanent campus. The campus also has bicycles, donated by the alumni, for use by the staff and students.

Besides the main canteen and multiple mess facilities, the college has small stalls and a restaurant that are frequented by students. The campus shopping complex has a restaurant, as well as shops that cater to student needs ranging from photocopying to stationery and other day-to-day needs. The campus has a post office and a computer center.

The college gymkhana houses a power gym, which is accessible to students during non-working hours. There is an indoor badminton court, a basketball court, and a full-length natural grass football ground that can be used as a cricket field.

Notably, the Electronics and Telecommunications branch features a robotic arm – the KUKA KR-16 Industrial Robot, used in assembly lines across many industries, for training its students.

== Student life ==
=== Student clubs and associations ===
The students of Goa Engineering College call themselves Engicos. However, not all post-graduate students identify themselves with this term.

The college has many active clubs:

- The college has a Nature Club which organizes tree planting programmes in the surrounding regions and organizes treks to locations in Goa.
- The college Photography Club has been organizing Photoflare, an international photography festival, since 2010.
- The college Quiz Club organizes quizzes for the college events.
- The college Music Club conducts workshops and organizes open mike sessions at the college's festivals. It has its own music room with equipment in the Mining Department.
- The college Literary and Debate Club organizes many small activities and helps organize TEDxGEC.
- The college has a Coding Club.
- The college Drama (Theatre) Club was one of the oldest clubs, and has been restarted after a gap of almost seven years (in 2018).
- The college students founded the Astronomy Club in 2018, with the maiden event hosting Dr Vithal Tilvi, who discovered the furthest known galaxy in the Universe in 2013.
- The college also has active student chapters of the IEEE, CSI, Goa Technology Association (GTA) and FSAI (Fire and Security Association of India).
- The college also had a Robotics club and a Linux User Group (which hosted Stallman in 2003).
- The college Coder's Club has been organizing various coding events and competitions, while developing college projects like the Tandav and Spectrum Website.
- The college has a new Robotics Club called ARM Society Of GEC (founded 2022) . It hosts workshops, talk sessions for students in and out of college. They also assisted in the organization of events like The Goa International Robotics Festival & Vibrant Goa-Global Tech Summit in 2023.

Student associations, based on their departments, are as follows:

- MESA – Mechanical Engineering Students Association
- ENEXSA – Electrical and Electronics Engineering Students Association (previously known as ELECTRA)
- ACES – Association of Civil Engineering Students
- CURSOR – Association of Computer Engineering Students
- INTENSA – Information Technology Students Association
- ASSETS – Association of Electronics and Telecommunications Engineering Students
- MINESCO – Mining Engineering Students Council

These associations conduct events, technical and non-technical, once or twice per semester. They also come together to organise Spectrum, the college's technical festival.

The students also celebrate religious festivals Ganesh Chaturthi and Christmas every year on the campus.

=== Cultural events ===
==== Happenings ====
Happenings is the cultural festival organized by the college. Started in 1981, it is officially the oldest college festival in Goa.

In 2009, two fresh and famous bands performed for the rock show, namely Bhayanak Maut and Reverse Polarity, both from Mumbai.

Happenings 2019, which was held on 16 and 17 March 2019 witnessed one of the biggest Pronites in its history, with a performance of Emiway Bantai and second day DJ night featured one of India's top DJ duo the Progressive Brothers.

==== Spectrum ====
Spectrum is the technical festival organized by the college. It was started in 2016, after a decision to merge the technical events organized by the individual student associations of each department.

Spectrum 2017 Pronite featured Sapan Verma and Sorabh Pant from the comedy group EIC.

Spectrum 2018 Pronite was held in association with Sunburn and featured Sartek and The Unknown.

==== Tandav ====
Tandav is an annual inter-departmental cultural and sports event, in which all branches of the college compete across various events for a trophy.

==== TEDxGEC ====
TEDxGEC is Goa's second TEDx event and was started in 2016. Its first event featured four eminent personalities: Kanan Tandi, an expert in body language; Gaurav Padte, a social worker, awarded by the Prime Minister Narendra Modi for his work in cleaning up the Fatorda Stadium; Marietta Rodrigues e D'Souza, a clinical psychologist and counsellor from Sharada Mandir School, who spoke about teenage love; and Somu Rao, President of Goa Science Forum and Former National Secretary of Federation of Indian Rationalists Associations, who spoke about godmen and rationality.

Their second event open to the general public was a Salon event titled "TEDxGECSalon: ARTiculate". Held in 2017, it featured alumni DJ Anish Sood and filmmaker Aditya Jambhale, along with noted artist Dr Subodh Kerkar.

==== Other notable events ====
- Richard M Stallman, founder of the GNU Project and the Free Software Foundation, visited the college Linux User Group in November 2001.
- The college celebrated its golden jubilee year in 2016–2017. A clock tower, funded by alumni, was erected on this occasion.
- AICSSYC (All India IEEE Computer Society Students and Young Professionals Congress) 2018 was hosted by IEEE GEC Chapter.

== Notable people ==
=== Notable alumni ===
- Aisha de Sequeira, co-head of Morgan Stanley India from 2013 through 2020.
- Anish Sood, DJ and EDM producer
- Cruz Silva, MLA of Velim constituency.
- Sameer Naik, founders of NextBiT Computing Pvt Ltd. The company was, in 2009, voted on the list of top 25 emerging technology companies in India
- Sidharth Kuncalienker, politician, ex-MLA of Panjim constituency
- Shikha Pandey, cricketer
- Viriato Fernandes, Indian Navy captain and Member of Parliament

=== List of principals ===
- Vivek Kamat (2009–2013)
- R.B. Lohani (2013–2014)
- Vinayak N. Shet (2014–2018)
- Dr. Krupashankara Mysore Sethuram (2018–2021)
- R.B. Lohani (2021–2023)
- Dr. Krupashankara Mysore Sethuram (2023 onwards)

== Gallery ==
Life in GEC

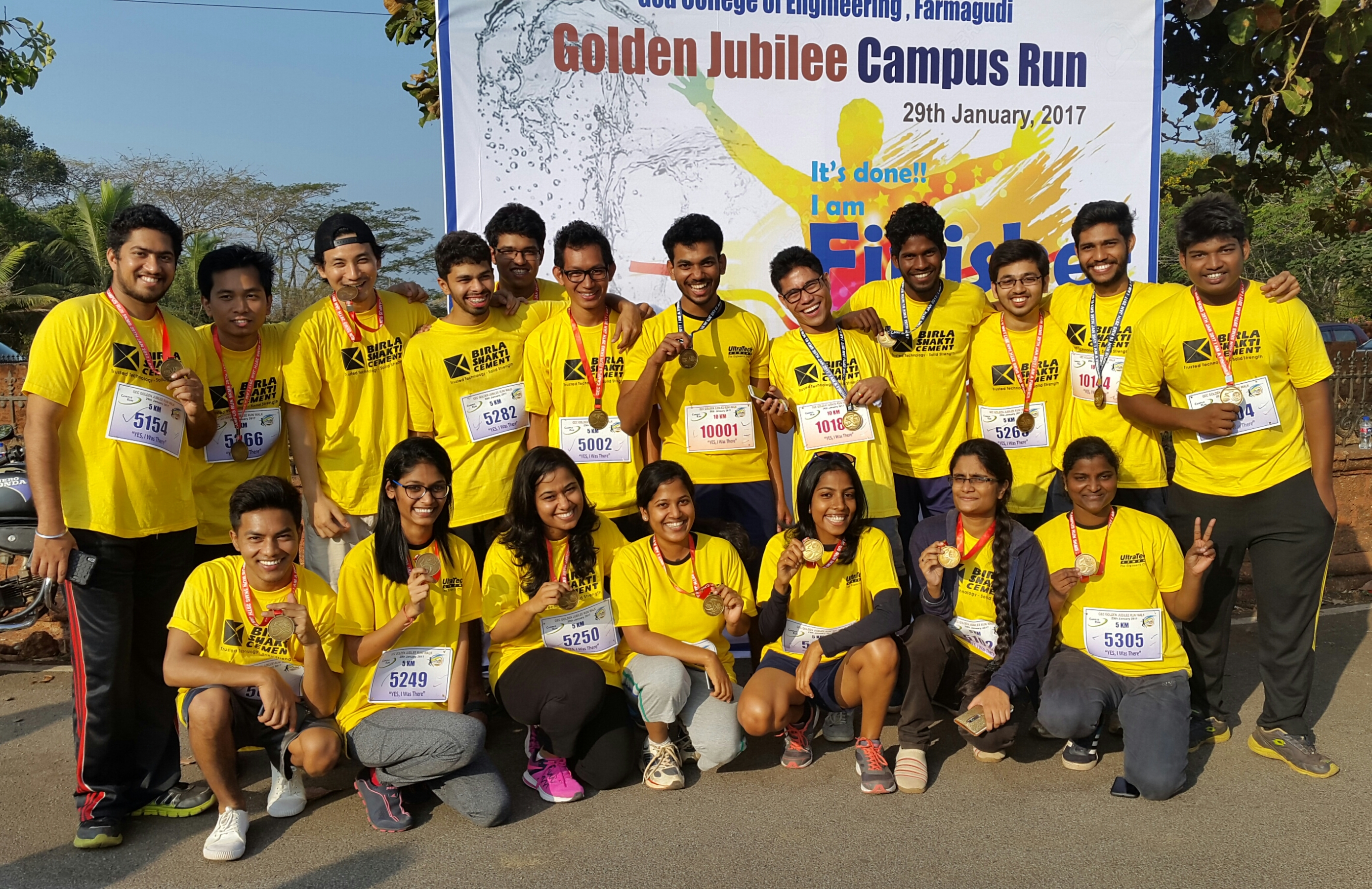
Students posing with medals after the Golden Jubilee Run

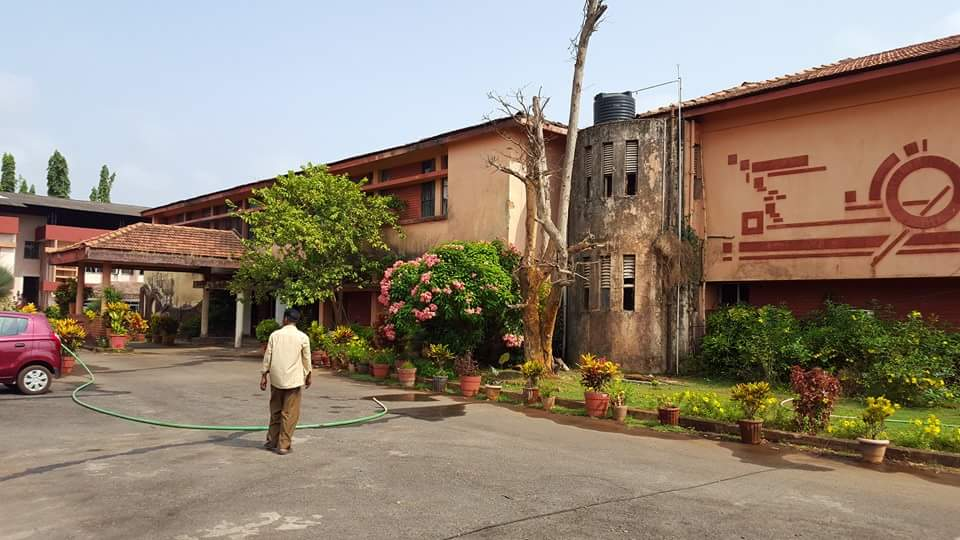
Library

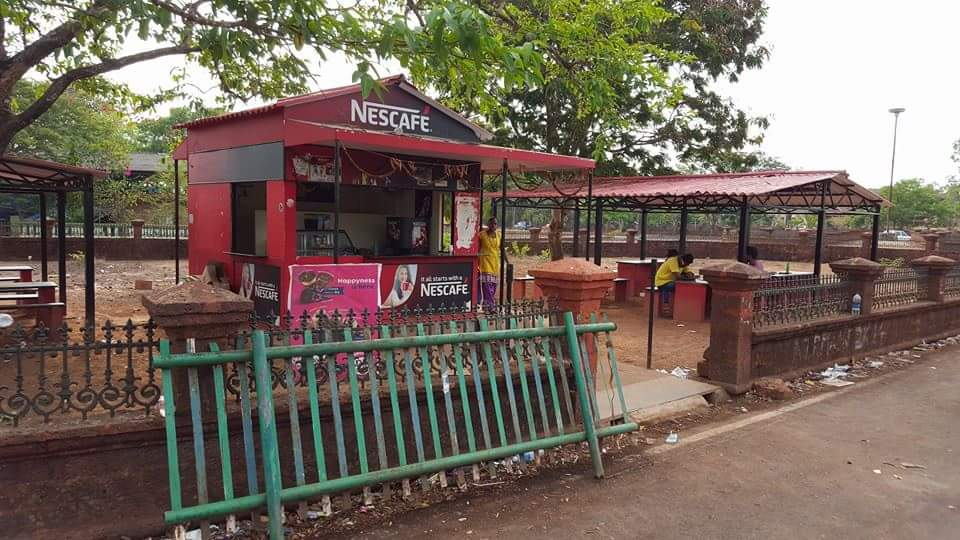
Nescafe on campus

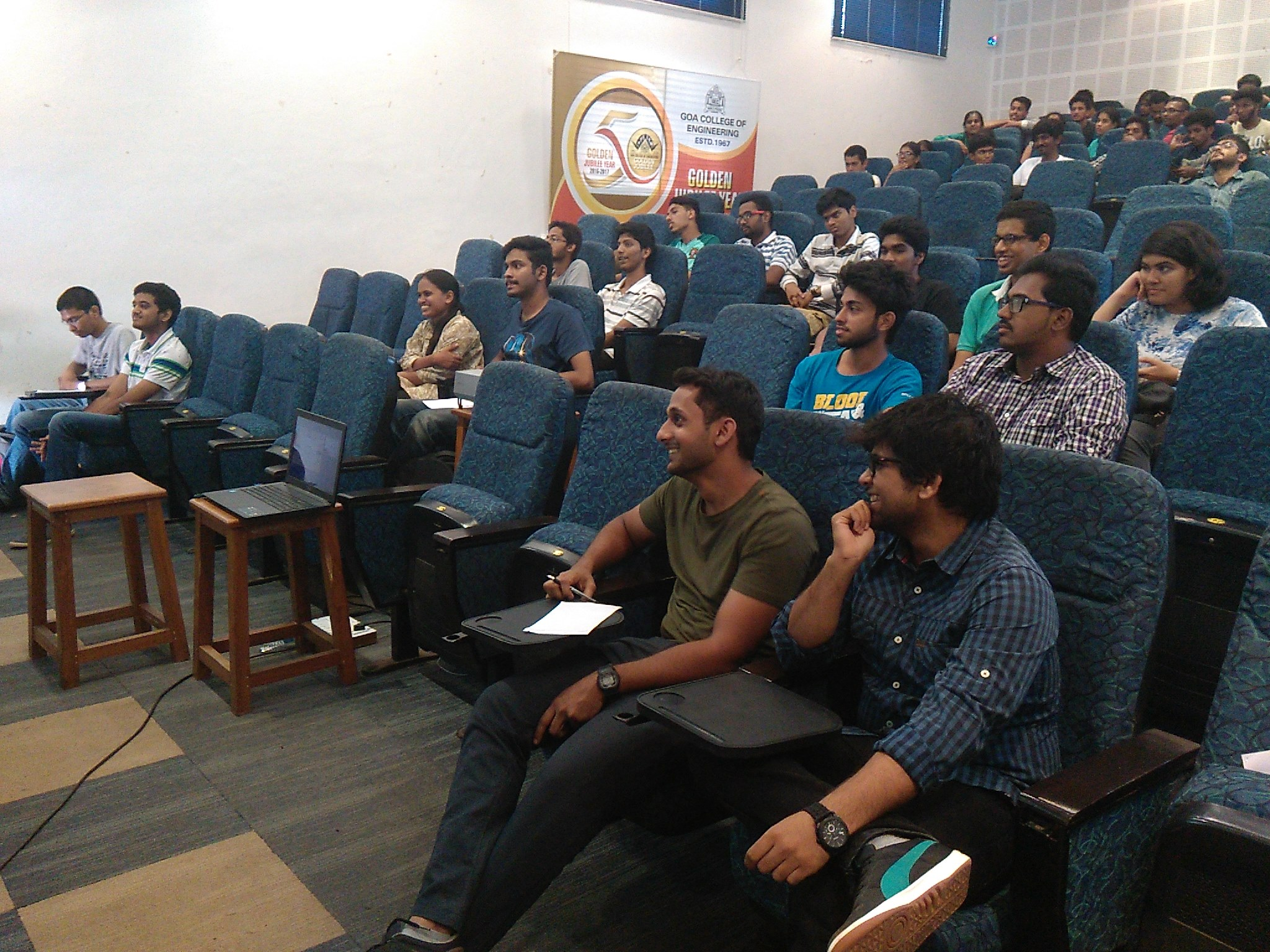
Quiz on campus

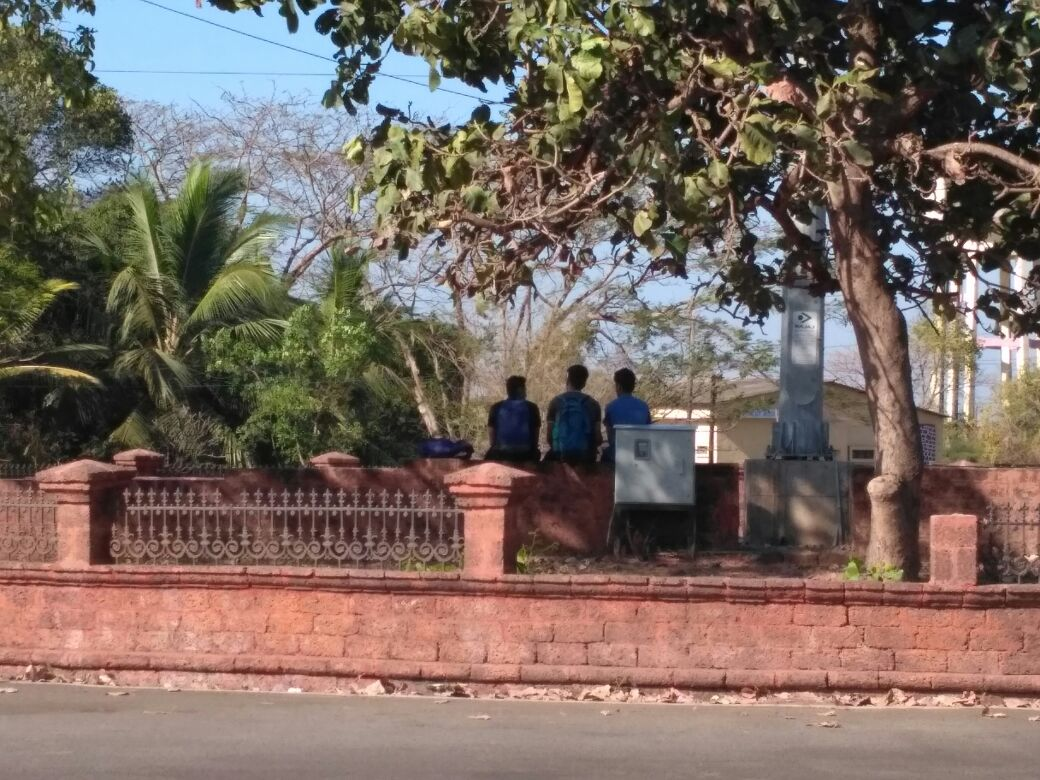
Students relaxing

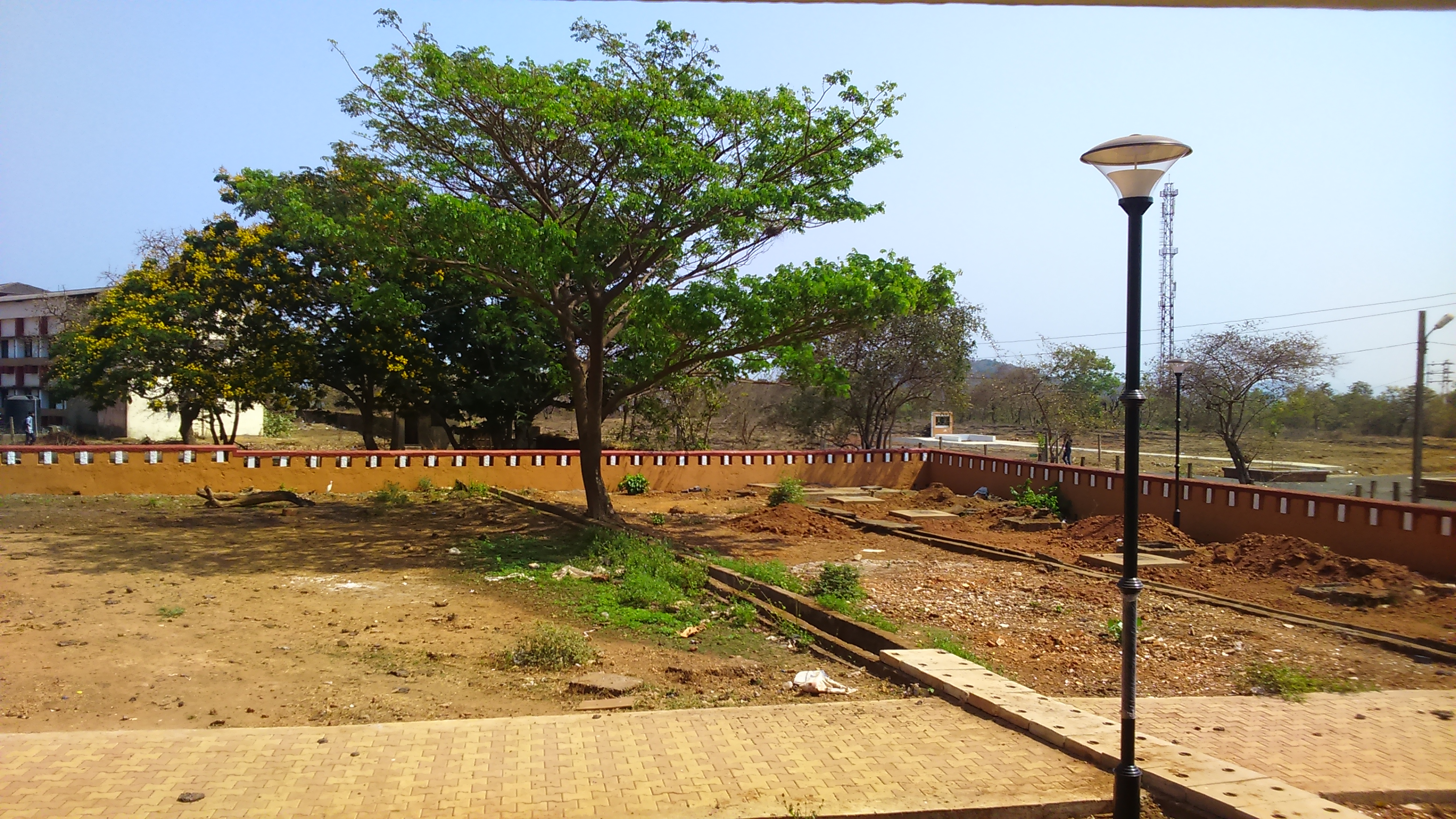
Hostel 1 backyard

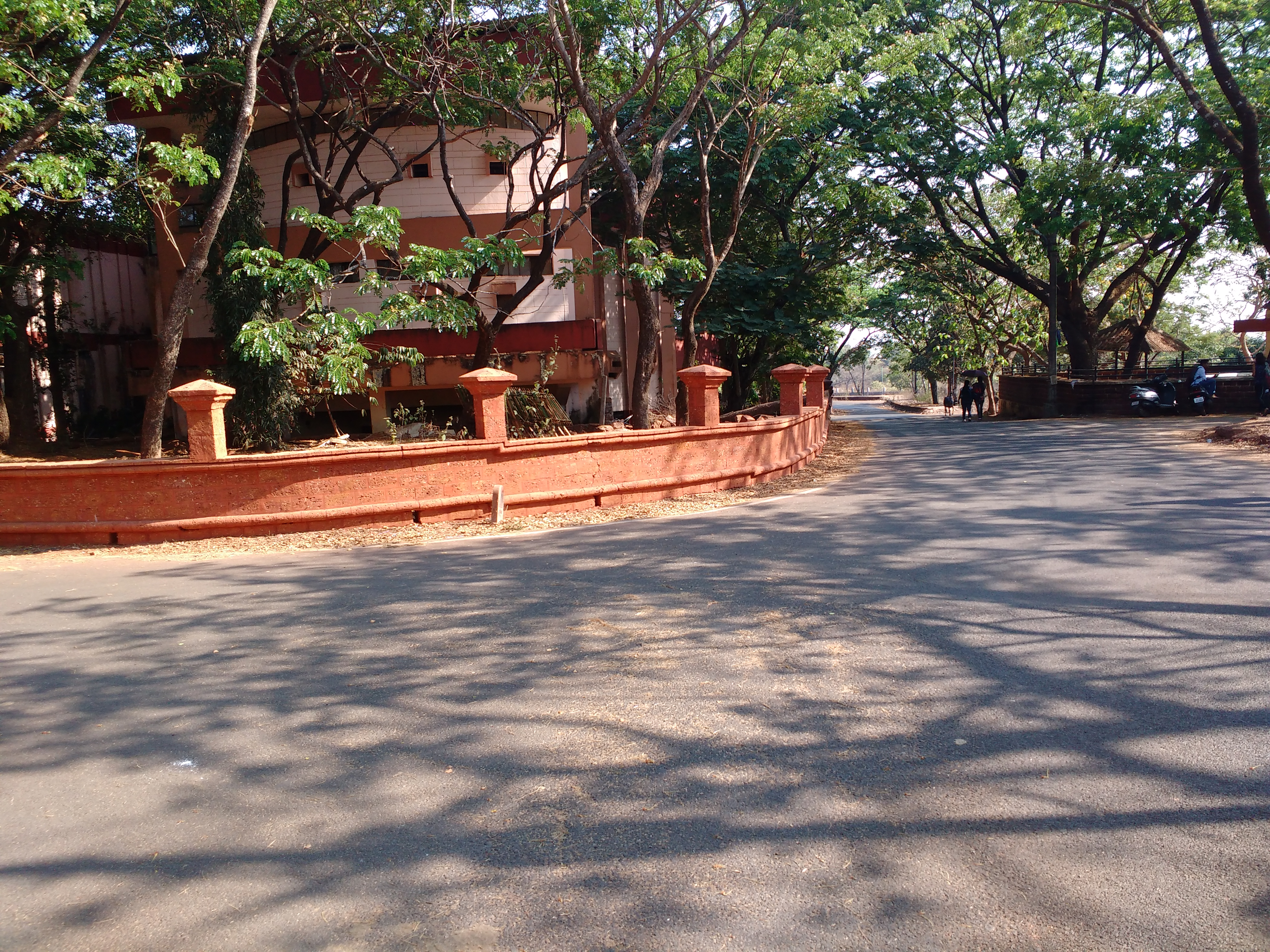
Near Canteen

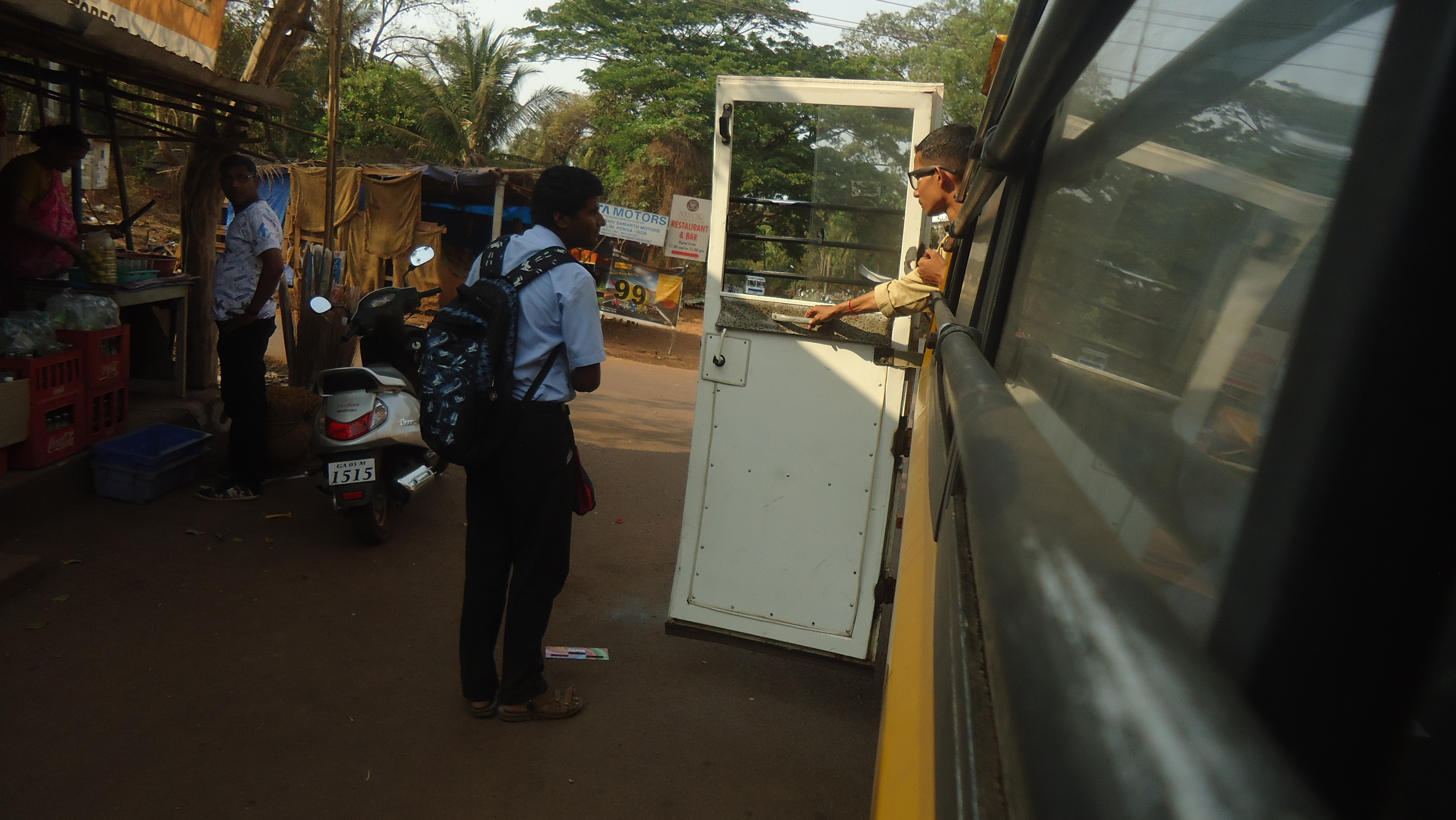
Students catching a Bal Rath (bus)

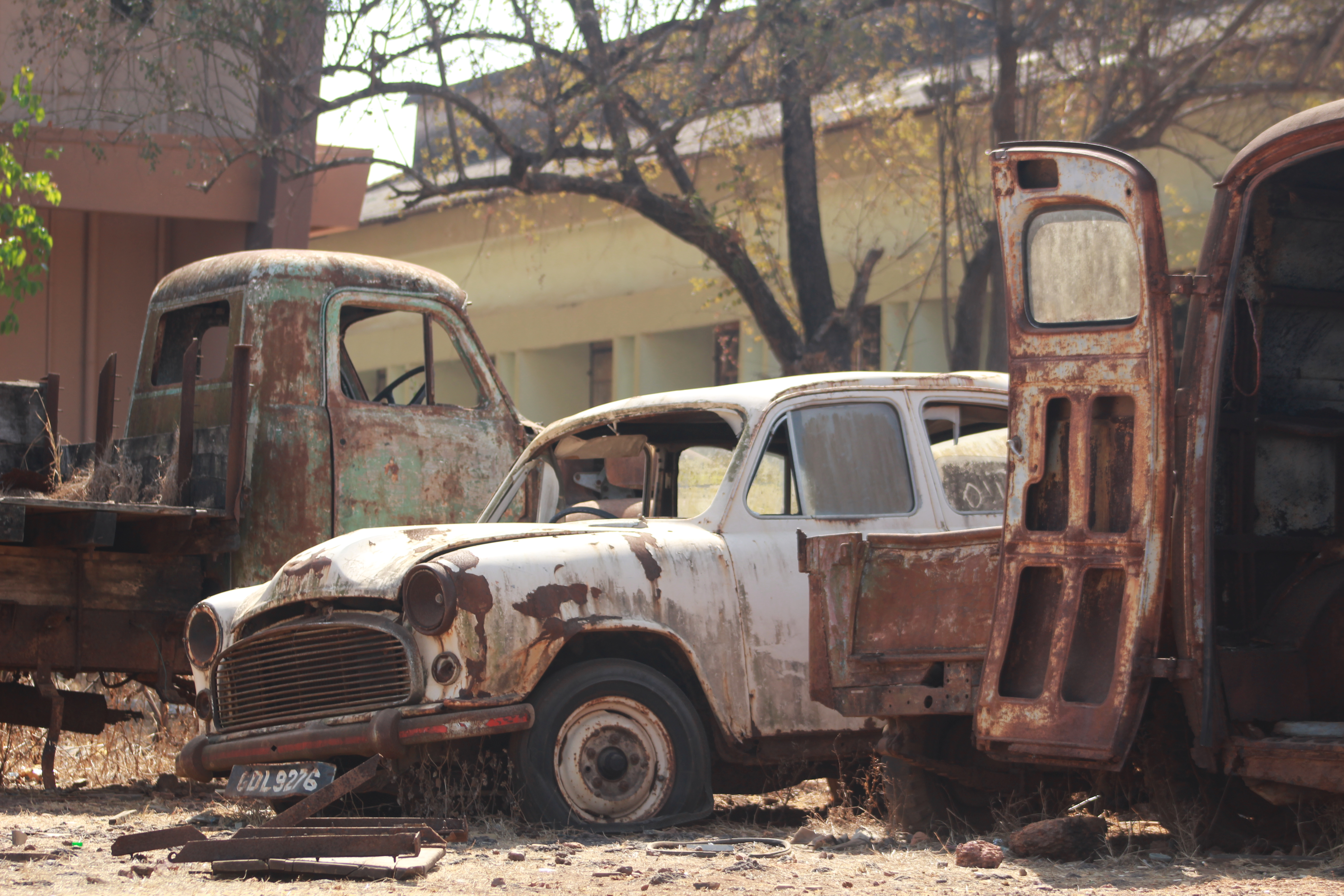
Abandoned cars rusting away

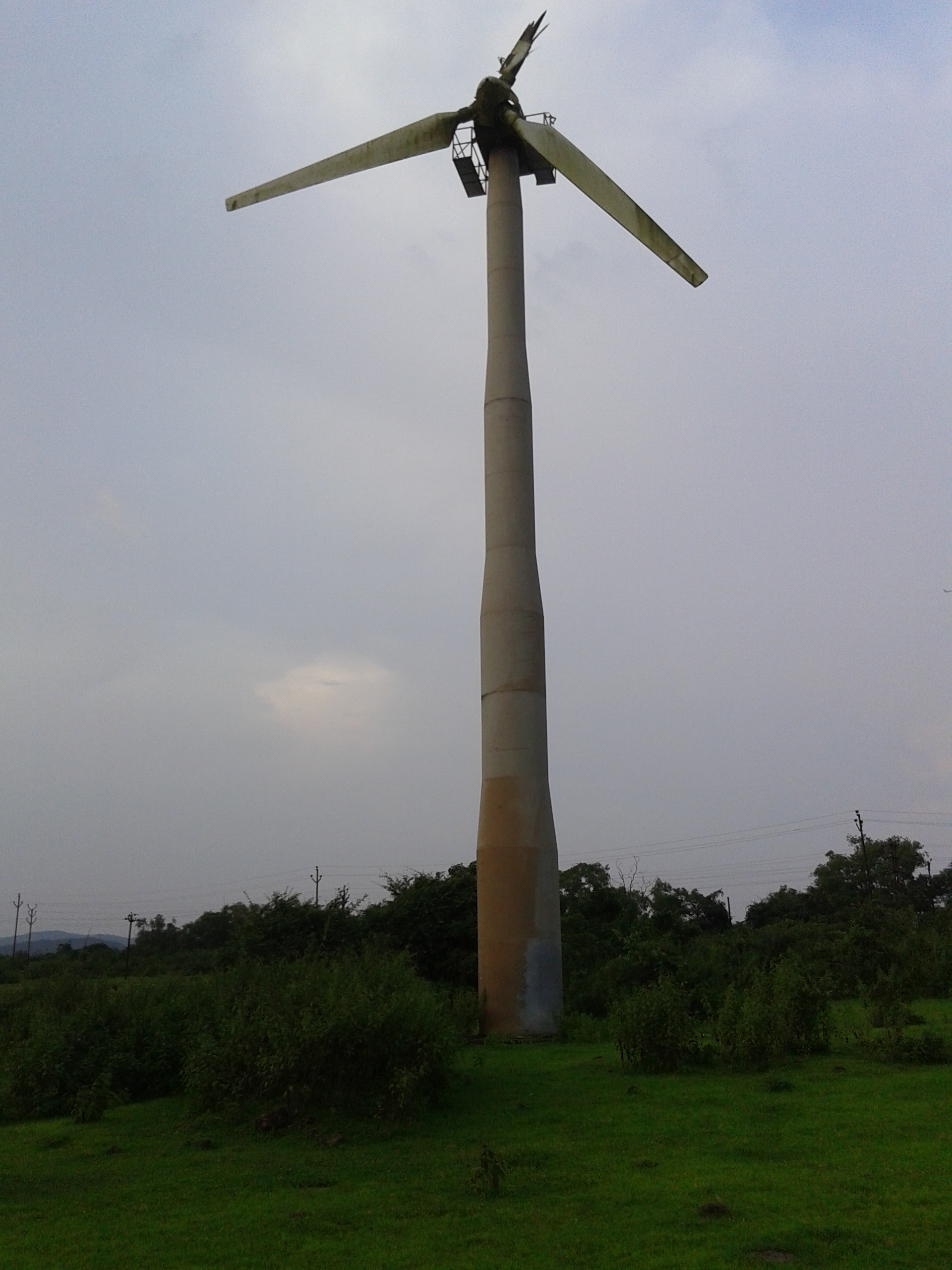
Windmill on campus

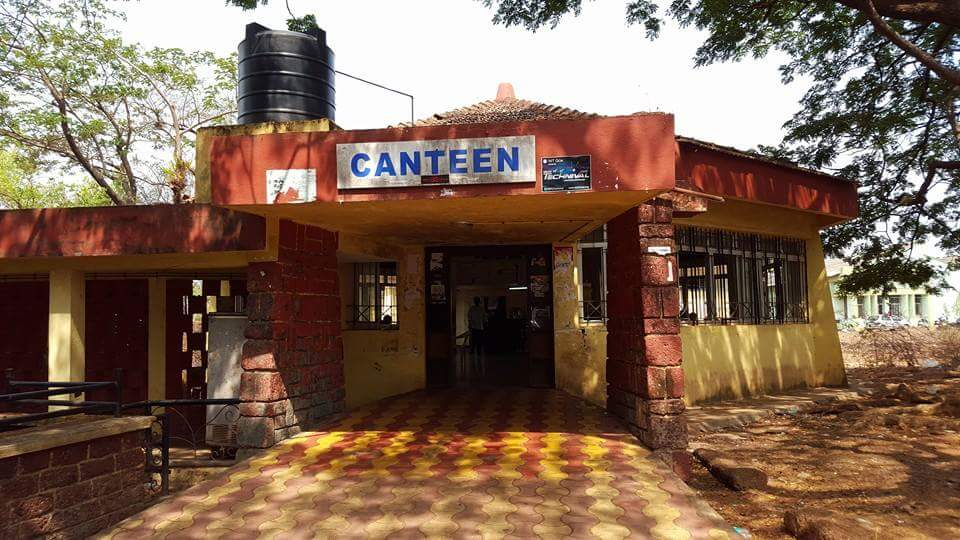
Canteen

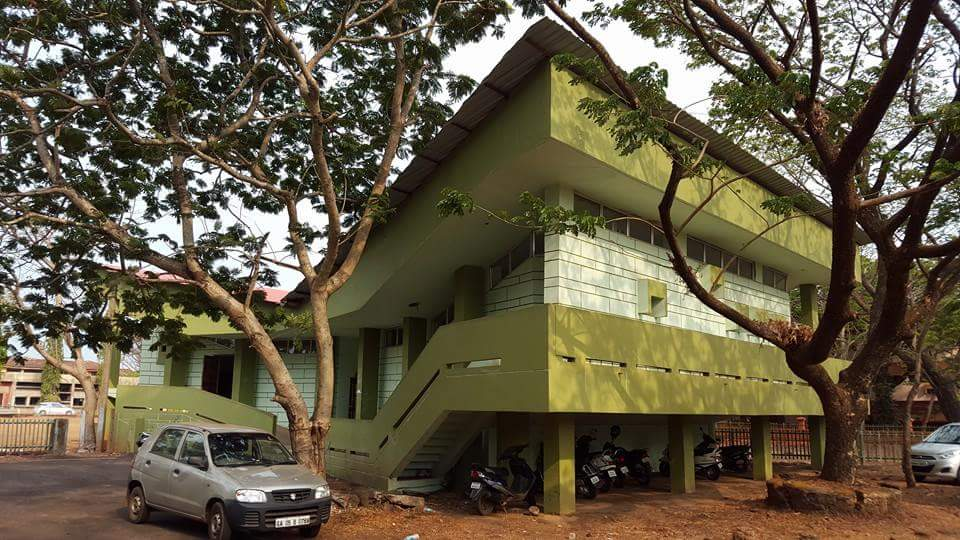
Theatre-style Lecture Halls

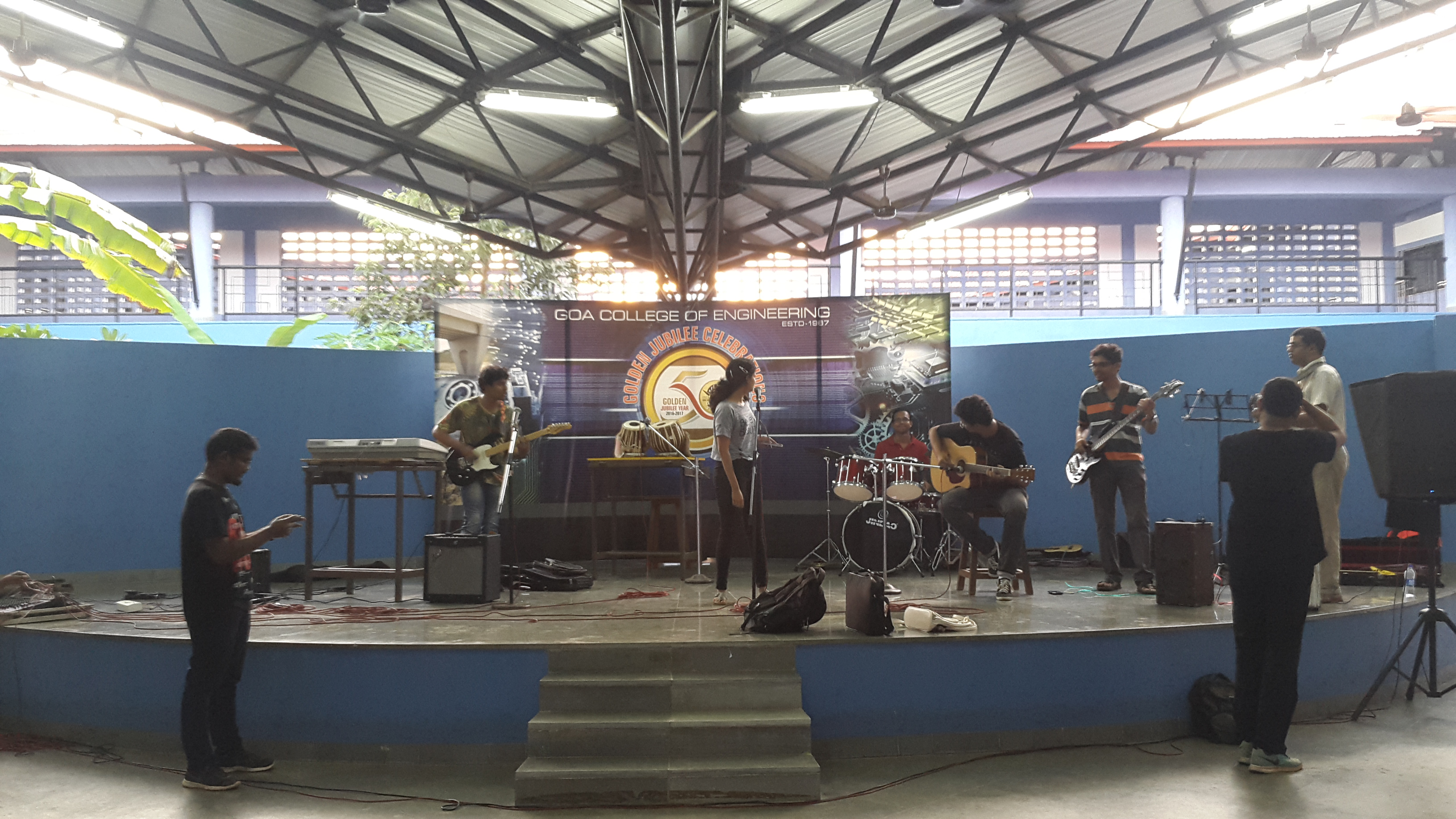
Music performance on campus

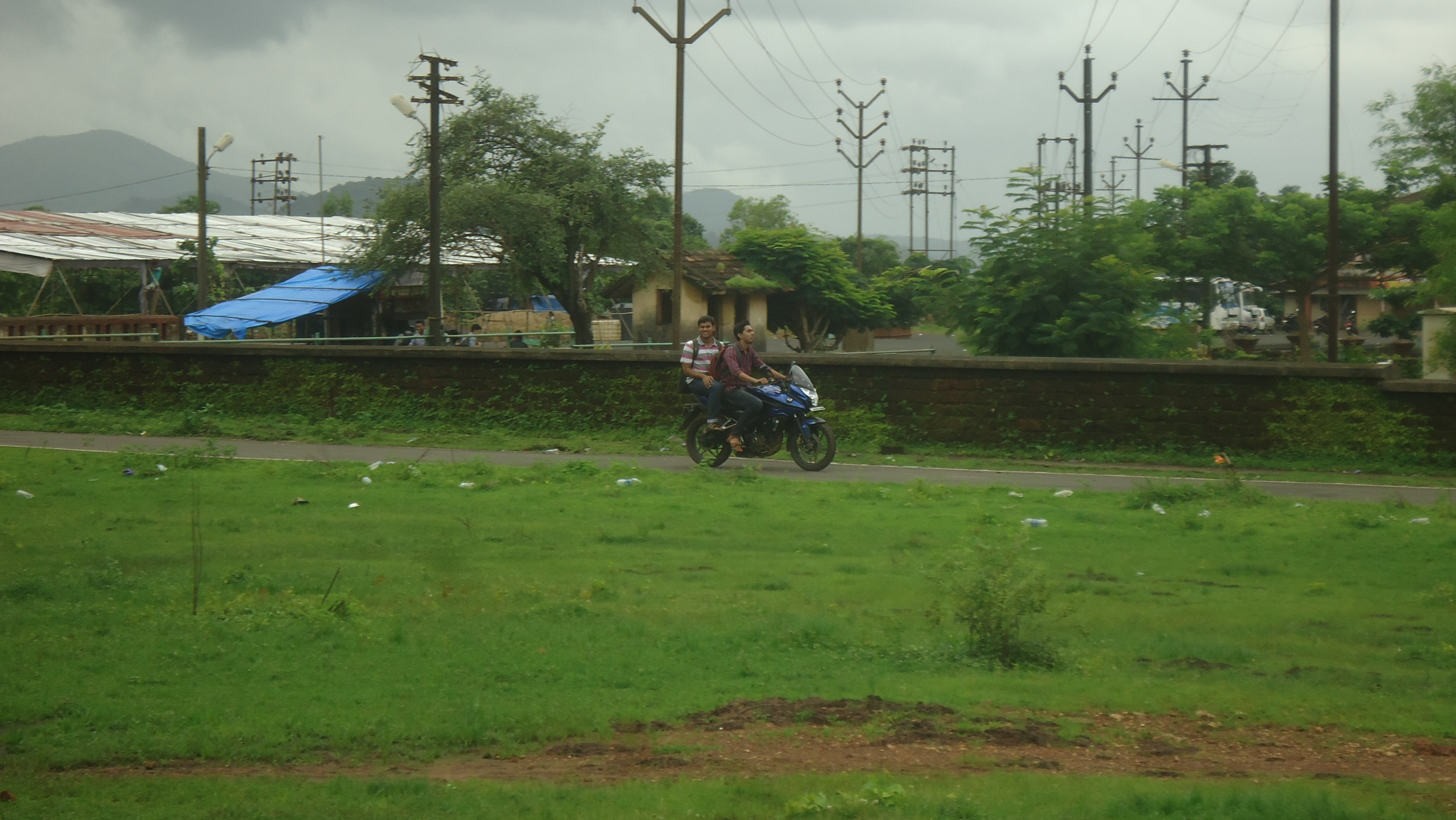
Campus during the Monsoons

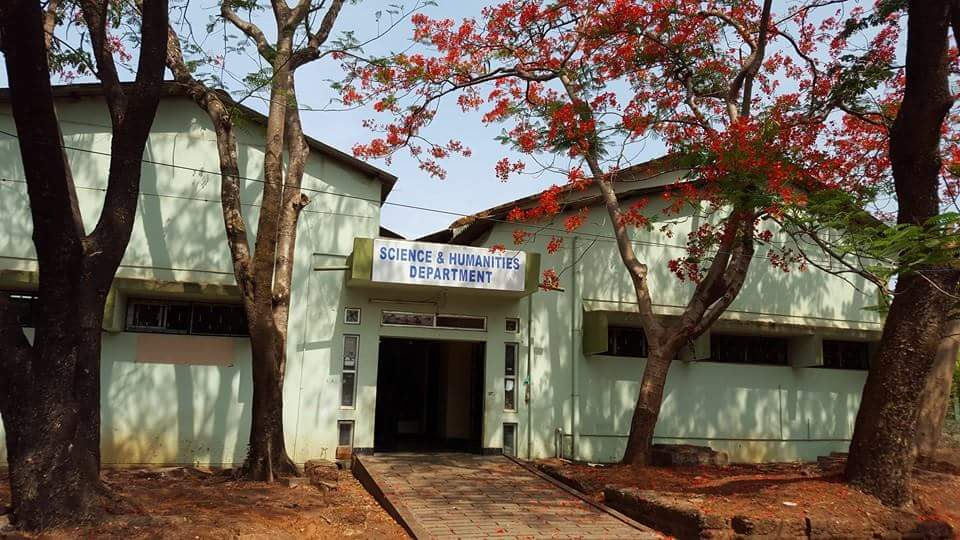
Science & Humanities Department

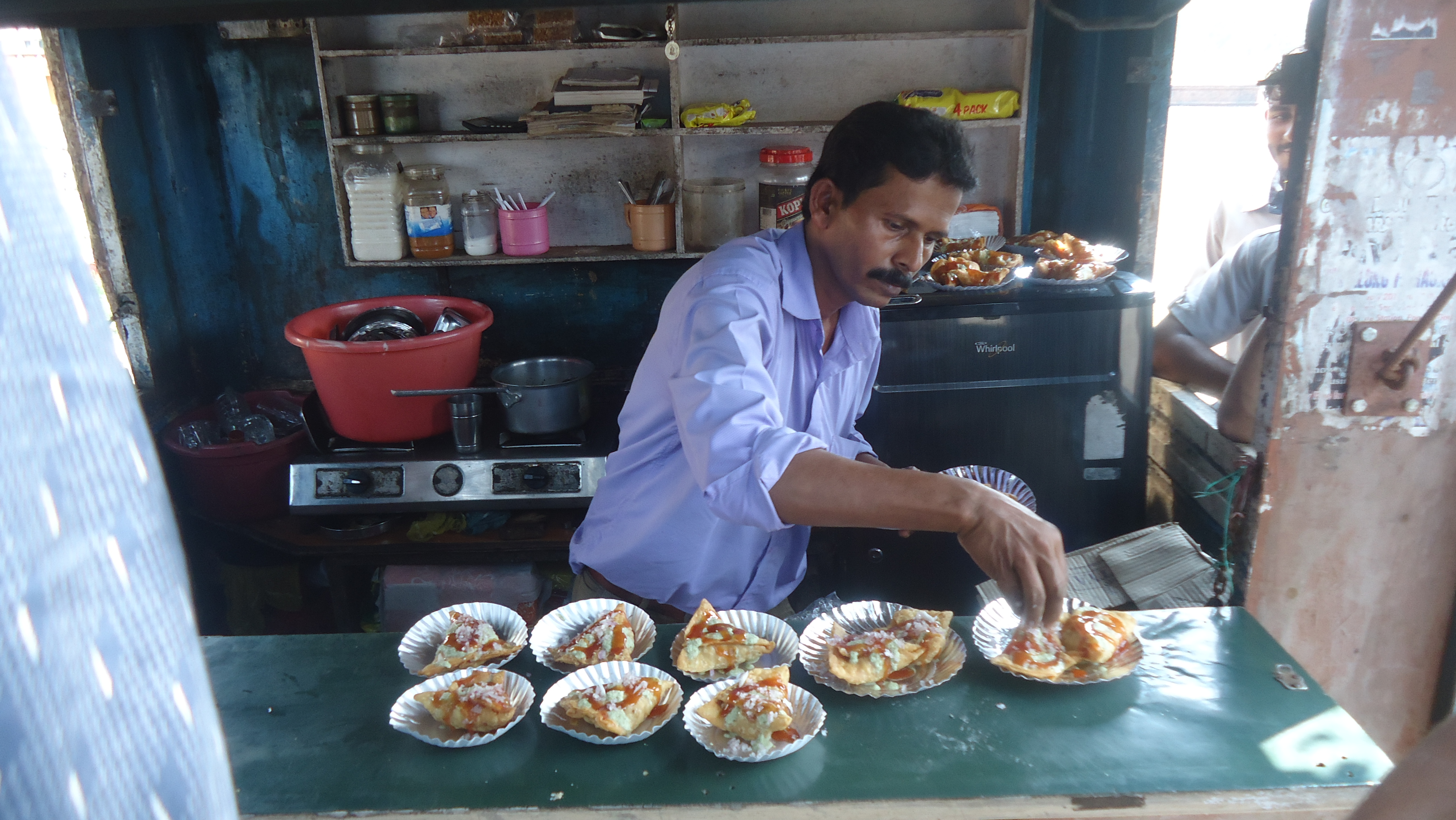
Umesh's gaddo
