= Panaji Assembly constituency =

Legislative Assembly constituency in Goa State, India

Coordinates: 15.50°N 73.83°E

Panaji
- Constituency No. 11 for the Goa Legislative Assembly

Constituency details
- Country: India
- Region: Western India
- State: Goa
- District: North Goa
- Lok Sabha constituency: North Goa
- Established: 1963
- Total electors: 22,408
- Reservation: None

Member of Legislative Assembly
- 8th Goa Legislative Assembly
- Incumbent Atanasio Monserrate
- Party: Bharatiya Janata Party

Panaji Assembly constituency is one of the 40 Legislative Assembly constituencies of Goa state in India.

It is part of North Goa district.

== Members of Legislative Assembly ==
Year	Member	Party
1963	Jack Sequeira	United Goans Party
1967	Yaswant Desai	United Goans Party
1972	Baban Naik	Maharashtrawadi Gomantak Party
1977	Madhav Bir	Janata Party
1980	Vishnu Naik	Independent
1984	Joan Gonsalves	Indian National Congress
1989	Joan Gonsalves	Indian National Congress
1994	Manohar Parrikar	Bharatiya Janata Party
1999	Manohar Parrikar	Bharatiya Janata Party
2002	Manohar Parrikar	Bharatiya Janata Party
2007	Manohar Parrikar	Bharatiya Janata Party
2012	Manohar Parrikar	Bharatiya Janata Party
2015^	Sidharth Kuncalienker	Bharatiya Janata Party
2017	Sidharth Kuncalienker	Bharatiya Janata Party
2017^	Manohar Parrikar	Bharatiya Janata Party
2019^	Atanasio Monserrate	Indian National Congress
2022	Atanasio Monserrate	Bharatiya Janata Party

^by-election

== Election results ==
=== 2027 Assembly election ===
2027 Goa Legislative Assembly election: Panaji
Party	Candidate	Votes	%	±%
INC				
NDA				
NOTA	None of the above			
Majority				
Turnout				
gain from		Swing		

=== Assembly Election 2022 ===
2022 Goa Legislative Assembly election : Panaji
Party	Candidate	Votes	%	±%
BJP	Atanasio Monserrate	6,787	38.88%	▼2.94
Independent	Utpal Manohar Parrikar	6,071	34.77%	New
INC	Elvis Gomes	3,175	18.19%	▼34.15
AAP	Valmiki Datta Naik	777	4.45%	▲1.84
RGP	Rajesh Vinayak Redkar	359	2.06%	New
NOTA	None of the Above	173	0.99%	▼0.22
Margin of victory		716	4.10%	▼6.42
Turnout		17,458	76.96%	▲3.56
Registered electors		22,408		▼0.33
BJP gain from INC		Swing	▼13.46	

=== Assembly By-election 2019 ===
A by-election was held on 19 May 2019, as a result of the demise of incumbent MLA and chief minister Manohar Parrikar.

2019 Goa Legislative Assembly by-election : Panaji
Party	Candidate	Votes	%	±%
INC	Atanasio Monserrate	8,748	52.33%	▲19.77
BJP	Sidharth Kuncalienker	6,990	41.82%	▼21.65
GSM	Subhash Bhaskar Velingkar	516	3.09%	▲1.67
AAP	Valmiki Naik	436	2.61%	New
NOTA	None of the above	202	1.21%	▼0.73
Margin of victory		1,758	10.52%	▼20.39
Turnout		16,716	74.35%	▲4.35
Registered electors		22,482		▲1.29
INC gain from BJP		Swing	▼11.14	

=== Assembly By-election 2017 ===
2017 GoaLegislative Assembly by-election : Panaji
Party	Candidate	Votes	%	±%
BJP	Manohar Parrikar	9,862	63.47%	▲17.77
INC	Girish Chodankar	5,059	32.56%	New
NOTA	None of the above	301	1.94%	New
GSM	Anand Shirodkar	220	1.42%	▼0.45
Independent	Kenneth Silveira	96	0.62%	New
Margin of victory		4,803	30.91%	▲24.75
Turnout		15,538	69.05%	▼8.09
Registered electors		22,196		▼0.03
BJP hold		Swing	▲17.77	

=== Assembly Election 2017 ===
2017 Goa Legislative Assembly election : Panaji
Party	Candidate	Votes	%	±%
BJP	Sidharth Kuncalienker	7,924	45.70%	▼19.27
UGP	Atanasio Monserrate	6,855	39.54%	New
AAP	Valmiki Naik	1,944	11.21%	New
GSM	Ketan Kirtikumar Prabhu Bhatikar	323	1.86%	New
NOTA	None of the Above	175	1.01%	New
Margin of victory		1,069	6.17%	▼28.75
Turnout		17,339	78.09%	▲8.39
Registered electors		22,203		▲0.66
BJP hold		Swing	▼19.27	

=== Assembly By-election 2015 ===
2015 Goa Legislative Assembly by-election : Panaji
Party	Candidate	Votes	%	±%
BJP	Sidharth Kuncalienker	9,989	64.97%	▼0.86
INC	Surendra Furtado	4,621	30.06%	▲0.26
Independent	Samir Gurunath Kelekar	624	4.06%	New
NOTA	None of the above	330	2.15%	New
Independent	Sadanand Vaigankar	140	0.91%	New
Margin of victory		5,368	34.92%	▼1.12
Turnout		15,374	69.70%	▼9.15
Registered electors		22,057		▲3.29
BJP hold		Swing	▼0.86	

=== Assembly Election 2012 ===
2012 Goa Legislative Assembly election : Panaji
Party	Candidate	Votes	%	±%
BJP	Manohar Parrikar	11,086	65.84%	▲9.10
INC	Yatin Parekh	5,018	29.80%	New
CPI	Christopher Fonseca	383	2.27%	New
JD(U)	Dominic Savio A. E. Fernandes	172	1.02%	New
Independent	Balaram Karishetty	104	0.62%	New
Margin of victory		6,068	36.04%	▲22.39
Turnout		16,839	78.50%	▲8.01
Registered electors		21,355		▲42.97
BJP hold		Swing	▲9.10	

=== Assembly Election 2007 ===
2007 Goa Legislative Assembly election : Panaji
Party	Candidate	Votes	%	±%
BJP	Manohar Parrikar	6,004	56.74%	▲1.26
INC	Dinar Purshottam Kamat Tarcar	4,560	43.09%	New
Margin of victory		1,444	13.65%	▲1.07
Turnout		10,582	70.72%	▲4.90
Registered electors		14,937		▼4.13
BJP hold		Swing		

=== Assembly Election 2002 ===
2002 Goa Legislative Assembly election : Panaji
Party	Candidate	Votes	%	±%
BJP	Manohar Parrikar	5,700	55.48%	▲3.98
INC	Silimkhan Ramesh	4,408	42.90%	New
SS	Naik Pramod Gopinath	95	0.92%	New
Margin of victory		1,292	12.58%	▼13.66
Turnout		10,274	65.82%	▲9.63
Registered electors		15,581		▼16.27
BJP hold		Swing		

=== Assembly Election 1999 ===
1999 Goa Legislative Assembly election : Panaji
Party	Candidate	Votes	%	±%
BJP	Manohar Parrikar	5,396	51.50%	▲7.88
INC	Prabhu Keshav Laximidhar	2,647	25.26%	New
Goa Rajiv Congress Party	Furtado Surendra Cristovan	1,315	12.55%	New
Independent	Gonsalves Joao Baptista Floriano	573	5.58%	New
MGP	Nunes Vero Luis Joao	350	3.41%	New
UGDP	Deshprabhu Mohan Anandrao	147	1.43%	New
Margin of victory		2,749	26.24%	▲16.13
Turnout		10,478	56.27%	▼6.17
Registered electors		18,609		▲10.24
BJP hold		Swing	▲7.88	

=== Assembly Election 1994 ===
1994 Goa Legislative Assembly election : Panaji
Party	Candidate	Votes	%	±%
BJP	Manohar Parrikar	4,600	43.61%	New
INC	Prabhu Keshav Laximidhar	3,534	33.51%	
Independent	Furtado Surendra Cristovan	1,139	10.80%	New
Gomantak Lok Pox	Sequeira Erasmo Jack	736	6.98%	New
Independent	Vaigonkar Damodar Vinayak	110	1.04%	New
UGDP	Tamba Raghura-I	85	0.81%	New
Margin of victory		1,066	10.11%	▼0.30
Turnout		10,547	61.34%	▼3.15
Registered electors		16,881		▲7.98
BJP gain from INC		Swing	▲4.79	

=== Assembly Election 1989 ===
1989 Goa Legislative Assembly election : Panaji
Party	Candidate	Votes	%	±%
INC	Joan Gonsalves	3,983	38.82%	▼6.04
MGP	Pushpashil Krishna Kerkar	2,915	28.41%	New
Gomantak Lok Pox	Erasmo De Sequeira	2,672	26.04%	New
BJP	Madhav Manohat Dhond	269	2.62%	New
JD	Madhav Ramkrishna Bir	143	1.39%	New
Independent	Xavier Chrishtanou Furtade	61	0.59%	New
Independent	Arvind Y. Karapukar	8	0.08%	New
Margin of victory		1,068	10.41%	▼17.16
Turnout		10,260	64.29%	▲0.02
Registered electors		15,633		▼5.01
INC hold		Swing	▼6.04	

=== Assembly Election 1984 ===
1984 Goa, Daman and Diu Legislative Assembly election : Panaji
Party	Candidate	Votes	%	±%
INC	Joan Gonsalves	4,844	44.86%	New
MGP	Baban Naik	1,867	17.29%	New
Independent	Mandrekar Ramkrishna Narsinv	1,462	13.54%	New
Independent	Shenvi Silimkhan Prabhakar Ramnath	1,021	9.46%	New
Independent	Vishnu Naik	487	4.51%	New
Independent	Madhav R. Bir	373	3.45%	New
BJP	Sarmalkar Jayprakash Gajanan	254	2.35%	New
Margin of victory		2,977	27.57%	▲20.15
Turnout		10,798	64.20%	▼1.97
Registered electors		16,457		▼0.45
INC gain from Independent		Swing	▲9.35	

=== Assembly Election 1980 ===
1980 Goa, Daman and Diu Legislative Assembly election : Panaji
Party	Candidate	Votes	%	±%
Independent	Vishnu Naik	3,967	35.51%	New
MGP	Baban Naik	3,138	28.09%	New
JP	Madhav R. Bir	2,449	21.92%	
INC(I)	Priolkar Prafull Vaikunt	1,005	8.99%	New
JP(S)	Dessai Yeshwant Sitaram	291	2.60%	New
Margin of victory		829	7.42%	▼4.08
Turnout		11,173	65.63%	▲11.74
Registered electors		16,531		▲5.52
Independent gain from JP		Swing	▼5.13	

=== Assembly Election 1977 ===
1977 Goa, Daman and Diu Legislative Assembly election : Panaji
Party	Candidate	Votes	%	±%
JP	Madhav R. Bir	3,555	40.63%	New
MGP	Sardessai Kashinath Venkatesh	2,549	29.13%	
INC	Ataide Lobo Jorge De Graca Antonio	1,981	22.64%	New
Independent	Silimkhan Ramesh Raguvir	416	4.75%	New
Independent	Sarmalkar Mohamlal Sadashiv	106	1.21%	New
Independent	Naik Balchandra Ganesh	47	0.54%	New
Independent	Fernandes Melicio Andre Aleixo	27	0.31%	New
Margin of victory		1,006	11.50%	▲9.11
Turnout		8,749	55.41%	▼12.68
Registered electors		15,666		▲13.73
JP gain from MGP		Swing	▼1.56	

=== Assembly Election 1972 ===
1972 Goa, Daman and Diu Legislative Assembly election : Panaji
Party	Candidate	Votes	%	±%
MGP	Baban Naik	3,983	42.20%	New
UGP	Desai Yeshwant Sitaram	3,758	39.81%	
INC	S. E. H. Aleixo	1,580	16.74%	New
Margin of victory		225	2.38%	▲2.38
Turnout		9,439	67.67%	▲67.85
Registered electors		13,775		▲2.08
MGP gain from UGP		Swing	▲41.78	

=== Assembly Election 1967 ===
1967 Goa, Daman and Diu Legislative Assembly election : Panaji
Party	Candidate	Votes	%	±%
UGP	Y. S. Desai	3,846	41.39%	
MGP	T. M. Upendra	3,776		
Independent	M. P. Jagannath	1,051		
Independent	K. S. Ranu	138		
Independent	P. C. Hari	96		
Independent	L. V. Narayan	73		
Independent	Nathurmal	38		
Margin of victory		70	0.75%	
Margin of victory		2,725		
MGP win (new seat)				

== See also ==
- List of constituencies of the Goa Legislative Assembly
- North Goa district
