= Loyola High School (Goa) =

Location
- Municipal Garden, Margao, Comba, Goa; India; 15°16′26″N 73°57′21″E

Information
- Former names: Union High School (1899–1932); St Theotonius Union High School (1932–1944)
- Type: Private primary and secondary school; Christian minority school
- Motto: Latin: Corde Magno et Animo Volenti (With a large heart & willing spirit)
- Religious affiliation: Catholicism
- Denomination: Jesuits
- Patron saint: Ignatius of Loyola
- Established: 13 July 1899; 127 years ago
- Founder: Roque Santana Gracias
- Principal: Fr. Anand D'souza, S.J
- Faculty: 63
- Gender: Boys
- Enrollment: 1500
- Sports: Football; Basketball; Volleyball; Handball; Table Tennis; Cricket
- Nickname: Loyolites
- Affiliation: Goa Board of Secondary and Higher Secondary Education
- Website: www.loyolahssgoa.com

Loyola High School is a private Catholic primary and secondary school for boys, located in the heart of Margao in the South Goa district of Goa, India. Founded in 1899 as the Union High School, the Christian minority school is managed by the Jesuits. Affiliated with the Goa Board of Secondary and Higher Secondary Education, the school's students take the Secondary School Certificate examinations.

== Staff and enrolment ==
Loyola High School has approximately 1500 students, 75 teachers, and 20 support staff. Classes run from 1st to 4th standards (primary), 5th to 10th standards (secondary) and 11th to 12th standard (higher secondary). All classes have four sections (A, B, C, D), not based on performance.

Admission to the school is competitive. The Loyolite uniform is a sky blue shirt and navy blue pants, with an "L" on the left shirt pocket.

== Culture ==
Three times a week an assembly is held in the open quadrangle, organized by students of each class. The student-chosen topics for these assemblies range from the importance of moral values, to current affairs, to scientific discoveries. On the first Friday of each month there is a Eucharistic liturgy (Mass) held in the school hall for the entire school community.

== Building architecture and facilities ==
The building has three floors above the quadrangle, with the section below devoted to the primary section. Each standard has four divisions, located adjacent to each other. There is a large hall, a staff room, a gymnasium, three laboratories, and the largest school library in Goa – all surrounding the quadrangle, overlooked by the statue of St. Ignatius of Loyola, the school's patron saint.

The basketball court hosts inter-school, taluka-level, zonal level, and statewide games. The soccer field is situated outside the main campus, and is known as the Loyola Grounds. The old Loyola Ground is being renovated and a football (soccer) stadium built.

The main school building was formerly L-shaped, with the longer arm containing the main school and the shorter arm containing the boarding and resident priests' quarters on the upper floors, the Chapel of St. Ignatius and the administrative offices on the upper ground floor with a bridge leading to the quadrangle, and the primary section on the lower ground floor.

The new school building is G-shaped, with the new sections housing a hall, library, staff room, gymnasium, laboratories, toilet complex, computer room, and classrooms. In 1993, Loyola High School became the first public school in southwest India to replace black boards with green-boards.

The quadrangle, which is used for morning student and staff assemblies, flag hoisting, student concerts, and school fetes, is surrounded by colourful flowering creepers growing on the walls of the school building. The quadrangle is home for South Goa's best-attended English services for Maundy Thursday, Good Friday, Easter, Christmas, and New Years, when scores of people participate accompanied by school choirs.

In 2016 the school "won a national-level ‘White Swan Award’ hosted by AsiaOne Magazine as being the ‘Most Influential Brand’ in the education category in India."

== History ==
Loyola was founded as Union High School in Salcette, Goa, on 13 July 1899, by the late Roque Santana Gracias. The Archdiocese of Goa took it over in 1932 and renamed it St Theotonius Union High School. In 1944 Goa Jesuits took charge and renamed it Loyola High School after their founder, St. Ignatius of Loyola.

LESA (Loyola Ex-Students' Association) is the alumni association of the school. There is also a forum for parents to voice their opinions on the running of the school, called the PTA (Parent Teacher Association). The forerunner to LESA was LOBA (Loyola Old Boys Association). Loyola being an all-boy school, traditionally Loyola teachers refer to students as "boys" and ex-students as "old boys".

The school has experienced success on the football field on a regular basis. It has also represented Goa at the Bournvita quiz contest. The singing group has also placed well in competition.

== Notable alumni ==
- Manohar Parrikar

== See also ==
- List of Jesuit schools
- List of schools in Goa
- Violence against Christians in India
