= Sidharth Kuncalienker =

Indian politician

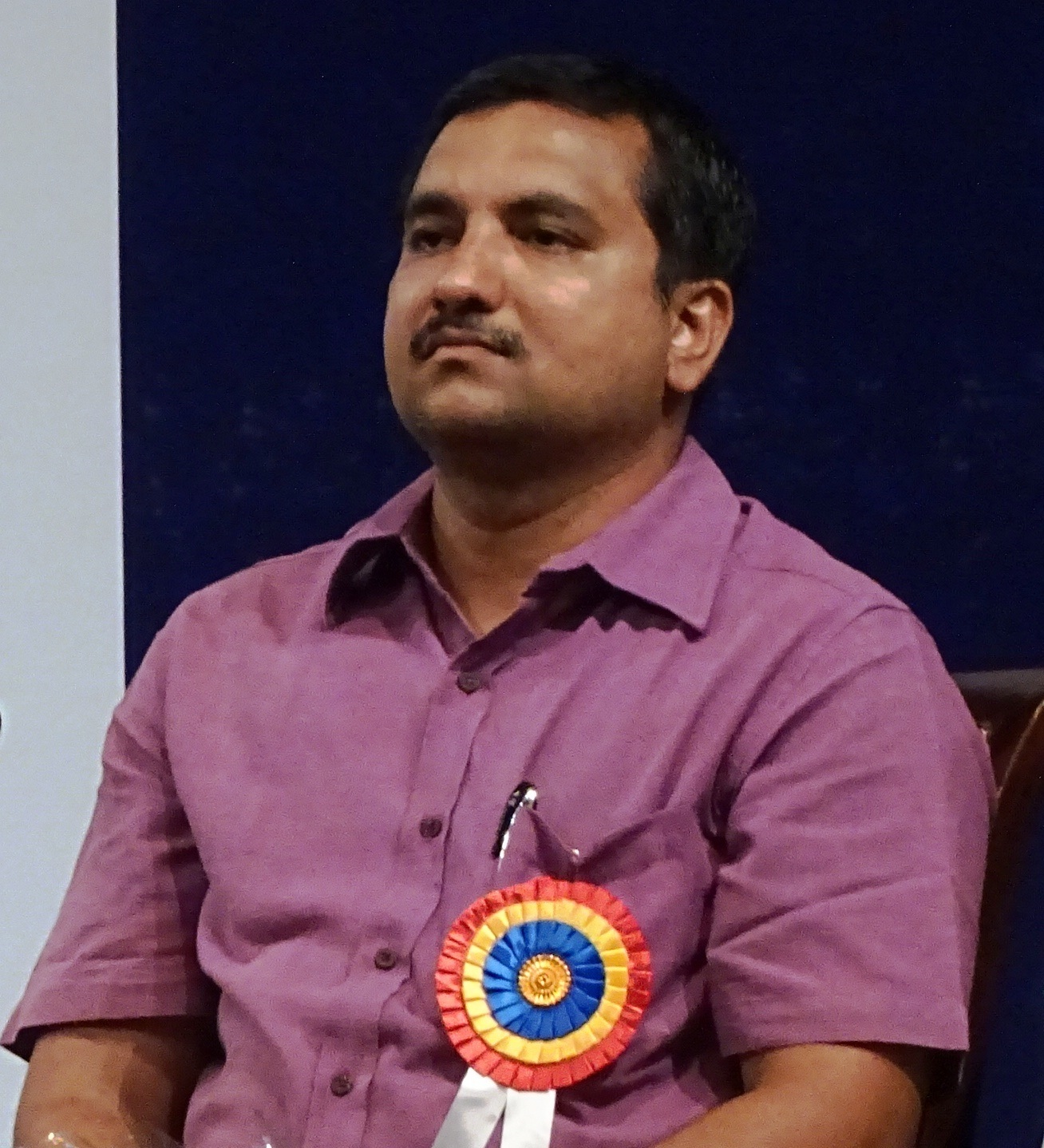
- Kuncalienker in 2015

Member of the Goa Legislative Assembly
- In office 23 February 2015 – 10 May 2017
- Preceded by: Manohar Parrikar
- Succeeded by: Manohar Parrikar
- Constituency: Panaji

Personal details
- Born: Boca-De-Vaca, Panaji
- Party: Bharatiya Janata Party
- Education: Goa Engineering College
- Occupation: Politician
- Website: sidharth4panaji.net

Sidharth Sripad Kuncalienker is an Indian politician who is a former member of the Goa Legislative Assembly. He had been elected in a by poll from Panaji constituency in place of Manohar Parrikar. He is a member of the Bharatiya Janata Party (BJP). On 10 May 2017, Kuncalienker resigned in order to allow Goa Chief Minister Manohar Parrikar to contest the seat.

== Posts ==
He was the chairman of the Economic Development Corporation limited.
