= Mitra Bir =

Indian independence activist and educationist

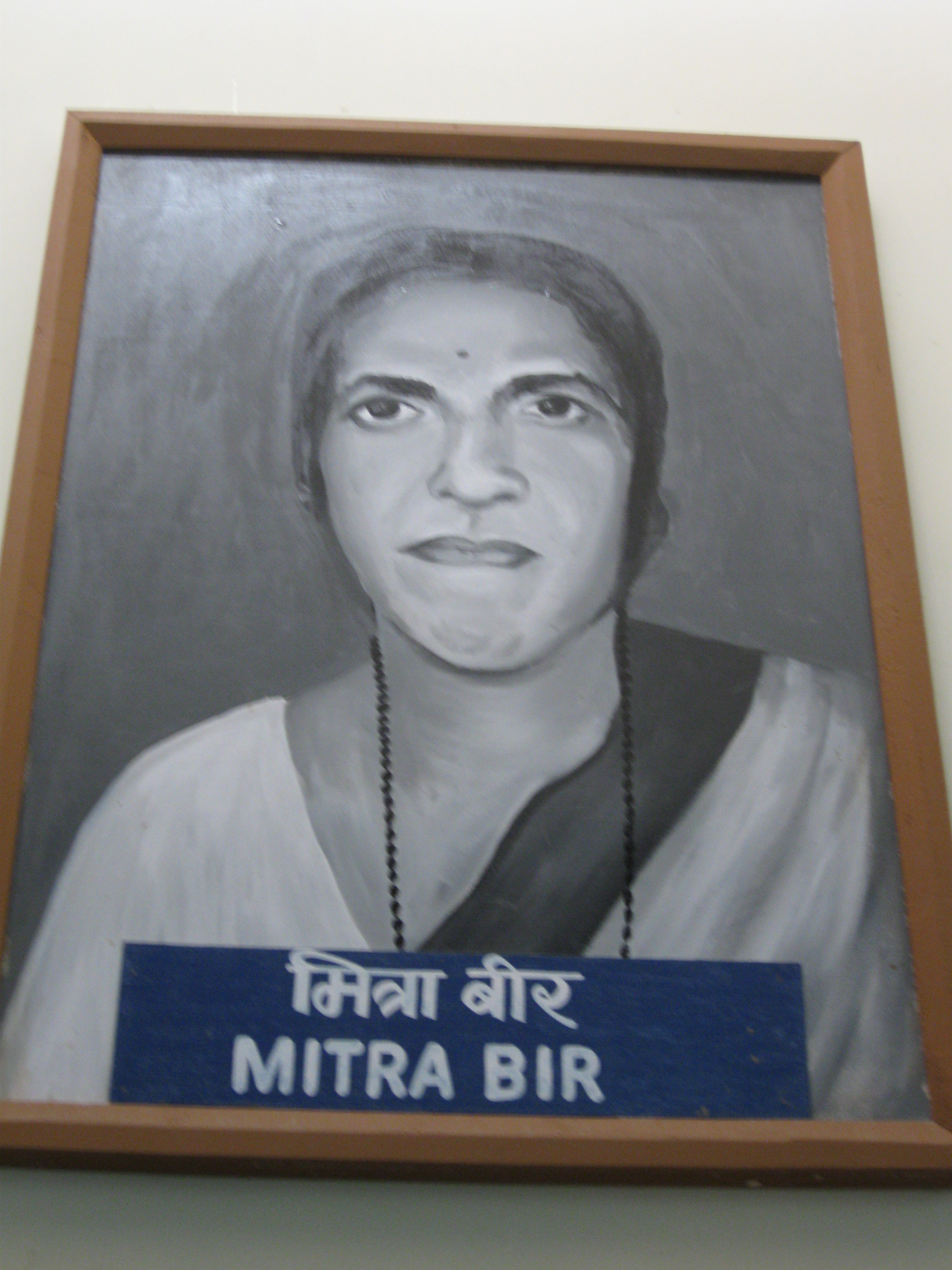
- A portrait of Bir as seen in Goa State Museum
- Born: Mitravrinda Vasant Sinai Kakodkar; 30 December 1932; Kakoda, Quepem, Portuguese Goa
- Died: 1 June 1978 (aged 45)
- Occupations: Social worker, politician
- Movement: Goan independence movement
- Spouse: Madhav R. Bir
- Relatives: Amita Kanekar (niece)

Mitra Madhav Bir (30 December 1932 – 1 June 1978) was a freedom fighter and social worker from Goa. She actively participated in the Goan independence movement, enduring imprisonment for her activism, and subsequently dedicated her life to the fields of education and social welfare.

== Early and personal life ==
Mitravrinda Vasant Sinai Kakodkar was born on 30 December 1932 in Kakoda, located in the Quepem taluka. She pursued higher studies, successfully earning both Master of Arts (M.A.) and Bachelor of Education (B.Ed.) degrees. She finished her final school certification in 1949 and then joined Karnatak College, Dharwad.

She was married to Madhav Ramkrishna Bir. She is also the aunt of Amita Kanekar.

== Goan independence movement ==
While she was studying at the Karnatak College, then Prime Minister of India Jawaharlal Nehru visited the college. This inspired her to begin her activism for Goa's independence and she dropped out of her studies.

She worked closely with the residents of Siolim in the Bardez taluka to foster political awareness. During this time, she connected with Pundalik Gaitonde and other prominent independence activists who, under the leadership of the National Congress (Goa), were organizing satyagraha demonstrations and mobilizing women and young girls to join the struggle.

Gaitonde personally recruited her to teach English to his wife, Edila. She then quit her job teaching in a school in Mapusa and began living in a village on the Goa border, mobilizing people from there.

On 28 March 1955, Bir was arrested in Mapusa while organizing a group of female volunteers to welcome Sudhatai Joshi, who was arriving to preside over a meeting of the National Congress. She was 22 years old at the time. Following her arrest, she was sentenced to twelve years in prison. She spent two years in the lockup in Panaji city. Since the prison was not meant for women, she was shifted to a prison in Margao. There, she shared a room with seven other women, to whom she taught English and Hindi. She was released in 1959 when the Portuguese released all non-violent prisoners on amnesty.

After serving her sentence, Bir toured extensively across Goa. Recognizing the power of literacy in the nationalist struggle, she collaborated with local villagers to establish Marathi-medium schools in numerous villages, effectively using education as a vehicle to advance the freedom movement.

== Post-independence and public career ==
Following the Indian annexation of Goa, Bir continued her efforts in teaching and social service with equal dedication. In 1962, she was elected as a member of the Verem-Betim panchayat. Over the course of her career, she served as a member of the Social Welfare Board and was appointed as the president of the Goa branch of the All India Women's Conference. She was also an active women's rights activist.

== Death ==
Bir died in an accident on 1 June 1978.

== Legacy ==
In her honour, her husband Madhav R. Bir established the 'Mitra Bir Pratishthan' (Mitra Bir Foundation). To commemorate her contributions to society, the foundation annually presents an award to a woman who has achieved outstanding distinction in the social sector of Goa.
