= Madhav R. Bir =

Indian politician (1923–unknown)

Madhav Ramkrishna Pai Bir

Member of Goa, Daman and Diu Legislative Assembly
- In office 1977–1980
- Constituency: Panaji constituency

Personal details
- Born: 15 August 1923 Belgaum
- Died: Unknown
- Party: Janata Party
- Spouse: Sara (Sarita) Souza

Madhav Ramkrishna Pai Bir (15 August 1923 – unknown) was an Indian independence activist and politician from Belgaum. He was active in the Quit India Movement and the 1946 movement in Belgaum, and later became an important part of the Goan independence movement. He also served as a member of the Legislative Assembly and was a leader of the Janata Party in Goa.

== Early life and independence movement ==
Madhav Ramkrishna Pai Bir was born on 15 August 1923 in Belgaum. His father was Ramkrishna Pundalik Pai Bir. He began his political activism by participating in the Quit India Movement and the subsequent 1946 movement within Belgaum.

Bir was elected as a member of the working committee during the foundational meeting of the National Congress Goa, which took place in Londa. On 25 November 1946, he was arrested in Mapusa after delivering public speeches in the villages of Chorao and Carambolim. Following a ten-day imprisonment, he was escorted to the Satarda border and released.

Upon returning to Goa, Bir traveled to the Bicholim taluka to educate the local population regarding Satyagraha and the objectives of the National Congress Goa. This activism resulted in another arrest and an eight-day imprisonment. He subsequently continued his support for the Goan Satyagraha movement through underground operations. From 1951 to 1953, he served as the General Secretary of the National Congress Goa. He was also a member of the Satyagrahi Advisory Committee and maintained connections with the underground Azad Gomantak Radio station.

== Post-independence and political career ==
In 1977, Bir was elected to the Legislative Assembly as a representative of the Panaji constituency.

He served as a leader for the Janata Party in Goa. Throughout his career, he worked toward the advancement of the cooperative movement and the development of small-scale industries in Goa.

Bir was married to Mitra Bir.

== Awards and accolades ==
Bir was awarded the Tamrapatra by the Government of India in recognition of his contributions to the freedom struggle. He was also honoured by the Government of Goa.
