= Enchanted Valley Carnival =

Enchanted Valley Festival (EVC) is India's largest music annual festival that brings different music genres from electronic and techno to pop and indie together. It is held in Aamby Valley City, India, for three days. EVC's first edition was in 2013.

== Characteristics ==
EVC is an Indian music festival that brings different music genres to the same platform. It is the first festival in Asia to be held on an airstrip, introduced to the Indian audiences in 2013. EVC's location is in Aamby Valley, Lonavala, between Pune and Mumbai, in India. The two day carnival also includes an after party line up with 2 stages and a special 'Silent Party.' The after party also has a lineup of artists like the main festival.

The festival has 5 different stages, each where a specific genre of music is played. It lines up more than 50 top artists in total. EVC takes place in December and hosts artists from India and abroad. The festival offers varied genres like pop, Bollywood, electronic dance music, techno, fusion and Indie, along with other experimental music.

EVC combines both music and professional adventure sports activities such as all-terrain vehicle riding, bungee jumping, zorbing, rock climbing, rappelling, 4x4 jungle safari, zipline, hot air ballooning and water sports such as speed boats/jet skis, kayaks, pirate ships, tribal boats, pontoon boats, floating volleyball and basketball.

== History ==
EVC is India's biggest music festival and has been held in Aamby Valley every year in December since 2013. A large number of artists have performed in EVC, from Indian artists such as Farhan Akhtar and Arijit Singh, Ankur Sood, Badshah, Juggy D, DJ Chetas, DASU, Papon, Shilpi Sharma and Ami Mishra, to international artists like Bullzeye, Dj Rae, Steve Aoki, Flo Rida, Alan Walker, Tiësto, Fatoboy Slim, David Guetta, Martin Garrix, Taio Cruz and Bassjackers.

== Organization ==
The festival is organized by Twisted Entertainment and Universal Music India, a subsidiary of Universal Music Group, each owning 50 per cent stake. Devraj Sanyal, managing director and chief executive officer, South Asia, is the current CEO of EVC. It is sponsored by Absolute Vodka, and Gozoop is in charge of digital marketing in Enchanted Valley Carnival. Different facilities can be found inside the festival like ATM machines, charging stations for electronic devices, parking lots, lost-and-found, food and beverages.

=== Camping ===
EVC Pune offers tent accommodations at the venue, named the "Enchanted Village." It allows the participants to stay at the festival venue in tents for the three-day long weekend. The regular tents allow from two to four people; the luxury tent is for four people. They also let people bring their own tent, with no maximum capacity.

=== 'Culinarium' ===
In 2015, EVC introduced a set of food stands called the ‘Culinarium.’ It offers street and gourmet cuisines, also pop up restaurants that were created to taste various dishes.
