= National Institute of Technology, Goa =

Engineering institution in Goa, india

Coordinates: 15.412423207330217°N 73.97820203385662°E

- Motto: Sa Vidya Ya Vimuktaye
- Motto in English: True Knowledge Liberates
- Type: Public
- Established: 2010; 16 years ago
- Chairperson: Bollineni Raja Gopal Naidu
- Director: O. R. Jaiswal
- Students: 1000
- Location: Cuncolim, South Goa District, Goa, India
- Acronym: NITG
- Nickname: NITians
- Website: www.nitgoa.ac.in

National Institute of Technology Goa (also known as NIT Goa or NITG) is an engineering institution in the Indian state of Goa. It was founded in 2010 being one of the 31 National Institutes of Technology in India and is recognised as an Institute of National Importance. It admitted its first batch of students in 2010-11.

== History ==
The NITG is one of ten newly set up NITs during the 11th Five Year Plan by the Ministry of Human Resources Development (HRD). The institute was to be set up using Rs 250 crore provided by central government. The first batch of students was admitted and academic activities of NIT Goa were started in the year 2010-11. During its initial years, NIT Goa was mentored by National Institute of Technology Karnataka, Surathkal and the Goa State Government had proposed that 50% of the seats in this Institute should be reserved for the State of Goa. However, the Union HRD ministry wants Daman and Diu, Dadra and Nagar Haveli and Lakshwadweep students to be grouped with Goa students for the 50% reservation.

== Campus ==
The campus is located at cuncolim, Madgoan approximately 29 km south-side of Panaji, the capital of Goa. The state of Goa is well connected by roadways, railways and airways with various parts of the country. The permanent campus, an area of 300 acres, spanning from Cuncolim to Balli, was identified by the state but the project ran into trouble when locals objected to the proposal as 50% exclusive reservation was not promised for Goan students. The former Chief Minister of Goa, Mr. Manohar Parrikar reiterated that no land will be given to the institute if 50% reservation is not provided for Goan students. The Government of India finally decided to reserve 50 per cent of the seats exclusively for Goan students in the National Institute of Technology, Goa from academic year 2012-13. Now NIT Goa is operating from its permanent campus.

== Academics ==
The Institute offers under Graduate courses in Five Engineering Departments: (1) Computer Science and Engineering (2) Electronics and Communication Engineering (3) Electrical and Electronics Engineering (4) Civil Engineering and (5) Mechanical Engineering. The Institute offers Post Graduate courses and Ph. D degree in three Engineering Departments: (1) Computer Science and Engineering (2) Electronics and Communication Engineering and (3) Electrical and Electronics Engineering. The Institute also offers Ph.D degree in Physics, Chemistry, Mathematics, Economics and English specialization.

The Institute admits students into the B.Tech degree program on the basis of ranks obtained in the Joint Entrance Examination JEE(Main) and the scheme of Direct Admission to Students Abroad (DASA) with an intake of 38 students in each branch.

For M.Tech Programme, the Institute admits students through valid GATE score followed by CCMT (Centralized Counselling for M.Tech Admissions). Each department is offering 25 seats for the said programme, out of which 23 seats will be filled up through CCMT and the remaining 2 seats are meant for the sponsored candidates.

=== Ranking ===
University rankings

Engineering – India
- NIRF (2022): 88
- NIRF (2023): 90
- NIRF (2024): 127

NIT Goa is ranked 90th among the engineering colleges of India by National Institutional Ranking Framework (NIRF) in 2023.

== Departments ==
=== Undergraduate Programme ===
- Computer Science Engineering
- Electrical & Electronics Engineering
- Electronics & Communication Engineering
- Civil Engineering
- Mechanical Engineering

=== Postgraduate programme ===
- VLSI
- Power Electronics and Power Systems
- Computer Science and Engineering

=== Doctoral programme ===
- Computer Science & Engineering
- Electrical & Electronics Engineering
- Electronics & Communication Engineering
- Civil Engineering
- Mechanical Engineering
- Humanities and Social Sciences
- Physics
- Chemistry
- Mathematics

== Facilities ==
The Campus Consists of various classrooms, laboratories, administrative section and each classroom, laboratory and conference hall possess advanced facilities such as multimedia projectors and internet.

A Central Library and center centres were set up exclusively for NIT Goa students, while hostel and dining facilities have also been provided on the campus. Two cafeterias and facilities for sports and games have been created.

== Student life ==
The annual technocultural festival "SAAVYAS", is generally held in February. Other cultural activities include Fresher's Night "AURORA". Institute alumni meet and departmental gatherings. Department also hold workshops, guest lectures and various competitions. Sports facilities includes cricket, volleyball, badminton, table tennis, football, kabaddi and carrom.

The institute also has The Programming Chapter, music club, Photography club, "Quanta" quiz club, Tesla club, spectra club, "Mathemania", SPIE chapter and robotics club. Apart from that the institute also organize Hindi Saptah.
