= Baytakhol =

Stretch of road in Goa, India

- Panaji - Farmagudi - Margao Highway Bypass Road
- Location within Goa Location within India
- Type: Isolated highway
- Maintained by: Borim village panchayat
- Length: 700 m (2,300 ft)
- Width: 10 metres (33 ft)
- Location: Baytakhol-Borim, Ponda, Goa, India
- Postal code: 403401
- Coordinates: 15°22′33.74″N 74°0′31.82″E
- Major junctions: Baytakhol-Borim Circle

Other
- Known for: Ghostlore
- Website: villagepanchayatborim.com

Baytakhol (Note: Alternatively spelt as Bythokhol, Baithakhol or Bhaithakol.) is a stretch of road that connects the residential district of Dhavali with the census town of Borim in Goa, a coastal state in India. This stretch of road has gained attention due to a series of accidents that have occurred, resulting in loss of lives. According to local legends, there are claims of a ghostly presence associated with the road, specifically the spirit of a young woman.

== Ghostlore ==
The Baytakhol road has been associated with a significant number of vehicle accidents, according to a report by The Free Press Journal. It is believed that these accidents are triggered by a peculiar phenomenon involving a young girl who emits piercing screams while positioned in the middle of the road. Witnesses claim that upon seeing the girl, a sense of fear and unease overwhelms them. However, as they attempt to comprehend the situation and turn their attention back to the road, the girl mysteriously disappears. This sudden disappearance allegedly causes drivers to lose control of their vehicles, leading to numerous accidents.

According to accounts documented by Hengul J Das and Shikha Gautam of The Times of India, the drivers claim to have witnessed the presence of a woman standing in the middle of the road. Allegedly, as vehicles approach her, this female figure emits distressing vocalizations. Upon turning their gaze away from the figure and subsequently looking back, drivers have reported observing nothing in her stead. Numerous accidents have occurred in the vicinity, with drivers experiencing a loss of control over their vehicles upon encountering this perplexing scenario. It is postulated that the unsettling visual and auditory experiences may induce an illusory state, thereby contributing to these incidents.

According to an anecdote relayed by Knocksense, there exists an incident involving two individuals traversing the Baytakhol road. During their journey, they chanced upon a distressed woman in a state of tears beside the roadside. Intrigued by her plight, they opted to retrace their path and extend her a ride in their vehicle. However, their search for her proved futile, as she seemed to have vanished without a trace. To their astonishment, upon reentering the car, both occupants simultaneously beheld the same woman seated in the backseat, her gaze fixed upon them through the rearview mirror. Yet, when they swiftly turned around to address her presence directly, she inexplicably disappeared. This road has gained notoriety for its propensity for accidents, and it is not uncommon for individuals to recount encounters with a female hitchhiker who solicits transportation.

According to reports from Incredible Goa magazine, in accordance with the local folklore in the Baytakhol-Borim region, there have been numerous claims of paranormal activity involving the ghost of an infant. This supernatural entity is said to be frequently spotted in the area. Additionally, there are reported incidents where spectral women suddenly cross the road in front of passing vehicles, accompanied by blood-curdling laughter.

== Incidents ==
On 17 April 2020, an incident occurred involving a 22-year-old migrant footwear seller named Mansoor Hussain Shaikh, hailing from Gadag district in Karnataka, India. Shaikh, who resided in Bablyakhali, Nagzar-Curti, was involved in the kidnapping and subsequent murder of his 17-year- old former girlfriend. The event took place in the Baytakhol-Borim area. It is believed that Shaikh committed the act out of frustration caused by the girl's choice to end their relationship.

On 13 April, the victim residing in the Usgao area of North Goa, who was also a migrant, departed from her residence to visit a sub-district hospital in Ponda for a medical examination. However, she did not return home and was reported missing by her family members. Despite their efforts to locate her, they were unsuccessful in finding any leads. Consequently, they sought assistance from the Ponda Police, who promptly registered a formal complaint regarding her disappearance.

In the early morning of 13 April, the remains of the girl were discovered in an advanced state of decomposition. The grisly find was made by residents of Borim, who were engaged in the collection of cashew nuts within the vicinity of a Water Resources Department (WRD) tank located in a nearby forested area. The pungent odor emanating from the decomposed body drew the attention of the cashew nut collectors, ultimately leading them to the discovery within the pump house. Recognizing the gravity of the situation, the locals promptly notified the authorities, alerting the police to the find.

In a swift response to the information received regarding a body, the police successfully solved the case within a relatively short period of eight to ten hours. According to law enforcement officials, the accused individual was responsible for strangling the victim in the pump house of the WRD tank. Upon arrival at the scene, the police discovered an abandoned body in the control room of the water tank. The appearance of the body matched that of a teenage girl who had been reported missing. To investigate the incident, a police team led by Deputy Superintendent of Police Albuquerque was formed, with the inclusion of Collem PI Prajyot S Fadte and Ponda PI Mohan Gaude.

Shaikh and the girl maintained a cordial relationship for approximately one year. However, their bond recently deteriorated, resulting in the girl terminating her association with Shaikh. As a consequence, the girl's parents made arrangements for her to marry another young man. During the course of the investigation, authorities uncovered that the victim was picked up by her ex-boyfriend from a hospital and transported on his scooter to a pump house situated at Baytakhol hillock. It was at this location where he confronted her regarding the proposed matrimonial alliance with another individual.

On the morning of 13 April, Shaikh perpetrated the violent act resulting in the victim's death through assault and strangulation. Following the incident, the accused fled the scene. Prior to the incident, there existed a close relationship between the accused and the victim, characterized by affection. However, the victim had decided to end the relationship, which caused distress and feelings of rejection for the accused. In their investigation, local authorities, including Ponda DySP Nelson Albuquerque, conducted interviews with potential suspects and the girl's family members.

According to official statements, the police in Ponda, Goa, claimed that their investigation led them to apprehend a suspect on the same day. The arrest was made possible through the diligent efforts of a team consisting of Arvind Gawas, the Superintendent of Police for South Goa, Albuquerque, the Deputy Superintendent of Police for Ponda, Mohan Gaude, the Police Inspector for Ponda, and other members of the police force. The Deputy Inspector General Parmaditya visited the Ponda police station to commend the team for successfully capturing the suspect within a span of ten hours. As a token of recognition, he awarded a cash prize of ₹15,000 (equivalent to ₹18,000 or US$180 in 2023) to all those involved in the case. The police have filed charges against the suspect under Section 302 and 363 of the Indian Penal Code, as well as Section 8 of the Goa Children Act. Shaikh was apprehended by law enforcement authorities and subsequently placed under the custody of the police.

In August 2020, an incident took place at the Borim bridge, resulting in the deaths of three linemen from the state electricity department. The accident occurred when a truck, transporting the linemen and a number of electricity poles, overturned while attempting to maneuver through the circle. This incident is not an isolated occurrence, as similar accidents have been reported at the Baytakhol Circle when motorists have encountered difficulties while navigating around it.

On 10 May 2022, an incident occurred on the Ponda-Margao highway, resulting in the death of Vinayak Chari, a 36-year-old tipper truck driver. While navigating the downhill portion of the road, his vehicle veered off course and collided with a valley along the roadside. This collision proved fatal for Chari, who resided in Sanguem and held ownership of the tipper truck involved in the accident.

According to the authorities at the Ponda police department, the incident occurred at around 3:30 p.m. The truck was en route from the Khorlim depot to Sanguem, transporting empty glass bottles used for soft drinks. The owner of the tipper truck, who occasionally assumes the role of the driver, was the sole occupant as his regular driver was absent due to leave. While passing through Baytakhol in Borim, the driver lost control of the vehicle, leading to a collision with the adjacent roadside valley.

The driver became trapped within the vehicle and suffered fatal injuries as a result of the collision. Emergency personnel swiftly responded to the scene and made efforts to extricate the driver from the vehicle by removing the door. Unfortunately, despite their rescue attempts, medical professionals at the hospital pronounced the driver deceased upon arrival. In this particular instance, a case of an untimely demise was officially recorded, and an investigation was initiated. Law enforcement authorities communicated that Chari was survived by his spouse and two infants who are eight months old.

In January 2023, an incident occurred on the road between Ponda and Margao involving an Eicher Motors truck transporting power insulators. While navigating the Baytakhol-Borim Circle, the truck overturned. Fortunately, the outcome was fortuitous for the roadside vendors, as the truck veered off course and collided with a parked Mahindra Bolero tempo before coming to rest on its side. This timely collision prevented a potentially tragic outcome, as it could have resulted in the loss of six lives.

During the course of maneuvering through a circular road, the truck driver encountered an unforeseen incident when a rickshaw suddenly appeared directly in front of the truck, originating from the Betora direction. In an attempt to avoid a collision with the rickshaw, the truck driver applied the brakes, but unfortunately lost control of the vehicle. Fortunately, the tempo happened to be positioned near a roadside vendor's stall, where watermelons were being loaded. The truck collided with the tempo, causing it to tip over onto its side.

The presence of the tempo has been credited with potentially preventing the tragic accident. Local residents assert that had the Bolero tempo not been parked at the roadside, the lives of these vendors could have been endangered. This assertion is supported by past incidents where trucks have toppled over in the same location.

== 2023 road widening ==
In October 2023, the road widening initiative for the Baytakhol-Borim to Curti stretch recommenced. Although a significant portion of the stretch had already undergone expansion, the surplus area is presently serving as a parking facility for truck drivers and has also become a habitat for stray cattle.

The road widening project, which has been in progress for several months, experienced a temporary slowdown during the monsoon season. However, following the conclusion of Ganesh Chaturthi festivities, the project resumed at an accelerated pace. During this time, container trucks were observed occupying the newly widened road, creating potential hazards for regular traffic.

In certain areas, the presence of stray cattle on roadways has posed significant dangers to motorists, particularly those riding two-wheeled vehicles. There have been instances where two-wheeler riders have sustained injuries when colliding with cattle, especially during nighttime conditions. Furthermore, both stray cattle and dogs are known to frequent this particular location in order to scavenge for food amidst the garbage that is discarded along the roadside.

In response to significant resistance from the community, authorities issued directives to truckers, advising them against parking their vehicles in Curti. However, truck owners from different states have disregarded these instructions and have begun parking their trucks along the extended stretch. It is worth noting that a previous incident occurred where an unidentified individual stole mobile phones and cash from parked trucks by incapacitating the drivers using chloroform.

== Popular culture ==
In 2018, a horror web series with the same title as the road Baytakhol was announced to be released on Amazon Prime. The cast included Sushrii Shreya Mishraa, Prateik Babbar, Rahul Dev, Kenny Sebastian, Dipannita Sharma, Diandra Soares, Isha Koppikar, Bani J, Lopamudra Raut, and Meghana Kaushik.

== See also ==
- List of reportedly haunted locations in India
