= Codar =

Village in Goa, India

Coordinates: 15°24′N 74°03′E

Codar is a village located in the Ponda taluka (sub-district) of Goa. It is alternatively spelt as Kodar. Codar is known for being home to the Goa Government Agricultural Farm.

== Area and population ==
According to the 2011 Census of India, Codar has an area of 975.28 hectares, a total of 172 households, and a population of 733. The population is composed of 366 males and 367 females, with an under-six years population of 62, consisting of 28 boys and 34 girls.

== Location ==
Codar is located in the eastern part of Ponda taluka. It lies approximately 10 kilometres (6.2 mi) from the sub-district headquarters of Ponda town and approximately 39 kilometres (24 mi) away from the district North Goa headquarters of Panaji or Panjim. Codar is situated to the east of Betora and Ponda town. In the vicinity of Codar, you can find Tisk, Nirancal, Dabal, Siddhanath Hill, and Curti.

== Local jurisdiction ==
Codar is administered by the Betora-Nirancal gram panchayat. It encompasses the areas of Betora, Nirancal, Conxem and Codar. As of 2017, the sarpanch (village council chief) was Sushant Gaonkar, and his deputy sarpanch was Manda Gaude.
