= D'Mello House =

Abandoned bungalow in Goa, India

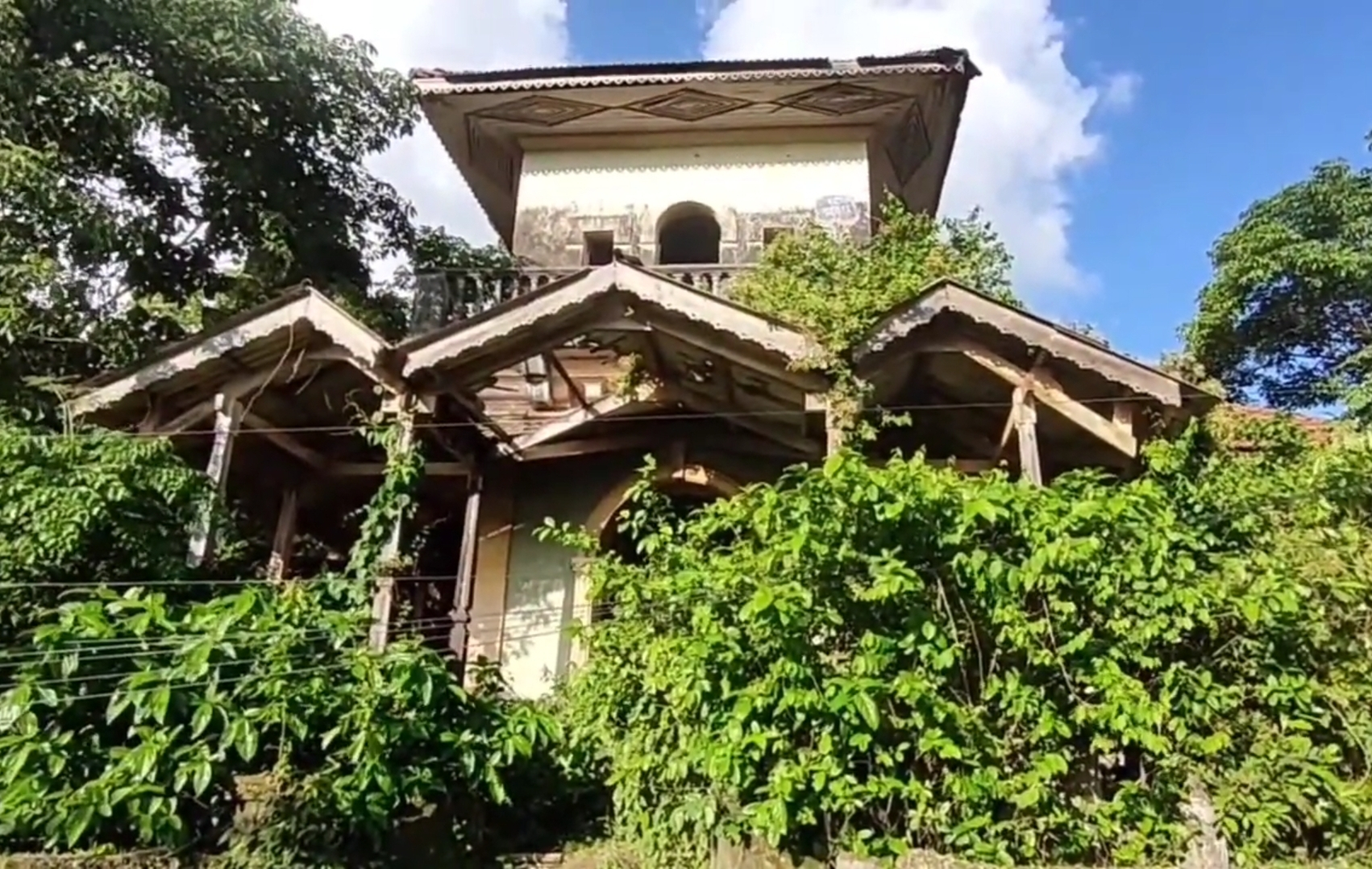
- Façade of the D'Mello House, 2021
- Etymology: House of D'Mellos'

General information
- Status: Abandoned, dilapidated
- Type: Mansion/Bungalow
- Architectural style: Portuguese colonial architecture
- Address: Santimol, Raia, Goa, India 403720
- Coordinates: 15°18′54.48″N 73°59′45.23″E
- Opened: Prior to 1970s
- Owner: De Melo family
- Known for: Village folklore

D'Mello House is an abandoned mansion that was built during the Portuguese rule in Goa. It is located in Santimol, Raia, and is described as one of the most haunted places in Goa.

== Condition ==
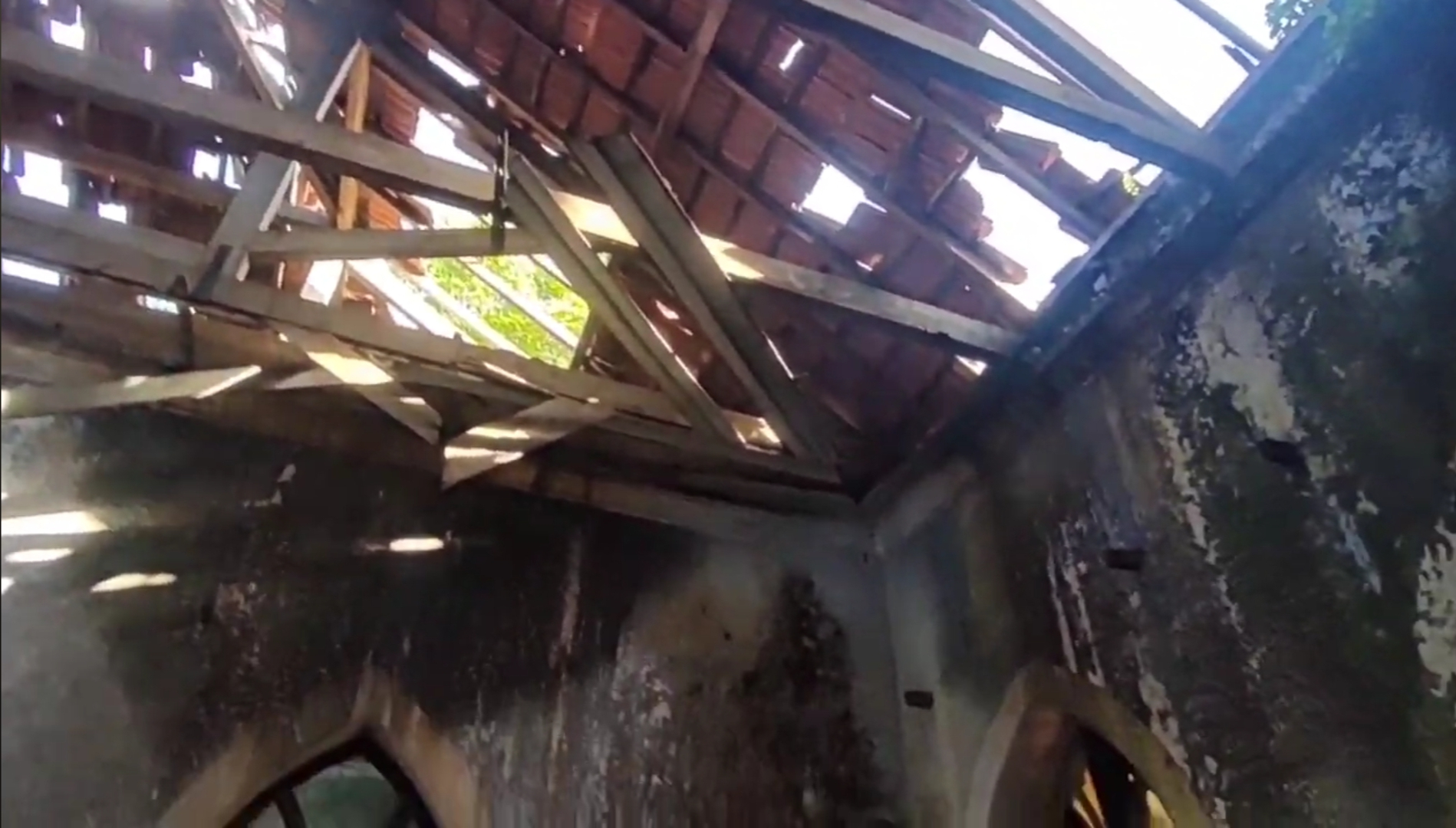
The roof and walls of the house, 2021

The D'Mello House is a dilapidated mansion situated on a hillside, evoking a distinct atmosphere reminiscent of a haunted setting often depicted in movies. The dimly lit rooms, worn-out walls, and sporadically growing plants contribute to an ambiance that exudes an air of mystery. Described by Vijaya Karnataka, the house features a deteriorating roof, fragments of shattered glass, and the walls partially covered by the roots of a large tree. The presence of a broken door and similar elements collectively instill an unspoken sense of fear in the observer's psyche.

== Folklore ==
In local folklore, there is a tale surrounding the house that centers around two brothers who were the rightful owners and residents of the property. Inherited from previous generations, the brothers initially shared a harmonious relationship. However, a dispute arose between them regarding the ownership of the ancestral property, leading to a tragic event where one brother killed the other. Strangely, shortly thereafter, the brother who committed the act of fratricide also met his demise. The exact circumstances of his death remain a mystery, shrouded in uncertainty and unknown to this day.

In accordance with one narrative, the brother, who had previously been slain, purportedly returned in the form of a soul to exact revenge upon his murderer. This tale swiftly gained popularity, sparking widespread conversations surrounding the demise of these siblings. Concurrently, another narrative emerged, recounting the perpetual journey of the very same pair of souls. According to this story, both individuals, having tragically lost their lives in a dispute over a bungalow, now wander aimlessly as restless spirits, plagued by unhappiness.

The D'Mello House gained notoriety due to a widely circulated narrative claiming that the spirits of the deceased brother and his family continue to inhabit its premises. The house is also believed to be afflicted by a curse, preventing any subsequent family from reaching a peaceful resolution regarding the distribution of the estate. Additionally, numerous individuals have claimed to have heard eerie shrieking noises emanating from the house during nighttime, which are frequently attributed to the presence of the deceased brother's spirit.

== Analysis ==
Maria de Lourdes Bravo da Costa Rodrigues, of The Navhind Times, encountered an article on fearandyou.in that discussed the D'Mello House. In her own article, she expressed her familiarity with the D'Mello family and raised questions about the validity of the information presented on fearandyou.in, emphasizing the need for substantiation of the writer's imaginative claims.

In the context of the village of Raia, da Costa Rodrigues made an assumption regarding the whereabouts of Santimol and concluded that there is no corresponding house in the specified ward, based on her consultation with her sister-in-law, who resided in the same village. It is worth noting that there existed a neglected house belonging to the De Melo family in Raia, which was abandoned several years ago when the owners relocated to Panaji.

The fearandyou.in website raised questions about whether it pertains to the same house. The house, which was previously well-maintained during the time of the mother's presence, fell into a state of abandonment after she died. In fact, the house served as a venue for the son's wedding reception in the 1970s. However, with no occupants, the house became a target for trespassers and criminals who would break in through doors and windows. It is speculated that these individuals spread rumors and create noises in order to deter others from entering the house, allowing them to use it undisturbed.

In accordance with Vijaya Karnataka, the house is primarily associated with horror stories, and there is no documented evidence of negative energy within the premises, except for individuals who hold such beliefs. Additionally, it is not uncommon for people to hear accounts of a brother's murder and the mysterious death of another individual in relation to this property. There have been instances where broken liquor bottles have been discovered within the house, leading to speculation that individuals who gather there to consume alcohol may be responsible for peculiar noises and the resulting sense of fear. However, these claims remain uncertain. The prevalence of ghostly rumors surrounding the house has dissuaded its owners from returning, and potential buyers have been reluctant to acquire the property.

== In popular culture ==
- In January 2021, the D'Mello House was described on episode 33 of the SYWK Podcast: Everything About Paranormal.
- In August 2022, the D'Mello house was featured on the episode "Dmello House Goa Haunted Story In Hindi: What Happened There" of the Thrilling Weekends podcast.

== See also ==
- List of reportedly haunted locations in India
