= Sina Hotel =

Abandoned five-star hotel in Goa, India

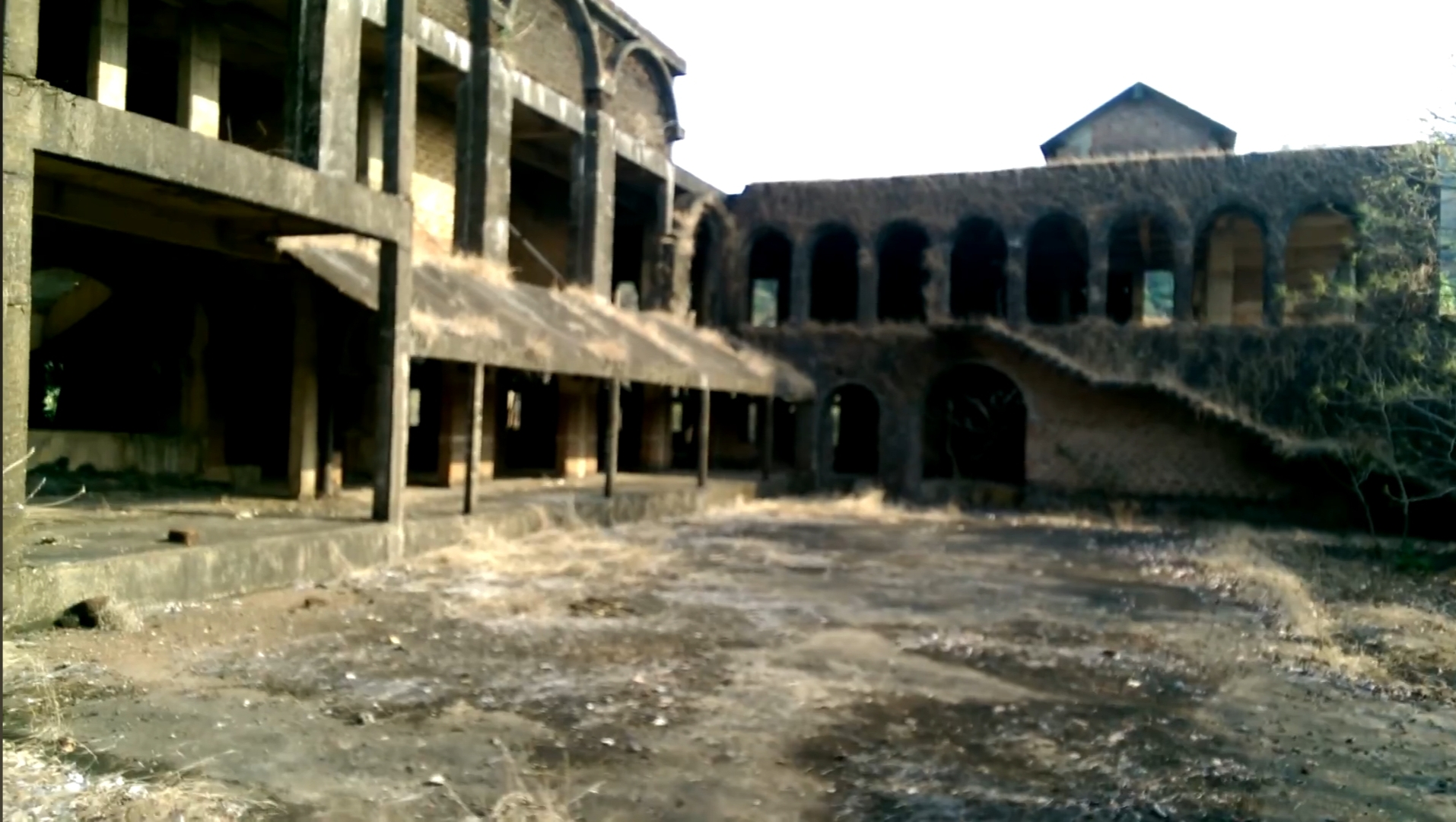
- Within the premises of the hotel, 2015
- Interactive map of the Sina Hotel area
- Alternative names: Ghost Hotel; Devil's Hotel

General information
- Status: Abandoned, dilapidated
- Type: Five-star hotel
- Location: Agonda, Goa, India
- Coordinates: 15°1′48.62″N 73°59′41.18″E
- Construction stopped: Early 1990s

The Sina Hotel, popularly referred to as the Ghost Hotel, is an abandoned hotel complex situated in Agonda, in the Indian coastal state of Goa. Originally envisioned and initiated by a group of Russians, the construction of the hotel encountered numerous legal challenges, preventing its successful completion. As a result, the hotel gradually deteriorated over time, remaining in a state of abandonment.

The hotel, originally intended to be a five-star establishment within its area, encountered a setback during its construction phase in the early 1990s. The project came to an abrupt halt due to financial constraints experienced by the owners, resulting in an incomplete structure. The hotel's development was further marred by an incident involving the murder of one of its owners.

== Description ==
The Sina Hotel is situated at the southernmost stretch of Agonda Beach in South Goa, India. Accessible via either a forest path or the main road, the hotel is surrounded by a lush canopy of trees. Sunil M1 of Vijaya Karnataka, observed that the hotel's serene ambiance evokes a sense of tranquility and satisfaction. Consequently, the hotel has come to be informally known as the "Devil's Hotel."

== Ghostlore ==
Incredible Goa reports that there are multiple accounts regarding the state of the hotel in question, each offering different explanations for its current condition. However, one prevalent narrative links the hotel's state to alleged paranormal phenomena, specifically the death of one of its owners. According to this story, the owner was purportedly murdered, leading to the halt in construction. Local villagers assert that the spirit of the deceased individual continues to wander within the premises of the property.

Its Goa magazine documented that subsequent to the death of one of its proprietors, local residents began noticing unusual phenomena occurring within the rooms of the hotel complex. As a result, the establishment gained notoriety for unsettling tourists with its eerie occurrences in various rooms.

According to a report by Sunil M1 in Vijaya Karnataka, there is a prevailing belief among the local community that the deceased owner of the hotel complex is manifesting in a physical form and wandering within its premises. This belief has led to a significant decline in visitors to the hotel, resulting in a peculiar situation where trees have been able to grow inside its structure.

According to reports documented by Knocksense, visitors to Agonda beach have occasionally reported hearing unusual sounds originating from the hotel. Furthermore, there have been complaints regarding the presence of an unidentified entity believed to be traversing the abandoned halls.

== See also ==
- List of reportedly haunted locations in India
