= Tulsidas Borkar =

Indian composer (1934–2018)

- Born: 18 November 1934; Borim, Goa, Portuguese India
- Origin: India
- Died: 29 September 2018 (aged 83) Mumbai, Maharashtra, India
- Genre: Indian classical Hindustani Classical Music
- Occupations: Harmonium player, Reed Organ player, composer
- Instruments: Harmonium, Reed Organ
- Years active: 1945–2018

Tulsidas Jayashree Vasant Borkar (18 November 1934 – 29 September 2018) was an Indian composer and harmonium player. The Government of India awarded him the civilian honour of the Padma Shri in 2016.

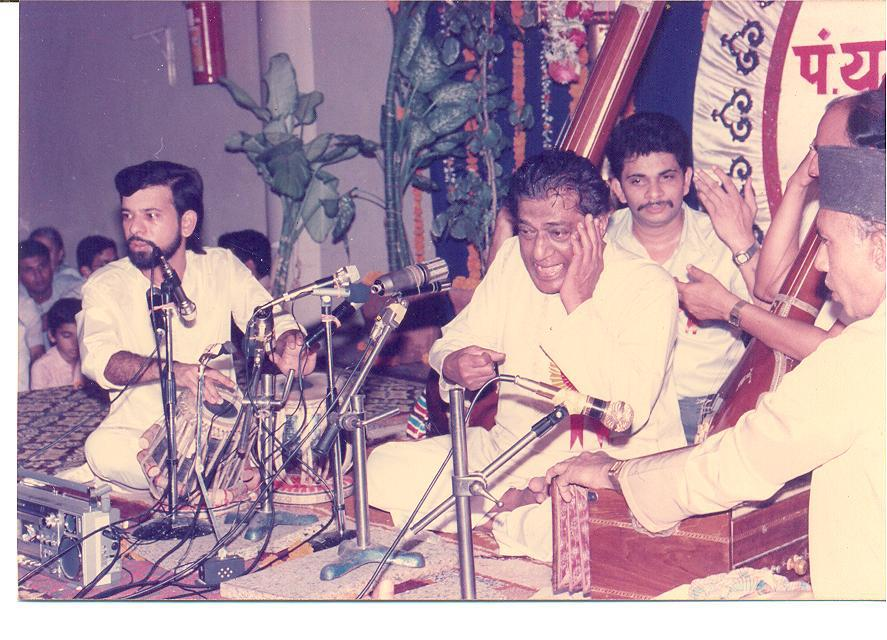
Borkar accompanying Chota Gandharva

== Early life ==
Tulsidas Vasant Borkar was born on 18 November 1934 in Borim, Portuguese Goa. He was married to Pratibha Borkar and three children.

== Awards ==
Borkar received a number of awards, including the Sangeet Natak Akademi Award, New Delhi (2005) and Padma Shri (2016). Other awards included:

- State Reward for Excellence from the Directorate of Art & Culture, Govt. of Goa (18 August 2007).
- Smt.Indirabai Khadilkar Puraskar (2006) by Bharat Gayan Samaj, Pune.
- Pt. Bandubhaiya Chaughule Smruti Puraskar, Indore (2004).
- Pt.Vitthalrao Korgaonkar Smruti Puraskar by Surel Samvadini Samvardhan- Belgaum (2002).
- ITC Sangeet Research Academy Award (2001).
- Master Dinanath Mangeshkar Smruti Gungaurav Puraskar (2000) from Yojana Pratishthan & Nirgudkar Foundation.
- Samrat Sanman from Samrat Club International, Goa.
- Balgandharva Gaurav Puraskar from Akhil Bhartiya Marathi Natya Parishad sponsored by Shrimant Madhavrao Maharaj Shinde (1999).
- Govindrao Tembe Sangatkar Puraskar (19 January 1998) from Akhil Bhartiya Gandharva Mahavidyalaya.
- Sangeetkar Padmashree Vasant Desai Puraskar from Marathi Natya Parishad, Natvarya Keshavrao Date Puraskar (1995).
- "Pandit Ram Marathe Puraskar".

== Death ==
Borkar had been diagnosed with tuberculosis and was treated in Mumbai's Nanavati Hospital. But, due to old age, his body didn't respond well to the treatment. He died at the age of 83 on 29 September 2018 in Mumbai.
