= Igorchem Bandh =

Dirt road in Goa, India

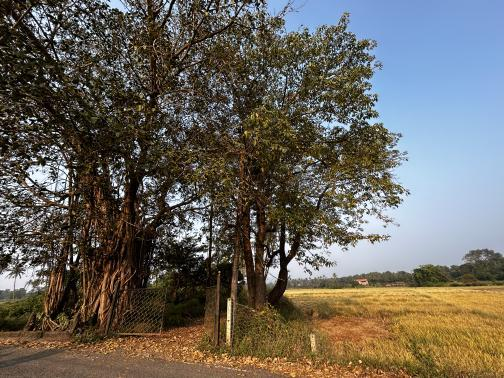
- The main gate of Igorchem Bandh, 2023

- Location within Goa Location within India
- Type: Isolated dirt road
- Maintained by: Raia panchayat
- Length: 340 m (1,120 ft)
- Location: Behind Our Lady of Snows Church, Raia, Goa, India 403719
- Coordinates: 15°18′52.47″N 73°59′20.31″E

Other
- Known for: Midday hauntings
- Status: Pedestrianised

Igorchem Bandh (transl. Church Road) is a road situated in the village of Raia, adjacent to Rachol, within the coastal state of Goa. It has gained attention for its association with midday hauntings. The name "Igorchem Bandh" is fittingly derived from its location behind the Church of Our Lady of Snows. This particular road has gained notoriety as a place where numerous individuals have reportedly experienced unusual occurrences.

The path area has gained notoriety due to a plethora of eerie haunting accounts. Witnesses have reported instances where individuals, shortly after experiencing possession, have met with bizarre and untimely deaths. Local residents have also attested to hearing inexplicable footsteps and the unsettling sound of heavy breathing emanating from the vicinity of trees and bushes, contributing to the pervasive ghostly ambiance of the location.

== Description ==
The Igorchem Bandh refers to a tranquil and isolated section of a typically picturesque road. According to Hengul J Das and Shikha Gautam of The Times of India, the profound stillness of the road, coupled with an air of mystique in the surrounding area, creates an ideal backdrop for a local legend. Steve Antao of ItsGoa characterizes the location as an eerie, slender, and desolate roadway.

== Folklore ==
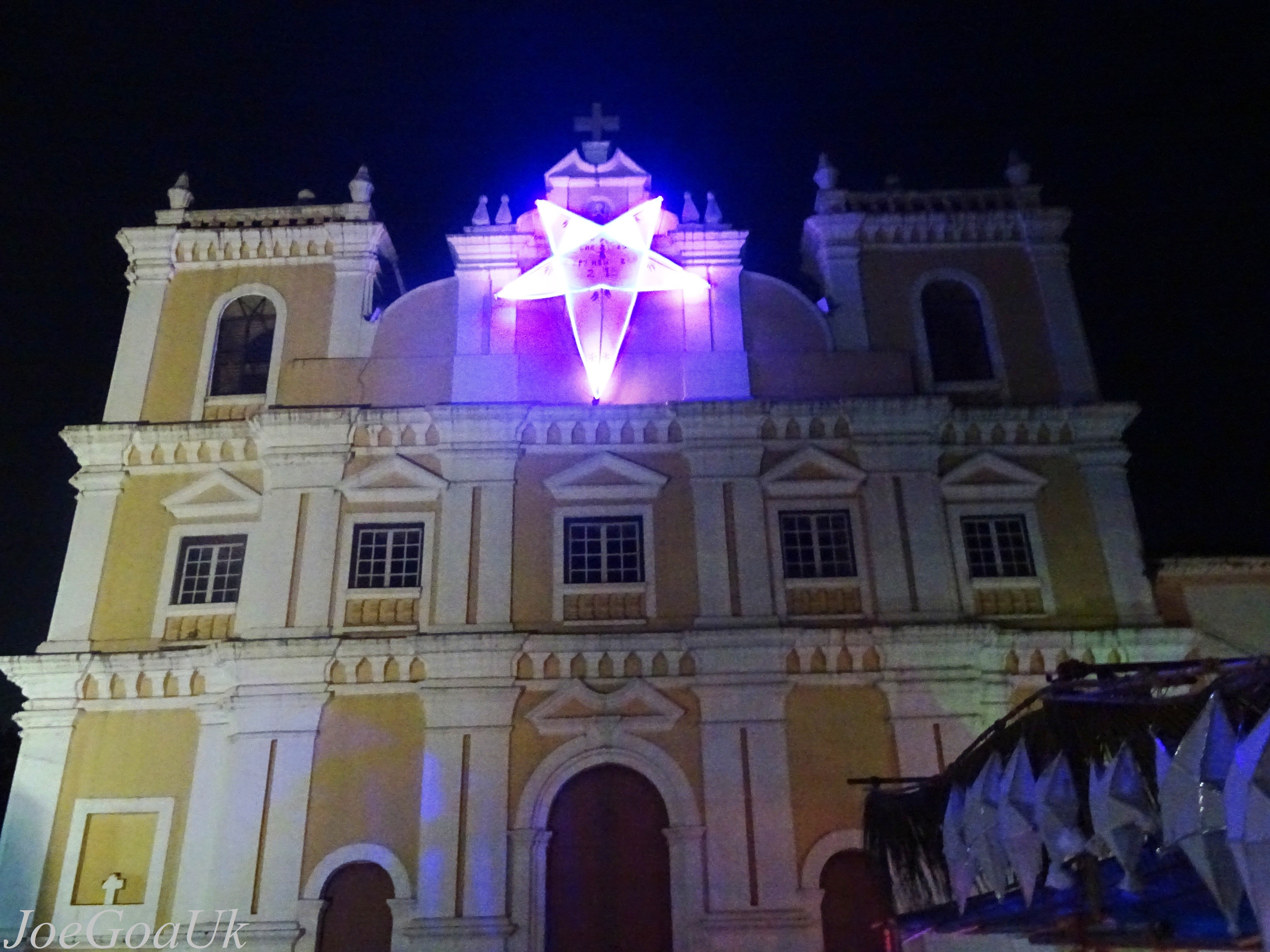
Façade of the Our Lady of Snows Church, Raia in 2014.

Fernando Monte da Silva, of The Goan Everyday, recounts a local legend associated with crossing the specific area known as the "bandh" (road) at 2 pm. According to the legend, crossing the bandh during this time allegedly results in feelings of dizziness and subsequent episodes of incomprehensible speech. However, from a logical perspective, it is plausible that such experiences could be attributed to a severe form of sunstroke.

According to Hengul J Das and Shikha Gautam of The Times of India, there is a local belief associated with this particular route. The belief suggests that individuals who travel along this route between 2 pm and 3 pm are susceptible to being possessed by an malevolent entity.

According to reports from Incredible Goa magazine, local villagers have long believed in the existence of numerous spirits in the region. These spirits are said to possess a powerful presence, even during daylight hours, and are known to occasionally harm humans. According to local folklore, these spirits specifically target individuals with low self-control, seeking to possess them. Once possessed, individuals reportedly exhibit unusual behavior, speaking in an incomprehensible language associated with ghosts. Additionally, their eyes allegedly turn red, and their complexion becomes pale. It is also believed that these malevolent spirits extract blood from their victims.

== In popular culture ==
- In November 2021, a podcast called Ectoplasm Show released episode 385 titled "Haunted Places in India," that featured a description of Igorchem Bandh.
- In October 2022, the Igorchem Bandh was featured in the book titled "Ghostlight" by the Canadian writer Kenneth Oppel.

== See also ==
- List of reportedly haunted locations in India
