= Three Kings Chapel =

Roman Catholic chapel in Goa, India

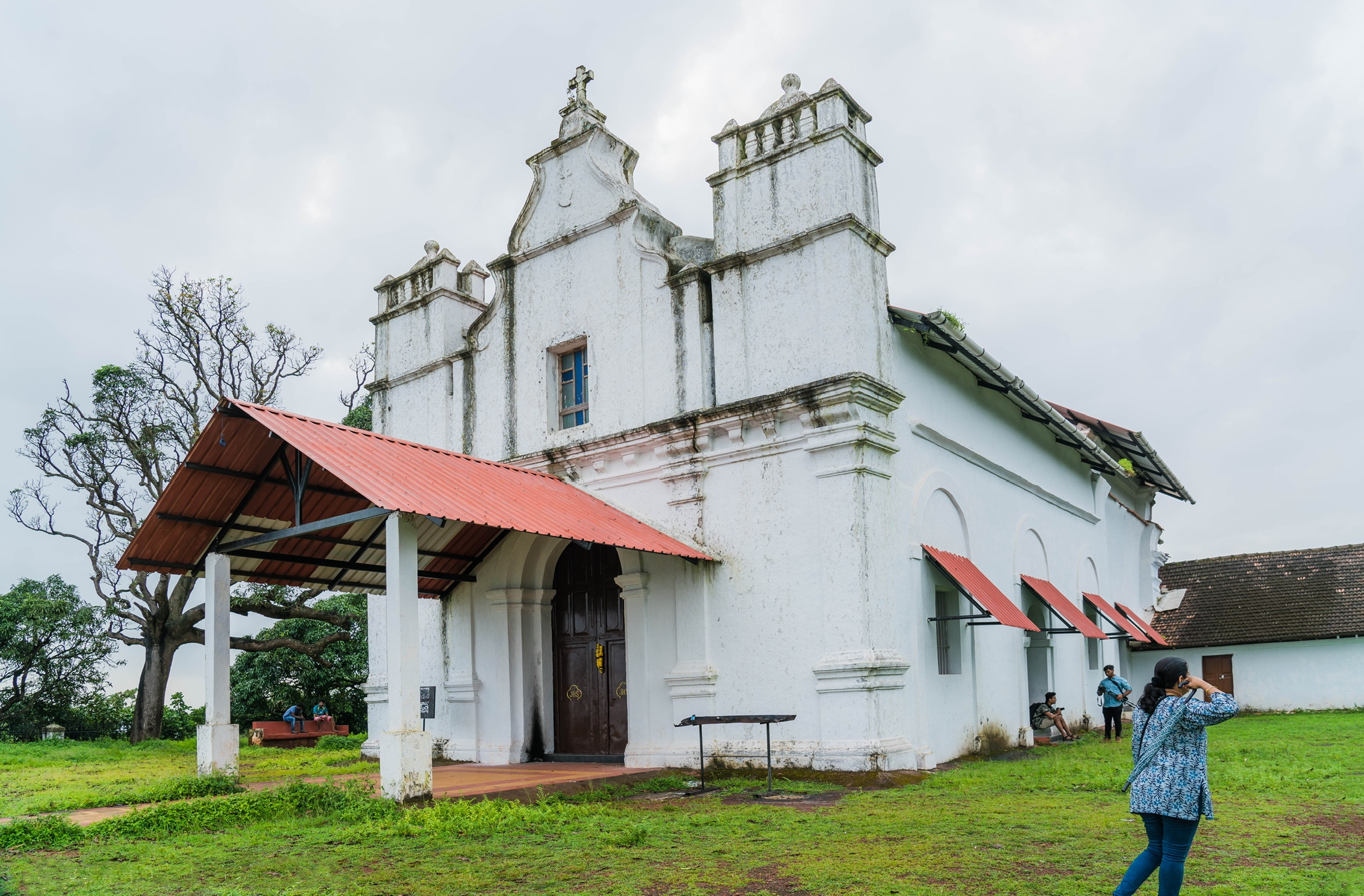
- Three Kings Chapel
- Three Kings Chapel
- 15.360411°N 73.900309°E
- Location: Cansaulim, Goa
- Country: India
- Denomination: Roman Catholic

History
- Status: Chapel
- Founded: 1599; 427 years ago
- Founder: Father Gonçalo Carvalho
- Dedication: Biblical Magi

Architecture
- Style: Baroque

Administration
- Archdiocese: Archdiocese of Goa and Daman

The Three Kings Chapel is a Roman Catholic chapel located on the hill of Cuelim in Cansaulim, Goa. It is primarily known for the annual feast of the Epiphany, celebrated on 6 January, which involves a traditional procession involving three young boys representing the Biblical Magi. It is also known as a haunted church in local folklore.

== History ==
The chapel was founded by Father Gonçalo Carvalho in 1599. It is affiliated with the Saint Thomas Church in Cansaulim.

== Feast ==
The chapel is one of three locations in Goa, alongside Chandor and Reis Magos, where the feast of the Three Kings is celebrated with significant local tradition. The event marks the end of the Twelve Days of Christmas. In Cansaulim, the celebration serves the three neighboring villages of Cansaulim, Arossim, and Cuelim.

During the feast, three boys aged between 8 and 12 are selected from the three villages to portray the kings. They travel on horseback through different paths across the hill, eventually meeting at the chapel for a high mass. The boys dress in royal attire, wearing crowns and gowns, and are accompanied by a procession of locals and brass bands. They then leave the chapel and take a tour to the Saint Thomas Church, stopping at multiple points for both, blessings and rest. After a ceremony at the church, they take multiple routes back home, in commemoration of the different routes taken by the Three Kings.

The feast is organised by the "vangodds" of the gauncars (indigenous people) from the three villages who helped build the early church.

== Location ==
The chapel is situated on a hillock that offers a panoramic view of the Arabian Sea and the landscape of South Goa. Because of its isolated and elevated position, it is a popular spot for tourists and photographers, especially during sunset.

== Folklore and haunting legends ==
The Three Kings Chapel is frequently associated with local legends of being haunted. According to popular folklore, the hill was once ruled by three brothers who were Portuguese kings who were constantly in conflict. The oldest was Holger Alvunger. In a bid to gain sole power, Holger invited the other two to the chapel for a meal and poisoned them. However, consumed by guilt or facing the wrath of the local subjects, the third king subsequently committed suicide by consuming the remaining poison.

Local stories suggest that the spirits of the three kings remain on the chapel grounds. Visitors and locals have reported unexplained sightings and sounds at the site after dark, leading to its reputation as one of the most haunted locations in Goa.

== Depiction in media ==
The chapel featured in the 2008 film Bhoothnath and the 2014 film Finding Fanny.

== See also ==
- List of reportedly haunted locations in India
