= Grand Paradi Towers =

Haunted building in India

Grand Paradi Towers is a building in Mumbai, Maharashtra which is said to be one of the most haunted sites in India and spookiest places in Mumbai. It is located in South Mumbai.

== History and structure ==
It was built in 1975 in Kemps Corner and in that time it was the home of rich people of the city. In that time it was one of the most expensive tower in the city. It consist of 28 storeys.

== Suicides and legends ==
From 1998, more than 20 residents have killed themselves by jumping from the building even maids and children have committed suicide. There is a belief that a bad ghost compelled them. The building is said to be cursed. Some people think that the eighth floor of this tower is unlucky or cursed as many people including three generations of a family have jumped from that floor. Some people believe that some evil or unseen entity forced them to commit suicide.
