= List of reportedly haunted locations in India =

This is a list of reportedly haunted locations in India.

== Andhra Pradesh ==
- Chittoor railway station: Believed to be haunted after the 2013 death of Central Reserve Police Force constable Hari Singh, who was attacked by Railway Protection Force officers and travelling ticket examiners aboard the Kerala Express to Delhi. Singh left the train at the Chittoor station and died of his injuries in hospital.

== Chhattisgarh ==
- Lal Bangla of Raipur is an abandoned villa near Serikhedi Interchange of Naya Raipur. It is regarded as the most haunted place in Raipur. Local legends say that a doctor and his daughter residing in the house witnessed an evil spirit during a total lunar eclipse in 1994, during which the daughter hid in a wardrobe out of terror and later found her father to be dead. The police officials involved in the subsequent investigation deemed the case to be mysterious as well. In 2012, Zee TV aired the story of Lal Bangla on episode no. 22 of the horror series Fear Files.

== Delhi ==
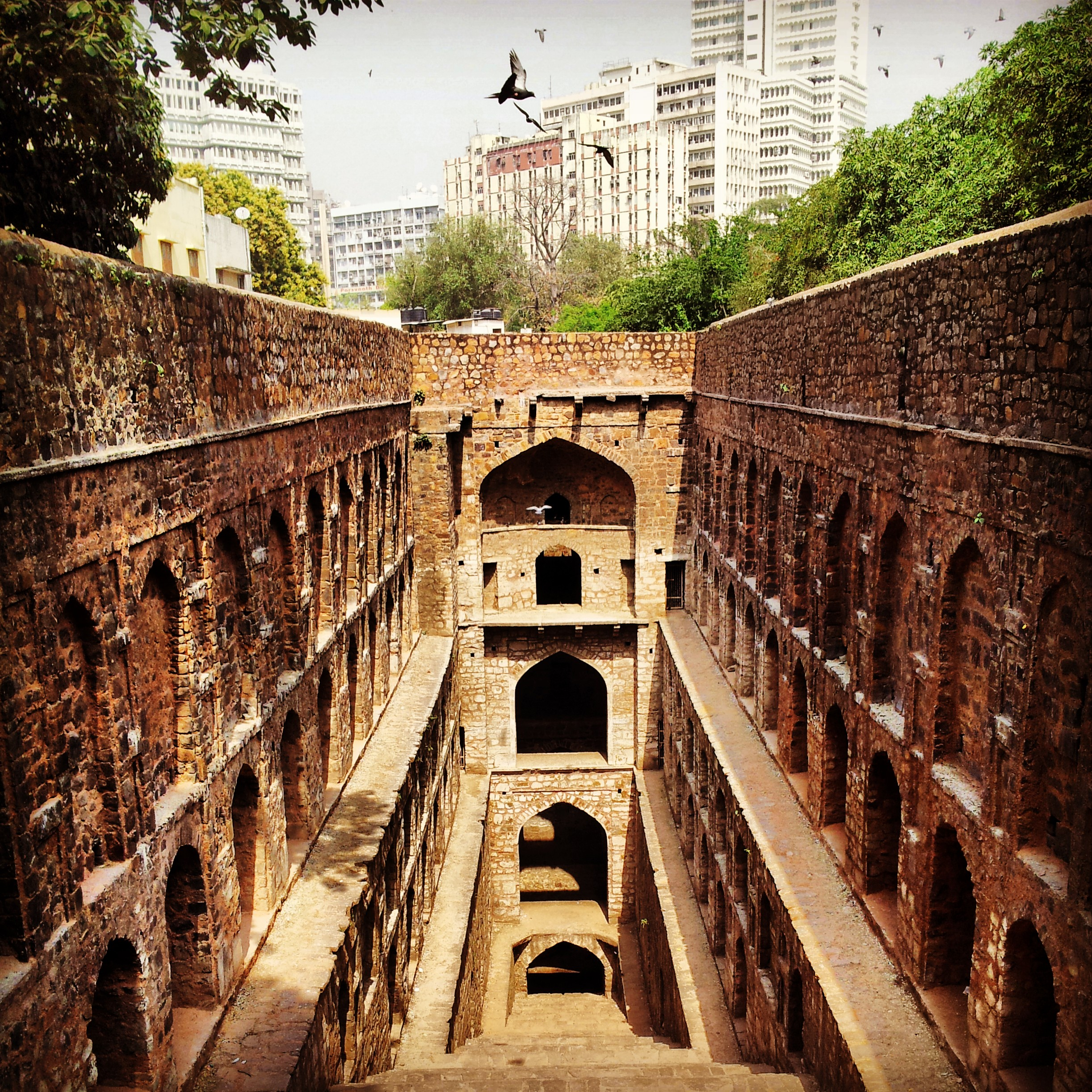
Agrasen Ki Baoli step well

- Agrasen Ki Baoli, New Delhi: A 60-meter long and 15-meter wide historical step well, it is believed to be haunted.
- Bhuli Bhatiyari Ka Mahal, Karol Bagh: Ruins of a 14th-century hunting lodge that is believed by some to be haunted.
- Delhi Cantonment, New Delhi: The more desolate parts of this area are believed to be haunted by spirits, including a female hitchhiker clad in a white saree.
- Jamali Kamali Mosque and Tomb, Mehrauli: Located in the archaeological village complex in Mehrauli, the site is believed to be haunted. There have been reports of people being slapped by invisible forces and ghostly voices being heard from adjoining graves. As a result, visiting fakirs call upon Jinns on every Thursday.
- Lothian Cemetery, Old Delhi: Believed to be haunted by the specter of General Nicholas, a British officer who committed suicide after learning that the woman he loved had married another man.

== Goa ==
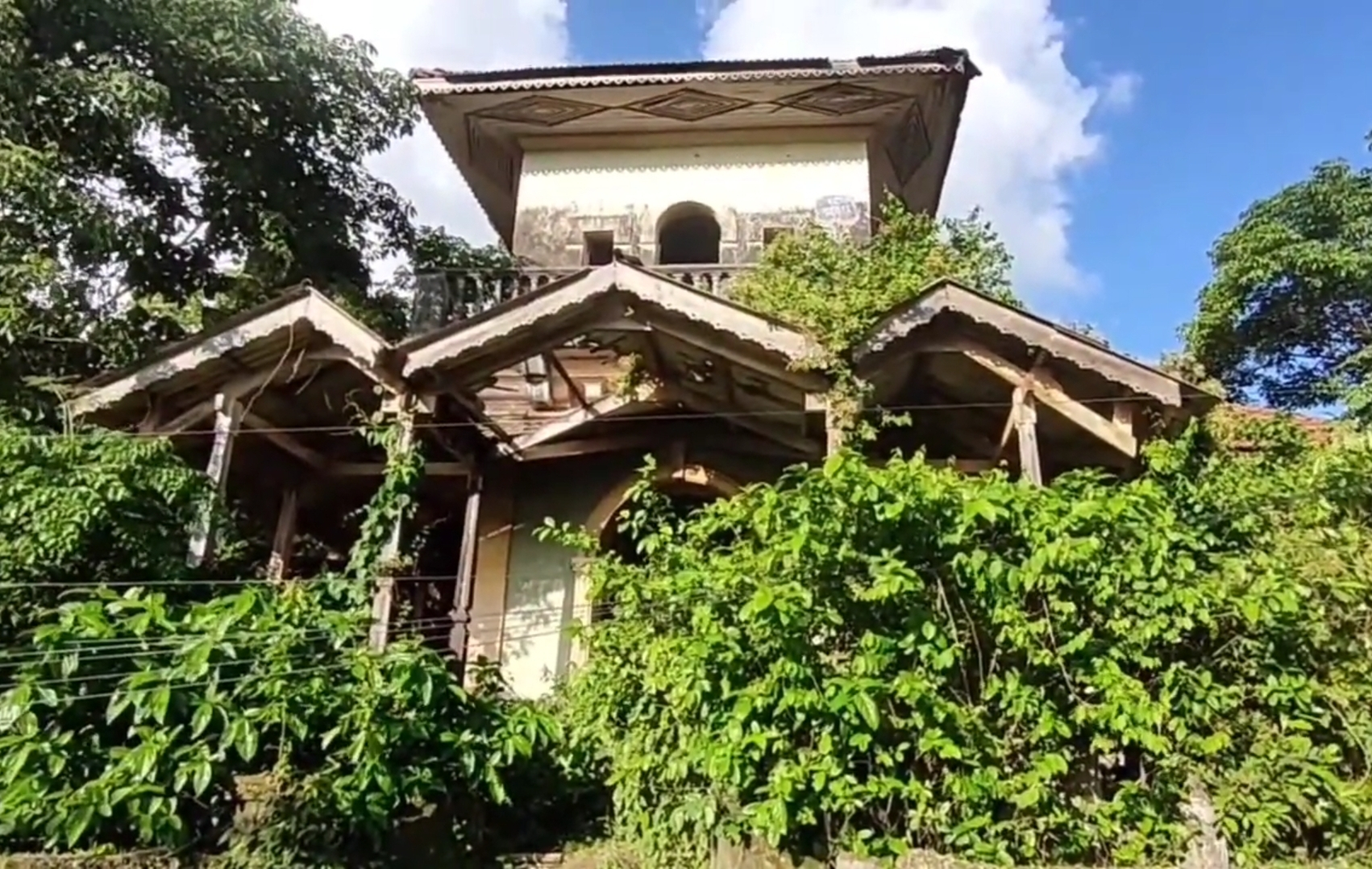
Façade of the D'Mello House, 2021

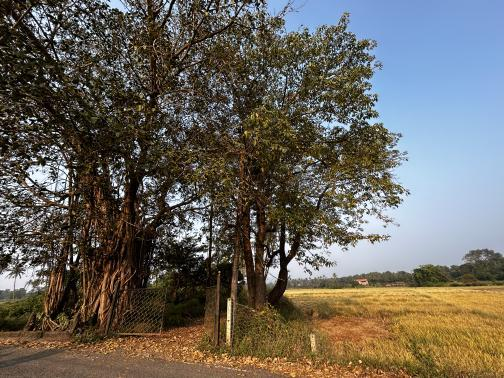
Main gate of Igorchem Bandh

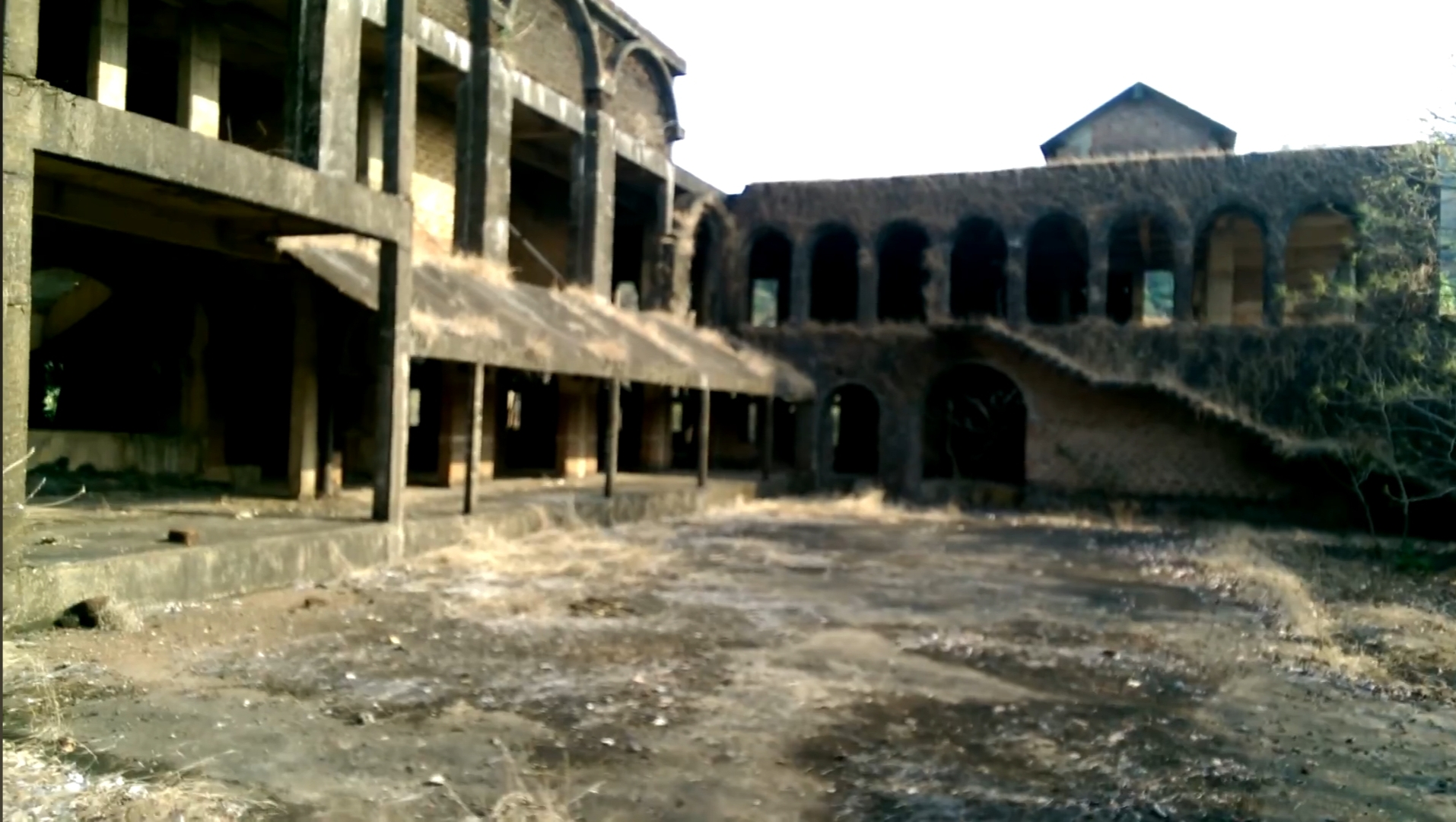
The premises of Sina Hotel, 2015

- D'Mello House: Mansion built during the Portuguese rule in Goa. According to the village folklore, it is haunted by the souls of the D'Mello brothers and their family.
- Igorchem Bandh: A mud road situated behind the Our Lady of Snows Church in Raia, known for its midday hauntings.
- Baytakhol: Stretch of road known for a high number of motor accidents. According to local folklore, the motorists have reported seeing the ghost of a young woman screaming.
- Sina Hotel: Abandoned hotel situated in Agonda that is claimed to be haunted by the ghost of one of the owners.
- Jakni Bandh: A temporary bridge connecting the village of Dramapur and the town of Navelim. According to a local legend, people hear cries of children during specific times of the year after sunset.
- Rodrigues Home: A mansion that is located in Verna. It has gained attention due to several reports of paranormal incidents.
- Three Kings Chapel: A sixteenth-century chapel from the Portuguese era, known for local folklore surrounding the murders of three kings.

== Gujarat ==
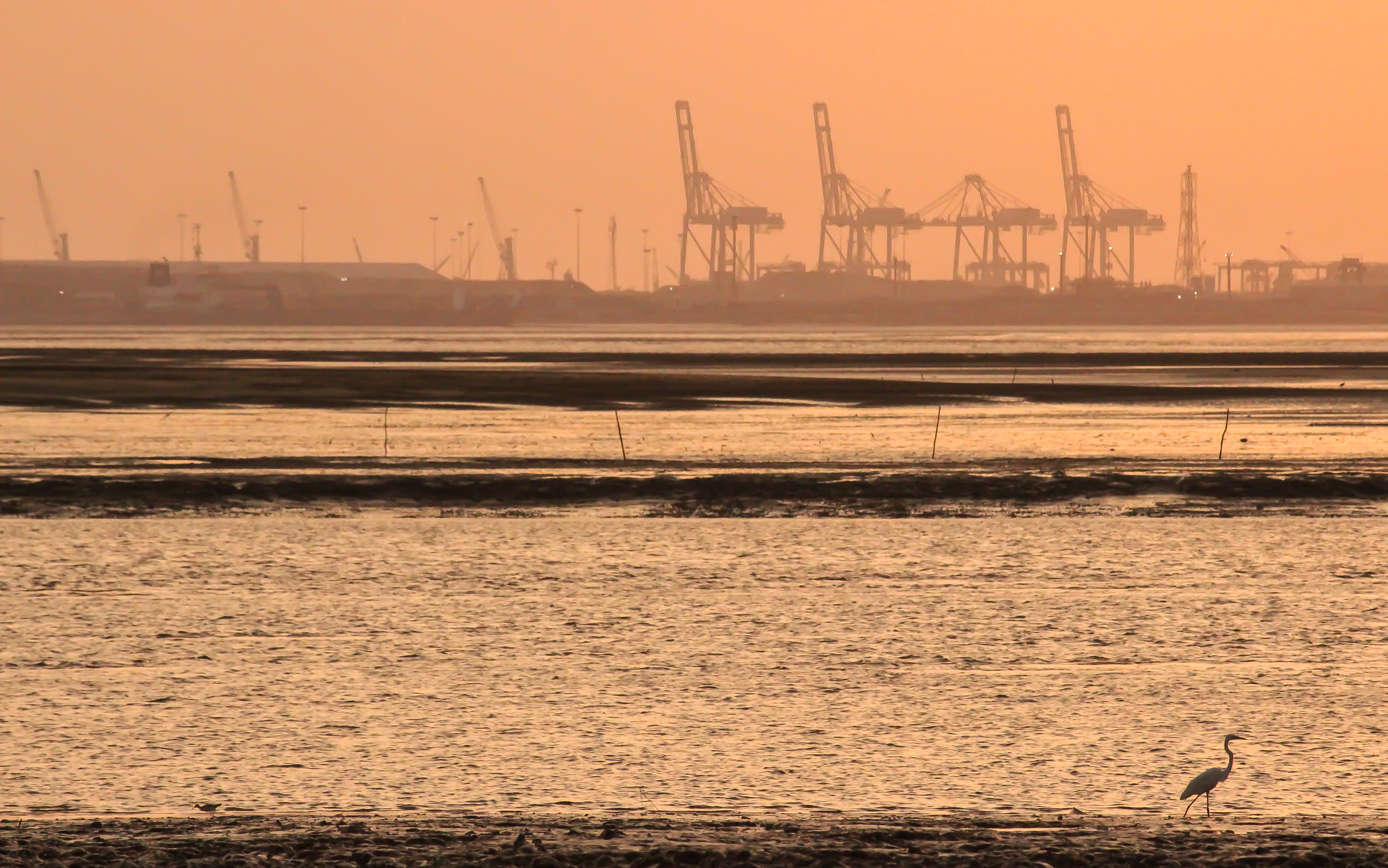
Dumas Beach as seen from Surat Bus Station

- Dumas Beach, Surat: Despite being a popular beach located about 20 km from Surat, it is believed to be haunted due to the reports of several locals and tourists vanishing from there.

== Maharashtra ==
- Grand Paradi Towers, Mumbai: Regarded to be the most famous haunted building in Mumbai as it is the site of several suicides and deaths.
- Mukesh Mills, Mumbai: The building was once a factory but a fire engulfed the building to ruins. The abandoned factory is a hotspot for shooting movies. However, the cast and crew have experienced paranormal events.
- Shaniwar Wada, Pune: A fortification built in 1732 which served as the seat of the Peshwas of the Maratha Empire until 1818 when they lost to the East India Company in the Third Anglo-Maratha War. The fort is said to be haunted by the ghost of the fifth Peshwa Narayanrao, who was murdered in 1773 by guards acting on orders of his uncle Raghunathrao and aunt Anandibai.
- Taj Mahal Palace Hotel, Mumbai: A heritage five-star luxury hotel located in the Colaba region, it was the main target of the 2008 Mumbai attacks. But believers claim the hotel, specifically the Old Wing, is haunted by the ghost of the English engineer W. A. Chambers. Legends say that he took his life by jumping off the fifth floor out of frustration once he knew that the hotel's construction was not entirely according to his plans.
- Ayesha Villa, Pune: This is an old villa in Khandala. It is rumored to be haunted by spirits of the three individuals who were killed brutally in the villa. 17 year old Ayesha and her parents were tortured and killed by miscreants.

== Rajasthan ==
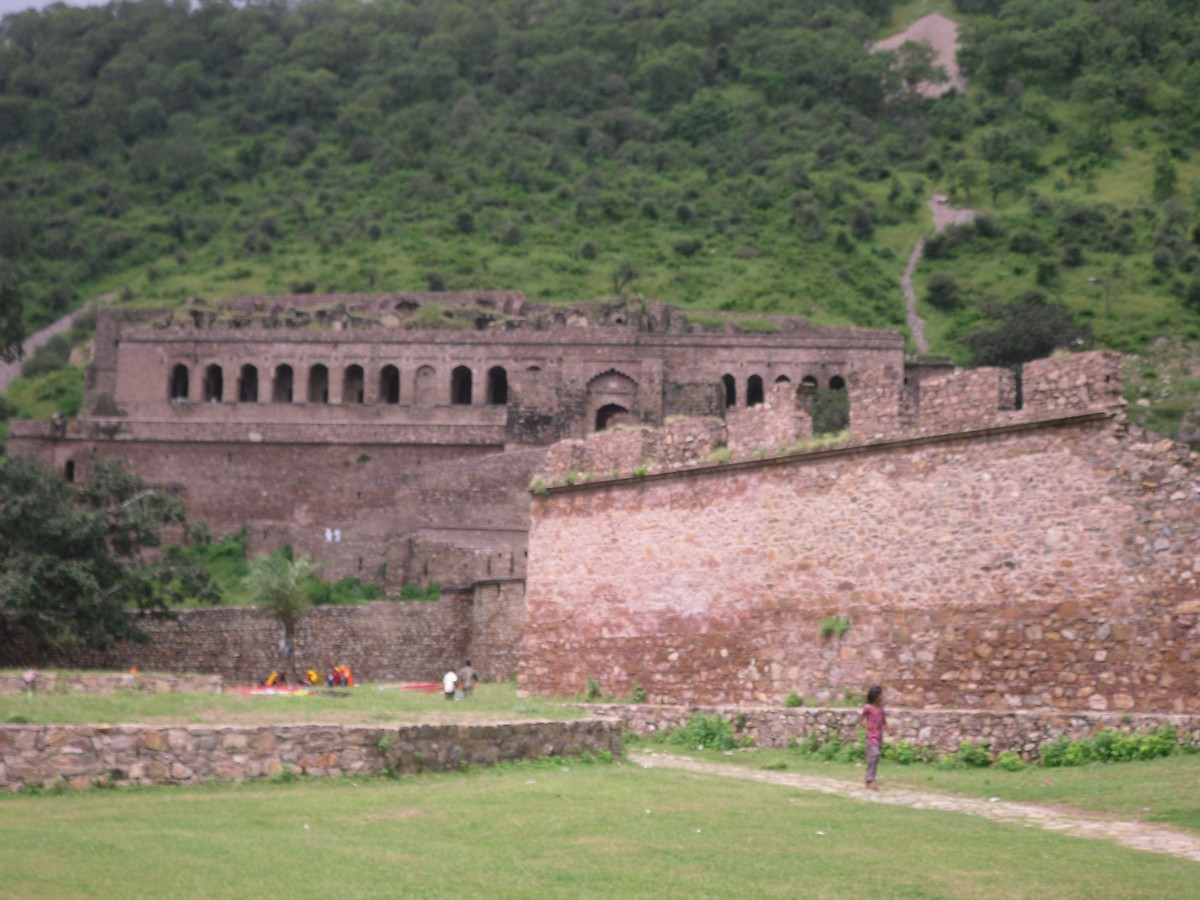
Bhangarh Fort

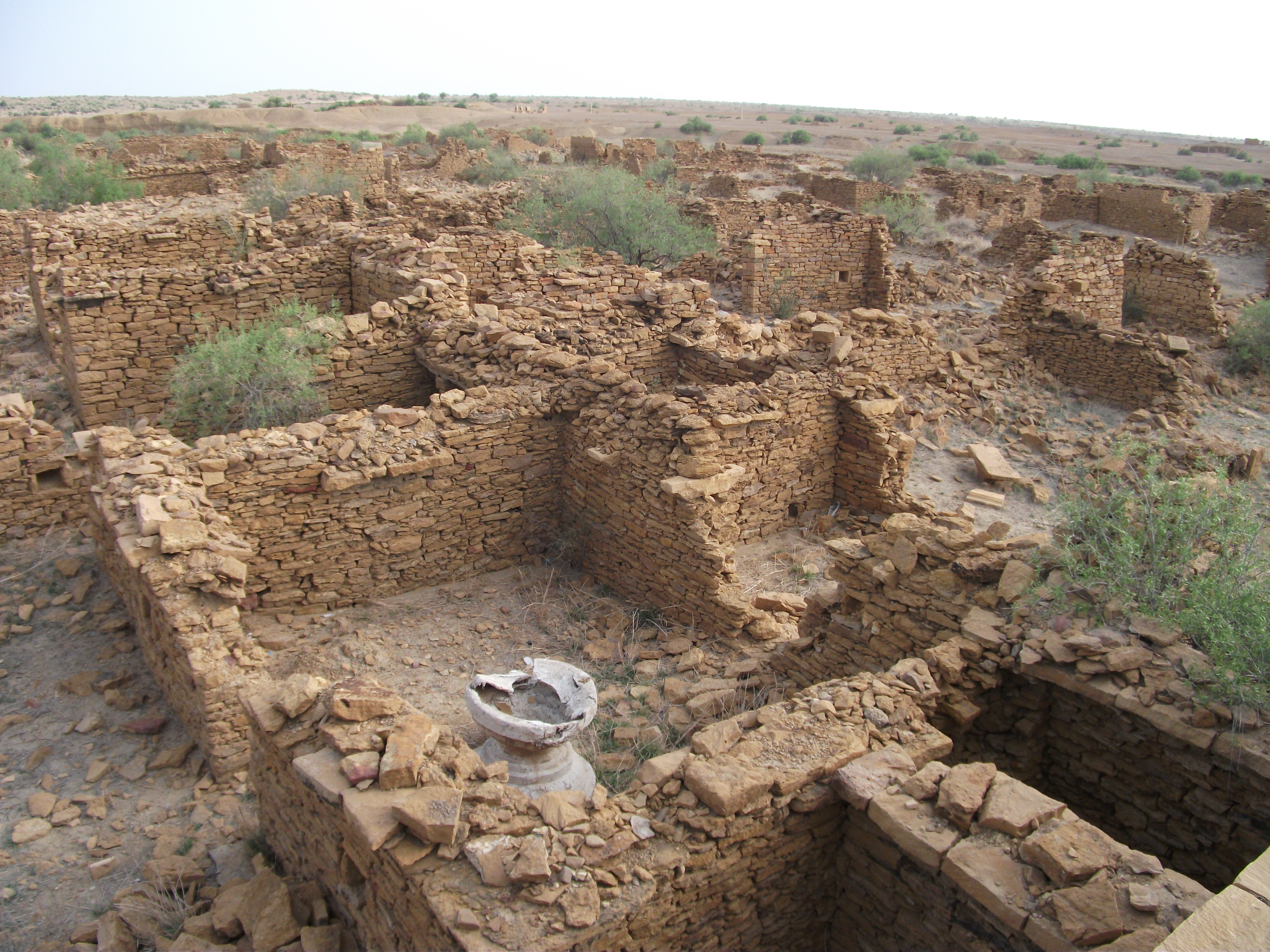
Ruins of Kuldhara

- Bhangarh Fort, Bhangarh: The site was purportedly brought to ruin as a consequence of the curse of Baba Balanath. Another legend attributes it to the curse of the sorcerer Singhiya. Entering the site before sunrise and after sunset is not allowed.
- Brijraj Bhawan Palace Hotel, Kota: A former royal residence, it is considered to be one of the most beautiful heritage hotels in the state. It is reportedly haunted by the ghost of British officer Major Burton, who resided in the palace with his family for 13 years before being killed by Indian sepoys during the Indian Rebellion of 1857.
- Kuldhara: An abandoned site in Jaisalmer district that was once a prosperous village inhabited by Paliwal Brahmins from the 13th to early 19th centuries. Local legends hold that the Paliwals cursed the village with a haunting to frighten away anyone from occupying it. The 2010 film Kaalo is loosely based on this place. The local residents around the area do not believe in the legends, but propagate them for tourism. The Indian Paranormal Society's Gaurav Tiwari believes the village is haunted.

== Telangana ==
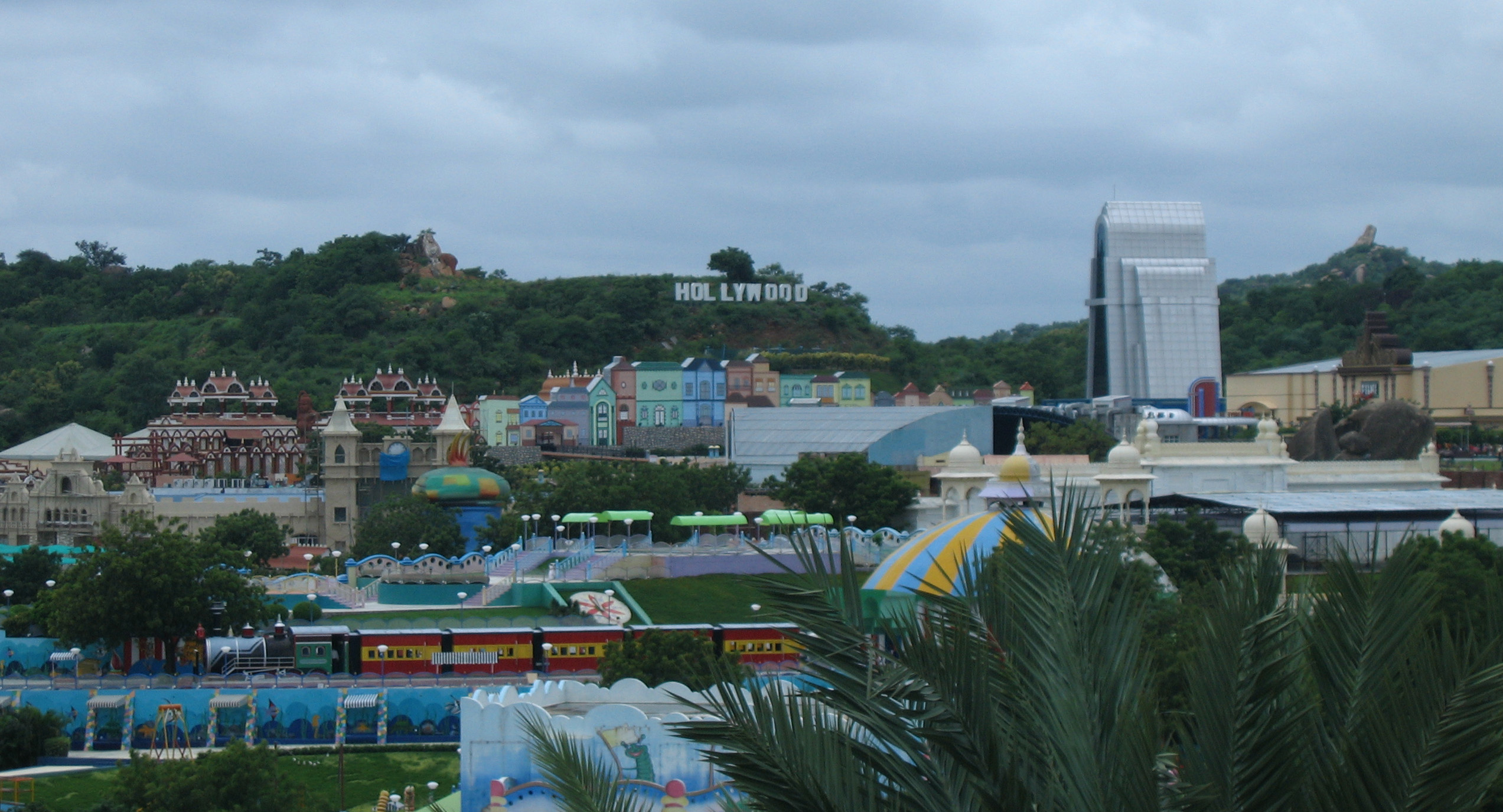
Ramoji Film City in 2007

- Golconda, Hyderabad: A citadel and fort that served as the capital of the medieval sultanate of the Qutb Shahi dynasty (circa 1518–1687). It is reportedly haunted by ghosts of soldiers as well as the specter of a dancer named Taramati, who was one of the most famous courtesans of said dynasty. The sound of her ghunghroo can be heard sometimes.
- Ramoji Film City, Hyderabad: According to legend, ghosts haunt the location because the site was a war ground of the Nizams and before that a burial ground for robbers.

== Uttarakhand ==
- Mussoorie: According to local legends, a screaming witch walks its mountains.
- Strawberry Lodge, Nainital: Dinesh Chaudhary, the owner of the house admitted there being something wrong with his apartment. Neighbours also hear strange voices coming from the empty apartment between two and four in the night. Four people reportedly died under mysterious circumstances in the apartment.

== West Bengal ==
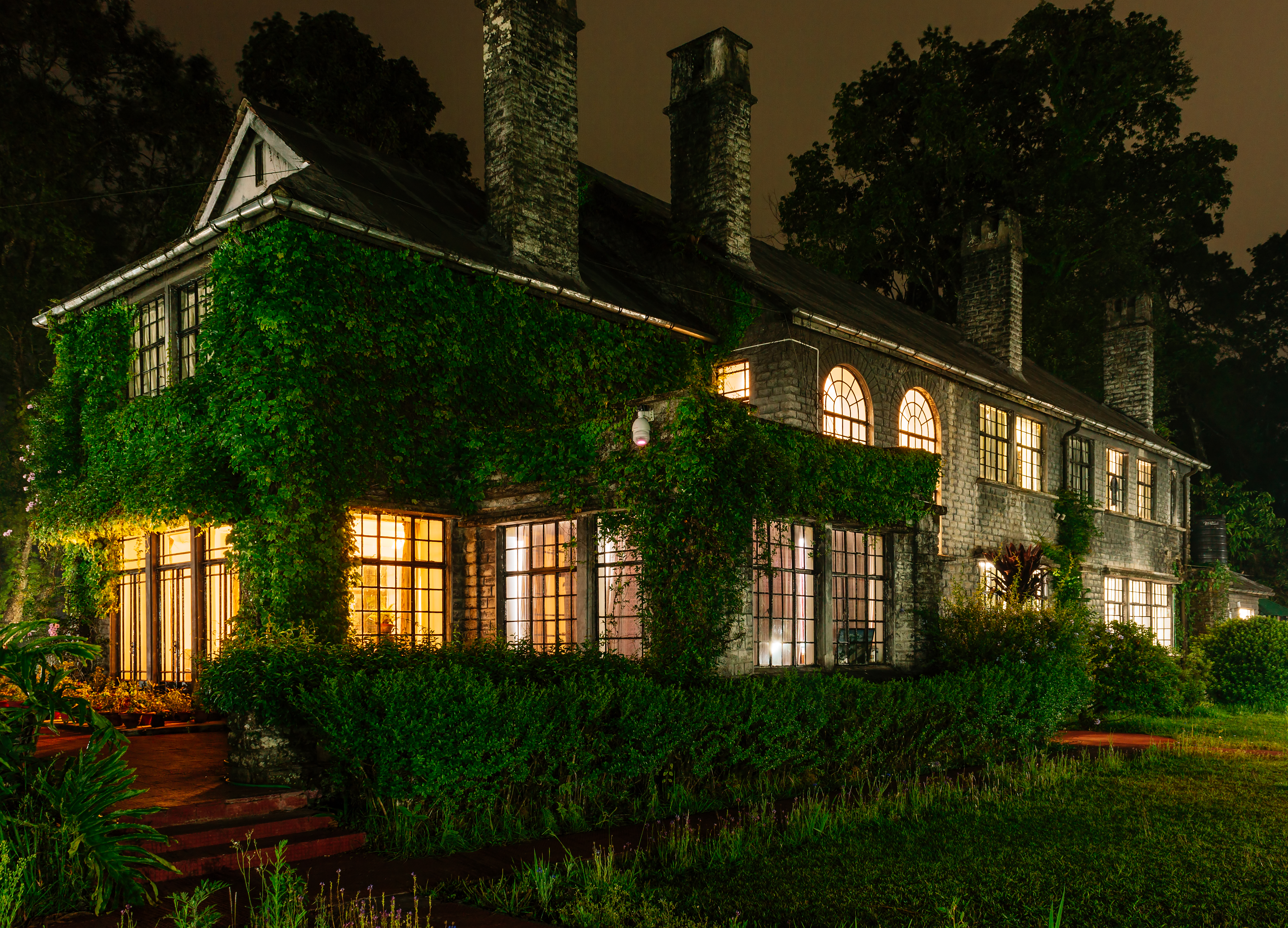
Morgan House, Kalimpong

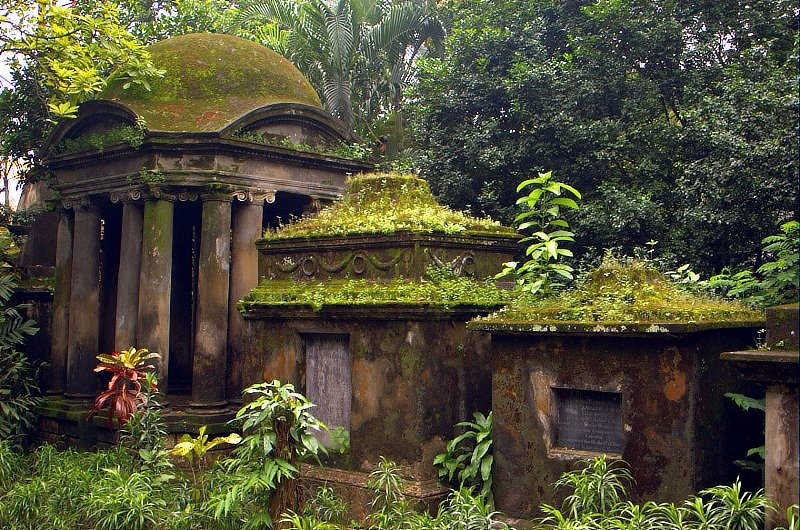
South Park Street Cemetery, Kolkata

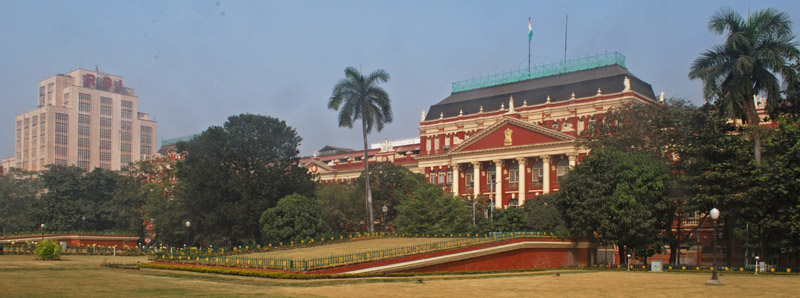
Writer's Building, Kolkata

- Dow Hill, Kurseong: Believed to be one of the most haunted places in the state, especially the corridors of Victoria Boys' School and the surrounding woods. A number of murders have taken place in the forest.
- Ghats on the Ganges under Howrah Bridge, Kolkata: The site of several deaths (either due to suicide or drowning accidents), believers speculate that many spirits wander this area.
- Hastings House, Kolkata: This is one of the oldest buildings in the Alipore region. It was constructed by Governor-General Warren Hastings, and later it became the Governor's residence. Now, the University of Calcutta runs a women's college here. Many students have reported seeing ghosts inside the building and on the grounds.
- Morgan House, Kalimpong: A colonial era mansion built in the typical British architectural style of a Victorian rectory in the early 1930s, it is considered to be one of the most haunted locations in India. The building was built to commemorate the wedding of an indigo plantation owner with a jute baron by the name of George Morgan. The property was used as a summer retreat and elaborate parties were hosted. It was later passed into the hands of trustees after Mr. and Mrs. Morgan died without heir. Several sightings of Lady Morgan have been reported.
- Dub Pukur, Haldia: Now a pond surrounded by modern buildings, it still instills fear amongst the local people. It is said that in early 18th century, the midwife of the Royals of Mahishadal Rajbari was accused of witchcraft and devouring children. She was tied up and taken deep into the forests on the banks of the Haldi River, where she was forcefully drowned in the pond. Since then, every 25 years on the night of Bhoot Chaturdashi (the 14th day of Krishna Paksha), reports of a blood-curdling scream from the pond are heard, and a person goes missing, whose body is later found floating in the pond on the morning of Diwali. The muddy pond is situated in Haldia Township.
- Nimtala Crematorium, Kolkata: It is one of the oldest crematorium ghats in central Kolkata, which is also said to be haunted.
- Rabindra Sarobar metro station, Kolkata: It is a busy station of the Kolkata Metro. It is claimed to be haunted by the spirits of people who have committed suicide there.
- South Park Street Cemetery, Kolkata: It is one of the oldest cemeteries in Park Street. Constructed in 1767, it houses the graves of British soldiers and is claimed to be haunted by the same.
- Writers' Building, Kolkata: Various stories and legends claim that Writers' Building near the B.B.D. Bagh that serves as the secretariat of the Government of West Bengal, is haunted by spirits of the dead.
- Begunkodar Railway Station: This abandoned railway station was closed for 40 years due to being haunted. It is haunted by the ghost of a lady who committed suicide and now none of the trains halt here at night.

== Kerala ==
- 25 GB Bungalow Bonacaud, Trivandrum: A tourist destination for adventure seekers in the day and one of the most reportedly haunted places in Kerala by night. Once owned by a British landlord and his wife, the bungalow sits atop a hill that has a 360° view of the surrounding estate and tea plantation. It is said that the landlord's children who died from unknown diseases haunt the now abandoned bungalow. People claimed to hear voices speaking English with British accents in and around the bungalow and see lights glowing despite the lack of any electrical connections in the bungalow. Other paranormal activities reported are a shadowy figure of child roaming around the bungalow and sounds of glass breaking.
- Lakkidi Gateway, Wayanad: It is the shortest route to cross the Thamarassery pass. However, the discovery of this route led to it becoming one of the scariest places in Kerala. It is said that in the British tried to navigate through Lakkidi when travelling from Kozhikode to Wayanad and failed multiple times. The legend is that a British professional took help from a local individual named Karinthandan to discover a route through Lakkidi and took the credit for finding the way himself, killing Karinthandan to hide the truth. Since then, many passers-by claim to have seen the spirit of Karinthandan. A religious cleric was called to perform an exorcism by binding his soul to a tree. Incredibly, a chain has developed around the tree which people accept to be a sign that the spirit that has not left. Trespassers have heard terrifying screeches and screams around evening time.
- Kariavattom, Thiruvananthapuram: Home to Technopark, the largest IT park in Kerala. People have experienced paranormal activities at several locations inside.

== See also ==
- List of reportedly haunted locations
