= Betora =

Village in Goa, India

Coordinates: 15°23′N 74°03′E

Betora or Bethora is a village in the Ponda taluka (sub-district) of Goa. It is part of the Betora-Nirancal village panchayat (or village council) and is surrounded by Khandepar (or Candepar) and Kurti (or Curti) villages. This area is a predominantly agricultural area of Goa.

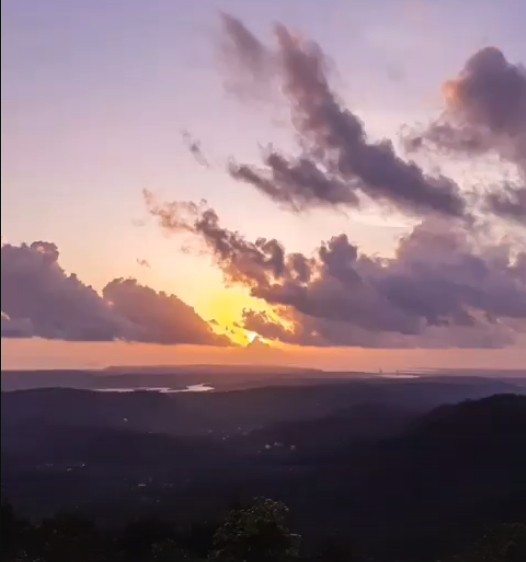
View from Siddhanath Hill in Bethora

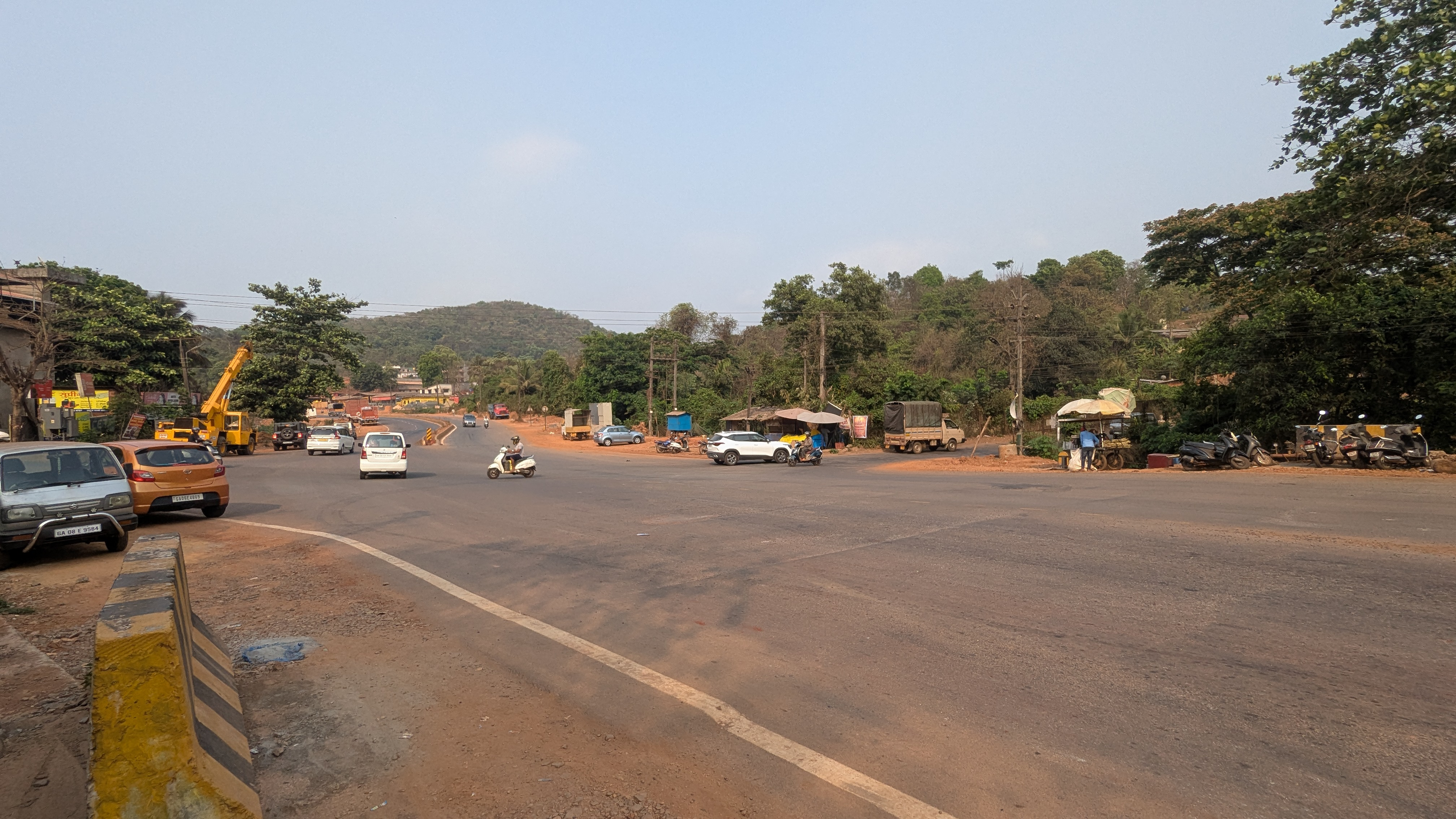
Bethora junction

== Area, population ==
According to the official 2011 Census, Betora in Ponda taluka has an area of 1,414.29 hectares, a total of 1,405 households, a population of 6,133 (comprising 3,240 males and 2,893 females) with an under-six population of 821 (comprising 412 boys and 409 girls).

Betora's location code number in the Census of India is 626859.

== Location ==
Betora lies on the outskirts of Ponda town. In its vicinity are Codar, Curdi, Candepar or Khandepar and Sidhanath Hill. It is located about 5 km from Ponda town and 35 km from Panjim or Panaji.

== Industrial estate ==
The Bethora Industrial Estate is run by the Goa Industrial Development Corporation (GIDC). This centre has some 126 plots or sheds within its area, with sizes ranges from 20 square metres to 27,222 square metres (Crompton Greaves). Among the units at this industrial estate are ones involved in the manufacture of furniture, glass designing, ceiling fans, LED bulbs, tower erection, MS grills, grills and gates, exhaust mufflers, separating agent (soap solution), acid slurry, steel furniture, plastic shutters, steel fabrication items, sheet metal components, fan components, pharma formulations, tipper bus body vehicles, bus body building, printing, nails, dies and moulds, tablets and ointments, laundry, fan assembly, stator winding assembling, solvent products, cashew nut shell liquid, fish net twines, corrugated boxes, powder coating, electroplating works, paper products, steel furniture, flour mills, ready-made garments, precast cement products, injection molded products, jerry-cans, and other products or services.

== Tribal controversy ==
In October 2016, a mob destroyed the homes of 17 Wanarmare tribal families in Nirancal village, Goa. Despite this, 40 tribal members voted in the Assembly elections, thanks to the efforts of social activists and media, who helped rehabilitate the tribe and secure voting rights for 41 eligible adults. The enfranchisement was based on Aadhar and ration cards, despite local opposition. Politicians avoided the tribals during the campaign, and only one person was arrested for the attack. The tribe, traditionally known for taming monkeys, now works in farming and labor, facing issues like low female ratios and child marriages.

== Panchayat ==
The village panchayat (council) of Bethora-Nirancal has nine members, and is classified as a "B" class panchayat.
