= Rodrigues Home =

The Rodrigues Home

General information
- Status: Occupied
- Type: Mansion
- Location: Verna, Goa, India
- Known for: Village folklore

The Rodrigues Home is a mansion that is located in Verna, in the Indian coastal state of Goa. The mansion has gained attention due to its association with numerous reported paranormal incidents. Described by The Times of India as "normal-looking," the mansion continues to be occupied by the Rodrigues family.

== Folklore ==
Hengul J Das and Shikha Gautam, affiliated with The Times of India, have documented accounts from local residents regarding a peculiar belief surrounding the Rodrigues Home. According to these reports, the doors and windows of the house are said to exhibit an ability to open and close autonomously, while the lights within intermittently flicker. Furthermore, individuals have claimed that the cutlery within the house mysteriously moves without any discernible external cause. These reported phenomena have contributed to the house's reputation as a site imbued with an eerie and unsettling aura.

As per a report published by The Free Press Journal, there have been documented instances of linens recurrently manifesting and disappearing within the household precisely at midnight, seemingly without any identifiable individual gaining entry to the premises.

Fernando Monte da Silva, affiliated with The Goan Everyday, has observed that the dwelling inhabited by the Rodrigues family stands as a testament to their fortitude. The collective sentiment within the village affirms that the incidents transpiring within the household are anything but commonplace, often evoking a sense of cinematic drama.

== In popular culture ==
In April 2021, the Rodrigues Home was described on episode 79 of the SYWK Podcast: Everything About Paranormal.

== See also ==
- List of reportedly haunted locations in India
