= Nirancal =

Village in Goa, India

Coordinates: 15°21′38″N 74°04′48″E

Nirancal is a village in the Ponda taluka (sub-district) of Goa, India.

== Area, population ==
According to the official 2011 Census, Nirancal in Ponda taluka has an area of 1989.30 hectares, a total of 406 households, a population of 1,772 (comprising 880 males and 892 females) with an under-six years population of 135 (comprising 68 boys and 67 girls).

== Location ==
Nirancal is located in the south eastern part of Ponda taluka. Nirancal is to the north of Dabal.

It lies approx 9.1 km from the sub-district (taluka) headquarters of Ponda town (via the Rajiv Kala Mandir Road and the Upper Bazaar), and approx 40.8 km away from the district North Goa headquarters of Panaji or Panjim via the NH748.

== Local jurisdiction ==
Nirancal lies under the Bethora-Nirankal gram panchayat.
