= Borim =

Borim Bori
- Village
- Location in Goa, India Borim (India)
- Coordinates: 15.3604408°N 74.000414°E
- Country: India
- State: Goa
- District: North Goa

Languages
  - Official: Konkani
- Time zone: UTC+5:30 (IST)
- PIN: 403401
- Vehicle registration: GA
- Website: goa.gov.in

Borim or Bori is a census town in Ponda taluka, North Goa district in the state of Goa, India on the banks of Zuari River. It has a land area of 1536.07 acres and has a population of 8,257. The village has a rich history dating back to the 12th century Kadamba era, when the Kamleshwar temple was built at Deulwada by the Kadamba queen, Kamaladevi. The name Bori is etymologically derived from the word Bora (Indian berry, zizyphus). It is said that the village had many Indian berry or "Bor" trees at some point. Badrigram, a Sanskrit version of the village name, also alludes to the Indian berries, known as Badri in Sanskrit.

== Places of interest ==
- Shree Navadurga temple
- Siddhnath hill
- Shree Sai Baba Devasthan
- St Francis Xavier Church
- Heritage House of Sawkars
- House of the poet Balakrishna Bhagwant Borkar a.k.a. Bakibab

== Notable individuals ==
- Poet Borkar
- Tulsidas Borkar

== Gallery ==
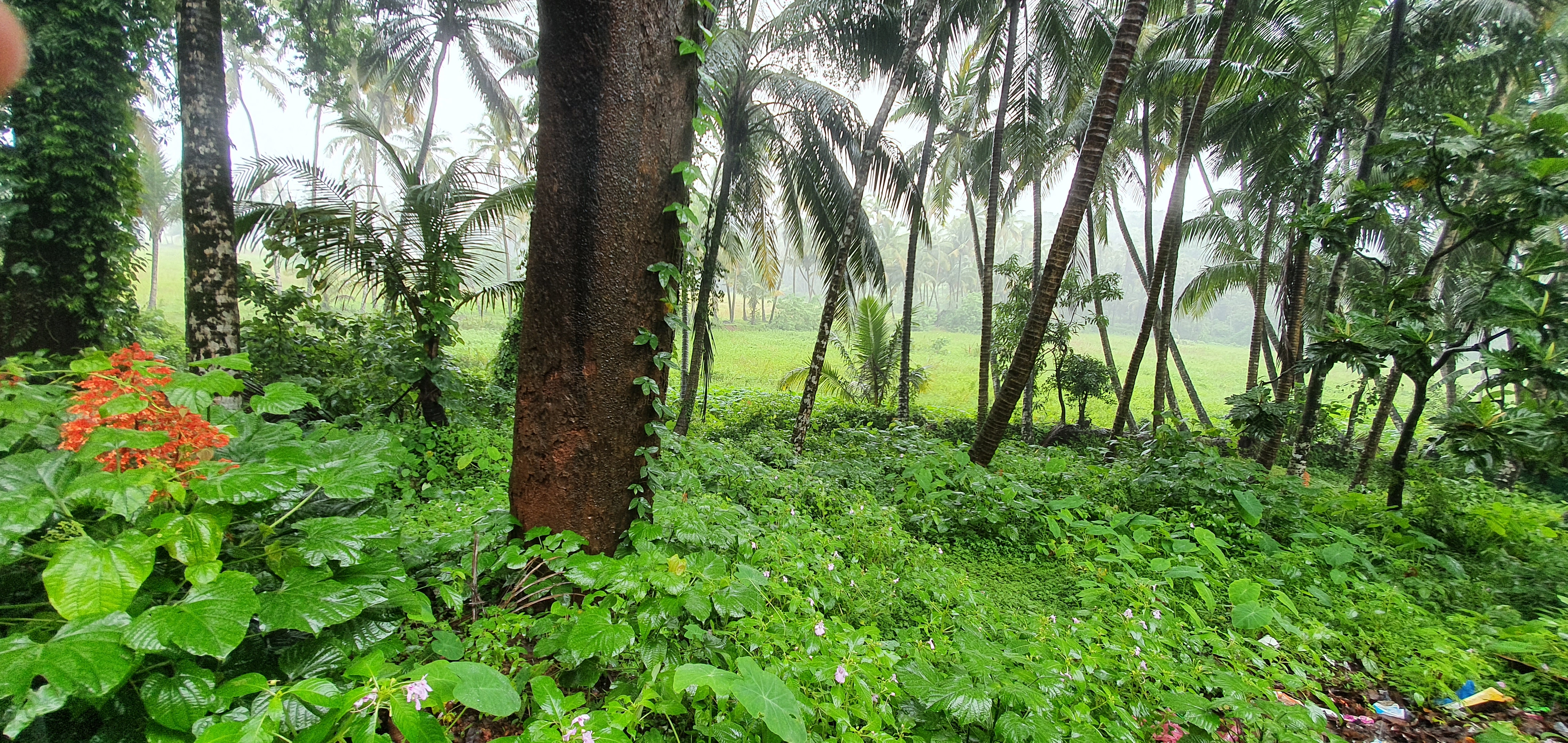
Borim Fields from NH17 road

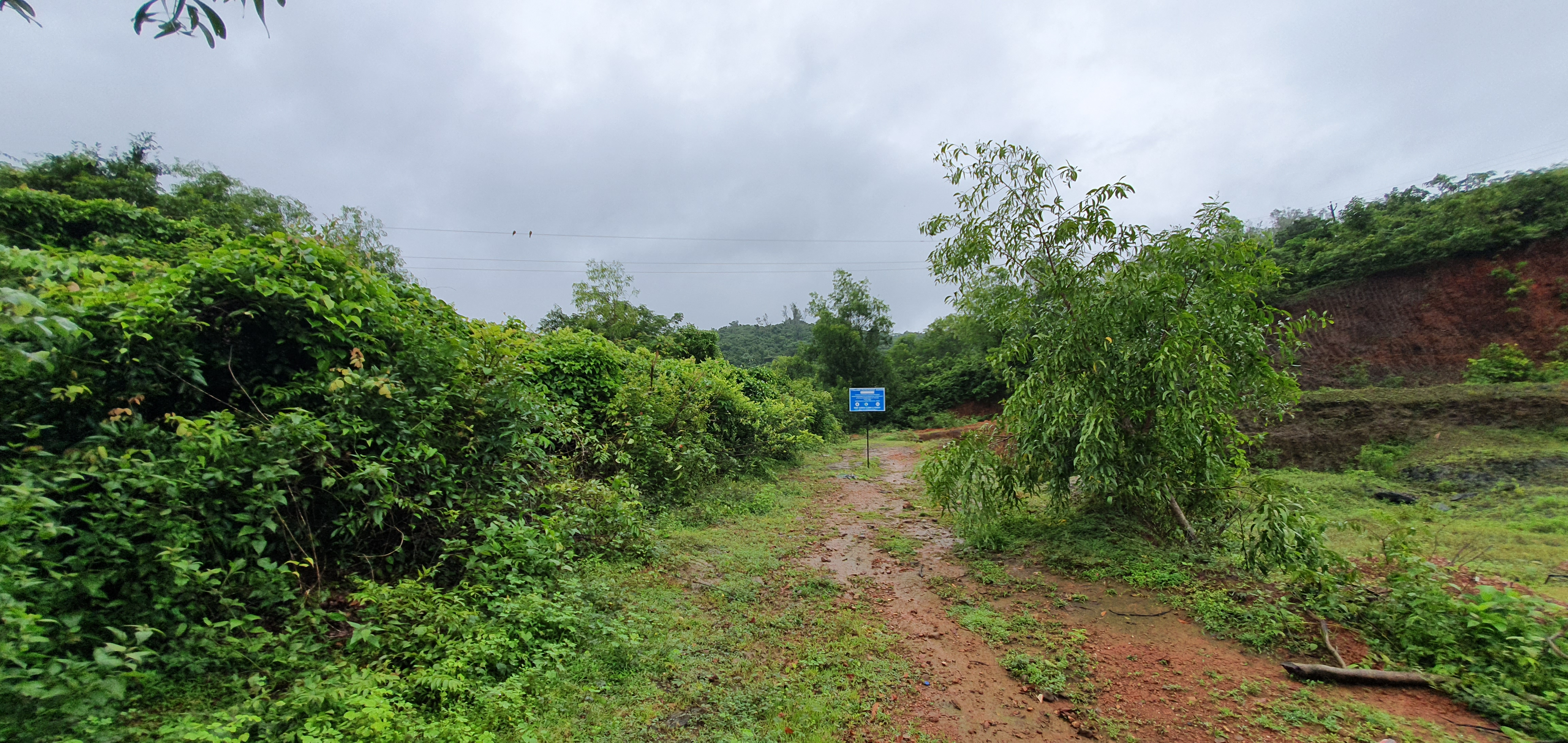
Kolmamol Mountain scene in Borim
Images from Borim, Goa, India
