= Maria de Lourdes Bravo da Costa Rodrigues =

Indian writer and historian

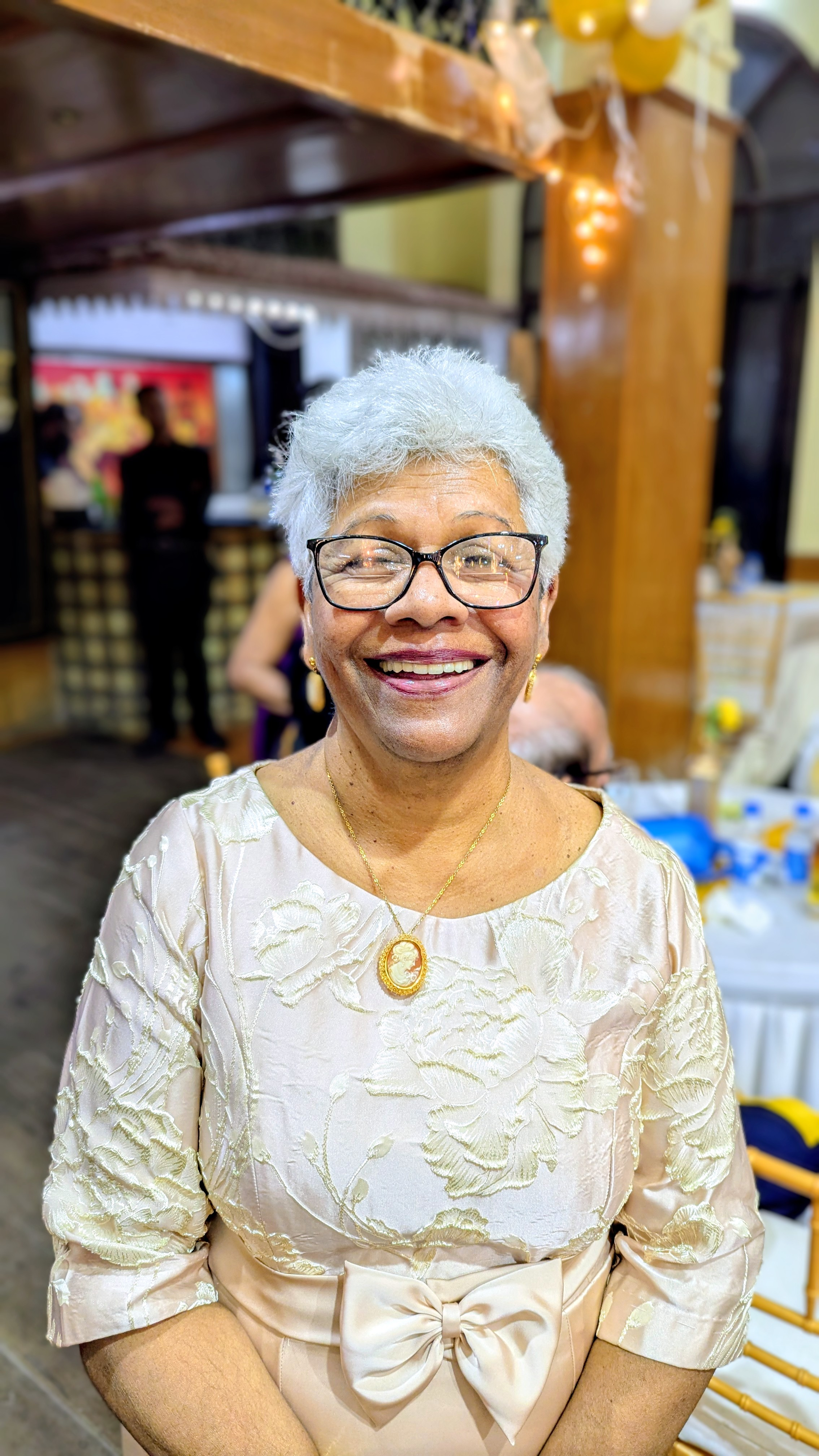
- Rodrigues in 2025
- Born: Maria de Lourdes Bravo da Costa; 1952 or 1953 (age 73–74)
- Writing career
- Subject: History of Goa
- Notable works: Feasts, Festivals and Observations of Goa

Maria de Lourdes Fátima Fernandes Bravo da Costa Rodrigues (born 1952 or 1953) is an Indian writer and historian, noted for her work on the history, culture, games and cuisine of Goa.

== Life and career ==
=== Early and personal life ===
Rodrigues was born to Maria Madalena Fernandes and Jaime Bravo da Costa, who were both nurses. She was born and raised in Panjim. She did her primary schooling in Escola Primária Massano se Amorim and was a student of the Liceu Nacional Afonso de Albuquerque. She completed her matriculation in 1969. She later completed a BSc degree in Chemistry and Geology from Dhempe College of Arts and Science.

Rodrigues has a Masters in History and Library and Information Science. She had a brother, Pedro, who died in 2024.

=== Initial career ===
Rodrigues has previously been a librarian at the Goa State Central Library. While working as a librarian she uncovered an original photo of Metropolitan Alvares Julius. She also spoke at Goa University's international conference "Goa: 1961 and Beyond."

=== Writing career ===
Rodrigues has researched Goan cuisine, documenting its roots, influences, and distinctive features. She has discussed how Goan food culture has evolved over time due to various local and colonial interactions. Her commentary also touches on how different communities within Goa have contributed to the region's unique culinary identity. In March 2023, she completed her thesis on Food History of Goa: its multifaceted aspects from 1900-1961, thus completing her PhD from Goa University. This was released as a book in 2025. The book is titled Portuguese Colonialism, Food, and Society in Goa: 1900-1961 (Bloomsbury, 2025). In an interview about the book with R. Benedito Ferrão, the author explained that the reason she wrote it is because: "Rice is the staple food of the Goan people, and any serious study of the region’s history must acknowledge its central role within the community. In my own writing and research, I’ve explored how rice shaped not just daily sustenance, but also systems of power and survival."

Rodrigues has also contributed to major publications such as The Navhind Times, OHeraldo, Goa Today and Gomantak Times.

== Works ==
- Feasts, Festivals and Observances of Goa
- Games That We Played: Traditional Goan Sports
- The Congresso Provincial da India Portuguesa and the problem of alcoholism in Goa
- Tasty Goan Morsels: Goan Food, Preparation and Ingredients and Feasts
- Portuguese Colonialism, Food, and Society in Goa 1900-1961 (2025)
