= Dilapidation =

Disrepair and abandonment of a structure

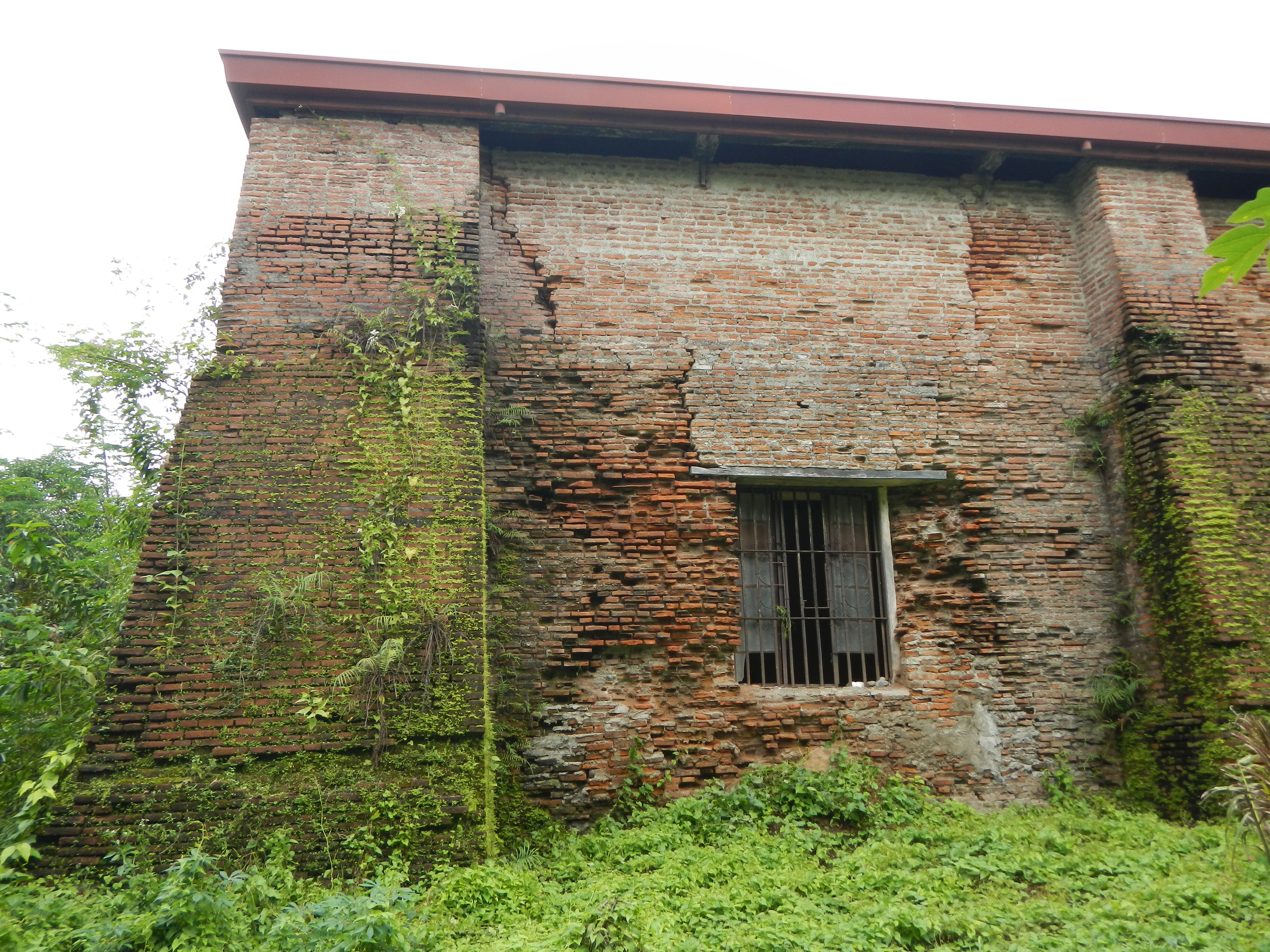
Dilapidated walls of Asingan Church, Philippines

Dilapidation is a term meaning being of poor condition and unmaintained. Dilapidation usually particularly refers to buildings and structures. The term is also used in the plural in English law for:

1. the waste committed by the incumbent of an ecclesiastical living
2. the disrepair for which holder of a leasehold estate (tenant) is usually liable when he has agreed to give up his premises in good repair.

Dilapidation is derived from the Latin for "scattering the stones" (lapides) of a building.

== Ecclesiastical law ==
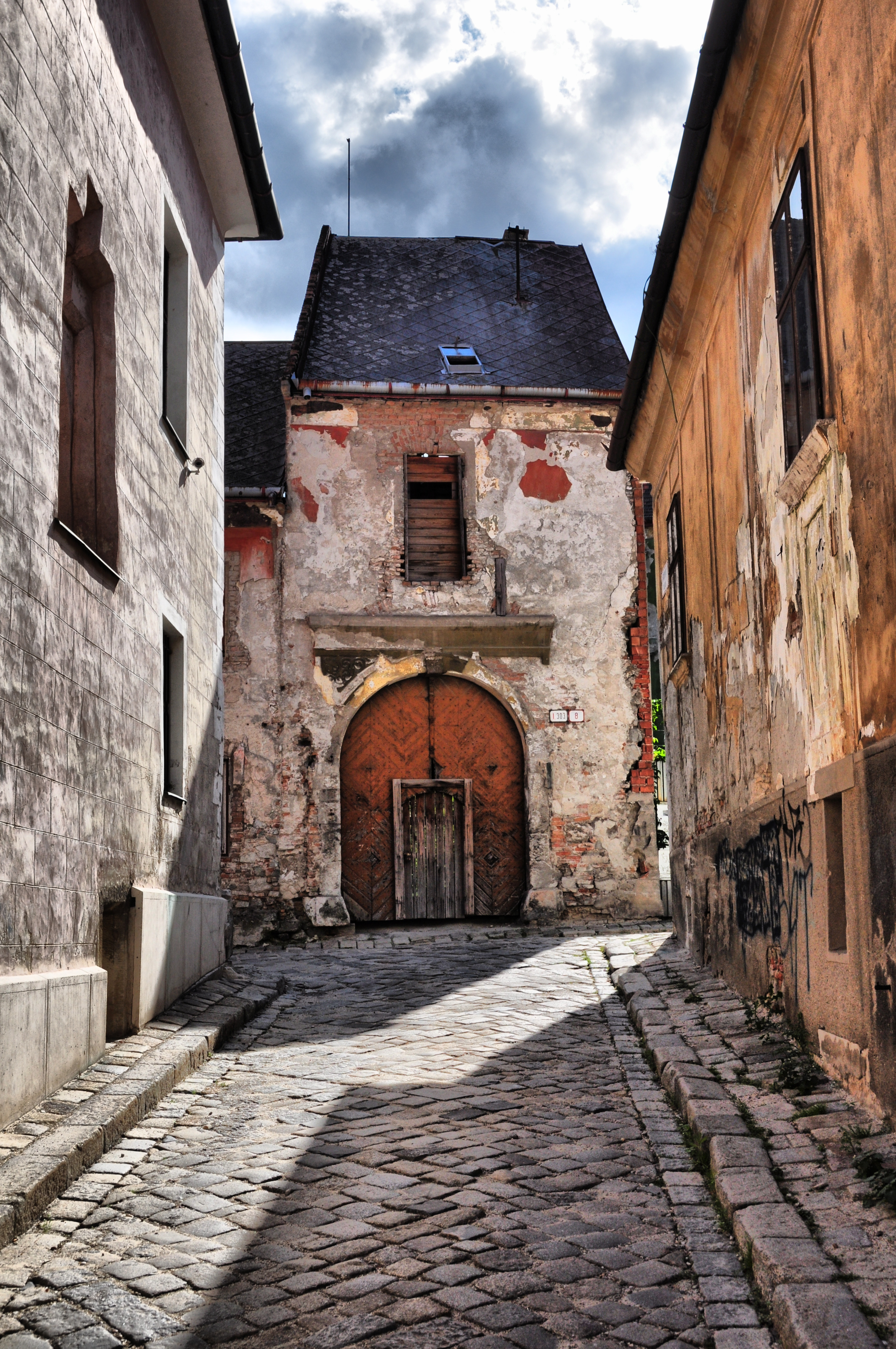
Dilapidated building in the Old Town area of Bratislava, Slovakia.

In general English law a tenant for life has no power to cut down timber, destroy buildings, etc., or to let buildings fall into disrepair. In the eye of the law an incumbent of a living is a tenant for life of his benefice, and any waste, voluntary or permissive, on his part must be made good by his administrators to his successor in office. The principles on which such dilapidations are to be ascertained, and the application of the money payable in respect thereof, depend partly on old ecclesiastical law and partly on acts of Parliament.

Questions as to ecclesiastical dilapidations usually arise in respect of the residence house and other buildings belonging to the living. Inclosures, hedges, ditches and the like are included in things of which the beneficed person has the burden and charge of reparation. In a leading case (Ross v. Adcock, 1868, L.R. 3 C.P. 657) it was said that the court was acquainted with no precedent or decision extending the liability of the executors of a deceased incumbent to any species of waste beyond dilapidation of the house, chancel or other buildings or fences of the benefice. And it has been held that the mere mismanagement or miscultivation of the ecclesiastical lands will not give rise to an action for dilapidations.

To place the law relating to dilapidations on a more satisfactory footing, the Ecclesiastical Dilapidations Act 1871 was passed. The buildings to which the act applies are defined to be such houses of residence, chancels, walls, fences and other buildings and things as the incumbent of the benefice is by law and custom bound to maintain in repair. In each diocese a surveyor is appointed by the archdeacons and rural deans subject to the approval of the bishop; and such surveyor shall by the direction of the bishop examine the buildings on the following occasions viz.

1. when the benefice is sequestrated;
2. when it is vacant;
3. at the request of the incumbent or on complaint by the archdeacon, rural dean or patron.

The surveyor specifies the works required, and gives an estimate of their probable cost. In the case of a vacant benefice, the new incumbent and the old incumbent or his representatives may lodge objections to the surveyors report on any grounds of fact or law, and the bishop, after consideration, may make an order for the repairs and their cost, for which the late incumbent or his representatives are liable. The sum so stated becomes a debt due from the late incumbent or his representatives to the new incumbent, who shall pay over the money when recovered to the governors of Queen Anne's Bounty.

The governors pay for the works on execution on receipt of a certificate from the surveyor; and the surveyor, when the works have been completed to his satisfaction, gives a certificate to that effect, the effect of which, so far as regards the incumbent, is to protect him from liability for dilapidations for the next five years. Unnecessary buildings belonging to a residence house may, by the authority of the bishop and with the consent of the patron, be removed. An amending statute of 1872 (Ecclesiastical Dilapidations Act (1871) Amendment) relates chiefly to advances by the governors of Queen Anne's Bounty for the purposes of the act.

== Commercial property ==
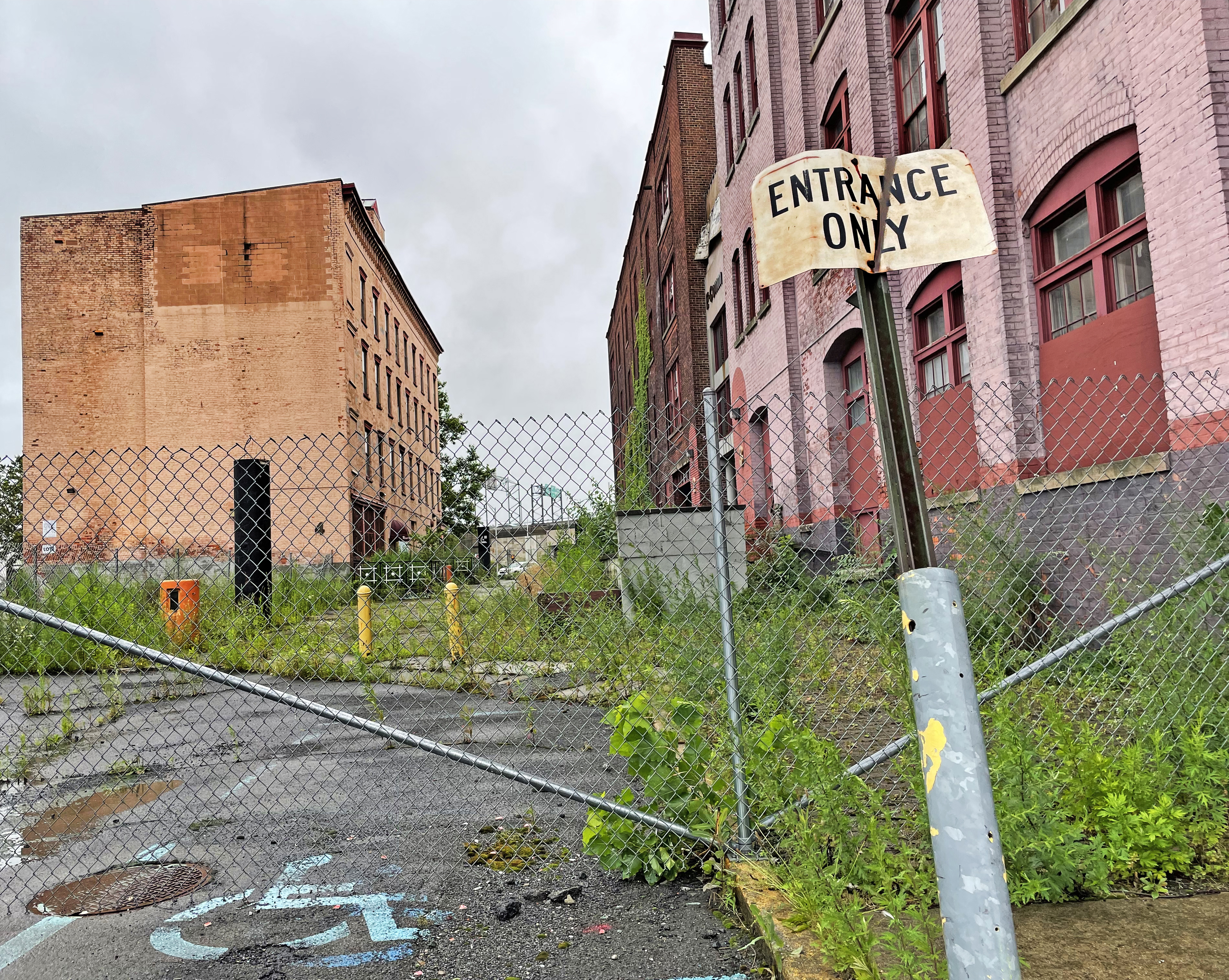
Dilapidated abandoned buildings in Albany, New York

In the commercial property world, 'dilapidations' refers to breaches of lease covenants relating to the condition of a property, and the process of remedying those breaches.

Tenants enter commercial leases agreeing to keep premises in repair; if they do not, the law of dilapidations applies. Landlords have the ability to serve a schedule of dilapidations on a tenant either during or more commonly at the end of the lease, itemising the breaches of covenant. Remedies for the landlord will be for the tenant to undertake the specified works or for them to seek to recover from the tenant the cost of making good the disrepair. Dilapidations occur primarily at the end of a lease, and often disputes arise between landlords and tenants as to their extent, and in order to reach a conclusion this inevitably leads to an appraisal of past case law which stems over 100 years. In an economic downturn dilapidations are also commonplace either during a lease term or if the tenant exercises a break clause. Most dilapidations are settled by negotiation, but other methods exist in demonstrating loss suffered by a landlord such as a diminution valuation. Landlords and tenants will normally be advised by a specialist surveyor or property consultant.

Formal guidance on dilapidations exists such as the PLA protocol which was currently adopted under the Civil Procedure Rules in 2012. The Royal Institution of Chartered Surveyors produces a guidance note on dealing with dilapidations claims and this is currently in its sixth edition. The Financial Reporting Council's accounting standard FRS12 requires occupiers to budget for dilapidations in their accounts leading to more tenants seeking advice on dilapidations before the end of their leases.
