= Curti, Goa =

Curti
- Census town
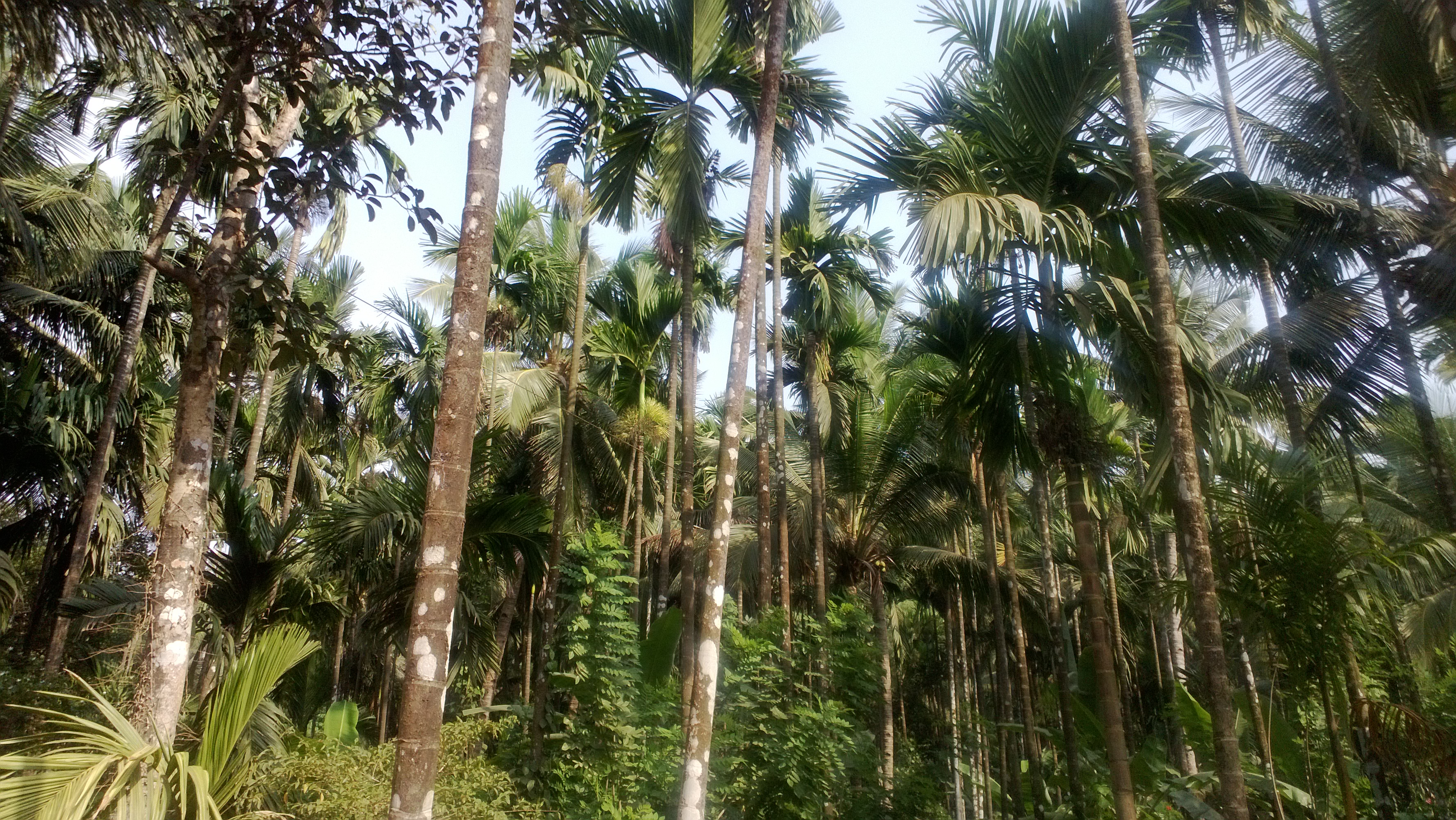
- Spice garden in Curti

- Location in Goa, India Curti (India)
- Coordinates: 15.42°N 74.02°E
- Country: India
- State: Goa
- District: North Goa
- Elevation: 30 m (98 ft)

Population (2001)
  - Total: 13,070

Languages
  - Official: Konkani
- Time zone: UTC+5:30 (IST)
- Vehicle registration: GA
- Website: goa.gov.in

Curti is a census town in North Goa district in Goa, India.

== Geography ==
Curti is located at . It has an average elevation of 30 metres (98 feet).

== Demographics ==
As of 2001 India census, Curti had a population of 13,070. Males constitute 53% of the population and females 47%. Curti has an average literacy rate of 71%, higher than the national average of 59.5%: male literacy is 75% and, female literacy is 67%. In Curti, 13% of the population is under 6 years of age.
