= Phondushastri Karande =

Reformist writer (1864–1946)

- Born: Ramchandra Vaman Karande; 1864 Marcel, Portuguese Goa
- Died: 1946 (aged 81–82) Marcel, Portuguese Goa

Ramchandra Vaman "Phondushastri" Karande (1864–1946) was a reformist writer and a litterateur.

== Early life ==
Ramchandra Vaman Karande was born in 1864 in Marcel, Portuguese Goa. He was introduced to Vedic studies and medicine through his family tradition and eventually became an expert in these fields. He conducted deep studies into astrology, the technical aspects of religious rituals, and various scriptures (Dharmashastras). Since he was an expert in Sanskrit, literature, rituals, Ayurveda, and astrology, he earned the title of Shastri.

== Early work ==
Most of Karande's writing was published in periodicals. Around 1894, he began writing on social issues for the Panjim-based weekly magazine Hitachintak. He wrote under the pen name Dwiref. He chose this name because his own name, Ramchandra, contains two 'R's (in Devanagari script, the letter 'Ra' is sometimes referred to as 'Reph'). Since the word Dwiref literally means a bumblebee (which has two 'R's in its Sanskrit name), he titled his collection of writings Gunjarav (The Humming of a Bee). He wrote under this name for forty years.

== Satsang ==
While he contributed to many important Goan periodicals, his most significant literary contribution was through the magazine Satsang. In 1901, when Shrinivas Lakhu Bhandare established a printing press in Cumbarjua, Karande conceptualized starting a periodical from there. With support from Bhandare, Dada Vaidya and Ramchandra Waman Naik, Satsang was launched under Karande's editorship, where he wrote extensively. Karande's work was then compared to that of Vishnushastri Krushnashastri Chiplunkar. Satsang was published in Marathi language and focused on the lives of different Gaud Saraswat Brahmins.

== Social reform and ideology ==
Later, in Satsang, he began writing poetry under the pseudonym Toch Mee (It's me), though his prose was considered far superior to his poetry. He is often recognized as the first "stylist" writer in Marathi literature.

In 1908, Karande spoke at a public meeting at Mhamai Kamat House in Panaji. The result of this meeting was the founding of the Mushtifund Saunstha in Panaji for the education of the underprivileged.

In 1928, Karande established the Gomantak Sahitya Seva Mandal, for inclusion of Konkani words, phrases and proverbs in the Maharashtra–Shabdakosh.

Although he covered a wide range of subjects, his primary focus was the spread of education, a topic he wrote about with great passion. His writings often reflected his grief over India's lack of independence. His style was characterized by irony and satire, used to critique social ills, and subtle humour, making his reformist ideas more accessible.

Despite having a traditional education, he was a staunch reformist. He was a vocal advocate for women's education and held progressive views against the caste system, child marriage, and the prohibition of foreign travel (Paradeshgaman).

His only published book is titled Kaivalyapur Mathacha Itihas (History of the Kaivalyapur Monastery).

== Death ==
Karande died in 1946 in Marcel.
