= Electron therapy =

- Specialty: Radiation oncology
- ICD-9: 92.25

Electron therapy or electron beam therapy (EBT) is a kind of external beam radiotherapy where accelerated electrons from a particle accelerator are directed to a tumor site for medical treatment of cancer.

== Equipment ==
Electron beam therapy is performed using a medical linear accelerator. The same device can also be used to produce high energy photon beams. When electrons are required, the X-ray target is retracted out of the beam and the electron beam is collimated with a piece of apparatus known as an applicator or an additional collimating insert, constructed from a low melting point alloy.

== Properties ==
Note the rapid falloff for 4 MeV electron compared to X rays and Protons.

Electron beams have a finite range, after which dose falls off rapidly. Therefore, they spare deeper healthy tissue. The depth of the treatment is selected by the appropriate energy. Unlike photon beams there is no surface sparing effect, so electron therapy is used when the target extends to the patient's skin.

== Indications ==
Electron beam therapy is used in the treatment of superficial tumors like cancer of skin regions, or total skin (e.g. mycosis fungoides), diseases of the limbs (e.g. melanoma and lymphoma), nodal irradiation, and it may also be used to boost the radiation dose to the surgical bed after mastectomy or lumpectomy. For deeper regions intraoperative electron radiation therapy might be applied.

== See also ==
- Intraoperative electron radiation therapy (IOERT)
- External beam radiotherapy (EBRT)
- Proton therapy
