= Bystander effect (radiobiology) =

The radiation-induced bystander effect (bystander effect) is the phenomenon in which unirradiated cells exhibit irradiated effects as a result of signals received from nearby irradiated cells. In November 1992, Hatsumi Nagasawa and John B. Little first reported this radiobiological phenomenon.

== Effect ==
There is evidence that targeted cytoplasmic irradiation results in mutation in the nucleus of the hit cells. Cells that are not directly hit by an alpha particle, but are in the vicinity of one that is hit, also contribute to the genotoxic response of the cell population. Similarly, when cells are irradiated, and the medium is transferred to unirradiated cells, these unirradiated cells show bystander responses when assayed for clonogenic survival and oncogenic transformation. This is also attributed to the bystander effect.

== Demonstration ==
The demonstration of a bystander effect in 3D human tissues and, more recently, in whole organisms have clear implication of the potential relevance of the non-targeted response to human health.

== Consequences ==
This effect may also contribute to the final biological consequences of exposure to low doses of radiation. However, there is currently insufficient evidence to suggest that the bystander effect promotes carcinogenesis in humans at low doses.

== Notes ==
Note that the bystander effect is not the same as the abscopal effect. The abscopal effect is a phenomenon where the response to radiation is seen in an organ/site distant to the irradiated organ/area, that is, the responding cells are not juxtaposed with the irradiated cells. T-cells and dendritic cells have been implicated to be part of the mechanism.

In suicide gene therapy, the "bystander effect" is the ability of the transfected cells to transfer death signals to neighboring tumor cells.
