= Mhamai Kamat House =

Heritage house in Goa, India

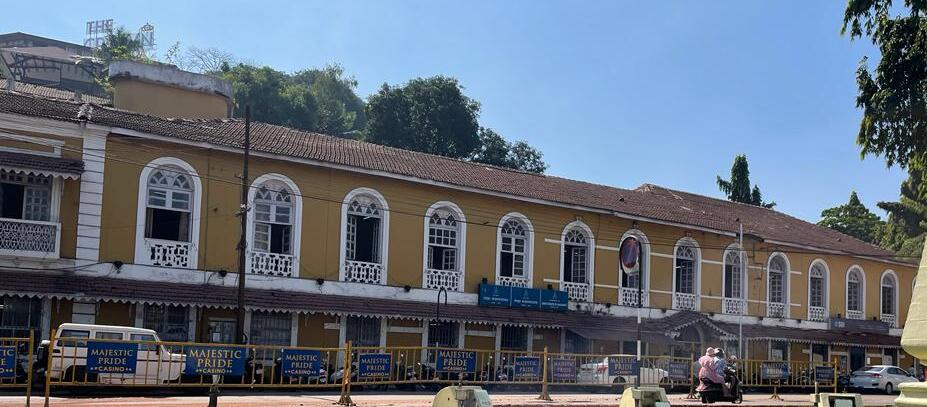
- Front of the Mhamai Kamat House as seen from near the Abbé Faria statue

General information
- Location: Panjim, Goa, India
- Coordinates: 15°30′02″N 73°49′46″E
- Opened: 1698

Technical details
- Floor count: 2

The Mhamai Kamat House is a historic 18th-century residence and former bead factory located in Panaji, Goa. Housing the Mhamai Kamat family, the house has served as a significant landmark of Goan heritage, commerce, and culture.

== History ==
=== Mhamai Kamat family ===
According to legend, a Brahmin ascetic migrated from his original home in the Kotta sector of Chandrapur to a cavern in Kamtimvaddo. The community eventually became farmers and managers of sluice gates and dykes. During the period of forced conversions to Christianity, some members of the commune fled south, while others, including the Mhamai Kamats, remained.

In the 18th century, Subba Hari Kamat (who adopted the surname Camotim under Portuguese rule) established the family home in an old bead factory. He expanded the structure during the second quarter of the 1700s, naming it "Mhamai" after the family deity, Shree Mahamayi, from Guirdolim, Salcete taluka.

Since agriculture was not a viable option in Panjim city, Subba Hari Kamat and his sons worked as official brokers at the Goa Customs House, supplying to the Viceroy's palace in the late 18th and early 19th centuries. The family thus maintained a strong relationship with the Portuguese administration. Later generations supervised government institutions such as the Éscola Priméira (primary school), the Government Printing Press and the national bank (Caixa de Providencia). However, the family suffered a financial downfall in 1818 following a disagreement with the new Viceroy, Comte de Rio, which led to the Kamats being declared debtors to the State and the mortgaging of their properties.

=== The house ===
The house is believed to have belonged to the Poundekar family, who were beadmakers under the rule of the Sultanate of Bijapur. As per the family records, the house was built in 1698.

== Architecture ==
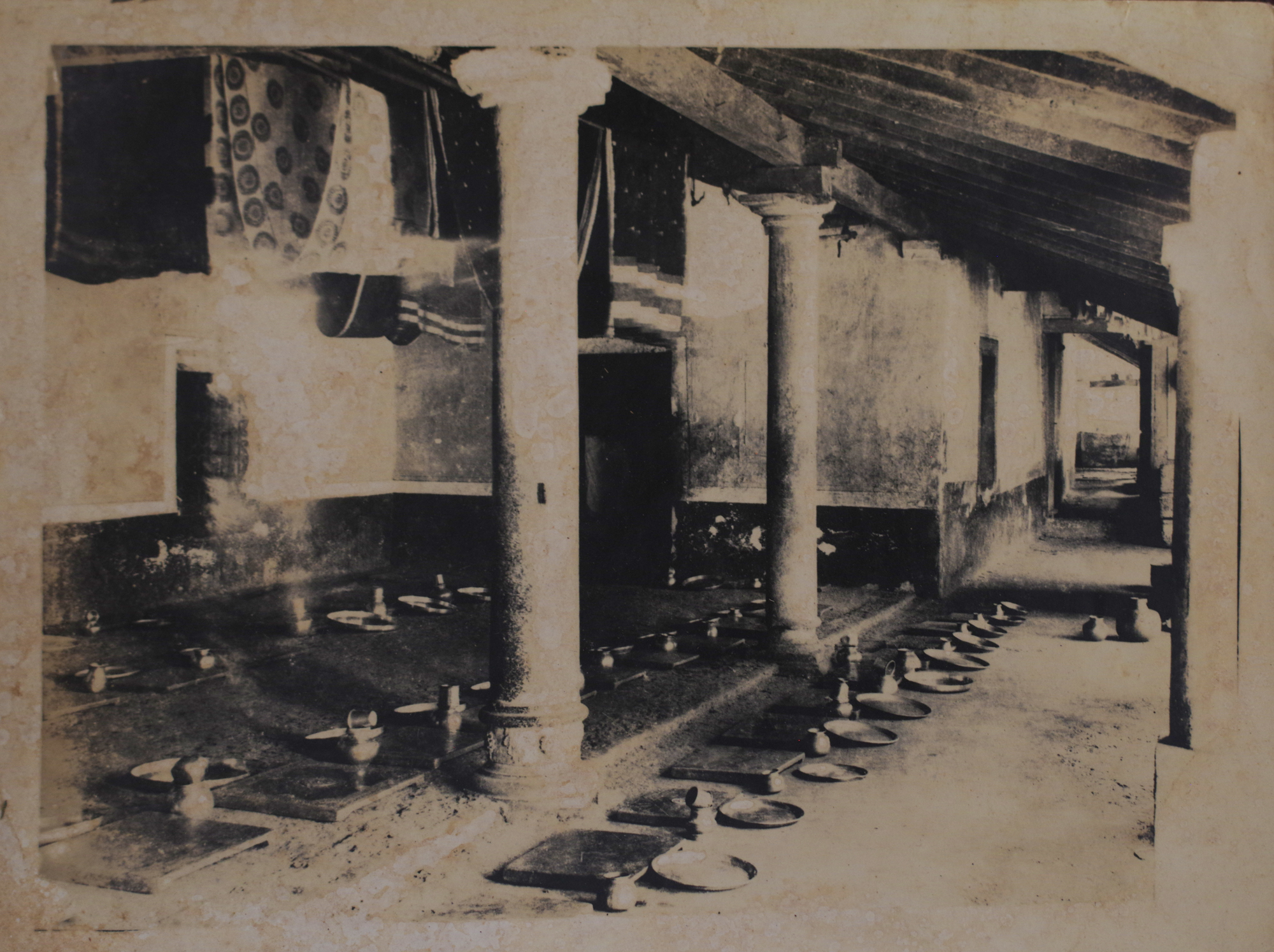
Columns of the Mhamai Kamat House on display. On the floor are plates aligned for the annual Anant Chaturdashi feast at the house.

The Mhamai Kamat House is a large, two-floored structure with long corridors and halls. It contains 35 rooms and three internal courtyards, known as raj angonns. The windows are notable for their triangular wooden bars, which look out onto the streets of Panaji.

The house is centrally located near the Adil Shah Palace (the Old Secretariat). The residence has also functioned as a repository for vast archives of historical records, including loose bundles and boxes stored in various corners of the home. These records were then donated to the Xavier Centre of Historical Research, which was then run by Teotónio de Souza, who analysed the archives and wrote about the Kamat family and the house.

== Commercial activities ==
During its peak, the family operated an extensive trade network that linked Goa to Africa, Macau, Surat, and Daman and Diu. Their trade included a diverse range of goods such as luxury items (pearls, diamonds, corals, and porcelain), commodities (wine, cheese, opium, textiles, and spices like arecanut) and raw materials (hides and tiles).

The family also provided supplies for stranded ships. The business side of the family also included the importation of artifacts and furniture, facilitated by their close access to the Viceroy's Palace.

== Culture and social life ==
The house was known for its hospitality, often hosting students, scholars, and government officials. As a massive joint family, the household sometimes accommodated over sixty members at once.

=== Conch shell ===
When a member of the Mhamai Kamat family found a rare right-handed conch being used as paperweight on a Portuguese official's desk on a ship, they rescued it and placed it in the house, adorning it with gemstones and pearls and dedicating it to Vishnu. Today, the conch shell is open for public display on the day of Anant Chaturdashi.

=== Religious traditions ===
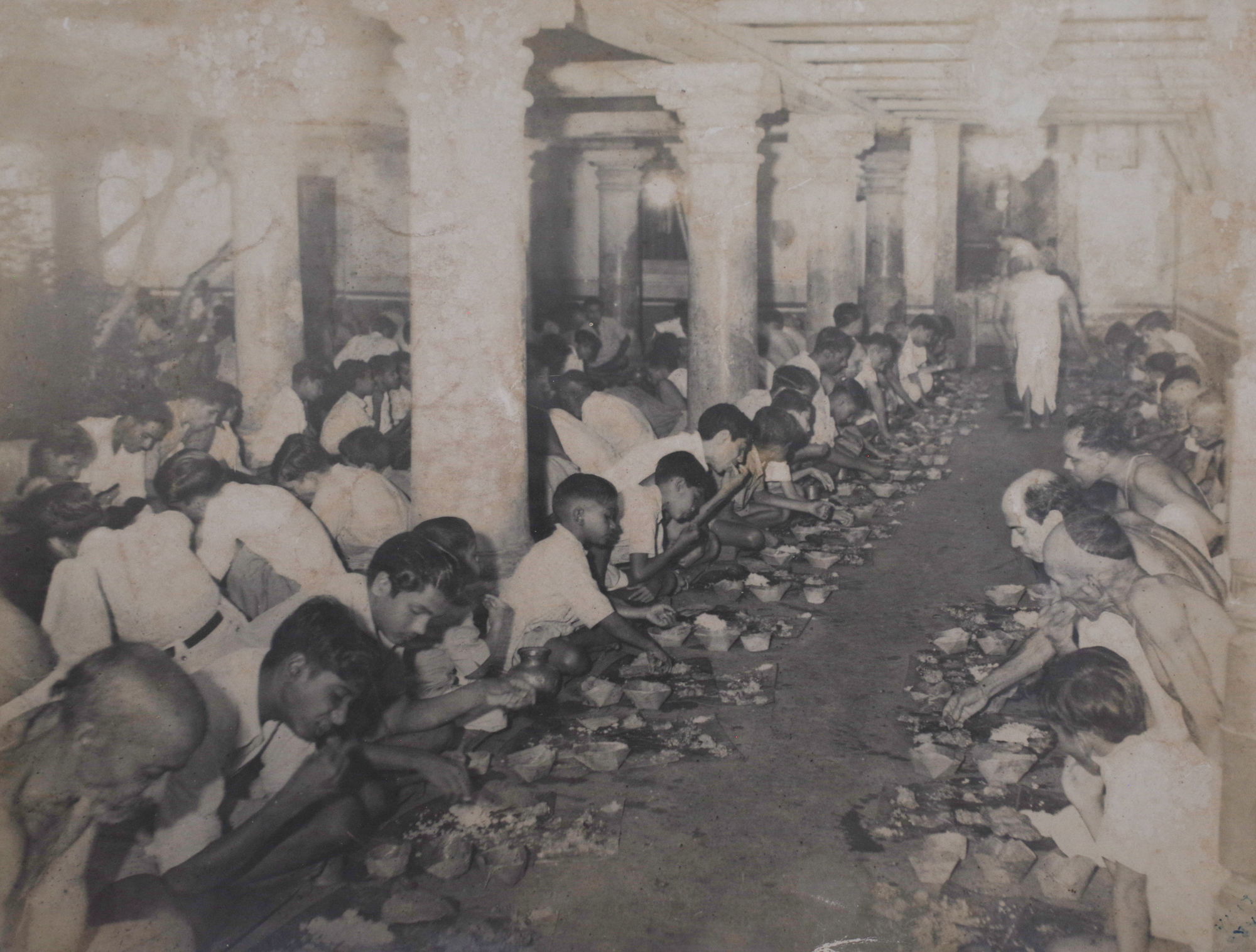
Annual Anant Chaturdashi feast at the Mhamai Kamat House

Festivals such as Ganesh Chaturthi (Chavath) and Anant Chaturdashi are celebrated in a grand manner. During periods when idol worship was restricted, the family venerated a paper image of Ganesh. This tradition of worshipping a paper image for Ganesh Chaturthi continues till date. Since the deity cannot be immersed, only the offerings like flowers, fruits and rice are immersed in the neighbourhood well. Known as Patrecho Ganapati, this image was preserved from the Portuguese by storing it in an old food storage box, according to historian Maria de Lourdes Bravo da Costa Rodrigues.

A unique family legend involves a "snake curse" resulting from an ancestor killing a snake. To make amends, the family has worshipped Anant and also hosts a mahaprasad on Ananta Chaturdashi that can attract up to 1,000 guests. The family advertises this in newspapers. The tradition started in 1890. Cooks are brought from Karnataka. After a big aarti, the dinner begins at about 7 P.M. and darshan goes on till midnight. This is followed by an overnight kirtan programme by the local artisans.

=== Mushtifund Saunstha ===
In 1908, Phondushastri Karande spoke at a public meeting at the Mhamai Kamat House. The result of this meeting was the founding of the Mushtifund Saunstha in Panaji for the education of the underprivileged.
