= Jayant S. Vaidya =

British-Indian surgeon and oncologist

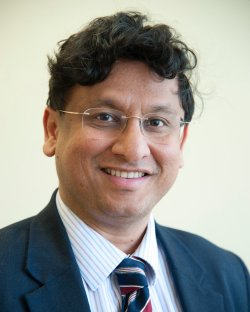
- Born: Goa, India
- Citizenship: United Kingdom
- Education: Goa Medical College; Tata Memorial Centre; University of Mumbai (MBBS, MS, DNB ) University College London (PhD); Royal College of Surgeons (FRCS, FRCS (Gen Surgery))
- Known for: Targeted intra-operative radiotherapy
- Scientific career
- Fields: Oncology, Surgery
- Workplaces: University College London

Jayant S. Vaidya is a British-Indian surgeon-oncologist and clinical academic who, together with Michael Baum and Jeffrey Tobias, developed the technique called targeted intra-operative radiotherapy (TARGIT). He is a professor of surgery and oncology at the University College London, London and the author of two books on breast cancer, one on tobacco eradication, and over 200 academic articles.

== Early life and education ==
Vaidya was born in Goa, India, to Sharad Vaidya, a cancer surgeon, and Nirmala Vaidya, who together ran the Vaidya Hospital in Panaji, Goa, India.

Vaidya received his medical degree (MBBS) from Goa Medical College, Bombay University. He received his first research grant while in the medical school. He moved to Mumbai in 1989 for his surgical oncology residency training and fellowship at municipal hospitals in Mumbai and the Tata Memorial Cancer Hospital.

He migrated to London in the 1990s. In London, he worked as a surgical registrar in several London hospitals and as a clinical lecturer and research fellow at the University College London Hospital. Subsequently, he was elected Fellow of the Royal College of Surgeons of Glasgow and completed his PhD from University College London (UCL), followed by board certification by the Surgical Royal Colleges of Great Britain and Ireland.

== Career ==
In early 2000s, Vaidya developed targeted intraoperative radiotherapy for breast cancer. From 2004 to 2008, he was Senior Lecturer at the University of Dundee and the Department of Surgery & Molecular Oncology, Ninewells Hospital, where he led the targeted intraoperative radiotherapy program and related breast cancer research. In 2008, he joined as a chair in the Division of Surgery and Interventional Science, University College London.

=== Anti-tobacco education and campaign ===
Vaidya has been involved in the anti-tobacco movement from an early age with his father, who was a vocal critic of tobacco use. His opinions on tobacco ban have appeared on BBC in the past. He has actively campaigned against the advertising of tobacco in any form in sponsorships of sport, such as cricket. This was when India national cricket team shirts displayed the Wills logo. He has also authored a book by the name Tobacco Quit India.

== Targeted-intraoperative radiotherapy ==
During his surgical residency training at Tata Memorial Hospital in Mumbai, Vaidya was concerned about patients who had to make several visits to the hospital for 6 weeks postoperative radiotherapy. Some patients opted for mastectomy rather than trying to save healthy tissue, as they could not afford radiotherapy.

Vaidya developed the technique he called targeted-intraoperative radiotherapy (TARGIT) in 1998, along with fellow UCL clinical academics Jeffrey Tobias and Michael Baum and in collaboration with device manufacturers. The technique involves delivering single-dose radiotherapy from inside the body via a small ball-shaped device placed inside the breast immediately after lumpectomy while the patient is still under anaesthesia. The procedure lasts for 20 to 30 minutes. This may remove the need for additional hospital visits, thereby improving patient safety and well-being.

The first patient was treated with TARGIT in July 1998 at the Middlesex Hospital in London. By 2014, TARGIT has been adopted at nearly 250+ centres in over 35 countries, including by the NHS.

Vaidya has appeared in various interviews on international media channels and featured on international dailies in connection with his work on breast cancer treatment.

== Personal life ==
His family comes from Keri, Ponda, Goa. The surname "Vaidya" is a Sanskrit word meaning "doctor" or "traditional physician." The family derives this name from practicing medicine for over 300 years. He is the great-grandnephew of Dada Vaidya, a famous 19th century doctor from Goa.

Vaidya has a wife and two children.

== Selected publications ==
=== Articles ===
- Vaidya, Jayant S.; Bulsara, Max; Baum, Michael; Wenz, Frederik; Massarut, Samuele; Pigorsch, Steffi; Alvarado, Michael; Douek, Michael; Saunders, Christobel; Flyger, Henrik L.; Eiermann, Wolfgang (2020-08-19). "Long term survival and local control outcomes from single dose targeted intraoperative radiotherapy during lumpectomy (TARGIT-IORT) for early breast cancer: TARGIT-A randomised clinical trial". BMJ. 370 m2836. doi:10.1136/bmj.m2836. ISSN 1756-1833. PMC 7500441. PMID 32816842.
- Vaidya JS, Vyas JJ, Chinoy RF, Merchant N, Sharma OP, Mittra I (September 1996). "Multicentricity of breast cancer: whole-organ analysis and clinical implications". Br. J. Cancer. 74 (5): 820–4. doi:10.1038/bjc.1996.442. PMC 2074702. PMID 8795588.
- Belletti B, Vaidya JS, D'Andrea S, et al. (March 2008). "Targeted intraoperative radiotherapy impairs the stimulation of breast cancer cell proliferation and invasion caused by surgical wounding". Clin. Cancer Res. 14 (5): 1325–32. doi:10.1158/1078-0432.CCR-07-4453. PMID 18316551.
- Vaidya JS, Baum M, Tobias JS, Morgan S, D'Souza D (June 2002). "The novel technique of delivering targeted intraoperative radiotherapy (Targit) for early breast cancer". Eur J Surg Oncol. 28 (4): 447–54. doi:10.1053/ejso.2002.1275. PMID 12099658.
- Vaidya, Jayant S (31 October 2013). "IORT for breast cancer – the surgical technique of TARGIT".

=== Books ===
- Vaidya, Jayant S.; Patkar, Vivek (2016). Fast Facts: Early Breast Cancer. Healthpress Press. ISBN 978-1-910797-12-9.
- Vaidya, Jayant S.; Joseph, David (2014). Fast Facts Breast Cancer. Healthpress Press. ISBN 978-1-908541-62-8.
