= Goa State Museum =

Archaeological museum in Goa, India

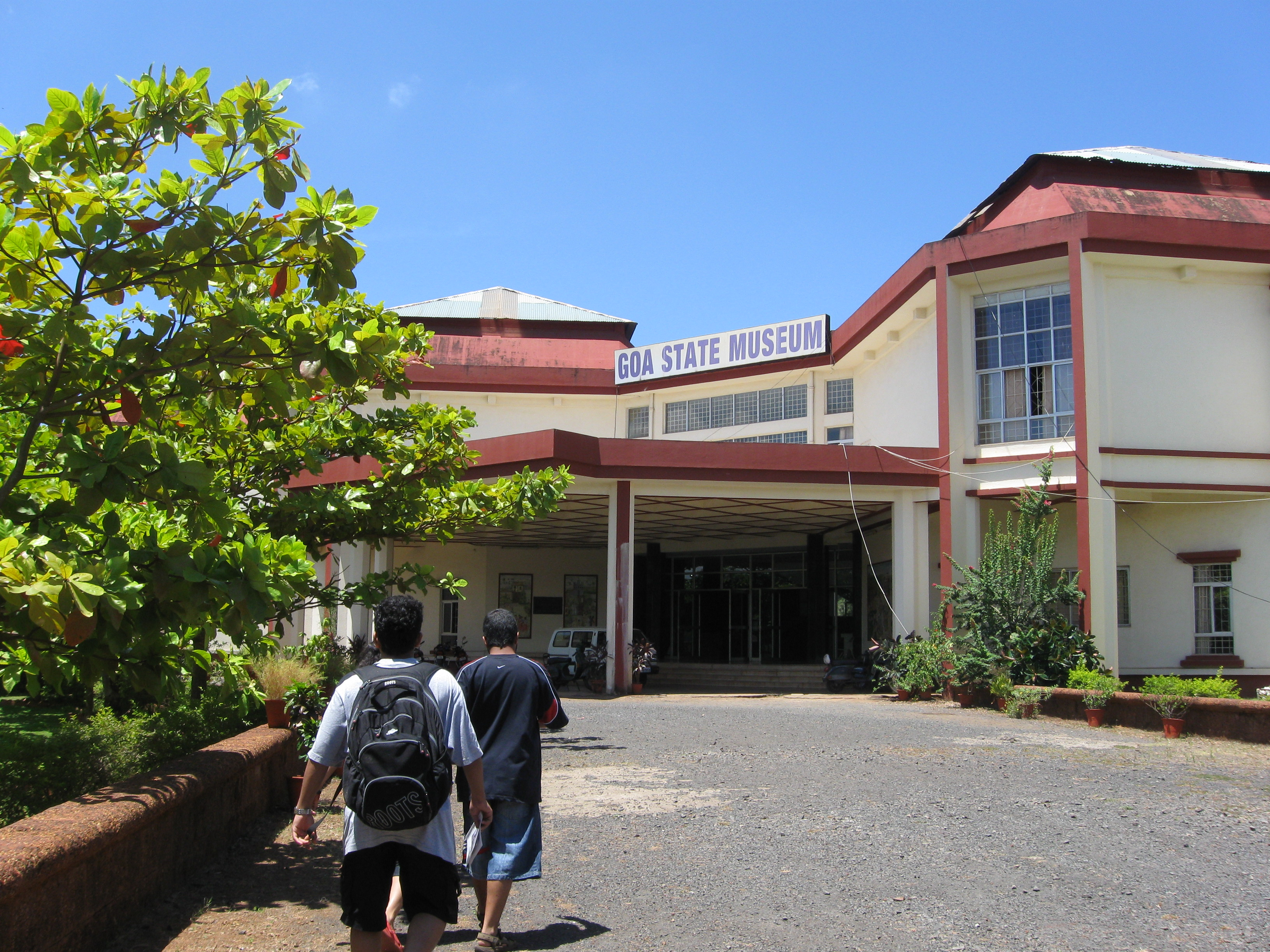
- Visitors entering Goa State Museum, May 2008
- Established: 29 September 1977 and in a new building on 18 June 1996
- Location: Adil Shah Palace (Old Secretariat), Panaji, Goa, India
- Coordinates: 15.4931401°N 73.8330715°E
- Website: http://goamuseum.gov.in/

Goa State Museum, also known as the State Archaeology Museum, Panaji, is a museum in Goa, India. Established in 1977, it contains departments including Ancient History and Archaeology, Art and Craft, and Geology. The museum, as of 2008, had about 8,000 artifacts on display, including stone sculptures, wooden objects, carvings, bronzes, paintings, manuscripts, rare coins, and anthropological objects. Currently, the Museum is located at the Adil Shah Palace (Old Secretariat) in Panaji. The Museum's erstwhile premises at the EDC Complex in Patto, Panaji shall be demolished to make way for a new Museum building.

The museum was earlier located at the EDC Complex in Patto, Panaji; before that, it was housed at St. Inez, Panaji. Currently, the Museum is located at the Adil Shah's Palace (Old Secretariat) in Panaji. The Museum's erstwhile premises at the EDC Complex in Patto, Panaji shall be demolished to make way for a new Museum building.

== History ==
The museum was created as an Archaeology Museum unit of the Department of Archives in Goa in 1973, opening a small museum in a rented building on 29 September 1977. After building a new museum complex, it was formally inaugurated by the President of India on 18 June 1996. The museum's exhibits provide information about the ancient historical and cultural traditions of Goa, which are displayed thematically, to showcase different aspects of the history and culture of Goa.

== Galleries ==
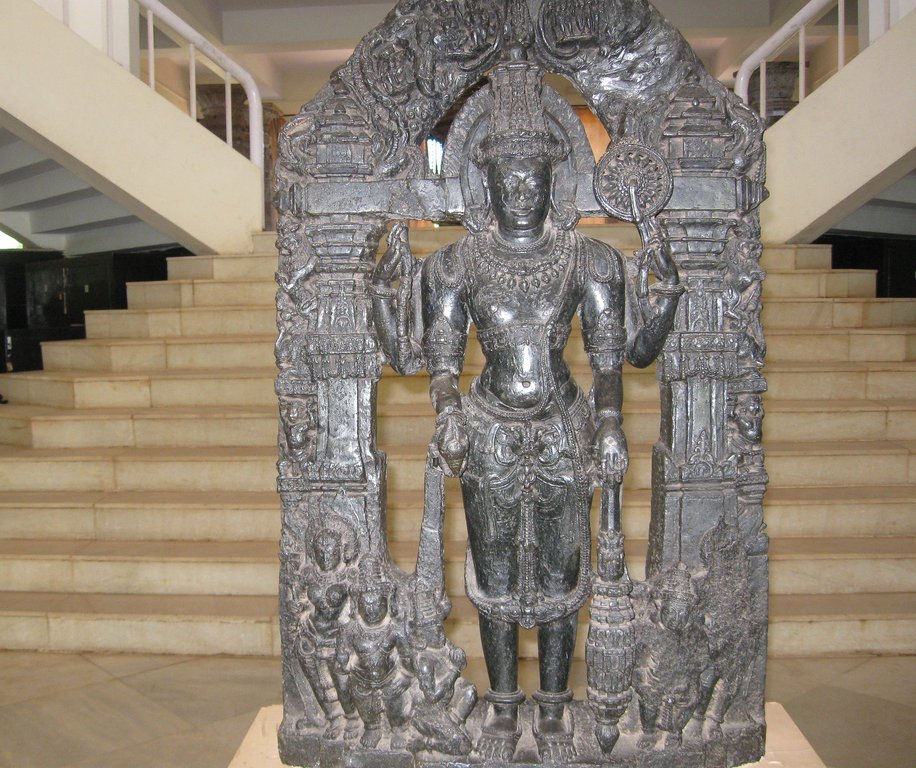
Sculpture at the entrance of the Museum

The Goa State Museum has fourteen galleries, arranged thematically, which are the: Sculpture Gallery, Christian Art Gallery, Printing History Gallery, Banerji Art Gallery, Religious Expression Gallery, Cultural Anthropology, Contemporary Art Gallery, Numismatics Gallery, Goa's Freedom Struggle Gallery, Menezes Braganza Gallery, Furniture Gallery, Natural Heritage of Goa Gallery, Environment & Development Gallery, and Geology Gallery. The museum has about 8,000 artifacts representing all regions of India, as well as 645 objects borrowed from the Institute Menezes Braganza Art Gallery and the Kala Academy.

=== Art ===
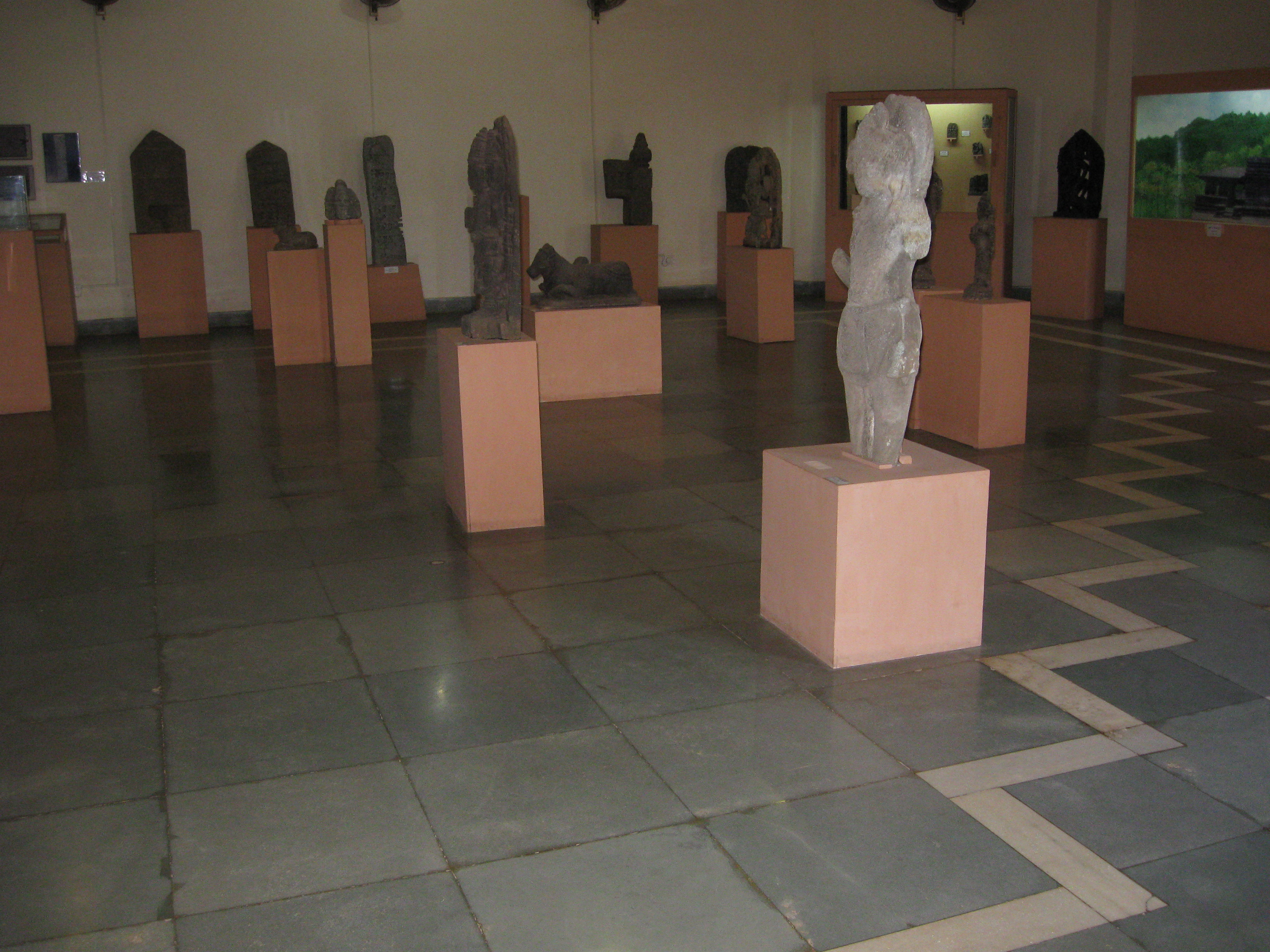
Sculpture Gallery

The Sculpture Gallery predominantly exhibits artifacts of Hindu and Jain sculptures, including bronzes, from the 4th to the 8th centuries. The ancient sculptures are of Kubera, Yakshi, Uma and Mahishasuramardini from Netravali. There are two undated stone sculptures of the Southern-Silahara period, one of two warriors from Kundai called Kantadev which was earlier located in front of the Navadurga temple, and another of Surya which was earlier part of the circumbulatory (pradakshinapath) of the Shri Chandreshwar Bhutnath Temple. There are also bronze sculptures which are copies of European artists including Claude and Dalon. The gallery has an inscription dated to 1049 on a copper plate of Vira Varma, the Kadamba king.

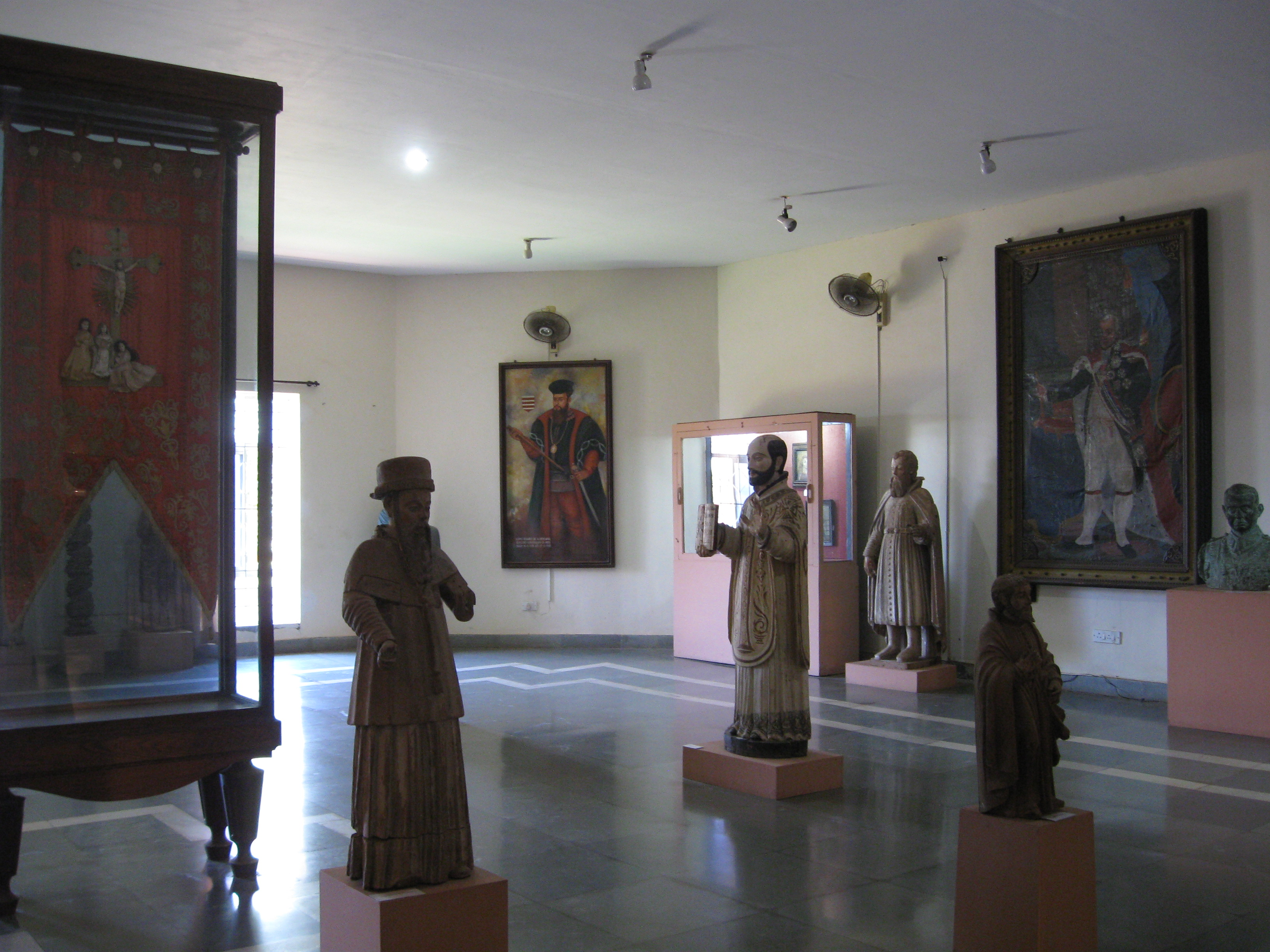
Christian Art Gallery

In the Christian Art Gallery, there are many types of wooden sculptures of saints, and devotional paintings and some wooden furniture of the colonial period. There are also exhibits of Jain busts, three large raised works of art in relief, busts of Luís de Camões, Afonso de Albuquerque, and Dom João de Castro, which was earlier on the walls of the Municipal Gardens.

The Banerji Art Gallery has number of exhibits gifted to the museum by S. K. Banerji, a former Governor of Goa and hence the gallery is named after him. Some of the exhibits are terracota antiquities of Indus Valley civilization, seals of Janapadas, plastic art of the Gandhara school of art, bronze images from South India, wooden images of South East Asia, and Dhokra non–ferrous metal casting of art works. There are also miniature paintings of Rajasthan of the Jaipur School, Marwar school, Mewar school and so forth, Mughal paintings, Nathdwara, patachitras from Orissa, and paintings of contemporary artists.

An exhibit within the Contemporary Art Gallery includes a pair of an antique rotary lottery machines. These were known as Provedoria lottery machines manufactured in Lisbon. A few pictures also display the procedure for operating these machines. They have thousands of wooden balls, and the first lottery draw is stated to have been held in 1947. There are many miniature paintings from different regions of India. The gallery has paintings and sculptures of Goan and Indian artists such as R. Chimulkar, F. N. Souza, S. H. Raza, M. F. Hussain, K. H. Ara and many more which have been borrowed from the Kala Academy and Institute of Menezes Braganza. A flag which marks Portuguese victory over the Dutch is also on display.

Menezes Braganza Gallery contains contemporary Goan and Indian art, as well as portrait pictures of Portuguese Governors of Goa and Prime Ministers.

=== Science ===
Viragal or hero stones, which belonged to the King Biravarma period, are exhibited in the Cultural Anthropology Gallery. These stones represent the naval battle fought between the army of rulers of Gopalapattanam and Honavar and are commemorative stones erected to the memory of naval soldiers who died during the naval battle of the local chieftain Biravarma who is believed to have ruled over Goa. The stones indicate advanced technological skills that was in practice in building naval craft for battle. One such viragal depicts a ship with an "axial rudder" with seven rowers. In another viragal, there are nine oar holes and a "stern-post rudder" which was a further technological improvement over the axial rudder. These exhibits indicate that the Chalukyan kings like Kirtivarman I (566–597) ruled over Goan territory. The exhibits also consist of ancient period utility vessels, many types of games, weights and measures, a replica of a sugarcane crusher, crane and farm implements as well as clay models of different vocations.

The Environment & Development Gallery has cultural exhibits from many villages of Goa. The Geology Gallery has a fossil bone dated 10,000 BC.

=== Others ===
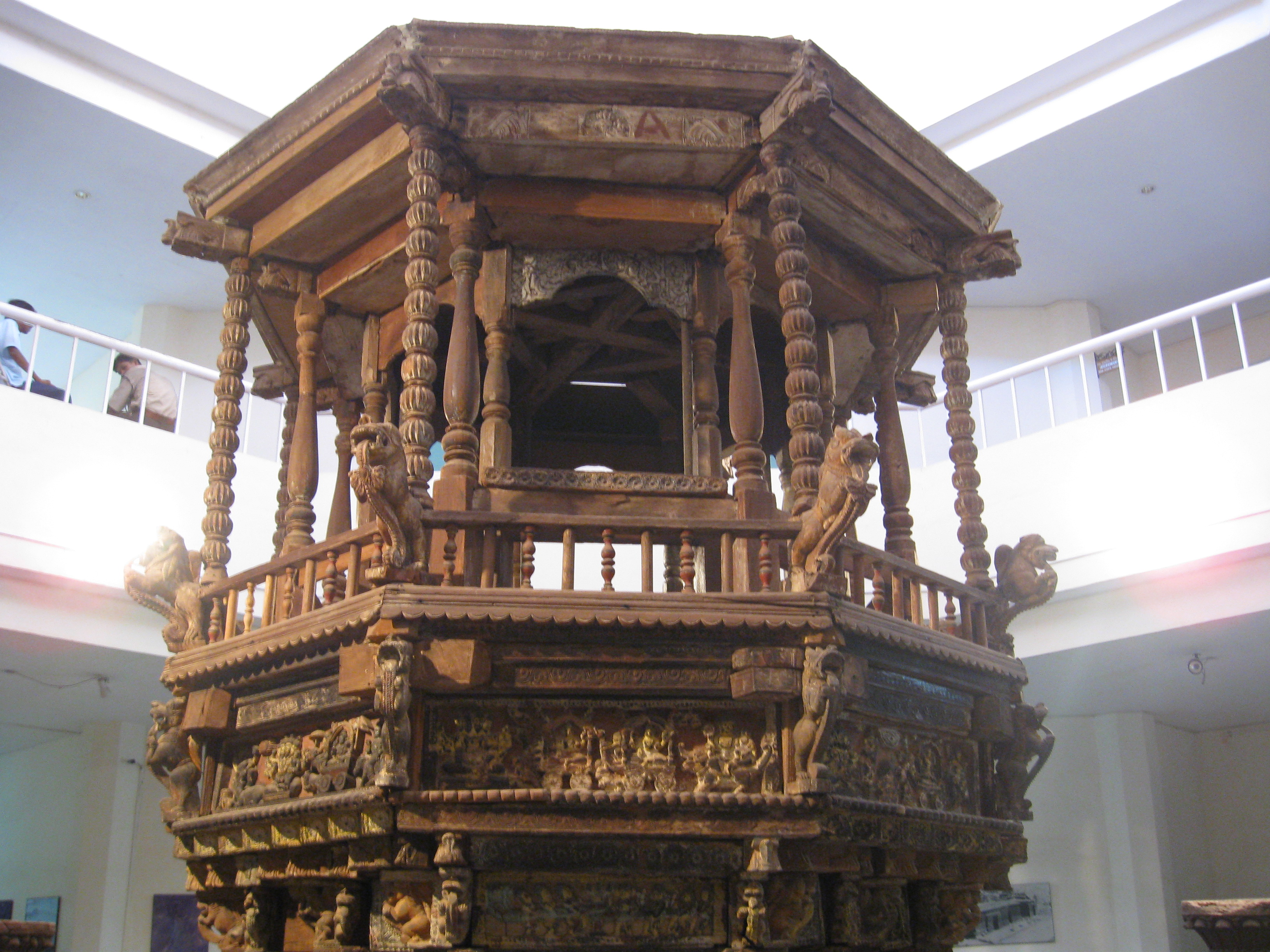
A wooden chariot used in festivals

The Religious Expression Gallery has a highly impressive sculpture of Lord Vishnu dated to the Gupta period. Other exhibits display a variety of multi-cultural religious colloquium of Goa's past. A replica of "Tarang", a traditional musical instruments, vessels used in religious rites, manuscripts in palm-leaf and paper of many religious scriptures and some photographs of many religious rites and festivals.

The Numismatics Gallery has a display of Portuguese-era coins. The Furniture Gallery contains an intricately carved table and high-backed chairs which was part of the Portuguese Inquisition held in Goa of the 16th century. The legs of the table have carved lions and an eagle in one half and four figures of human beings in the other half. Furniture exhibits include a chair of the Portuguese Governor General, a sofa set with inlay work in ivory, ivory images of small size, chest of drawers and some western style furniture. In this gallery the prominent exhibit is of an intricately carved wooden chariot of the 18th century used in festivals.

== Gallery ==
Goa State Museum Pictures

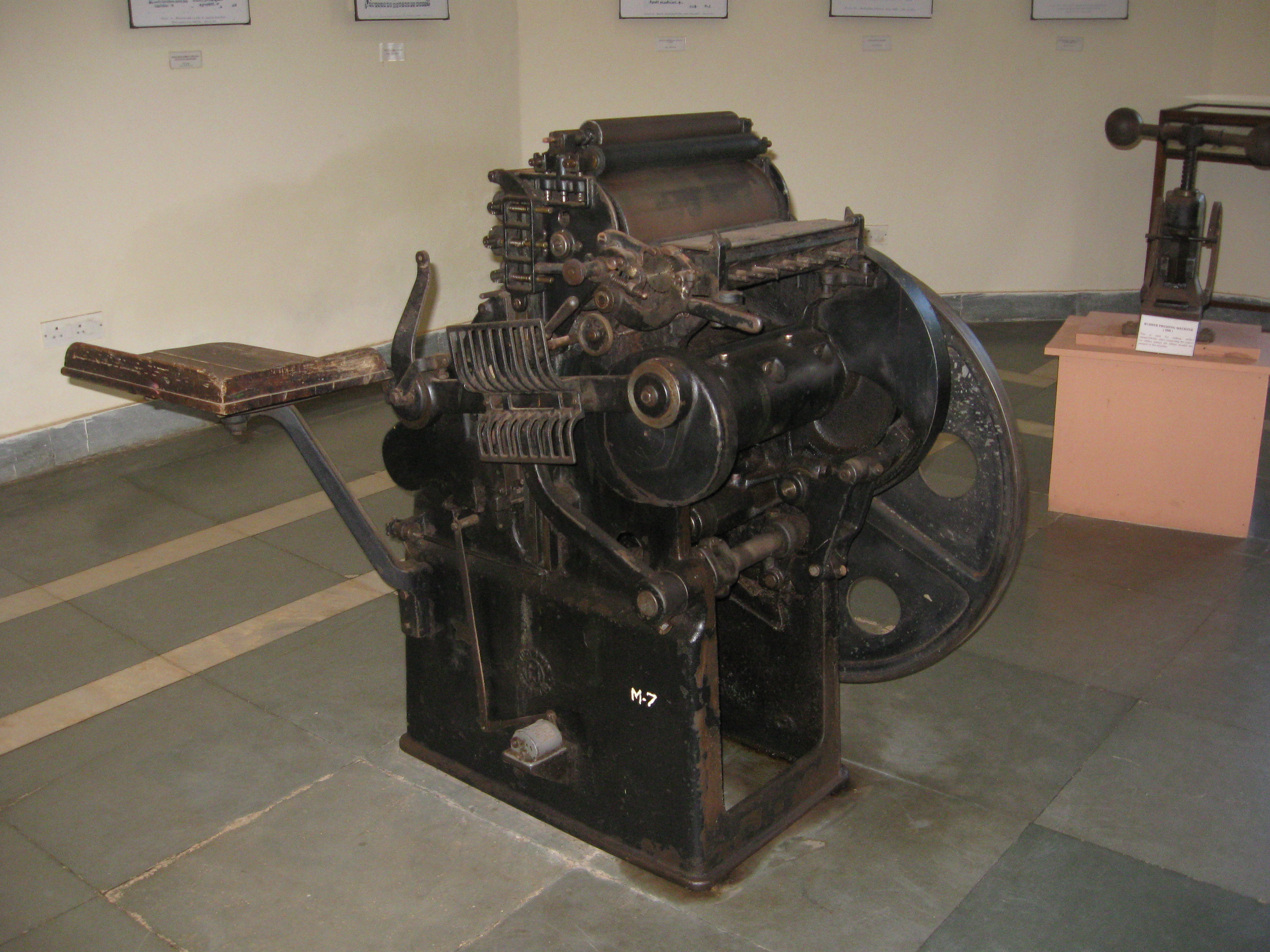
Old Printing Press

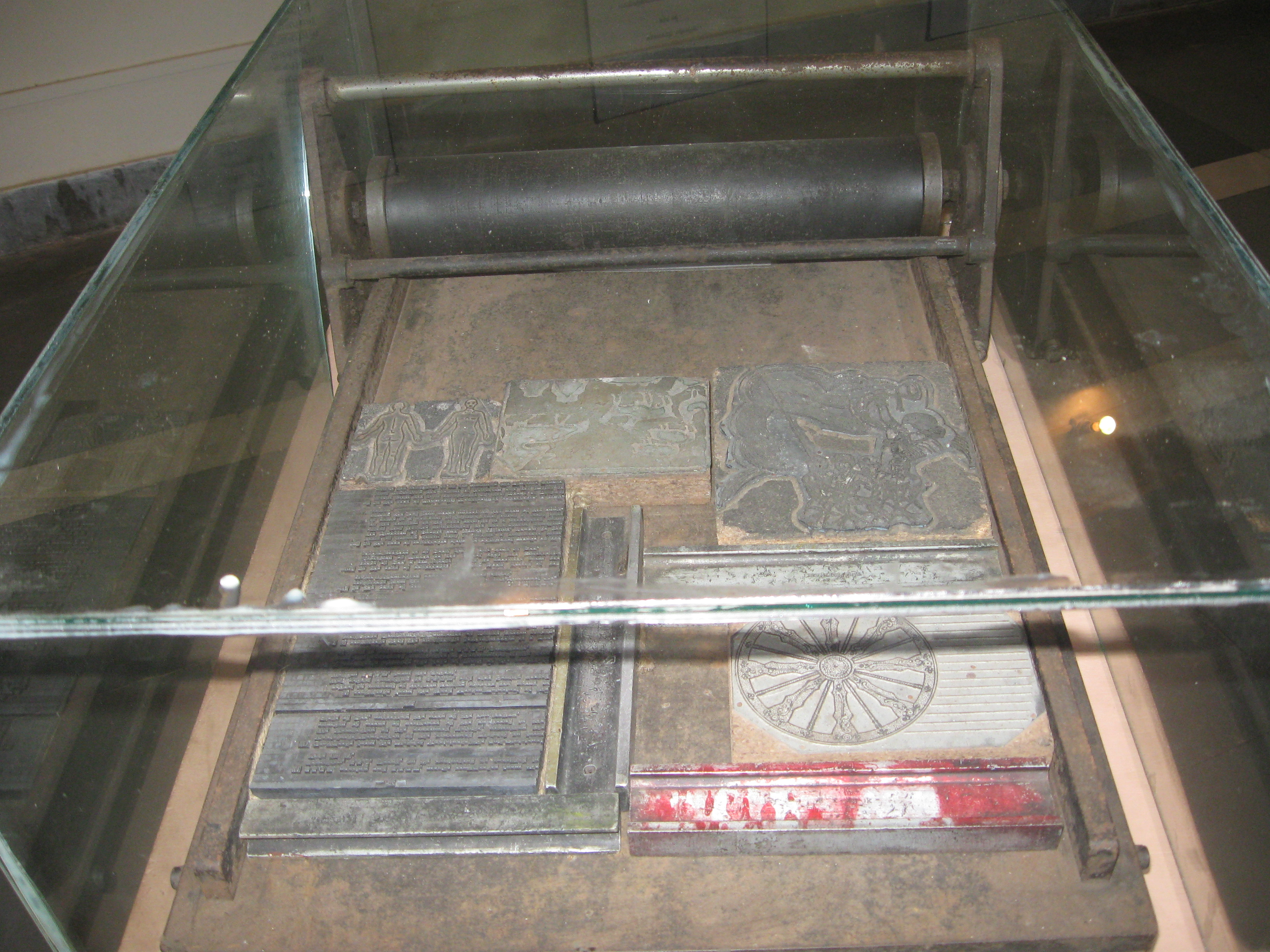
Plates used for printing on newspapers and books

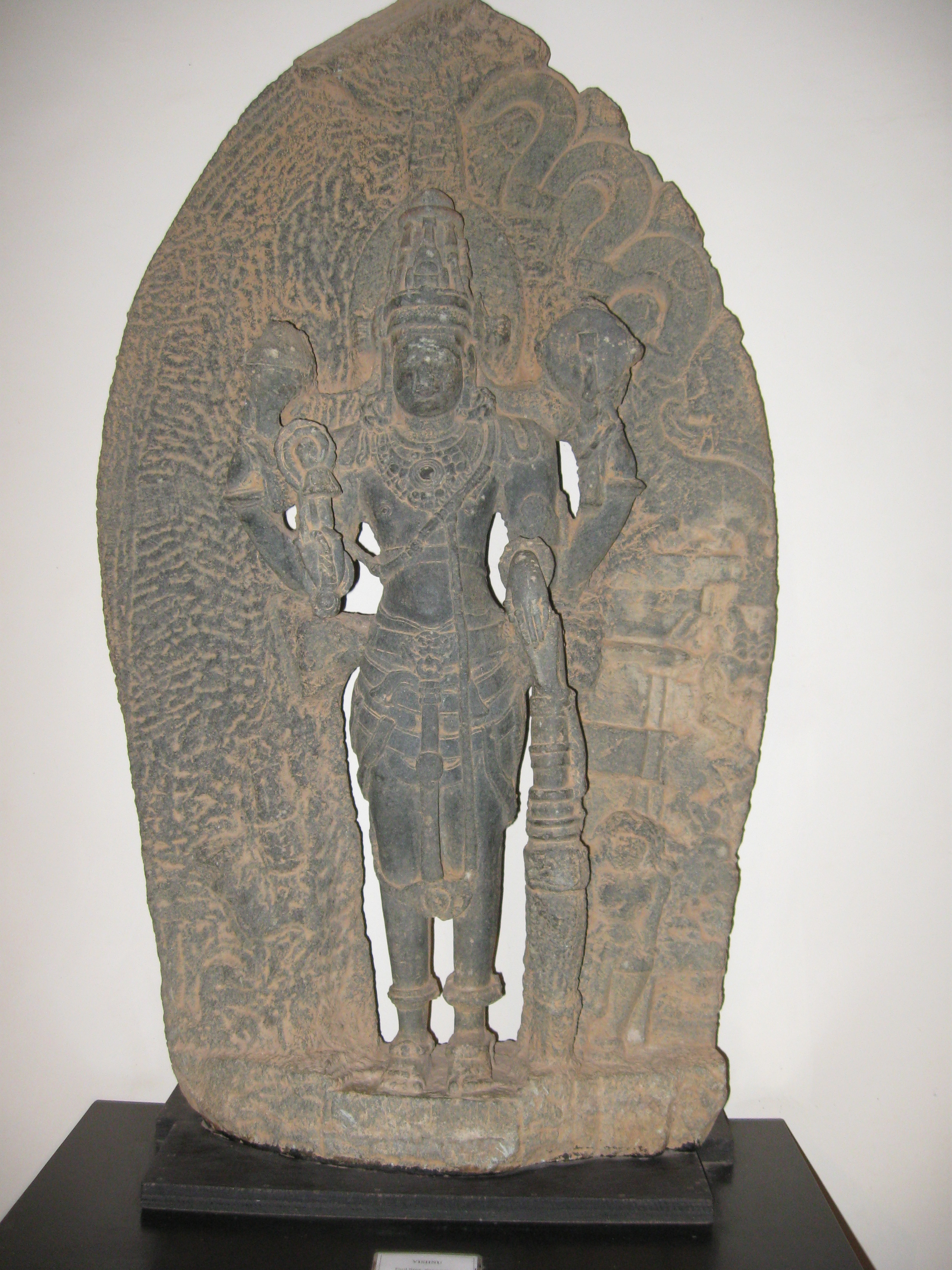

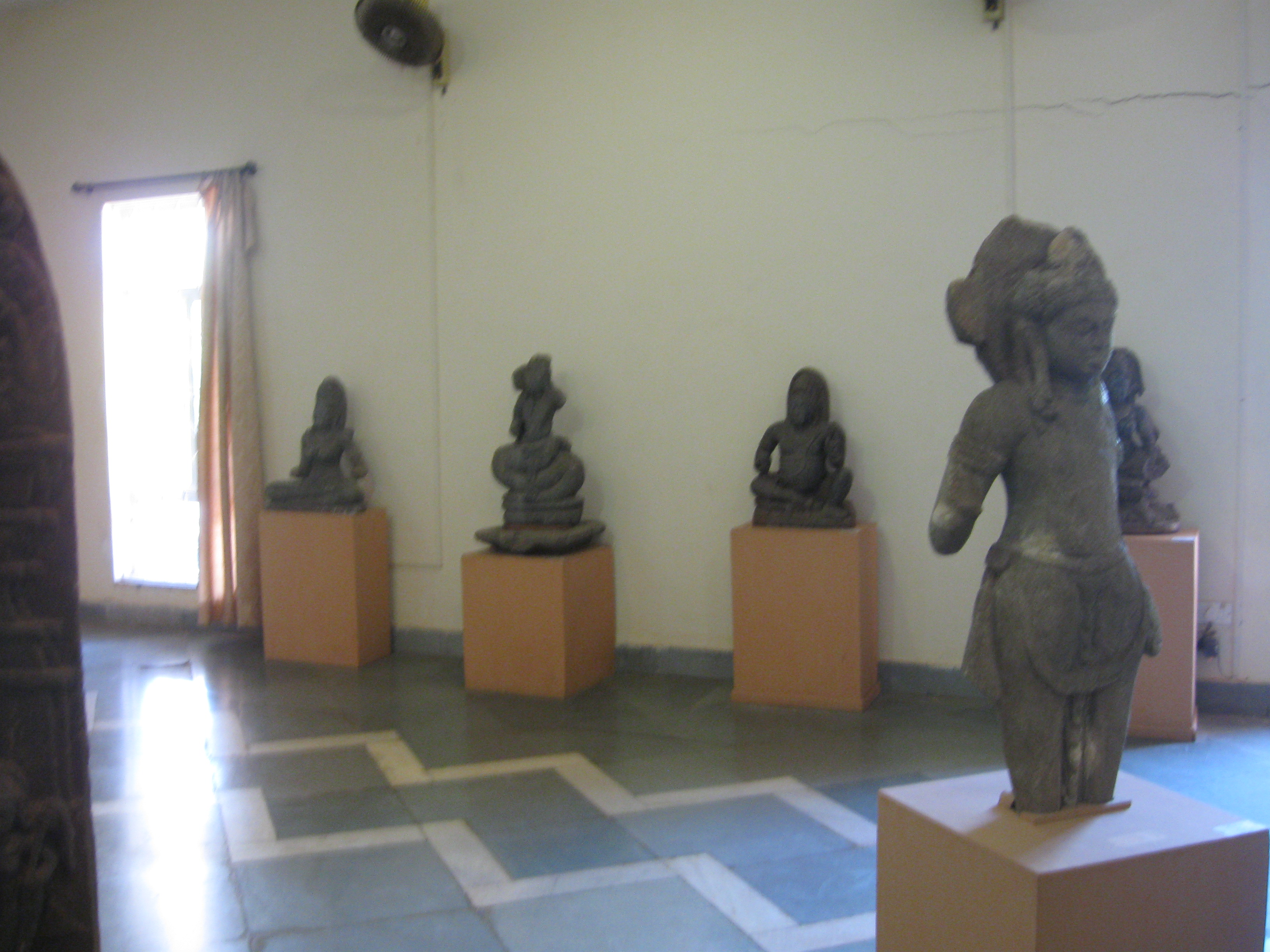
Sculpture Gallery

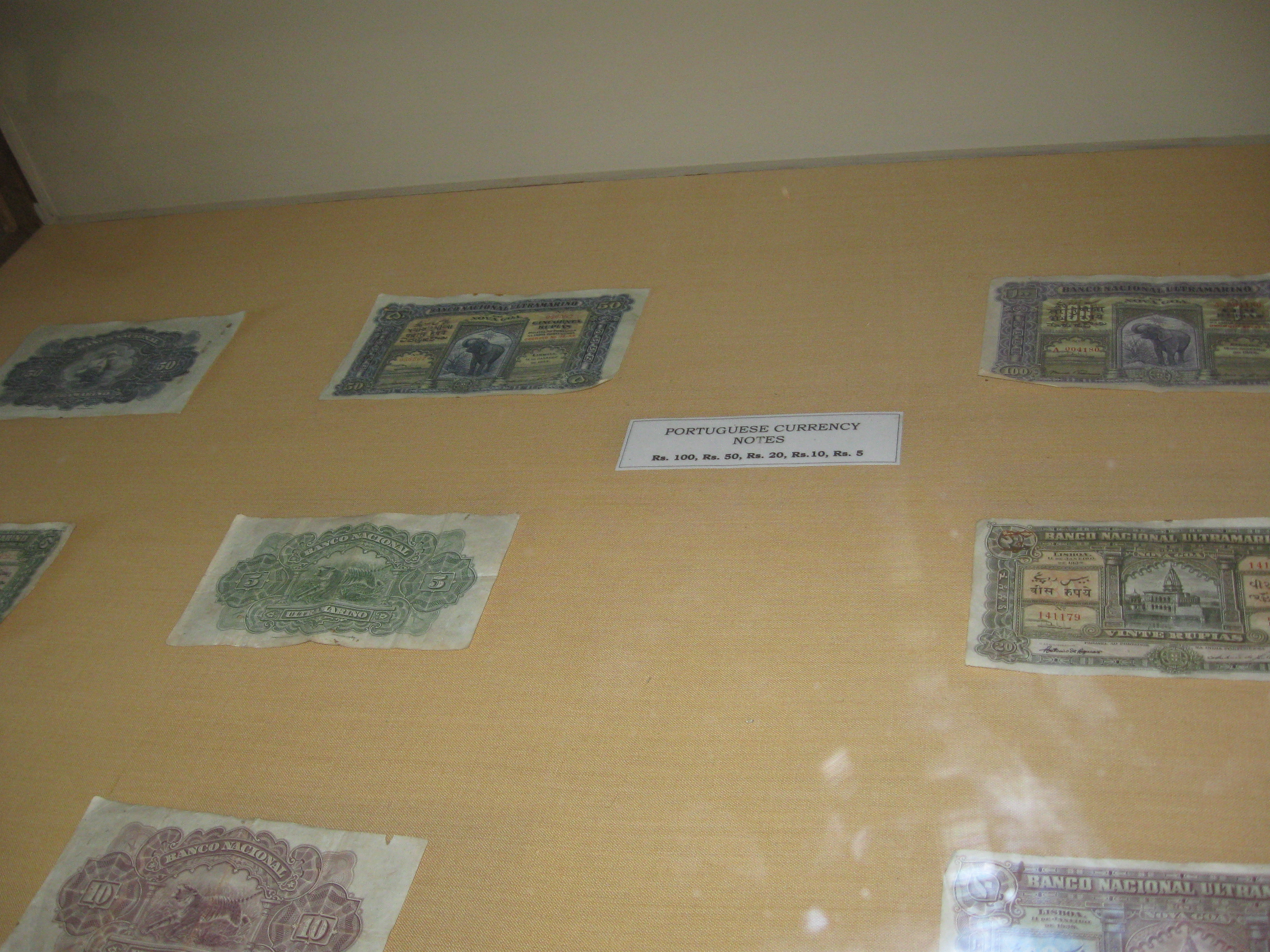
Rare Portuguese Era Notes

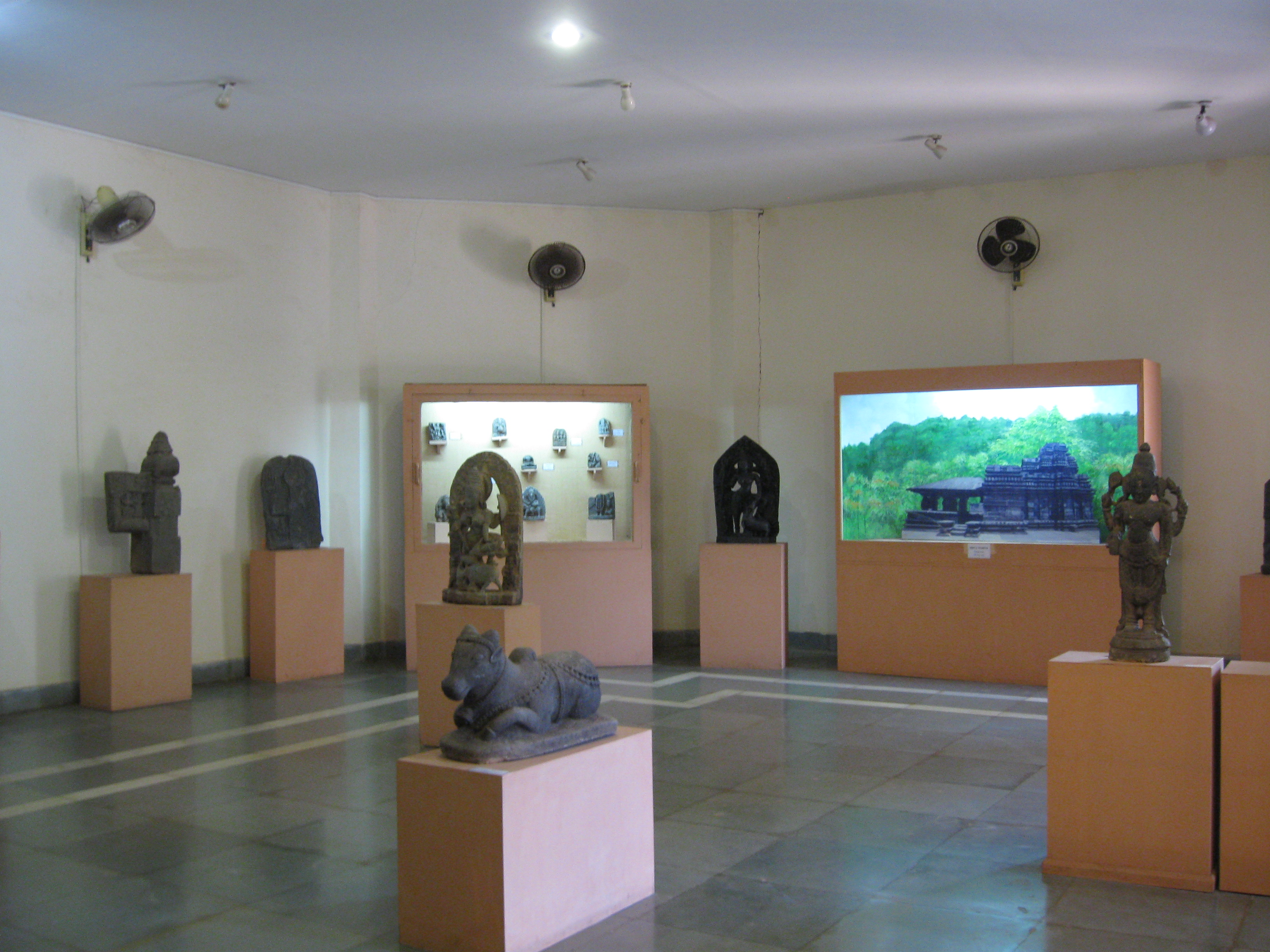
Artifacts on display

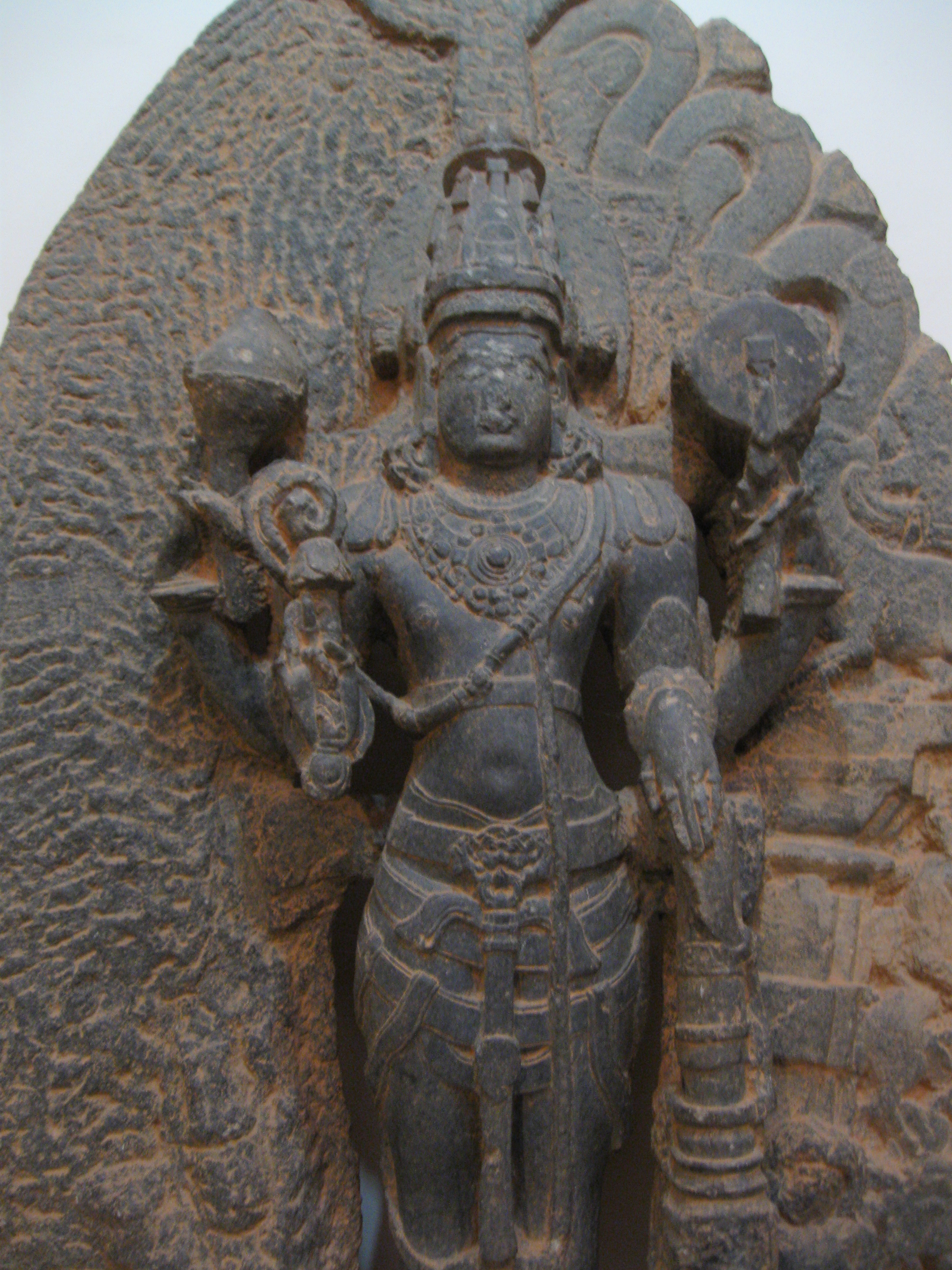
A figurine

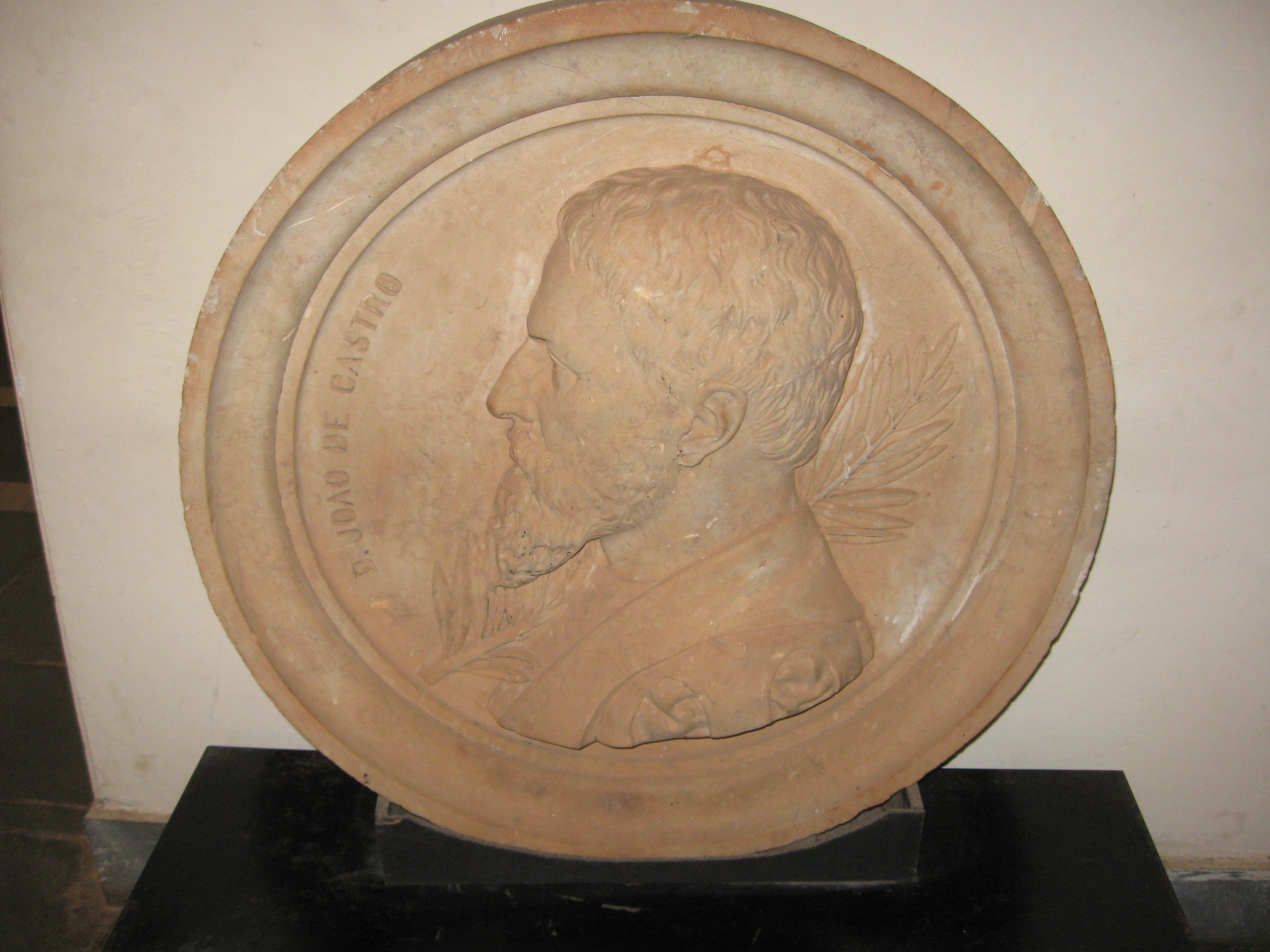
Artifact from Portuguese Era

== See also ==
- Museum of Goa

== Bibliography ==
- Harding, Paul (2003). Goa. Melbourne London: Lonely Planet. ISBN 978-1-74059-139-3.
- McCulloch, Victoria; Stott, David (30 October 2013). Goa (with Mumbai). Bath: Footprint Travel Guides. ISBN 978-1-909268-42-5.
- Malekandathil, Pius (2010). Maritime India: Trade, Religion and Polity in the Indian Ocean. Delhi: Primus Book. ISBN 978-93-80607-01-6.
- Mitragotri, Vithal Raghavendra (1999). A socio-cultural history of Goa from the Bhojas to the Vijayanagara. Institute Menezes Braganza.
- Thomas, Amelia; Karafin, Amy (2009). Goa and Mumbai. Vic. Oakland, CA: Lonely Planet. ISBN 978-1-74104-894-0.
