= Mushtifund Saunstha =

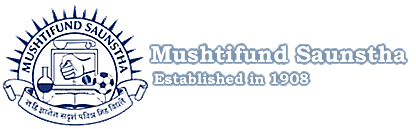
- Panaji, Goa; India

Information
- Type: School
- Established: 1908
- Website: www.mushtifundsaunstha.org

Mushtifund Saunstha, or simply The Saunstha, is a not-for-profit educational institution founded in 1908 in Goa, India by locals aspiring to spread elementary education in the native Konkani and Marathi language as opposed to that in the Portuguese language in use because it was the primary language of instruction as a direct consequence of the Portuguese rule in Goa. The Saunstha has a student community of over 2,500. It runs three elementary schools, one high school, one junior college, and one technical school.

The Saunstha operates from its main building in the heart of the Panaji city on Dr Dada Vaidya Road. The Mushtifund Middle School operates from the Fontainhas (quarter) campus.

== Etymology ==
The word "Mushtifund" is derived from the Sanskrit word "Mushti" for "fist" and the English word "fund" for "funds" honouring the school’s community backed initial financing, figuratively known as “fistfuls of rice”.

== History ==
The history of the institution dates back more than a hundred years. In 1908, a handful of locals, including Phondushastri Karande, gathered at the Mhamai Kamat House in Panaji to found an educational society to propagate knowledge and elementary education using Marathi as a medium of instruction. This resulted in what we know today as the Mushtifund Saunstha.

Funding was not easy to find for such a society so a handful of rice instead of cash was collected from Goan households, and sold it in the markets in exchange for cash to run the Saunstha. This explains the name "Mushtifund", which means, funds collected in handfuls.

During the 1970s only 4 classes were taught. As of 2016, the institution provides education for students from Kindergarten all the way to 12th grade (Mushtifund Higher Secondary).

== Sections ==
=== Mushtifund Primary School ===
Mushtifund Primary offers schooling from kindergarten to 4th grade. There are two subdivisions for the primary section, one with the medium of instruction as Marathi, the other to be English. This offers children brought up in a traditional environment to build up their level without lagging behind due to language concerns.

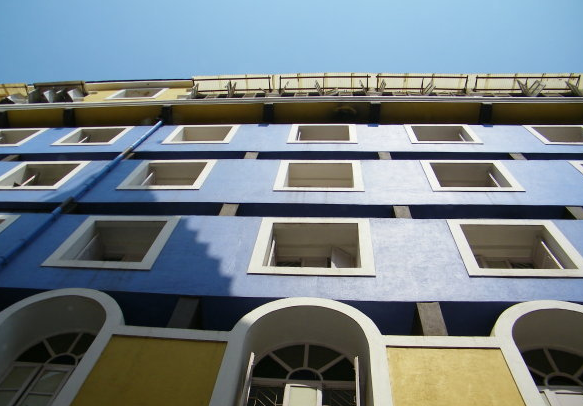
The Mushtifund Saunstha Main School Building

=== Mushtifund High School ===
Mushtifund High School is the largest section of Mushtifund Saunstha. It includes grades 5 to 10, the common high school levels in the Education system in India. The high school section now has more than 20 classes with more than 600 students enrolled.

Mushtifund High School was primarily based in the institution's main building in the capital city of Panjim. As of the academic year of 2016-2017, the school will be shifting its premises to the newly built multi-school complex at Cujira, Bambolim.

The school is affiliated to the Goa Board of Secondary and Higher Secondary Education, and follows a NCERT pattern.

==== Transportation ====
The school provides school buses as a part of the "Bal Rath" scheme for students from far locations. This service is free for the students, with 3 buses being operated at the moment. This will increase as the school shifts to its new school complex at Cujira.

=== Mushtifund Higher Secondary School ===
The Mushtifund Higher Secondary School is a senior high school in the city of Panaji. It offers senior high school programs in two majors—science and commerce. Its science section has an admissions procedure that accepts only the cream of the student community. The school is among the reputed senior high schools in the state, and has a record of producing Board toppers in either discipline.

== Modernization ==
=== Next Education ===
The school has partnered with Next Education (smart learning services) in a bid to modernize the school's infrastructure. Each classroom has been accommodated with a digital virtual learning system, with projectors projecting a learning software developed by Next Education.

=== Cujira School Complex, Bambolim. ===
Starting of the academic year 2016-2017, the high school section will be shifting operations to the newly constructed Mushtifund building in Cujira, Bambolim. This building will be a part of the integrated multi-school complex, which was an initiative by the Government of Goa to provide new school premises to degrading schools.

Starting with High School, the HSS and Kindergarten sections will subsequently shift their operations in the coming years, once the building is fully functional.
