= Intraoperative radiation therapy =

- Other names: IORT
- Specialty: Oncology
- ICD-9-CM: 92.4

Intraoperative radiation therapy (IORT) is radiation therapy that is administered during surgery directly in the operating room (hence intraoperative).

Usually therapeutic levels of radiation are delivered to the tumor bed while the area is exposed during surgery. IORT is typically a component in the multidisciplinary treatment of locally advanced and recurrent cancer, in combination with external beam radiation, surgery, and chemotherapy. As a growing trend in recent years, IORT can also be used in earlier stage cancers such as prostate and breast cancer.

== Medical uses ==
IORT was found to be useful and feasible in the multidisciplinary management of many solid tumors but further studies are needed to determine the benefit more precisely. Single-institution experiences have suggested a role of IORT e.g. in brain tumors and cerebral metastases, locally advanced and recurrent rectal cancer, skin cancer, retroperitoneal sarcoma, pancreatic cancer, and selected gynaecologic and genitourinary malignancies. For local recurrences, irradiation with IORT is, besides brachytherapy, the only radiotherapeutic option if repeated EBRT is no longer possible. Generally, the normal tissue tolerance does not allow a second full-dose course of EBRT, even after years.

=== Breast cancer ===
On 25 July 2014, the UK National Institute for Health and Care Excellence (NICE) gave provisional recommendation for the use of TARGIT IORT with Intrabeam in the UK National Health Service. The 2015 update of guidelines of the Association of Gynecological Oncology (AGO), an autonomous community of the German Society of Gynecology and Obstetrics (DGGG) and the German Cancer Society includes TARGIT IORT during lumpectomy as a recommended option for women with a T1, Grade 1 or 2, ER positive breast cancer.

== Rationale ==
The rationale for IORT is to deliver a high dose of radiation precisely to the targeted area with minimal exposure of surrounding tissues which are displaced or shielded during the IORT. Conventional radiation techniques such as external beam radiotherapy (EBRT) following surgical removal of the tumor have several drawbacks: The tumor bed where the highest dose should be applied is frequently missed due to the complex localization of the wound cavity even when modern radiotherapy planning is used. Additionally, the usual delay between the surgical removal of the tumor and EBRT may allow a repopulation of the tumor cells. These potentially harmful effects can be avoided by delivering the radiation more precisely to the targeted tissues leading to immediate sterilization of residual tumor cells. Another aspect is that wound fluid has a stimulating effect on tumor cells. IORT was found to inhibit the stimulating effects of wound fluid.

== Methods ==
Several methods are used to deliver IORT. IORT can be delivered using electron beams (electron IORT), orthovoltage (250–300 kV) X-rays (X-ray IORT), high-dose-rate brachytherapy (HDR-IORT), or low-energy (50 kV) x-rays (low-energy IORT).

=== Electron IORT ===
While IORT was first used in clinical practice in 1905, the modern era of IORT began with the introduction of electron IORT in the mid-1960s by transporting patients from the OR after the tumor was removed to the radiation department to receive their electron IORT. Electron IORT has the advantages of being able to carefully control the depth of radiation penetration while providing a very uniform dose to the tumor bed. Applied with energies in the range of 3 MeV to 12 MeV, electron IORT can treat to depths of up to 4 cm over areas as large as 300 cm² (i.e. a 10 cm diameter circle) and takes only 1–3 minutes to deliver the prescribed radiation dose. A few hospitals built shielded operation rooms in which a conventional linear accelerator was installed to deliver the IORT radiation. This eliminated the complex logistics involved with patient transportation, but was so costly that only a few hospitals were able to use this approach. The breakthrough came in 1997, with the introduction of a miniaturized, self-shielded, mobile linear accelerator (Mobetron, IntraOp Corporation, US) and a mobile but unshielded linear accelerator (Novac, Liac–SIT, Italy). More than 75,000 patients have been treated with electron IORT, almost half of them since the introduction of mobile electron IORT technology.

=== X-ray IORT ===
Early practitioners of IORT treated primarily abdominal malignancies using superficial X-rays (75–125 kV) and later orthovoltage x-rays (up to 300 kV in energy) prior to the advent of technology that enabled high-energy electrons. For the first 75 years, X-ray IORT was used mostly for palliation, but there were a few anecdotal reports of long-term survivors. In the early 1980s, when the use of electron IORT was increasing and showed promising results for certain indications, a handful of hospitals installed othovoltage units in lightly shielded ORs to see if this lower cost approach could achieve comparable results to that of electron IORT. This approach was less costly than building a shielded OR for an electron IORT unit and eliminated the logistics involved with patient transportation. However, it had a number of problems that limited its appeal. X-ray IORT has a poor uniformity of dose as a function of depth of penetration, the radiation does not stop at a pre-defined depth but continues to deposit radiation to underlying structures, and can do damage to boney structures if too high a dose is delivered. Despite its long use (since the 1930s), fewer than 1000 patients have been treated with this approach, and it is no longer offered at most centers.

=== HDR-IORT ===
This technique was developed in the late 1980s in an attempt to combine the dosimetric advantages of high-dose rate brachytherapy with the challenges of treating some complex anatomic surfaces with IORT. It has the advantage of being lower cost than dedicated electron IORT systems, since many radiation centers already have an HDR system that can be transported to the OR when HDR-IORT is needed. HDR-IORT can also treat very large and convoluted surfaces. However, it does require a shielded OR or a shielded room in the OR complex to deliver the HDR-IORT. The depth of penetration is very limited, typically either ½ cm to 1 cm depth, sometimes requiring extensive surgery due to the limited penetration of the radiation. Treatments tend to be 40 minutes or longer, resulting in greater OR time, more anesthesia and greater blood loss when compared to electron IORT. There are about 10 to 20 active centers using HDR-IORT for locally advanced and recurrent disease, and approximately 2000 patients have received this treatment, mostly for colorectal cancer, head and neck cancer, and gynecologic cancer.

=== Low-energy IORT (50 kV) ===
Intrabeam, (Carl Zeiss AG, Germany) received FDA and CE approval in 1999 and is a miniature mobile X-ray source which emits low-energy X-ray radiation (max. 50 kV) in isotropic distribution. Due to the higher ionization density caused by soft X-ray radiation in the tissue, the relative biological effectiveness (RBE) of low-energy X-rays on tumor cells is higher when compared to high-energy X-rays or gamma rays which are delivered by linear accelerators. The radiation which is produced by low-energy mobile radiation systems has a limited range. For this reason, conventional walls are regarded sufficient to stop the radiation scatter produced in the operating room and no extra measures for radiation protection are necessary. This makes IORT accessible for more hospitals. Targeted intra-operative radiotherapy is a low-energy IORT technique. Evaluation of the long-term outcomes in patients who were treated with TARGIT-IORT for breast cancer confirmed that it is as effective as whole breast external beam radiotherapy in controlling cancer, and also reduces deaths from other causes as shown in a large international randomised clinical trial published in the British Medical Journal.

== See also ==
- Brachytherapy
- External beam radiotherapy (EBRT)
- Intraoperative electron radiation therapy (IOERT)
- Targeted intra-operative radiotherapy (TARGIT-IORT)
