= Targeted intra-operative radiotherapy =

Method of targeted radiotherapy after surgical removal of tumours

- The equipment and process of TARGIT intra-operative radiotherapy
- Other names: TARGIT
- Specialty: Oncology

Targeted intra-operative radiotherapy, also known as targeted IORT, is a technique of giving radiotherapy to the tissues surrounding a cancer after its surgical removal, a form of intraoperative radiation therapy. The technique was designed in 1998 at the University College London.

One IORT technique is known as TARGIT (TARGeted Intraoperative radioTherapy). TARGIT is a method where the radiation is applied during an operation and targeted to the peri-tumoural tissues. TARGIT technique was designed at University College London by Jayant S. Vaidya (who coined the TARGIT acronym) and Michael Baum along with Jeffrey S. Tobias in 1998. The term was first used when the technique was described.

== Medical uses ==
=== Breast cancer ===
The largest experience with IORT using the TARGIT technique and the best evidence for its potentials exists in breast cancer where a substantial number of patients have already been treated. In patients having lumpectomy for breast cancer, the TARGIT-A(lone) randomized controlled trial (recruitment from 2000–2012) tested whether TARGIT within a risk-adapted approach is non-inferior to conventional course of external beam postoperative radiotherapy given over several weeks.

==== Adoption ====
On 25 July 2014 the UK National Institute for Health and Care Excellence (NICE) gave provisional recommendation for the use of TARGIT IORT with Intrabeam in the UK National Health Service. In September 2014, NICE requested further information from the clinical trial investigators, citing several comments and concerns. Concerns cited included the immaturity of the data with a median follow up of the entire population being only two years and five months, as well as the noninferiority criterion used in the study. This extra information was supplied by the authors, and has since been published as part of the comprehensive paper on TARGIT-A trial. In 2017, NICE described it as an option for early breast cancer.

The 2015 update of guidelines of the Association of Gynaecological Oncology (AGO) (an autonomous community of the German Society of Gynaecology and Obstetrics (DGGG) and the German Cancer Society) includes TARGIT IORT during lumpectomy as a recommended option for women with a T1, Grade 1 or 2, ER positive breast cancer.

On 21 May 2015, the Australian Government Medical Services Advisory Committee (MSAC) announced that "After considering the available evidence in relation to safety, clinical effectiveness and cost-effectiveness, MSAC supported public funding of a new Medicare Benefits Schedule (MBS) item for treatment of pathologically documented invasive ductal breast cancer in eligible patients with TARGIT-IORT when used concurrently with breast-conserving surgery". The Australian Government also approved budget item for the treatment of early stage breast cancer using targeted intraoperative radiotherapy and patients can avail of this treatment from 1 September 2015.

On 26 May 2015, in response to a query by the British Medical Journal, NICE clarified that while their appraisal is going on, TARGIT IORT with Intrabeam can continue to be offered to patients who need it.

About 260 centres in over 35 countries including North America (about 80 centres), South America, Europe (e.g., 60 centres in Germany), Australia, Middle East (e.g., 9 centres in Israel), and the Far East are currently using TARGIT IORT for breast cancer treatment, and over 45,000 patients have so far been treated using TARGIT IORT.

Evaluation of the long-term outcomes from an open-label randomised controlled trial (TARGIT-A) published in 2020, demonstrated that TARGIT-IORT is as effective as whole breast external beam radiotherapy in controlling cancer for patients with breast cancer. The results also suggested deaths from other causes such as cardiovascular or lung problems or from other cancers were reduced over a 12-year follow up.

A systematic review of partial breast irradiation (PBI) techniques (including TARGIT) versus whole breast radiotherapy, by Cochrane, found current evidence shows PBI provides slightly worse cancer control. A meta-analysis by authors of the TRAGIT-A trial found that PBI reduced non-breast cancer and overall mortality compared with whole breast radiation.

== Rationale ==
When breast cancer is surgically excised, it can come back (local recurrence) in the remaining breast or on the chest wall in a small proportion of women. Adjuvant radiotherapy is necessary if breast cancer is treated by removing only the cancerous lump with a rim of surrounding normal tissue, as it reduces the chance of local recurrence. When cancer does come back, it most commonly occurs in the tissues surrounding the original cancer (the tumour bed), even though there are multicentric cancers in remote areas of the breast. This suggests that it is most important to treat the tumour bed.

The rationale for TARGIT is to deliver a high dose of radiation precisely to the tumour bed. Conventional radiation techniques such as external beam radiotherapy (EBRT) following surgical removal of the tumour have been time tested and proven to be effective. EBRT is usually given as a course of whole breast radiotherapy and an additional tumour bed boost, or partial breast irradiation of a smaller area. However, it has a few drawbacks; for example, the tumour bed where the boost dose should be applied can be missed due to the difficulties in localization of the complex wound cavity ("geographical miss"), even when modern radiotherapy planning is used. Additionally, the usual delay between the surgical removal of the tumour and EBRT may allow a repopulation of the tumour cells ("temporal miss"). These potentially harmful effects may be avoided by delivering the radiation more precisely to the targeted tissues leading to immediate sterilization of residual tumour cells. The use in TARGIT of a small treatment device which can be positioned in close physical proximity to the treatment site aims to avoid some of these practical issues. TARGIT irradiation has also been shown to affect the properties of wound fluid, which may be linked to cancer cell proliferation and possibly local recurrence. Based on results from the TARGIT-A trial it has been hypothesised that TARGIT may have an abscopal effect reducing the risk of non-cancer death, although this is not proven.

== Technique ==
The Intrabeam system, manufactured by Carl Zeiss AG, is used for TARGIT. It is a miniature and mobile X-ray source which emits low energy X-ray radiation (max. 50 kV) in isotropic distribution. Due to the higher ionisation density caused by soft X-ray radiation in the tissue, the relative biological effectiveness (RBE) of low-energy X-rays on tumour cells is higher when compared to high-energy X-rays or gamma rays which are delivered by linear accelerators. Lower energy radiation such as this has a limited range, and therefore conventional walls may be sufficient to stop the radiation scatter produced in the operating room without extra measures for radiation protection.

== Professional society ==
In 1998, the International Society of IORT (ISIORT) was formed to foster the scientific and clinical development of IORT. The ISIORT has more than 1000 members worldwide and meets every two years.

== See also ==
- Brachytherapy
- Breast cancer treatment
- Intraoperative electron radiation therapy (IOERT)
- Radiation therapy
