= Abscopal effect =

Hypothesis in the treatment of metastatic cancer

Proposed mechanism of the abscopal effect, mediated by the immune system. Here, local radiation causes tumor cell death, which is followed by adaptive immune system recognition, not unlike a vaccine.

The abscopal effect is a hypothesis in the treatment of metastatic cancer whereby shrinkage of untreated tumors occurs concurrently with shrinkage of tumors within the scope of the localized treatment. Robin H. Mole (1914–1992) proposed the term abscopal ('ab' - away from, 'scopus' - target) in 1953 to refer to effects of ionizing radiation "at a distance from the irradiated volume but within the same organism".

Initially associated with single-tumor, localized radiation therapy, the term abscopal effect has also come to encompass other types of localized treatments such as electroporation and intra-tumoral injection of therapeutics. However, the term only properly applies when truly local treatments result in systemic effects. For instance, chemotherapeutics commonly circulate through the blood stream and therefore exclude the possibility of any abscopal response.

The mediators of the abscopal effect of radiotherapy were unknown for decades. In 2004, it was postulated for the first time that the immune system might be responsible for these "off-target" anti-tumor effects. Various studies in animal models of melanoma, mammary, and colorectal tumors have substantiated this hypothesis. Abscopal effects of Targeted intraoperative radiotherapy have been seen in clinical studies, including in randomized trials where women treated with lumpectomy for breast cancer combined with whole breast radiotherapy showed reduced mortality from non-breast-cancer causes when compared with whole breast radiotherapy. Furthermore, immune-mediated abscopal effects were also described in patients with metastatic cancer. Whereas these reports were extremely rare throughout the 20th century, the clinical use of immune checkpoint blocking antibodies such as ipilimumab or pembrolizumab has greatly increased the number of abscopally responding patients in selected groups of patients such as those with metastatic melanoma or lymphoma.

== Mechanisms ==
Similar to immune reactions against antigens from bacteria or viruses, the abscopal effect requires priming of immune cells against tumor antigens. Local irradiation of a tumor nodule may lead to immunogenic forms of tumor cell death and liberation of tumor cell-derived antigens. These antigens can be recognized and processed by antigen-presenting cells within the tumor (dendritic cells and macrophages). Cytotoxic T cells which recognize these tumor antigens may in turn be primed by the tumor antigen-presenting cells. In contrast to the local effect of irradiation on the tumor cells, these cytotoxic T cells circulate through the blood stream and are thus able to destroy remaining tumor cells in distant parts of the body which were not irradiated. Accordingly, increases in tumor-specific cytotoxic T cells were shown to correlate with abscopal anti-tumor responses in patients. Vice versa, the abscopal effect is abolished after experimental depletion of T cells in various animal models.

Abscopal effects of ionizing radiation are often blocked by the immunosuppressive microenvironment inside the irradiated tumor which prevents effective T cell priming. This explains why the effect is so rarely seen in patients receiving radiotherapy alone. In contrast, the combination of immunomodulatory drugs such as ipilimumab and pembrolizumab can partially reconstitute systemic anti-tumor immune reactions induced after local tumor radiotherapy. The optimal combination of radiation dose and fractionation with immunomodulatory drugs is currently under intensive investigation. In this context, it was proposed that radiation doses above 10 to 12 Gray might be ineffective in inducing immunogenic forms of cell death. The volume of tissue irradiated may also influence the likelihood of an abscopal response, as conventional treatment fields commonly encompass the tumor-draining lymph nodes and a substantial fraction of circulating lymphocytes, both of which are required for T cell priming. However, there is so far no consensus on the optimal radiation regimen needed to increase the chance of abscopal tumor regression.
