= Netravali =

- Village
- Location in Goa, India Netravali (India)
- Coordinates: 15.09°N 74.22°E
- Country: India
- State: Goa
- District: Kushavati district

Languages
  - Official: Konkani
- Time zone: UTC+5:30 (IST)
- Vehicle registration: GA
- Website: goa.gov.in

Netravali is a census town in Sanguem taluka, Kushavati district in the state of Goa, India.

== Netravali Wildlife Sanctuary ==
Netravali Wildlife Sanctuary is located in South-Eastern Goa, India. It constitutes one of the vital corridors of the Western Ghats and covers an area of about 211km^{2}. Netravali or Neturli is an important tributary of River Zuari, which originates in the sanctuary. Forests mostly consist of moist deciduous vegetation interspersed with evergreen and semi-evergreen habitat; there are also two all-season waterfalls in the sanctuary.

== Geography ==
There are two waterfalls located in Netravali, those being Savari and Mainapi.

== See also ==
- Netravali Wildlife Sanctuary
