= Adil Shah Palace =

Heritage building in Goa, India

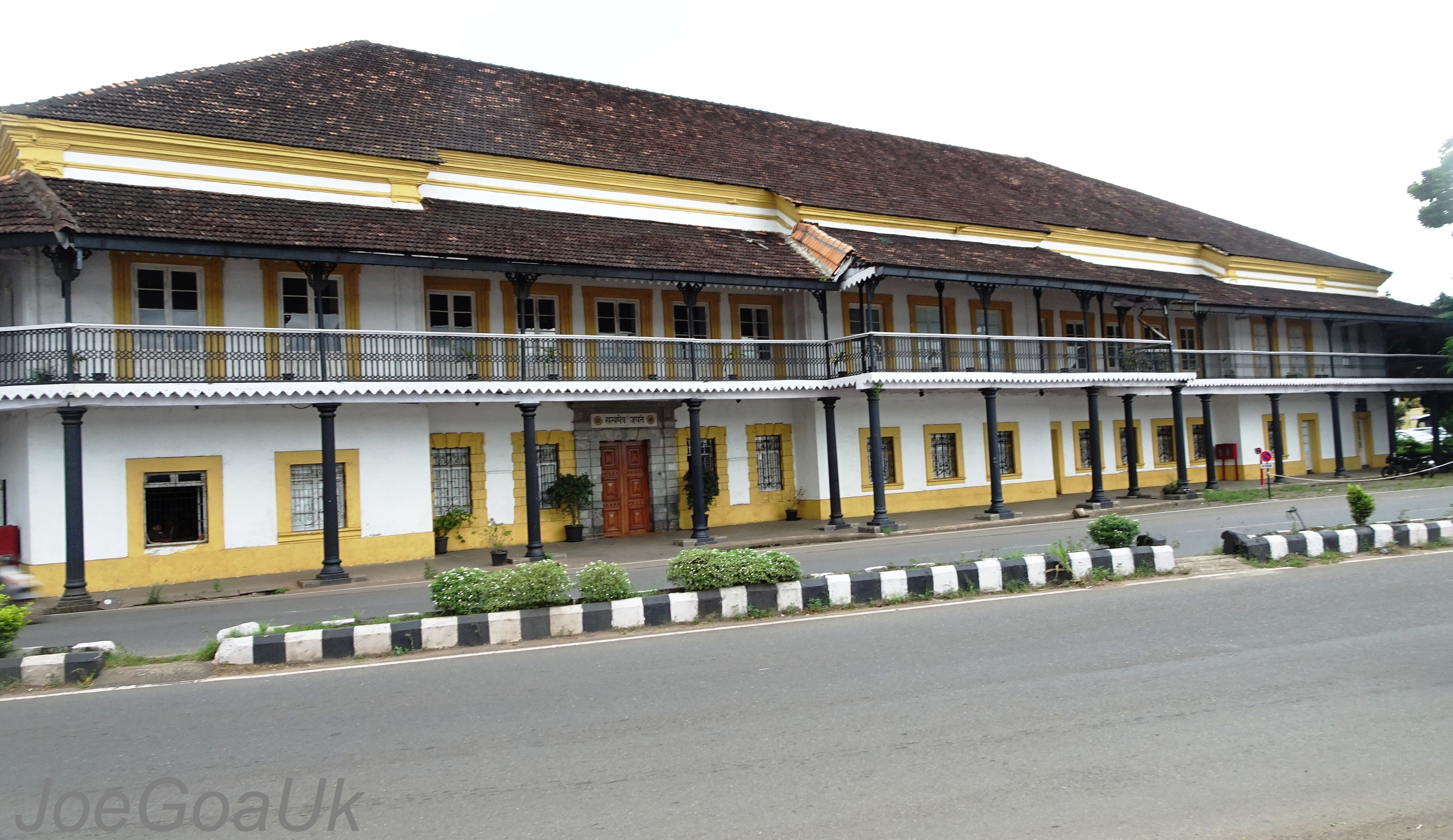
- Front of the Adil Shah Palace
- Interactive map of the Adil Shah Palace area

General information
- Location: Panjim, Goa, India
- Coordinates: 15°30′03″N 73°49′48″E
- Year built: 1500s

Technical details
- Floor count: 2

Adil Shah Palace, also known as the Idalcão Palace or the Old Secretariat, is a historic landmark located in Panaji, Goa. It is the oldest surviving colonial-era building in the city. Originally built as a summer palace for the ruler of the Adil Shahi dynasty, it has served various administrative roles under Portuguese and Indian governance over five centuries.

== History ==
=== Adil Sahi dynasty and Portuguese era ===
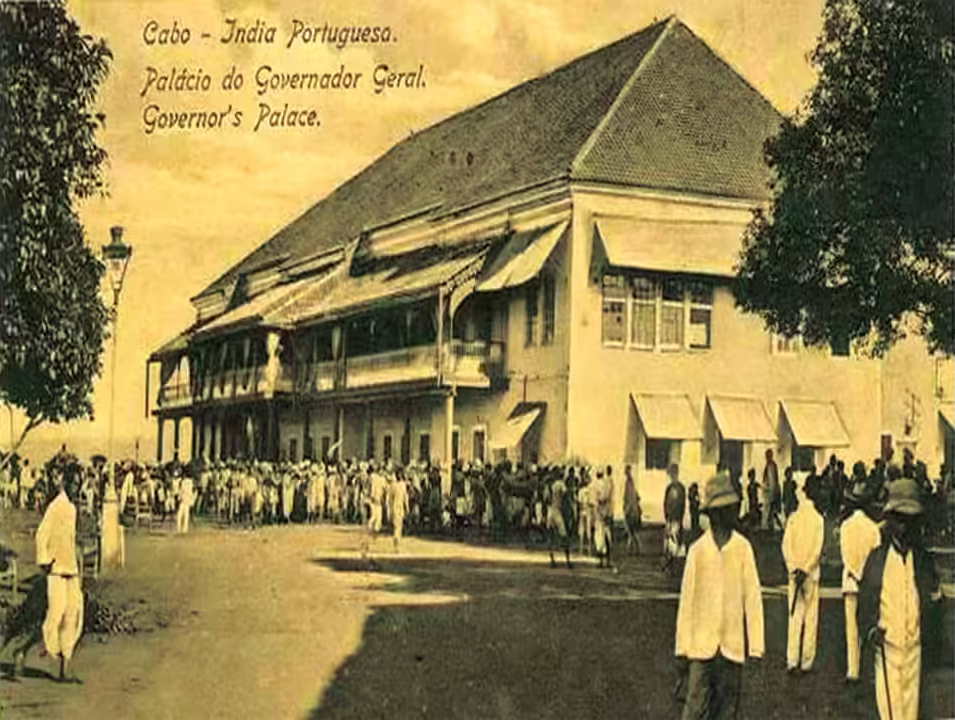
Adil Shah Palace, c. 1930s

The palace was constructed around 1500 by Yusuf Adil Shah of the Bijapur Sultanate (called Hidalcão by the Portuguese) to serve as his summer residence. It was strategically fortified with numerous cannons to defend the mouth of the Mandovi River. In 1510, the Portuguese Empire captured the structure after defeating the Bijapur forces.

Following the conquest, the Portuguese modified the building significantly around 1615. It initially served as a residence for the Viceroys when they stayed in Panaji, which was then a small village. In 1759, the residence of the Viceroy was officially shifted from Old Goa to this palace as the former capital suffered from epidemics. It continued to serve as the official seat of the Portuguese government in Goa until 1918, after which the governors moved to Cabo Raj Bhavan.

=== Post-Liberation ===
After the annexation of Goa by India in 1961, the building became the site of the first session of the Goa Legislative Assembly in 1963. It functioned as the Goa State Secretariat and the legislative assembly until the early 21st century, when these offices were moved to a new complex in Porvorim.

== Architecture ==
The building is a two-story structure characterized by its white-washed exterior and large windows. Its design reflects a blend of local and colonial architectural influences, though little remains of the original Adil Shahi "palace" aesthetic due to numerous Portuguese renovations.

== Current status ==
In recent years, the palace has been repurposed as a cultural center. It has hosted various exhibitions, including the Serendipity Arts Festival, and housed the Goa State Museum. Plans for a major restoration project were initiated in 2024 to address structural issues such as roof leaks and timber decay, with the aim of preserving the site as a premier heritage landmark.
