= Intraoperative electron radiation therapy =

Radiation therapy for Cancer

- Other names: IOERT
- ICD-9-CM: 92.41

Intraoperative electron radiation therapy is the application of electron radiation directly to the residual tumor or tumor bed during cancer surgery. Electron beams are useful for intraoperative radiation treatment because, depending on the electron energy, the dose falls off rapidly behind the target site, therefore sparing underlying healthy tissue.

IOERT has been called "precision radiotherapy," because the physician has direct visualization of the tumor and can exclude normal tissue from the field while protecting critical structures within the field and underlying the target volume. One advantage of IOERT is that it can be given at the time of surgery when microscopic residual tumor cells are most vulnerable to destruction. Also, IOERT is often used in combination with external beam radiotherapy (EBR) because it results in less integral doses and shorter treatment times.

== Medical uses ==
IOERT has a long history of clinical applications, with promising results, in the management of solid tumors (e.g., pancreatic cancer, locally advanced and recurrent rectal cancer, breast tumors, sarcomas, and selected gynaecologic and genitourinary malignancies, neuroblastomas and brain tumors. In virtually every tumor site, electron IORT improves local control, reducing the need for additional surgeries or interventions. The following is a list of disease sites currently treated by IOERT:

=== Breast cancer ===
Since 1975, breast cancer rates have declined in the U.S., largely due to mammograms and the use of adjuvant treatments such as radiotherapy. Local recurrence rates are greatly reduced by postoperative radiotherapy, which translates into improved survival: Preventing four local recurrences can prevent one breast cancer death. In one of the largest published studies so far called (ELIOT), researchers found that after treating 574 patients with full-dose IOERT with 21 Gy, at a median follow-up of 20 months, there was an in-breast tumor recurrence rate of only 1.05%. Other studies show that IOERT provides acceptable results when treating breast cancer in low-risk patients. More research is needed for defining the optimal dose of IOERT, alone or in combination with EBRT, and for determining when it may be appropriate to use it as part of the treatment for higher risk patients.

=== Colorectal cancer ===
Over the past 30 years, treatment of locally advanced colorectal cancer has evolved, particularly in the area of local control – stopping the spread of cancer from the tumor site. IOERT shows promising results. When combined with preoperative external beam irradiation plus chemotherapy and maximal surgical resection, it may be a successful component in the treatment of high-risk patients with locally advanced primary or locally recurrent cancers.

=== Gynecological cancer ===
Studies suggest that electron IORT may play an important and useful role in the treatment of patients with locally advanced and recurrent gynecologic cancers, especially for patients with locally recurrent cancer after treatment for their primary lesion. Further research into radiation doses and how to best combine IOERT with other interventions will help to define the sequencing of treatment and the patients who would most benefit from receiving electron IORT, as part of the multimodality treatment of this disease.

=== Head and neck cancer ===
Head and neck cancers are often difficult to treat and have a high rate of recurrence or metastasis. IOERT is an effective means of treating locally advanced or recurrent head and neck cancers. Furthermore, research shows that a boost given by IOERT reduces the ability for surviving tumor cells to replicate, creating extra time for healing of the surgical wound before EBRT is administered.

=== Pancreatic cancer ===
In the U.S., pancreatic cancer is the fourth leading cause of cancer death, even though there has been a slight improvement in mortality rates in recent years. Although the optimal treatment plan remains debated, a combination of radiotherapy and chemotherapy is favored in the U.S. As part of a multimodality treatment, IOERT appears to reduce local recurrence when combined with EBRT, chemoradiation, and surgical resection.

=== Soft tissue sarcomas ===
Soft tissue sarcomas can be effectively treated by electron IORT, which appears to be gaining acceptance as the current practice for sarcomas in combination with EBRT (preferably preoperative) and maximal resection. Used together, IOERT and EBRT appear to be improving local control, and this method is being refined so that it can effectively be used in combination with other interventions if indicated. In studies regarding the delivery of therapeutic radiation in the limb-sparing approach to extremity soft tissue sarcomas, electron IORT has been called ‘precision radiotherapy’ by some, because the treating physician has direct visualization of the tumor or surgical cavity and can manually exclude normal tissue from the field.

== History ==
Spanish and German doctors, in 1905 and 1915 respectively, used intraoperative radiation therapy (IORT) in an attempt to eradicate residual tumors left behind after surgical resection. However, radiation equipment in the early twentieth-century could only deliver low energy X-rays, which had relatively poor penetration; high doses of radiation could not be applied externally without doing unacceptable damage to normal tissues. IORT treatments with low energy or "orthovoltage" X-rays gained advocates throughout the 1930s and 1940s, but the results were inconsistent. The X-rays penetrated beyond the tumor bed to the normal tissues beneath, had poor dose distributions, and took a relatively long time to administer. The technique was largely abandoned in the late 1950s with the advent of megavoltage radiation equipment, which enabled the delivery of more penetrating external radiation.

In 1965, the modern era of IOERT began in Japan at Kyoto University where patients were treated with electrons generated by a betatron Compared with other forms of IORT such as orthovoltage X-ray beams, electron beams improved IOERT dose distributions, limited penetration beyond the tumor, and delivered the required dose much more rapidly. Normal tissue beneath the tumor bed could be protected and shielded, if required, and the treatment took only a few minutes to deliver. These advantages made electrons the preferred radiation for IOERT. The technique gained favor in Japan. Other Japanese hospitals initiated IOERT using electron beams, principally generated from linear particle accelerators. At most institutions, patients were operated on in the operating room (OR) and were transported to the radiation facility for treatment.

With the Japanese IOERT technique, relatively large single doses of radiation were administered during surgery, and most patients received no follow-up external radiation treatment. Even though this reduced the overall dose that could potentially be delivered to the tumor site, the early Japanese results were impressive, particularly for gastric cancer.

The Japanese experience was encouraging enough for several U.S. centers to institute IOERT programs. The first one began at Howard University in 1976 and followed the Japanese protocol of a large, single dose. Howard built a standard radiation therapy facility with one room that could be used as an OR as well as for conventional treatment. Because the radiation equipment was also used for conventional therapy, the competition for the machine limited the number of patients that could be scheduled for IOERT.

In 1978, Massachusetts General Hospital (MGH) started an IORT program. The MGH doctors scheduled one of their conventional therapy rooms for IOERT one afternoon a week, performed surgery in the OR, and transported the patient to the radiation therapy room during surgery. This used the radiation equipment more efficiently and required no additional capital outlay. However, about 30-50% of the patients planned for IOERT were found to be unsuitable candidates for IORT at the time of surgery, mainly because the disease had spread to adjacent organs. This factor, combined with the risks and complexities of moving a patient during surgery, severely limited the number of patients who could be treated using the MGH method of IOERT. Consequently, conventional fractionated external beam irradiation was added to the IOERT dose, either prior to or subsequent to the surgery, in the MGH IOERT program.

The National Cancer Institute (NCI) started an IOERT program in 1979. Their approach combined maximal surgical resection and IOERT and, in most cases, did not include conventional external beam therapy as part of the treatment. Because the NCI protocol relied on IOERT radiation alone, the IOERT fields were often very large, sometimes requiring two or three adjacent and overlapping fields to cover the tumor site. While the NCI results for these very large tumors were not encouraging, they showed that even the combination of aggressive surgery and large IOERT fields had acceptable toxicity. Furthermore, they introduced several technical innovations to IOERT, including the use of television for simultaneous periscopic viewing of the tumor by the surgical team.

In 1981 the Mayo Clinic tried yet another arrangement. They built an OR adjacent to the radiation therapy department. Potential IOERT patients underwent surgery in the regular OR suite. If they were found to be candidates for IOERT, a second surgical procedure was scheduled in the OR adjacent to the radiation facility. By scheduling only those patients known to be suitable for IOERT, they made more efficient use of their radiation therapy machine, but at the cost of subjecting patients to a second surgery. Subsequently, the Mayo Clinic remodeled an OR and installed a conventional radiation therapy machine with its required massive shield walls, and the clinic now routinely treats over 100 IORT patients per year. After 1985, Siemens Medical Systems offered a specialized LINAC for IOERT. It was designed to be used in the OR, but it weighed more than eight tons and required about 100 tons of shielding. This proved to be too expensive an approach for the medical community, and only seven of these specialized units were ever sold.

Dedicating an OR to IOERT increases the number of patients that can be treated and eliminates the risks of double surgeries and moving a patient during surgery. It also eliminates the complex logistics involved in moving patients from the OR to the therapy room and back to the OR. However, this solution has its own disadvantages: Remodeling an OR and purchasing an accelerator is expensive. Moreover, IORT is restricted to that one, specialized OR. Even so, the Mayo Clinic model demonstrated that when therapy equipment is located within an OR, the number of IOERT procedures will increase. In 1985, IOERT began in Italy and involved a specialized method to facilitate surgery followed by transport to the radiotherapy treatment room. Around the same time in France, another IOERT method was developed using the Lyon intra-operative device.

In 1982 the Joint Center for Radiation Therapy (JCRT), at Harvard Medical School, attempted to reduce the cost of performing IORT in an OR by using orthovoltage X-rays to provide the intraoperative dose, which was similar to the approach used in Germany in 1915. But this was less than ideal. While the shielding costs and the cost and weight of the equipment compared favorably with conventional electron accelerators, dose distributions were inferior; treatment times were longer; and bones received a higher radiation dose. For these reasons, the centers rejected IO orthovoltage (X-rays) radiation therapy machines. In addition, these orthovoltage machines (300 kvp) were not designed to be mobile.

=== Advent of Portable Linear Accelerators ===
In the 1990s, electron IORT experienced resurgence, due to the development of mobile linear accelerators that used electron beams—the Mobetron, LIAC, and NOVAC-7 -- and the increasing use of IOERT to treat breast cancer. Prior to the invention of portable LINACs for IOERT, clinicians could only treat IORT patients in specially shielded operating rooms, which were expensive to build, or in a radiotherapy room, which required transporting the anesthetized patient from the OR to the LINAC for treatment. These factors were major obstructions to the widespread adoption of IORT because they added significant cost to treatment as well as logistical complications to surgery, including an increased risk of infection to the patient.

Because portable LINACs for IOERT produced electron beams of energy less than or equal to 12 MeV and did not use bending magnets, the secondary radiation emitted was so low that it didn’t require permanent shielding in the operating room. This greatly reduced the cost of either constructing a new OR or retrofitting an old one. By using mobile units, the possibility of treating patients with IORT was no longer restricted to the availability of special shielded operating rooms, but could be done in regular unshielded ORs.

Currently, the Mobetron, LIAC, and NOVAC-7 linear accelerators are improving patient care by delivering intraoperative radiation electron beam therapy to cancer patients during surgery. All three units are compact and mobile. Invented in the U.S. in 1997, the Mobetron uses X-band technology and a soft docking system. The LIAC and NOVAC-7 are robotic devices developed in Italy that use S-band technology and a hard-docking system. The NOVAC-7 became available for clinical use in the 1990s while the LIAC was introduced to a clinical environment in 2003.

Other non-IOERT mobile units have been developed as well. In 1998, a technique called TARGIT (targeted intraoperative radio therapy) was designed at the University College London for treating the tumor bed after wide local excision (lumpectomy) of breast cancer. TARGIT uses a miniature and mobile X-ray source that emits low energy X-ray radiation (max. 50 kV) in isotropic distribution. (IO)-brachytherapy with MammoSite is also used to treat breast cancer.

Interest in this treatment technique is growing, due in part to the development of LINAC for IOERT by factories.

== See also ==
- External beam radiotherapy (EBRT)
- Intraoperative radiation therapy (IORT)
- Targeted intraoperative radiotherapy (TARGIT)
