= Dada Vaidya =

Ayurvedic practitioner (1859–1947)

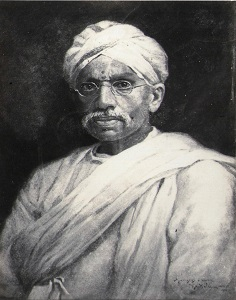
- Portrait of Vaidya
- Born: 8 September 1859; Keri, Goa, Portuguese India
- Died: 6 March 1947 (aged 87)

Ramchandra Pandurang Vaidya (8 September 1859 – 6 March 1947), better known as Dada Vaidya, was an ayurvedic practitioner, writer, social reformer and educator. He is known for his contributions in the fields of medicine, literature, education, industry and culture. A statue in his honour stands at Ponda, Goa, at a location known today as Dada Vaidya Chowk.

He used to extract medicines from various plants in Goa and administer them to ailing persons. Though the Portuguese Government was advocating allopathic medicines by law, Vaidya had the privilege of Portuguese officers as he treated their family members who had lost hopes of curing by adopting allopathic medicines successfully.

== Early life ==
Vaidya was born on 8 September 1859 in Keri, Ponda, Goa. His family originally hailed from Panvel in Tiswadi, and their original surname was Wayangal. During the period of conversions in Goa, the family moved to Volvoi, Keri. They acquired the nickname Panvelkar, denoting their origin from Panvel, and Vaidya, derived from their hereditary involvement in the medical profession.

At an early age, Vaidya received instruction in Marathi and Sanskrit at home, as part of his Brahminical training. He was introduced to Ayurveda under the guidance of his father. Although he wished to study Western medicine, his family did not allow him to leave Goa. Instead, he trained for about two years under an allopathic doctor named Joglekar, and went on to achieve success as a physician. He became known as one of Goa’s leading medical practitioners and continued to practice into his sixties. He considered medicine not a business but a form of public service.

== Literary career ==
Vaidya was interested in reading from childhood and was influenced by newspapers and journals such as Kesari, Induprakash, Sudharak and Nibandhmala. At the age of 20, he began to write with the aim of contributing to the development of Goa. He used his personal funds to publish newspapers including Luz d'Oriente, Vidyaprasar, Pathya Bod and Prachiprabha. He also ran Halad Kunku, a magazine specifically for women.

His books include Kavyatarangini, Sthulatanu Varnan, Mrityunjaya Natak, Prabodhsudhakar (critique), Prakriti Vikriti (satire), Sphurangeetan, Atmabodha and Sukanyacharitra. His writings covered a range of genres and themes. One of his notable works was Kumpanane Shet Khanyachi Navalai (The Unprecedentedness of Progeny Regulation), which addressed family planning, a subject considered unconventional at the time. He wrote more poetry than prose, and a portion of his literary work remains unpublished.

== Social reform and education ==
Vaidya was active in efforts to revive Hindu society in Goa. He was associated with the Goa Hindu Sarvajin Sabha, which provided a platform for political and social discourse among Hindus. He expressed concern that Hindus in Goa had little representation in political affairs and lagged behind in Western education compared to Christians.

In 1911, Vaidya with Sitaram Kerkar and Vinayak Sarjyotishi founded the Goa Vidyaprasarak Mandal and its first institution, A.J. de Almeida High School, in the Pondà, Portuguese Goa. The institution operated under difficult conditions during Portuguese rule, relying on volunteers and community support. Vaidya also set up clinics for Ayurvedic medicines in Panaji and Margao, an Ayurvedic laboratory and a tile factory in Moira, and attempted to establish glass and sugar factories. These ventures were part of his vision for educational, economic and industrial development in Goa.

== Patronage of culture ==
At a time when participation in theatre was avoided by the elite, Vaidya sponsored a drama troupe at considerable personal expense. His contributions extended to the arts as well as to medicine, education, literature and industry. His work is therefore often described in terms of five broad areas: political, social, educational, industrial and cultural.

== Later life and death ==
In his later years, Vaidya adopted a life of renunciation and resided in a hut at Kavale Mansion in Ponda. He died there on 6 March 1947 at the age of 87. Shortly before his death, he created a trust dedicated to religion and education.

== Legacy ==
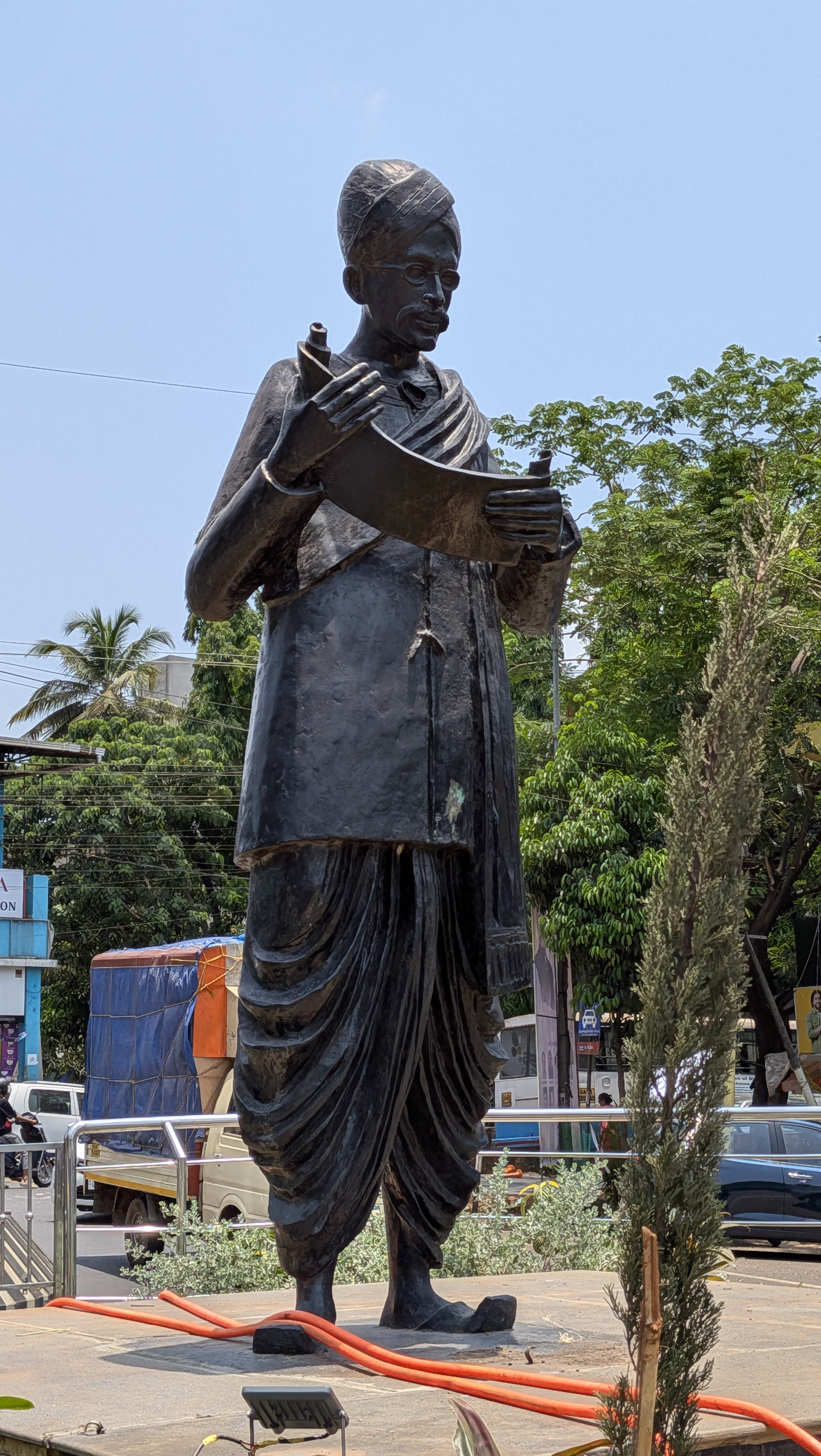
Dada Vaidya statue, Ponda

In recognition of his lifelong work, the Portuguese authorities erected a full-length statue of him in Ponda, where the square is known as Dada Vaidya Chowk.
