= Goa Vidyaprasarak Mandal =

- Dr. Dada Vaidya Sankul, Ponda Goa. 403401; Goa; India

Information
- Established: 1911
- Key people: Dada Vaidya, Sitaram Kerkar, Vinayak Sarjyotishi
- Website: gvmponda.com

Goa Vidyaprasarak Mandal, founded in 1911, is one of the prominent educational institutions in Goa, a small state on the west coast of India. It operates two senior colleges, including a college of education, one higher secondary school, five high schools and one kindergarten and primary school.

== History ==
Dr. Dada Vaidya, Sitaram Kerkar and Vinayak Sarjyotishi founded Goa Vidyaprasarak Mandal and its first institution, A.J. de Almeida High School, in the Ponda taluk of central Goa. The school was named after António José de Almeida, a Portuguese republican statesman during Portugal's rule in Goa.

During the campaign against Portuguese colonial rule, the Goa Vidyaprasarak Mandal and A.J. de Almeida High School were centres of nationalist activities and thus have a long list of freedom fighters as their alumni. The founders thought of imparting education for white-collared jobs and for upgrading the standards of the common man through vocational training.

After Portuguese rule ended in 1961, four more high schools were founded in Bandora, Savoi Verem, Borim and Khandepar between 1962 and 1965. All of these are villages in the Ponda region of Goa. In 1975, a primary and kindergarten school was started in Ponda and, with the introduction of 10+2+3 pattern of education (which involves ten years of schooling, followed by two years of 'higher secondary', and finally three more years in college before being awarded a Bachelor's degree), a higher secondary school was started in 1975 in Ponda.

In 1985, Goa University came into existence. During its amrit mahotsav (platinum jubilee) year, Goa Vidyaprasarak Mandal planned to start a senior college in Ponda, which became a reality on June 12, 1986 with the cooperation of Goa University, Goa Government authorities, well-wishers, teachers, members and students. On March 13, 1994 the college was named after late Gopal Govind Poy Raiturcar.
