= Churches and convents of Goa =

Indian World Heritage site

Churches and Convents of Goa
UNESCO World Heritage Site
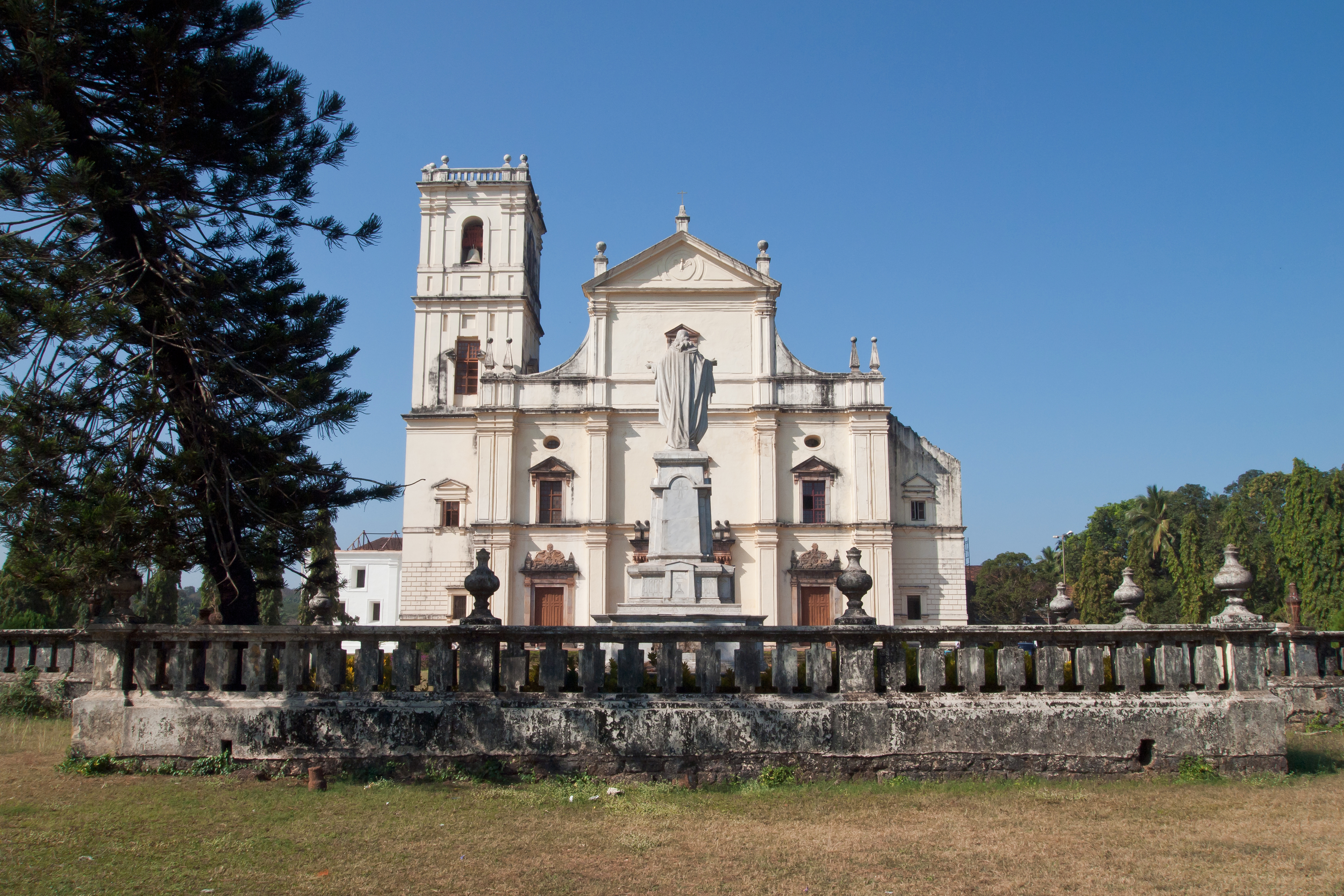
- Sé Cathedral holds the miraculous cross and is one of the largest cathedrals in Asia.

- Location within Goa Location within India Location within South Asia
- Location: Goa, India
- Criteria: Cultural: (ii), (iv), (vi)
- Reference: 234
- Inscription: 1986 (10th Session)
- Coordinates: 15°30′8″N 73°54′42″E

Churches and Convents of Goa is the name given by UNESCO to a set of religious monuments located in Goa Velha (or Old Goa), in the state of Goa, India, which were declared a World Heritage Site in 1986.

Goa was the capital of Portuguese India and Asia and an evangelization center from the 16th century. The justifications for the inclusion of religious monuments in Goa in the World Heritage List are: 1) the influence of the monuments in the dissemination of Western art forms—the Manueline styles, Mannerist and Baroque—throughout Asia where Catholic missions were established; 2) the value of the set of monuments of Goa as an exceptional example that illustrates the work of evangelization and 3) the specific value of presence in the Basilica of Bom Jesus of the tomb of Francisco Xavier, which illustrates a major world event: the influence of the Catholic religion in Asia in the modern era.

== History ==
The city of Goa was founded in the fifteenth century by the Muslim Sultanate of Bijapur as a port on the banks of the Mandovi river. The city was taken in 1510 by Afonso de Albuquerque with the help of the Goan Hindu privateer Timoja, remaining continuously under Portuguese rule until the twentieth century. The city was recorded as having over 200,000 inhabitants at its peak and was known by the title 'Rome of the East', specifically for its splendid and numerous Catholic religious buildings.

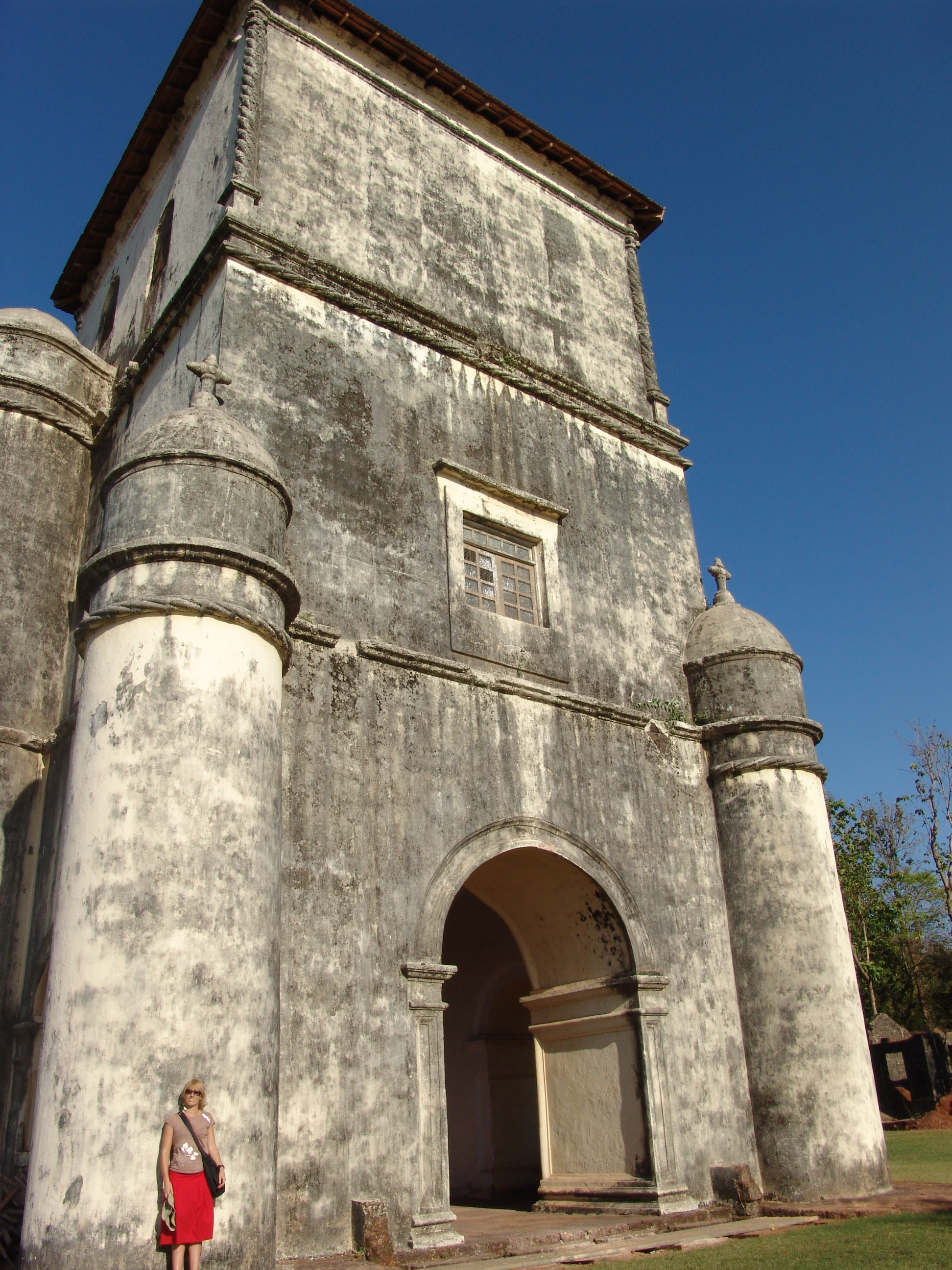
The Church of the Rosary built in late Manueline style, the oldest in Goa.

São Francisco Xavier, the Apóstolo do Oriente.

The first converts to Christianity in Goa were native Goan women who married Portuguese men that arrived with Afonso de Albuquerque during the Portuguese conquest of Goa in 1510. During the mid-16th century, the city of Goa, was the center of Christianization in the East. Jesuits, Franciscans, Dominicans and other Catholic religious orders settled in Goa from the sixteenth century. They used the city as their base for the spread of Catholicism in India. The sixteenth and seventeenth centuries were the Golden Age of Goa, which ran a flourishing trade and came to have administrative privileges similar to those of Lisbon.

In the first two centuries of the Portuguese presence most of the churches and monasteries were erected that still populate the city, earning the admiration of travelers who pass through Goa. These monuments reflect the cultural exchange and legacy of the Portuguese: while the architectural forms follow the European canon, the internal decoration of altars, altarpieces, paintings and furniture reflect the labour, the work of local artists. This was made possible by the presence of native Goan artists and labourers, which made it not necessary to import European artists or African slave labour (unlike in contemporary colonial Brazil).

From the late seventeenth century, trade competition with Dutch and British led to the economic decline of the city of Goa. Several epidemics ravaged the city and the river Mandovi became inadequate for the more modern ships. The Viceroy moved to Pangim (Nova Goa) in 1759, and Velha Goa lost its capital status officially in 1843.

The Republic of India invaded and annexed Goa in 1961, ending more than 451 years of continuous Portuguese rule. However, the cultural influence continues to this day and it is evident in the religious monuments of Goa, declared a world heritage site by UNESCO in 1986.

== Monuments ==
=== Igreja de Nossa Senhora do Rosário ===
The Church of Our Lady of the Rosary, built in 1543, is the oldest of the Old Goa churches still standing. Initially, it was a parish church, then collegial. On the outside, the church looks like a small fortress; the entrance porch flanked by small cylindrical towers with cupolas is typical of late-Gothic and Manueline Portugal, particularly in the Alentejo region. Inside, it highlights the Manueline vaults of the chapels. In the chancel, besides the altarpiece dedicated to Our Lady of the Rosary, there on the wall a carved alabaster cenotaph in Persian or Indian style, with the inscription: "Aqui jaz Dona Catarina, mulher de Garcia de Sa, a qual pede a quem isto ler que peça misericórida a Deus para sua alma" ("Here lies Dona Catarina, wife of Garcia de Sá, asks those who read this to asks mercy of God for the soul.") The floor below is the grave of Garcia de Sá (died in 1549), João de Castro's successor as Governor of India.

=== Sé Catedral of Goa ===
Goa was elevated to the seat of a bishopric in 1534 by Pope Paul III, and a towering cathedral church dedicated to Catherine of Alexandria was built in the first decades of colonization. This small church, insufficient to meet the faithful, was rebuilt from 1562, during the administration of Viceroy Dom Francisco Coutinho. The construction was extremely slow, since in 1619 only the body of the church was complete, with the missing facade completed in 1631.

The See of Goa is the largest building built by the Portuguese in Asia, 91 meters long and very wide, which probably contributed to the slow pace of works. The church has three naves of equal height, shaped hall-church, as do other Portuguese cathedrals of time as the Sees of Miranda do Douro (begun in 1552), Leiria (begun in 1559) and Portalegre (begun in 1556). The severe façade with three portals, has one tower: the right was destroyed during a storm in 1766. The church naves are vaulted and separated by two rows of pillars. Interior decoration stands out the magnificent altarpiece of the chancel in gilt.

=== Basilica of Bom Jesus ===
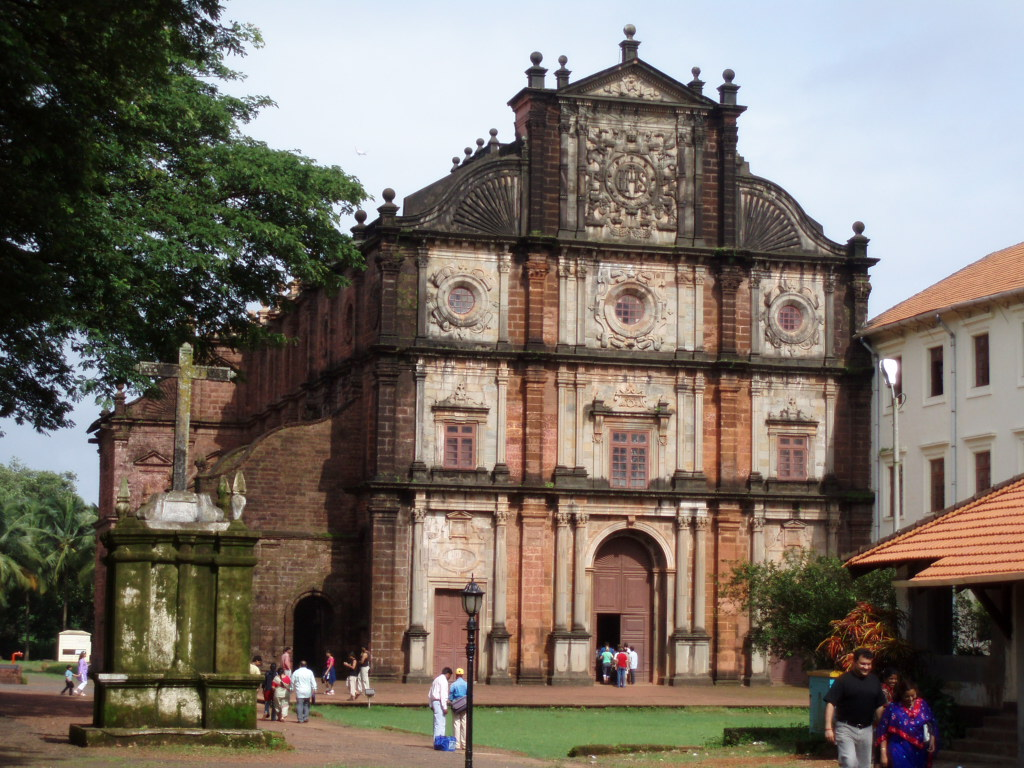
Basilica of Bom Jesus is a venerated Catholic site and preserves the remains of Saint Francis Xavier (São Francisco Xavier)

The Society of Jesus arrived in Goa in 1542, and its most important figure in these early days was the Francisco Xavier, considered the Apostle of the East for his work in the evangelization of Asia. Sometime after their arrival, the Jesuits created a religious education center, the College of St Paul or São Roque College, which had a huge library and press, but this complex was destroyed in 1830. The great Jesuit monument that survived is the Basilica of Bom Jesus, begun in 1594 and consecrated in 1605, for which worked the Goan engineer Julius Simon and the Jesuit Portuguese Domingos Fernandes. Following the model of Portuguese Jesuit churches like the Church of the Holy Spirit of Évora and the church of St Roque Lisbon, Bom Jesus is a single nave temple; this is covered by a curved wooden liner and has no side chapel except for two chapel in transepto area. The facade of the church, the work of Domingos Fernandes, is of Mannerist style and has three portals and three floors compartmentalized for cornices; On the facade there is a large body theatrically decorated by pediment with a cartouche with the arms of the Society of Jesus and flanked by scrolls.

The greatest treasure in the interior of the church is the transept chapel where lie, since 1655, the remains of Francisco Xavier, in a silver urn finely crafted by local artists. The urn is located in a mausoleum executed by the Florentine artist Giovanni Battista Foggini in 1697. This monument in Italian marble, was offered by the Grand Duke of Tuscany, Cosimo III of Medici, and set in place by a specially-sent artist Placido Francesco Ramponi, who arrived in Goa in 1698 for this purpose. The main chapel has a golden altarpiece, dating from c. 1699, dedicated to the Infant Jesus with an image of Ignatius of Loyola, the founder of the Order.

The Basilica of Bom Jesus in Goa was ranked in 2009 as one of the Seven Wonders of Portuguese Origin in the World.

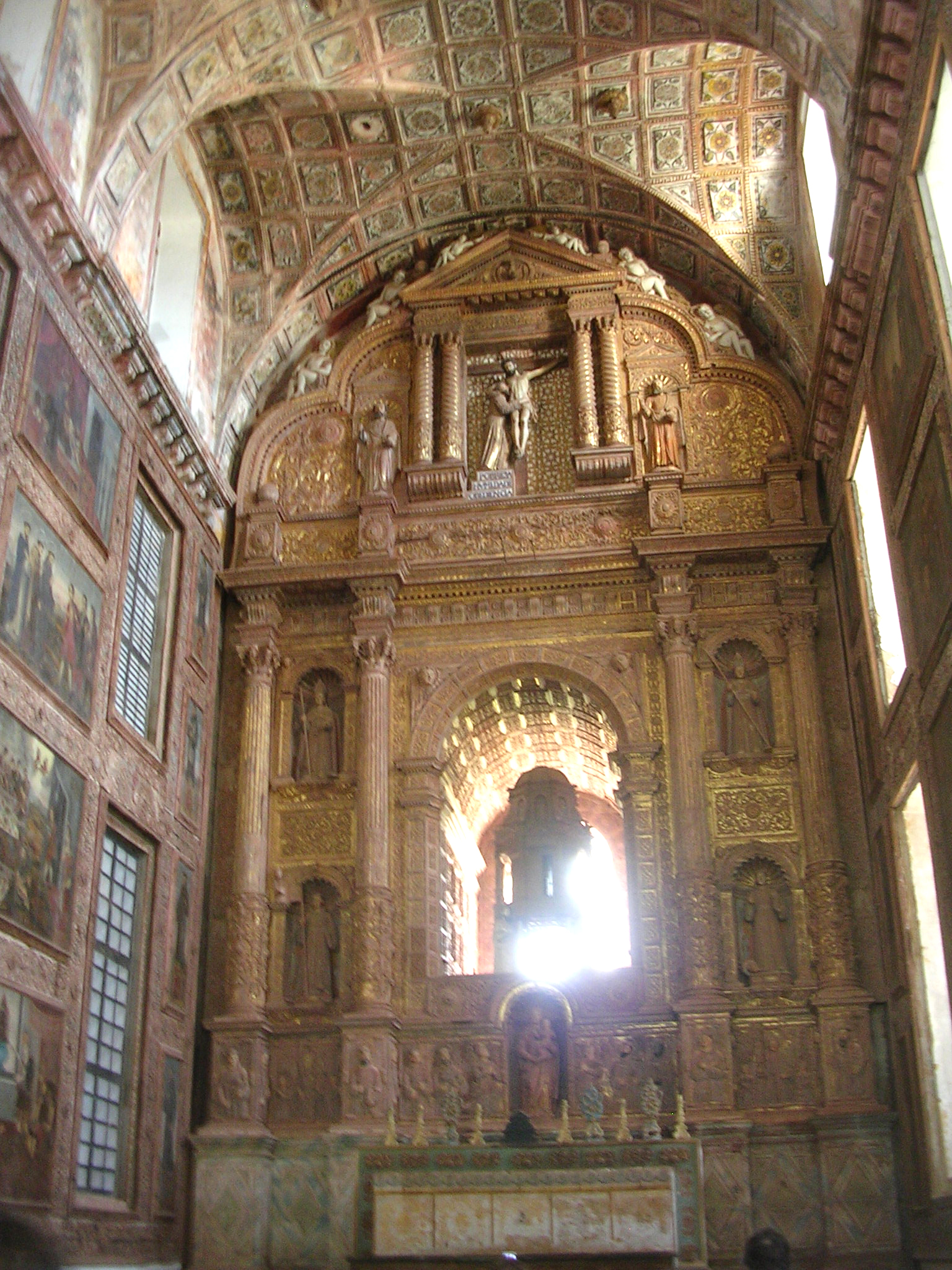
Main altar of the Church of St. Francis of Assisi

=== Church of St. Francis of Assisi ===
The Franciscan Order was the first to settle in Goa, obtaining in 1517 itself the permission of King Manuel I to build a convent. The early church was completed in 1521 but was completely rebuilt from 1661. While doing so, a doorway in Manueline style, was preserved and built on Mannerist facade of the new church. This portal, made of dark stone, has a lobed profile typically manufactory and a strike flanked by armillary spheres of King Manuel symbols. The facade is narrow and high, with two towers of octagonal section. In front, there is a large granite cross.

The interior has a single vaulted nave with side chapels and transept, covered by stucco and paintings. The floor of the church, like other churches of Goa, has a lot of graves with inscriptions and coats. The main chapel has several paintings on the life of St. Francis of Assisi and a large gilded altarpiece dating from c.1670 with a picture of Jesus on the cross embracing with one arm Francis Xavier. Behind the altar, visible through an opening thereof, is a carved tabernacle, supported by statues of the Four Evangelists, which was used to display the Blessed Sacrament and the ciborium.

=== Chapel of Santa Catarina ===
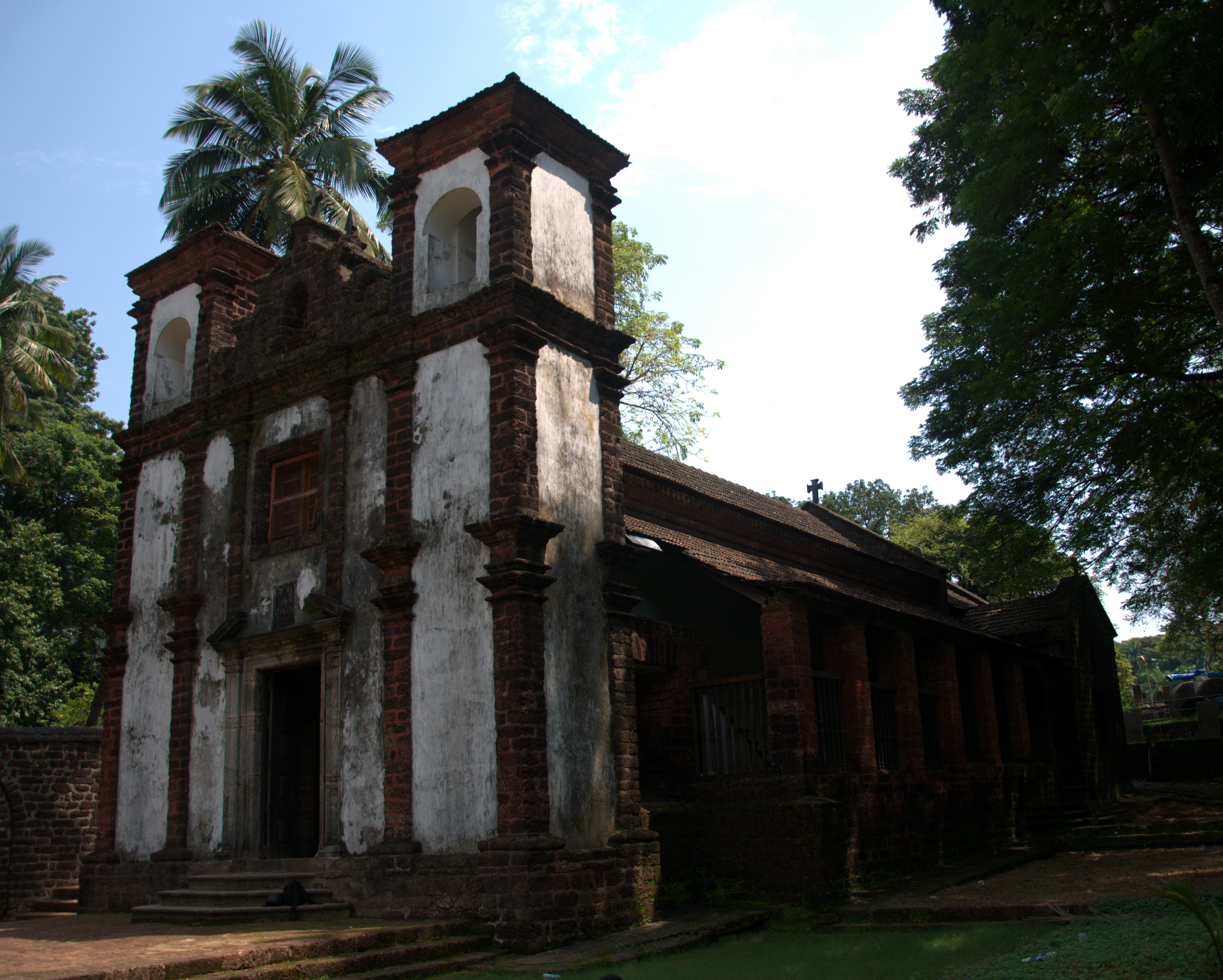
Chapel of Santa Catarina

In 1510, Afonso de Albuquerque conquered the city of Goa. A chapel was built at the door of the Muslim wall of Goa, where the Portuguese invaded. This chapel was located near the site of the Royal Hospital, which stood north of the Convent of St Francis near the Arsenal. It is about 100 meters west of the Church of St Francis of Assisi. In 1534 the chapel was granted cathedral status by Pope Paul III and was subsequently rebuilt; the inscribed stone added during rebuilding states that Afonso de Albuquerque actually entered the city at this spot, and thus it's believed that the chapel stands on what used to be the main gate of the Muslim city, then known as Ela.

It is a rectangular plan building with a single nave, with quadrangular head. The shape is simple and the facade with three bodies separated by pilasters. The central body has an axial port straight lintel stone with triangular pediment topped with a window flanked by two bell towers of square section and coverage gable roof. The church interior is a single nave, with the chancel of stone, with ceiling cylindrical vat, also in stone.

=== Ruins of the Church of St. Augustine ===
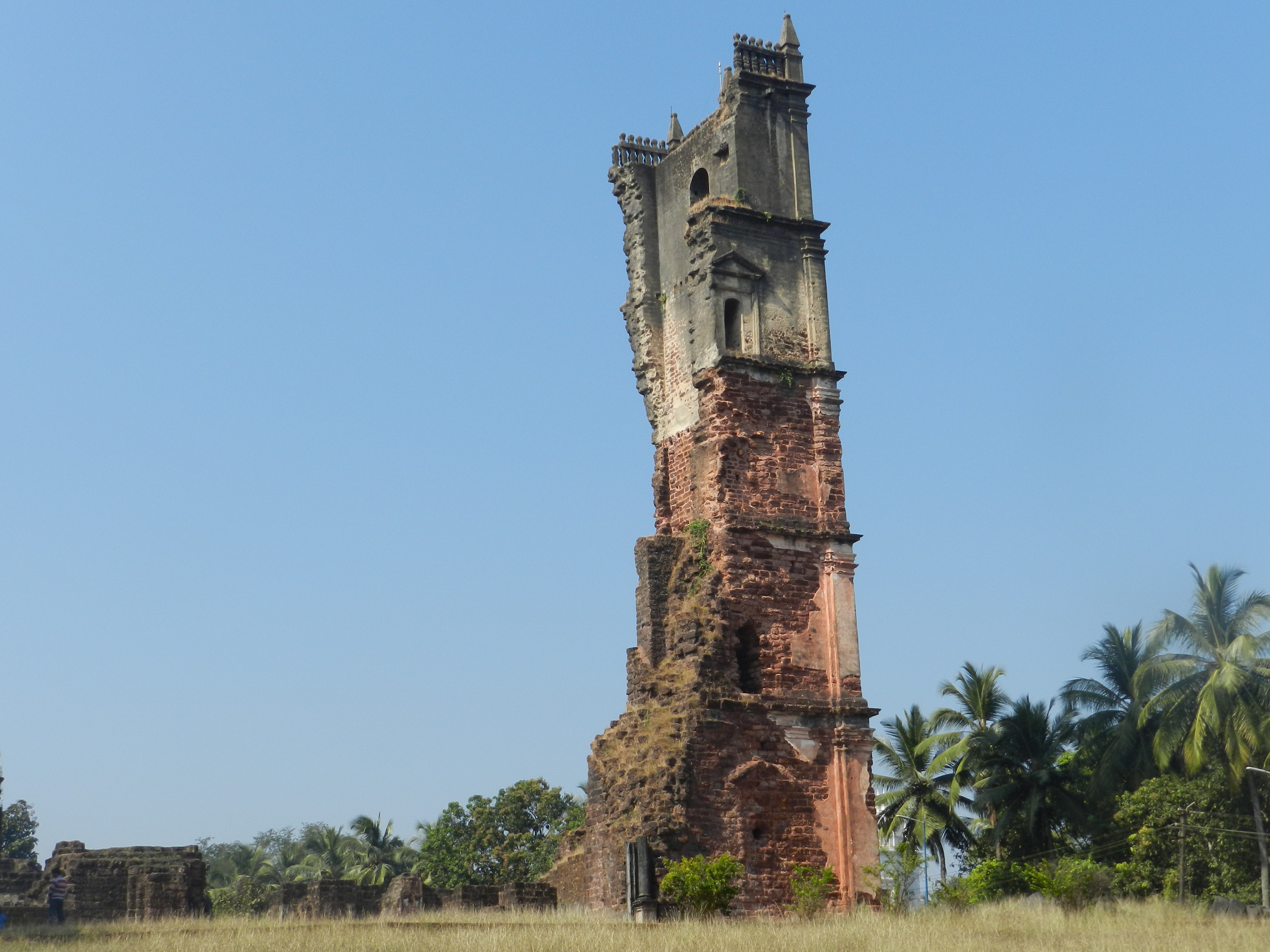
Ruins of the bell tower of the Church of St. Augustine

The Augustinians too arrived in Goa in the sixteenth century, founding a convent and a church building from 1597. Currently, both are in ruins; the vault of the church collapsed in 1842 and the facades fell in 1936. Of the remains of the church, the most striking is a part of a tower that is still standing. It is known that the original facade was flanked by two huge towers of five floors, and the domestic side was a single nave with side chapels and transept.

=== Church of Divine Providence (São Caetano or Saint Cajetan) ===
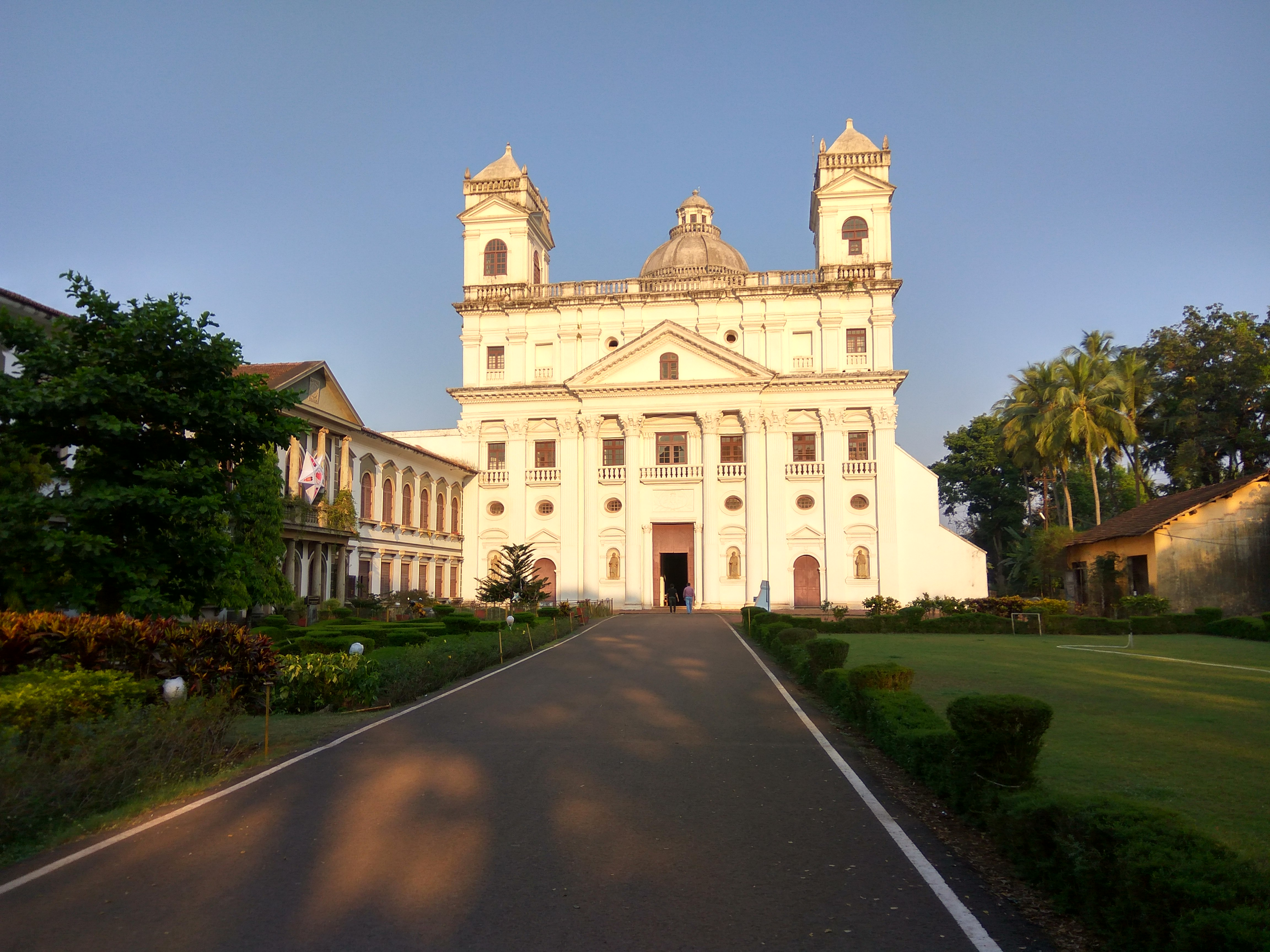
The Church of Divine Providence (St. Cajetan)

In 1639, religious of the Theatines reached Goa to found a convent. They built the St. Cajetan Church by 1665, dedicated to St. Cajetan and to Our Lady of Providence, designed by the Italian architects Carlo Ferrarini and Francesco Maria Milazzo with the plan in the form of a Greek cross. The facade mimics the facade designed by Carlo Maderno for St. Peter's Basilica in Rome. It's crowned with a huge hemispherical dome, on the pattern of the Roman Basilica of St. Peter. However, instead of two cupolas it exhibits two quadrangular towers. The church exhibits superb examples of Corinthian architecture.

Four basalt statues of St. Paul, St. Peter, St. John the Evangelist and St. Matthew are located in niches in the facade that also inscribes the words, "Domus mea, domus oration/s" meaning, "My House is a House of Prayer" (etched across the portal).

== Conservation and preservation ==
The UNESCO Bureau was informed that the World Heritage Center undertook a mission to Goa in January 1999 to develop a project proposal based on co-operation between the local authorities of Old Goa (India), Guimaraes (Portugal) and Brighton & Hove (UK) for submission to the European Union Asia Urbs Programme. During this mission, it was noted that while there is an important effort being made to conserve the individual monuments, the overall site is not cohesive, both visually and spatially. Widening of the roads, neglect of archaeological ruins and new spatial organization and landscaping have enclosed the individual monuments in garden squares which have no relation to the historic urban form, thereby making the site into a collection of monuments undermining the integrity of the site as a former port town.

The central government of India, upon consultations with the church of Old Goa (Catholic diocese), the State of Goa and locally based experts of the Fundação Orient (Portuguese institution), among other institutions and non-governmental organizations, and in close collaboration with the local branch of the Archaeological Survey of India, prepared a project proposal for urban conservation and preservation. The said proposal is now pending approval by the central Indian government prior to submission to donors. Subsequent discussions with the Portuguese Director General for National Monuments and Edifices (DGEMN) have resulted in a commitment of collaboration between the central government (India) and DGEMN to carry out an inventory of the site as the first step in elaborating a more coherent conservation management plan.

== Gallery ==
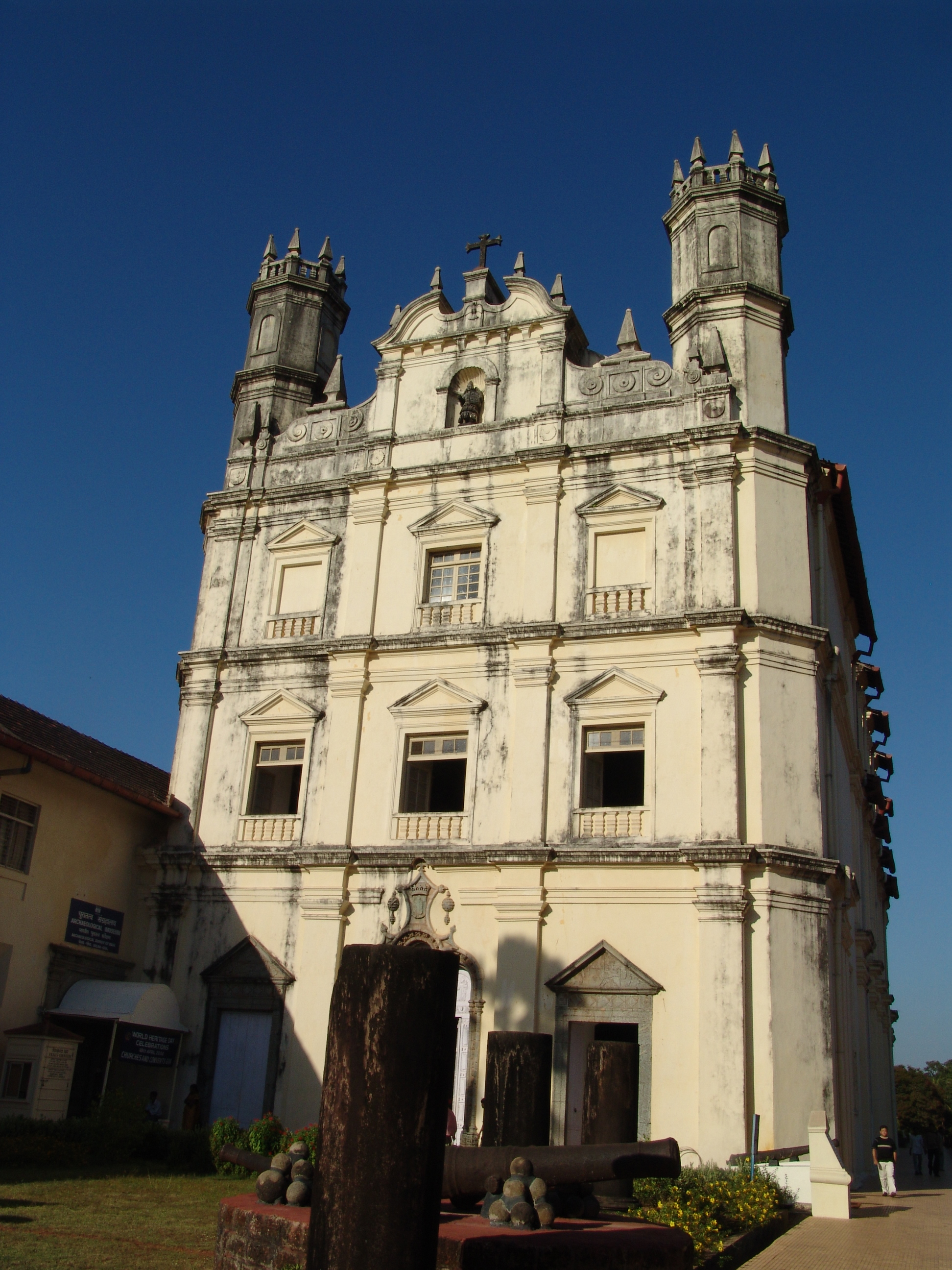
Facade of the Church of St. Francis of Assisi (Igreja de São Francisco de Assis), a church that signifies best the blending of Portuguese-Manueline style into the later Tuscan style

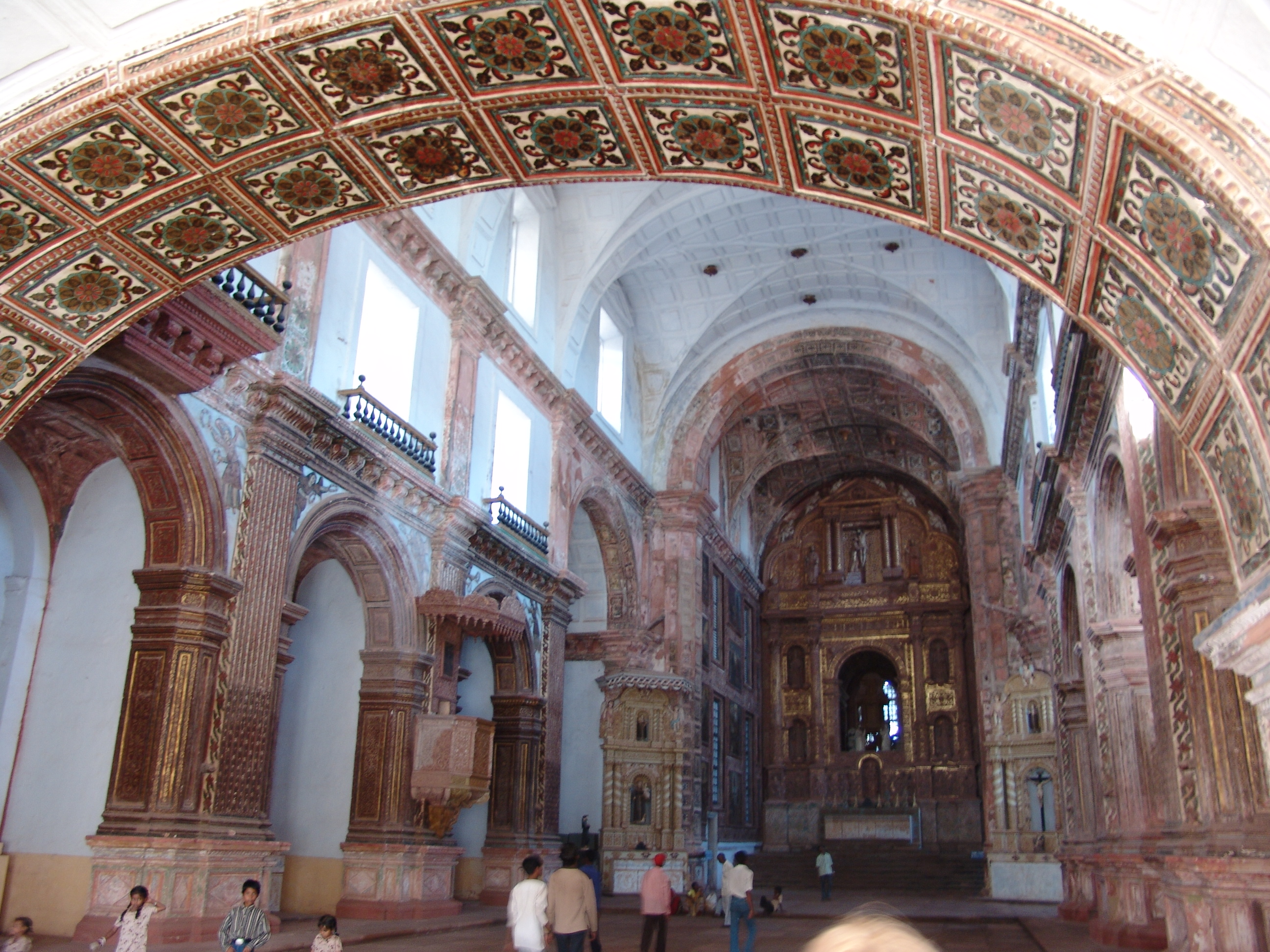
In contrast to the simple outer façade the interiors of the Church of St. Francis are adorned lavishly in the Baroque style using Corinthian influences

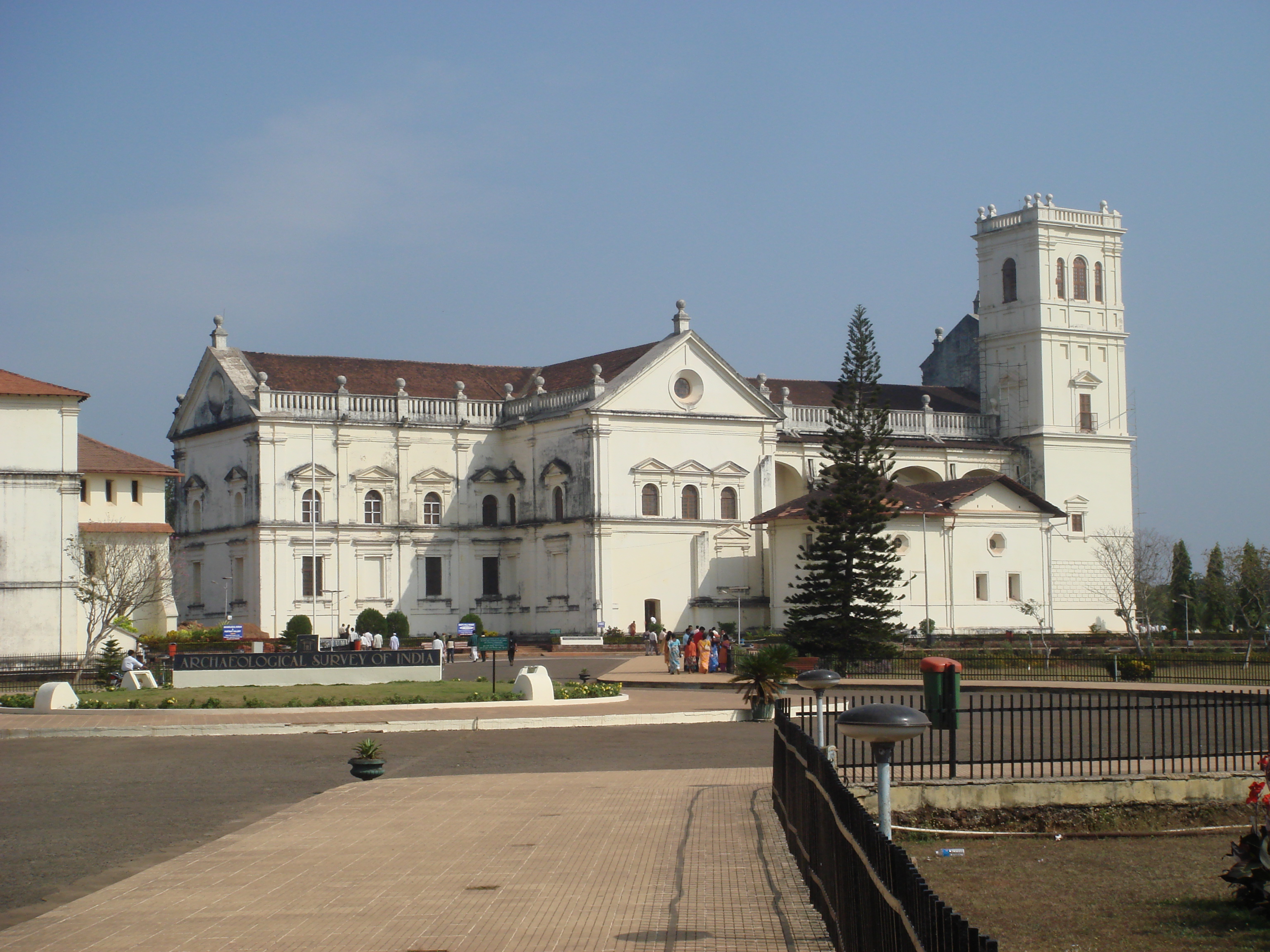
The Tuscan Cathedral of Santa Catarina (Saint Catherine) at over 76m long and 55m is the largest church in Asia

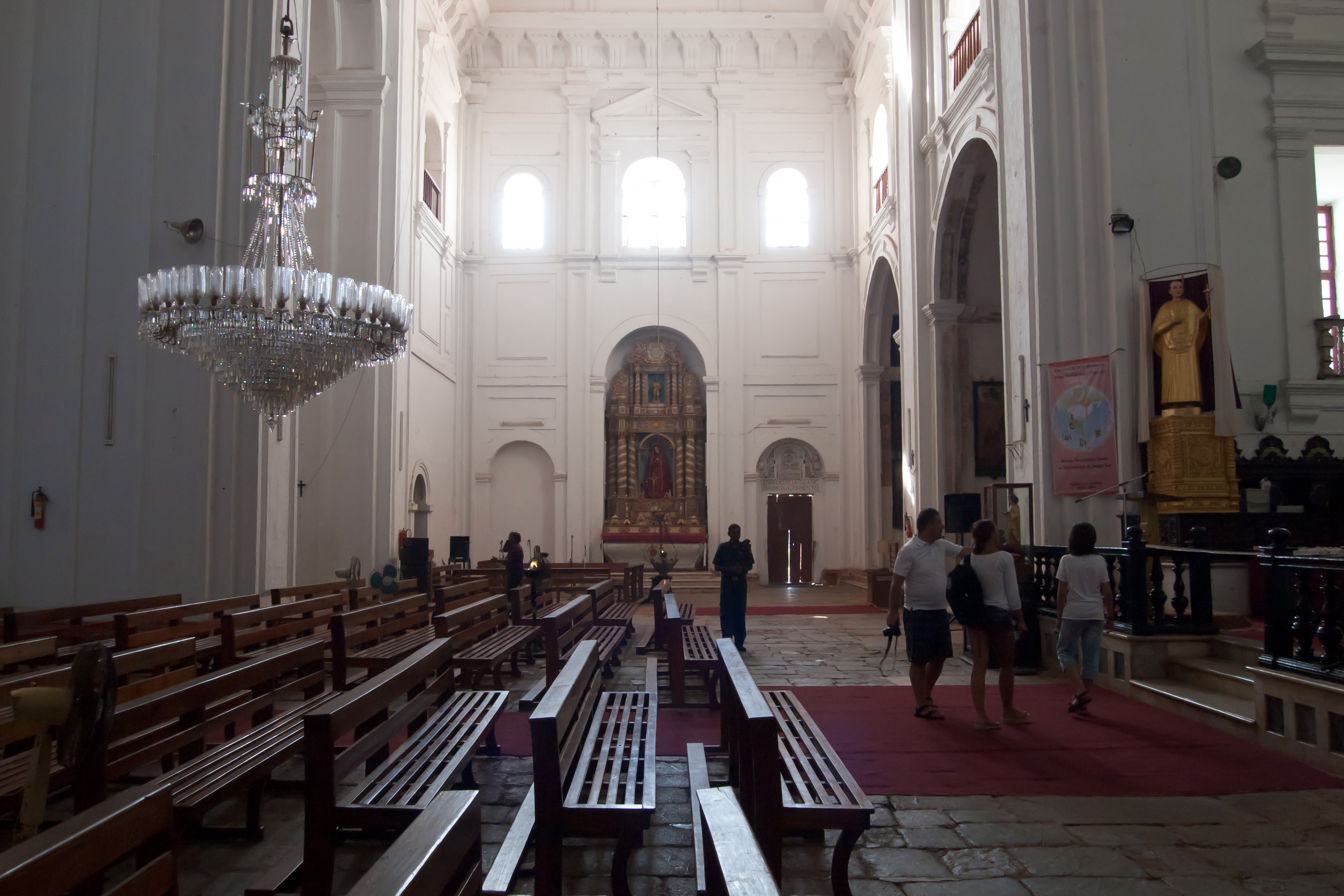
Interior of the Santa Catarina (Saint Catherine) Cathedral

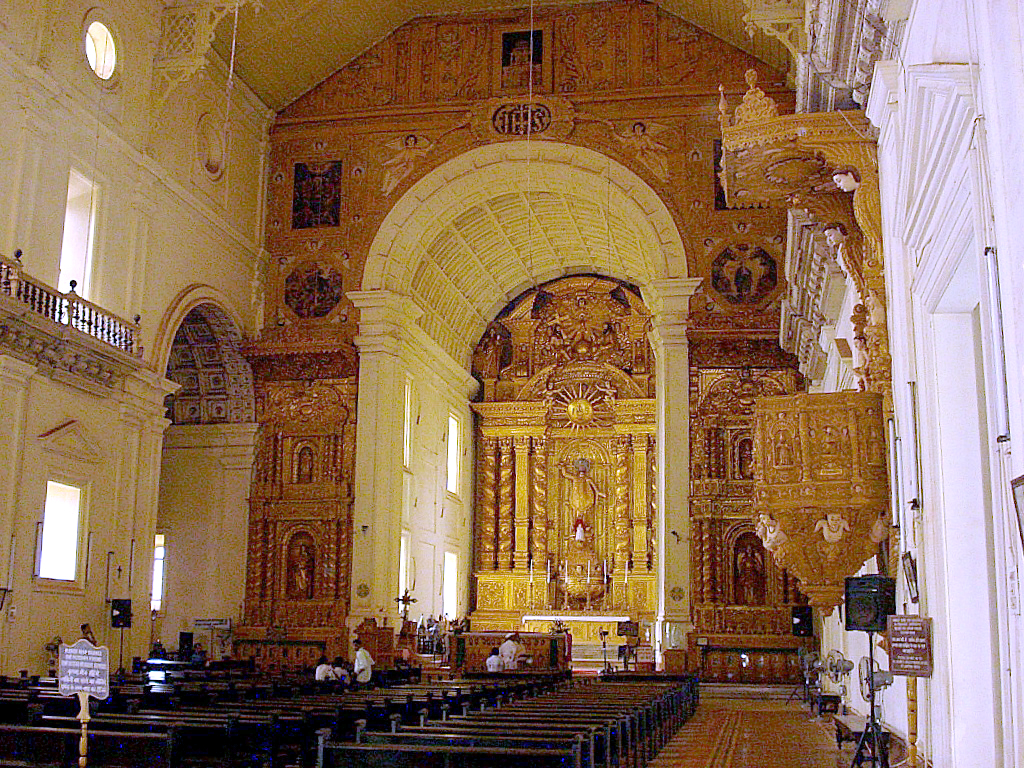
Main altar (nave) of the Basilica of Bom Jesus, famous throughout the Roman Catholic world for the casket of Saint Francis Xavier located in a nave (not seen in picture) beside the main altar

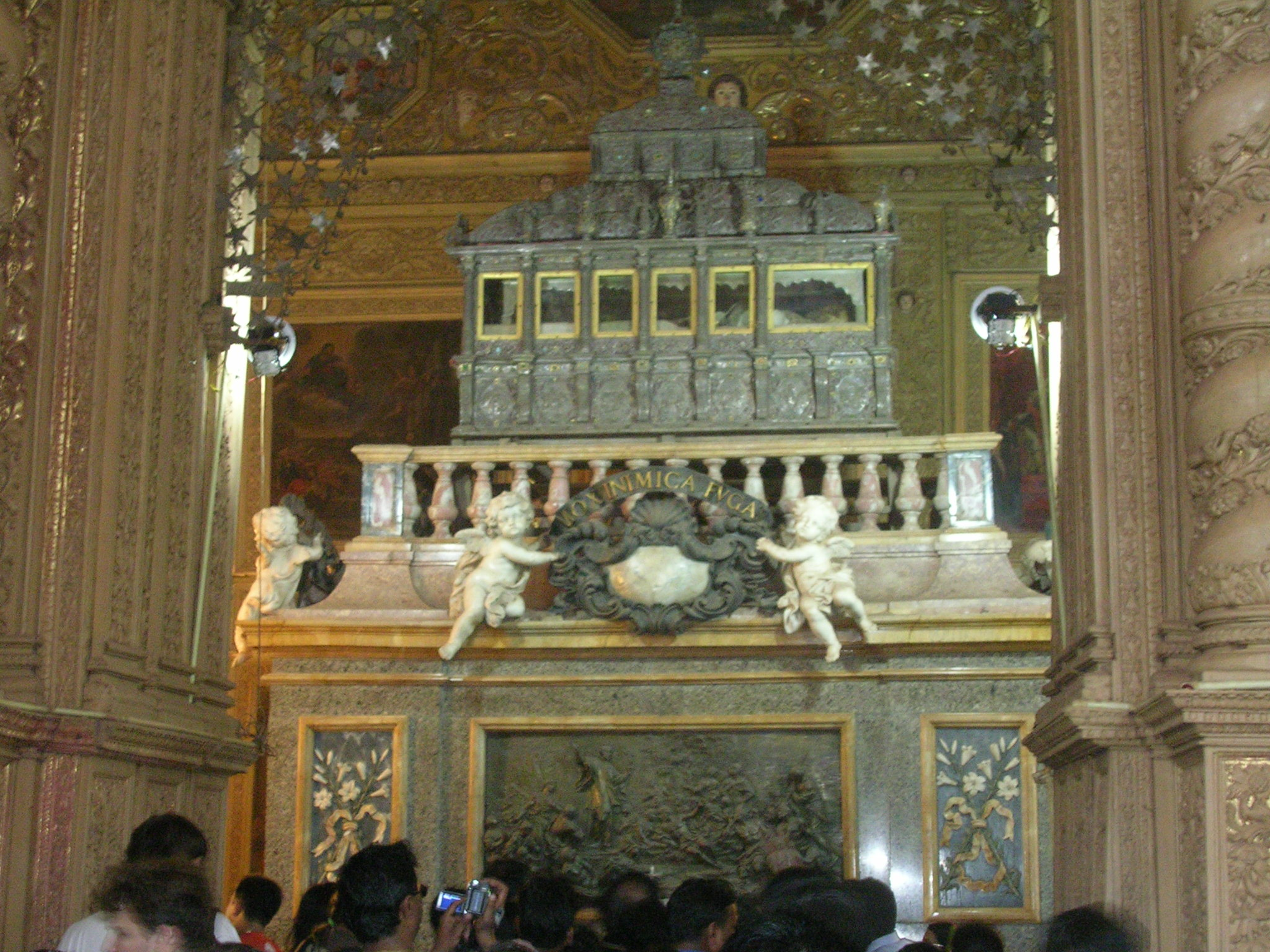
The silver casket of St. Francis Xavier inside the Basilica of Bom Jesus has thirty two episodes of his life depicted on all four sides of the silver plates

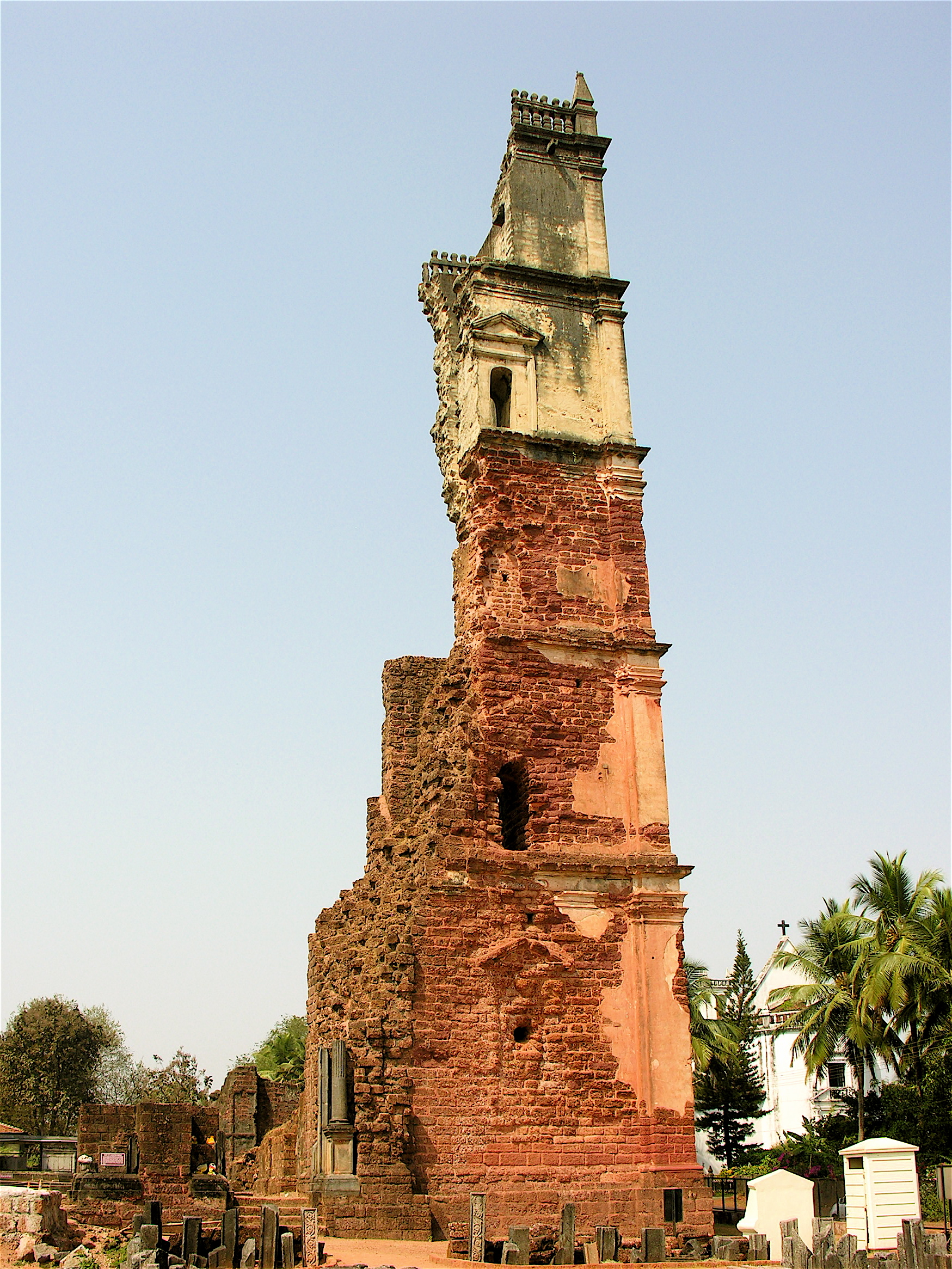
The 46 m high Saint Augustine tower (Torre de São Augustine) sits atop Monte Santo (Holy Hill) and was part of a monastery of the Augustinian order

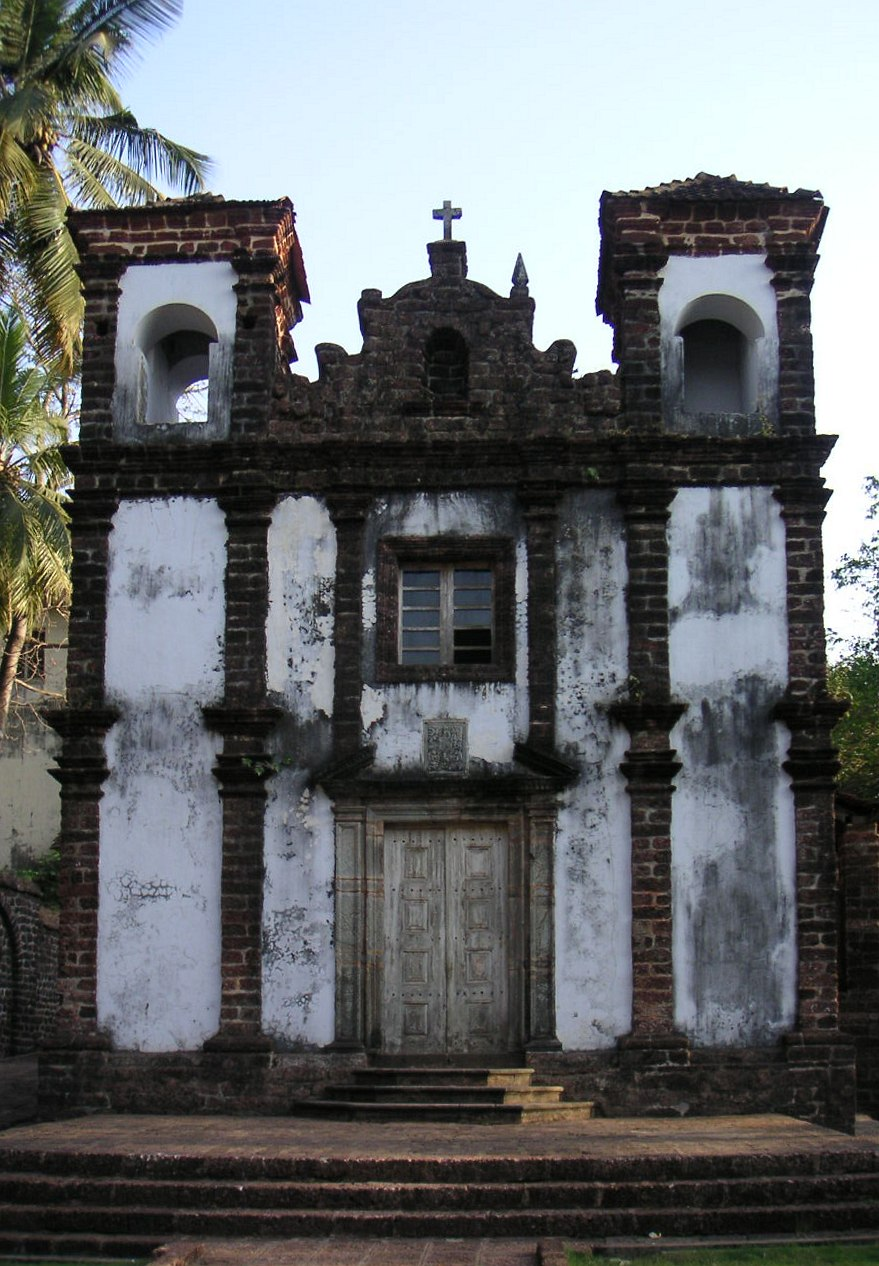
Chapel of Santa Catarina built by Afonso de Albuquerque in 1510 to commemorate his triumphant entry on Saint Catherine's Day

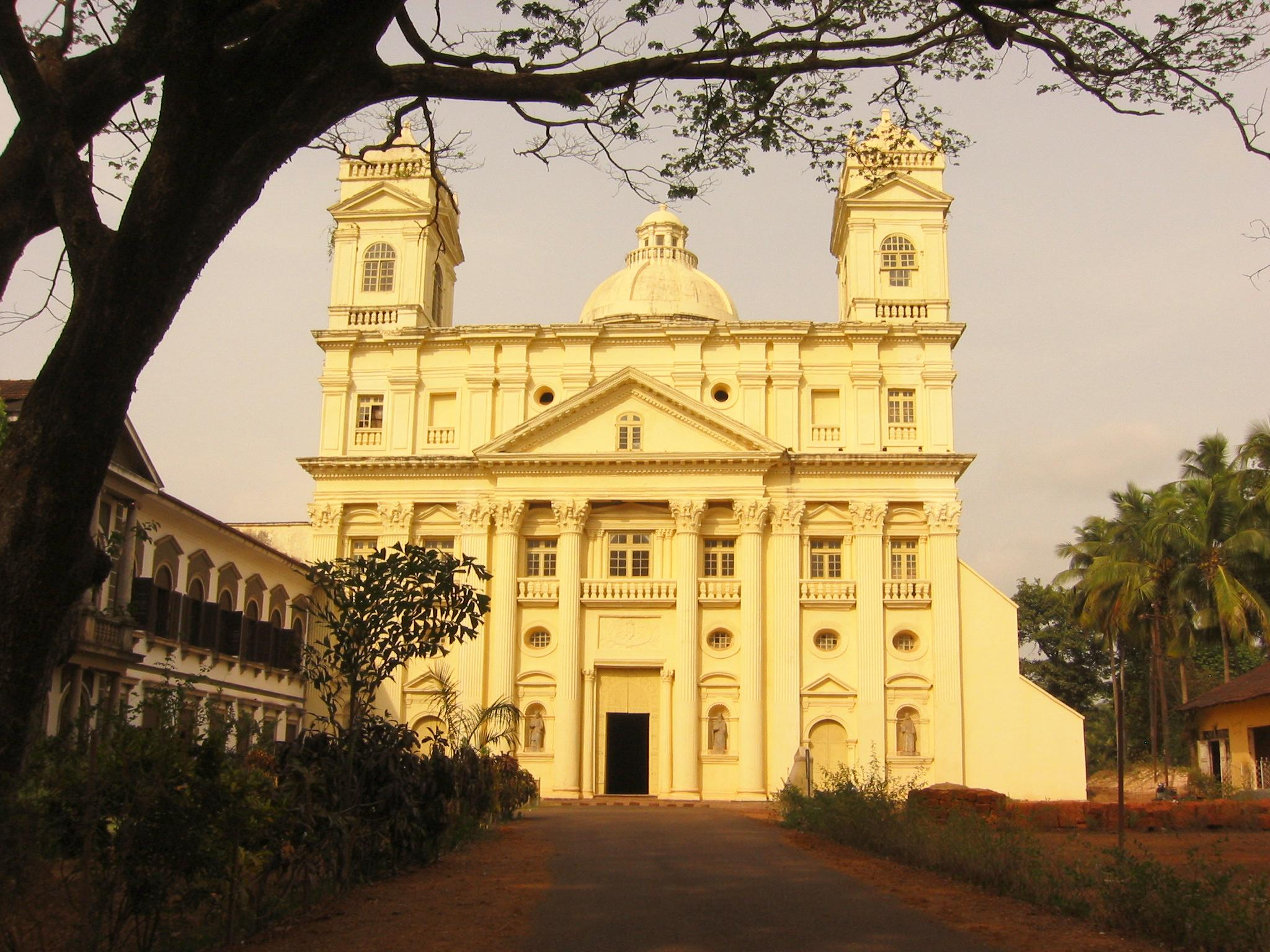
Church of Divine Providence (Igreja da Divina Providência) besides the Convent of Saint Cajetan (Convento de São Caetano) is modelled after the initial Saint Peter's Basilica and has two towers as well as Corinthian columns and pilasters supporting a pediment, in which are kept the statues of the apostles.

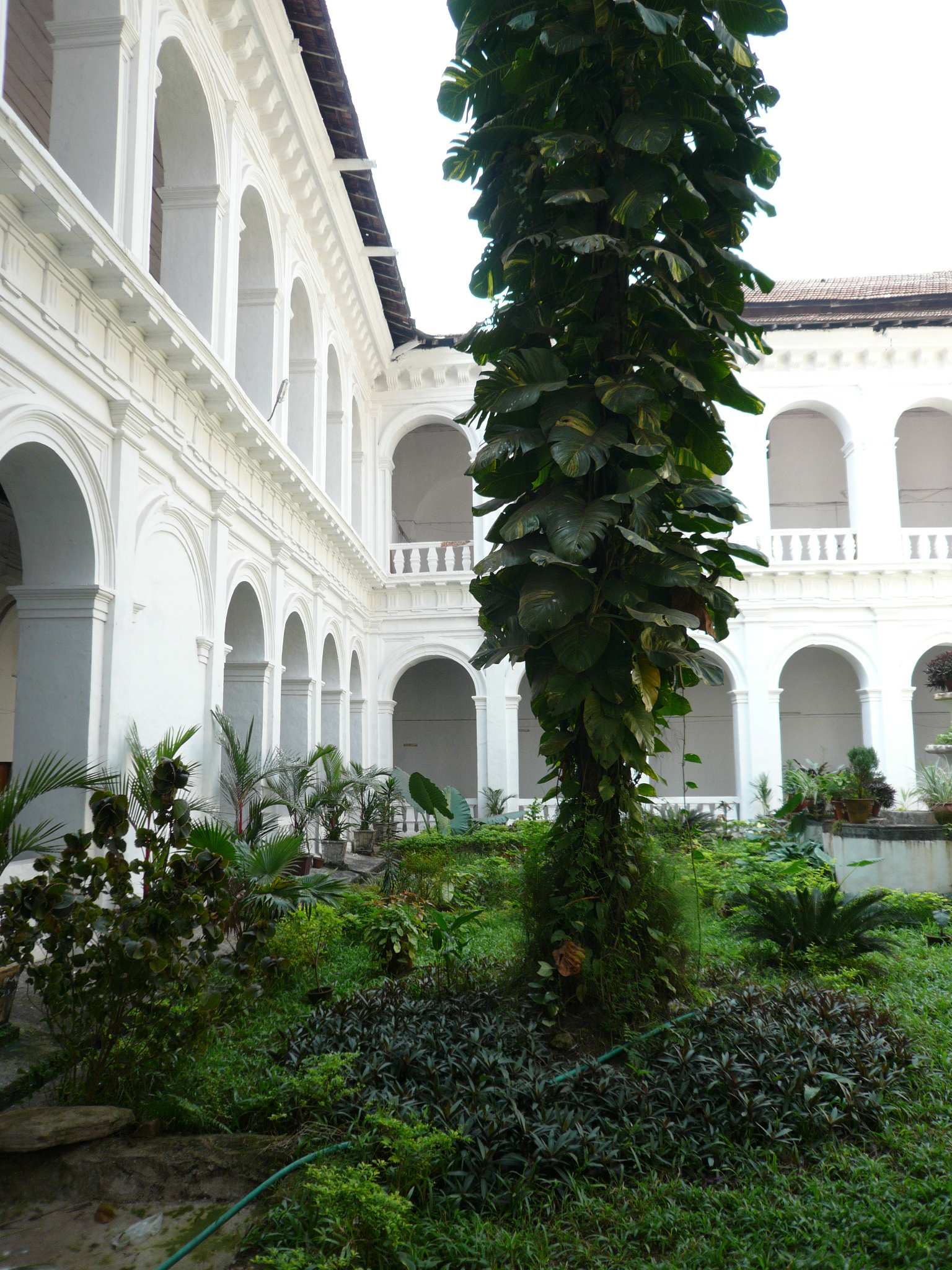
Completed in 1589 under the able supervision of Br. Domingos Fernandes, the Casa Professa or the "Professed House" according to Jesuit law is one which is intended for the exercise of the ministries of the Society of Jesus in Goa

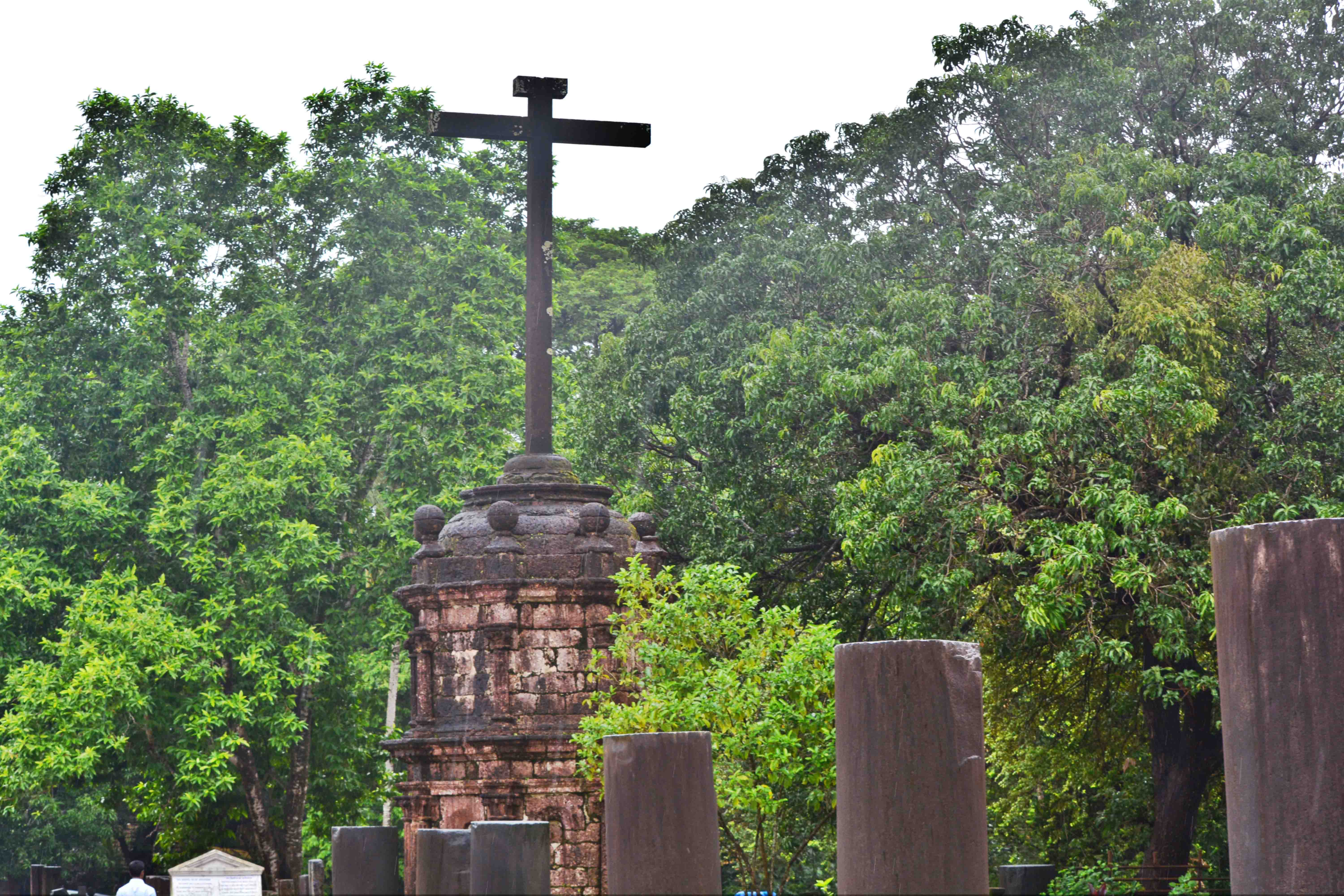
The surrounding areas are dotted with age-old crosses, all of which are still revered in Goa today

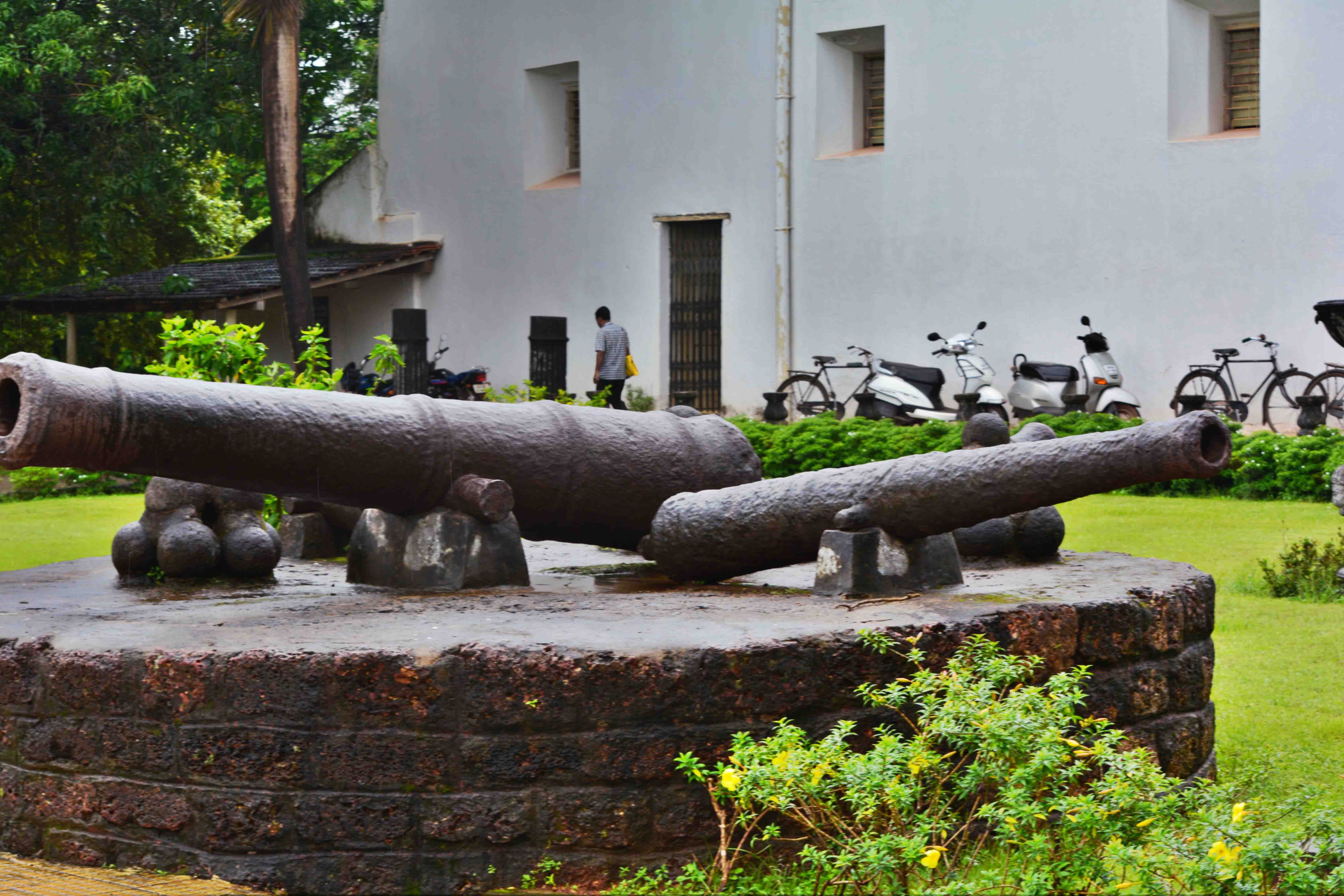
Portuguese cannons serve as a reminder of the glory days of the trading hub of Goa

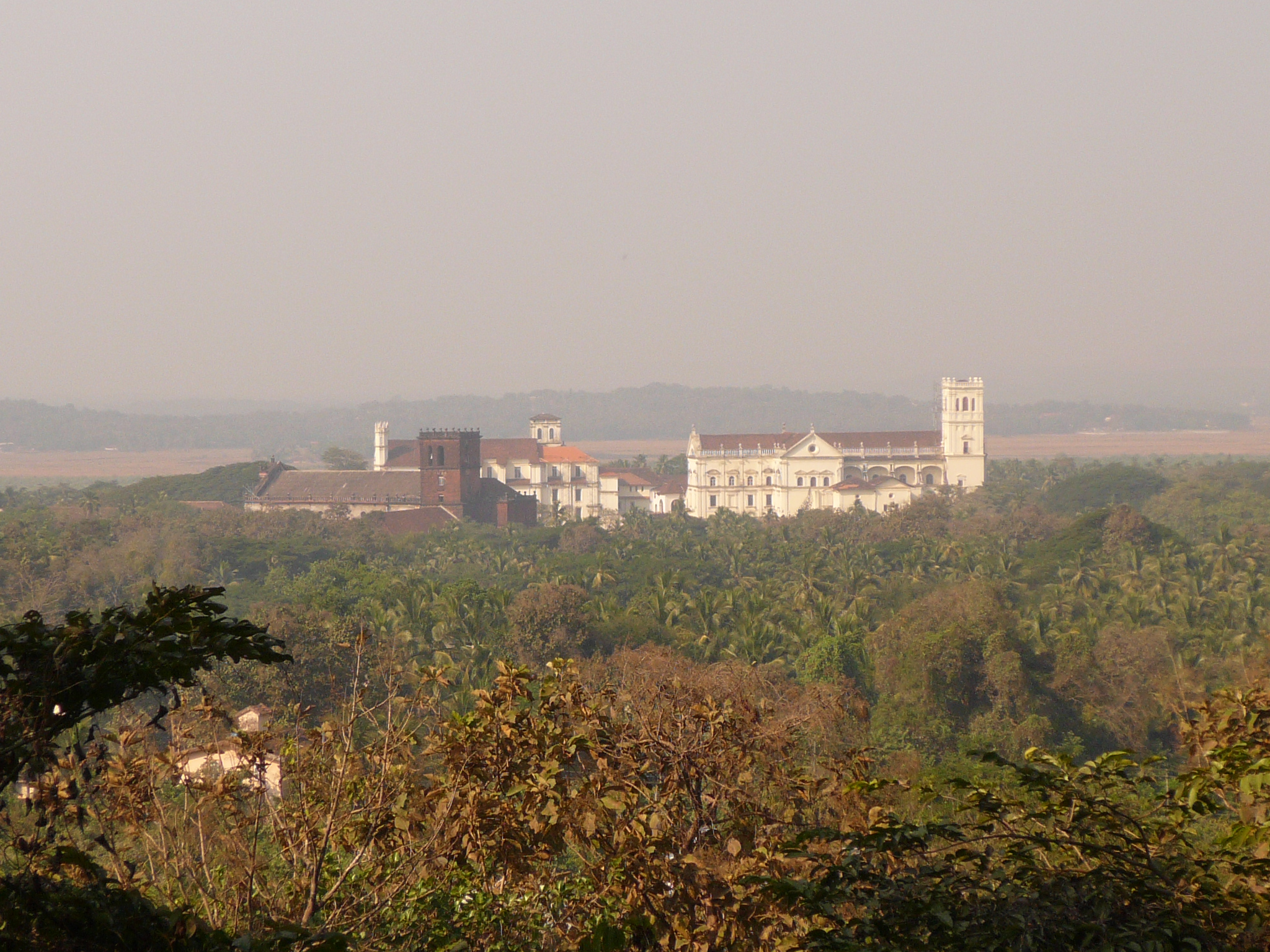
A distant view of Old Goa today with the majestic churches and cathedrals rising above the lush green areas surrounding them

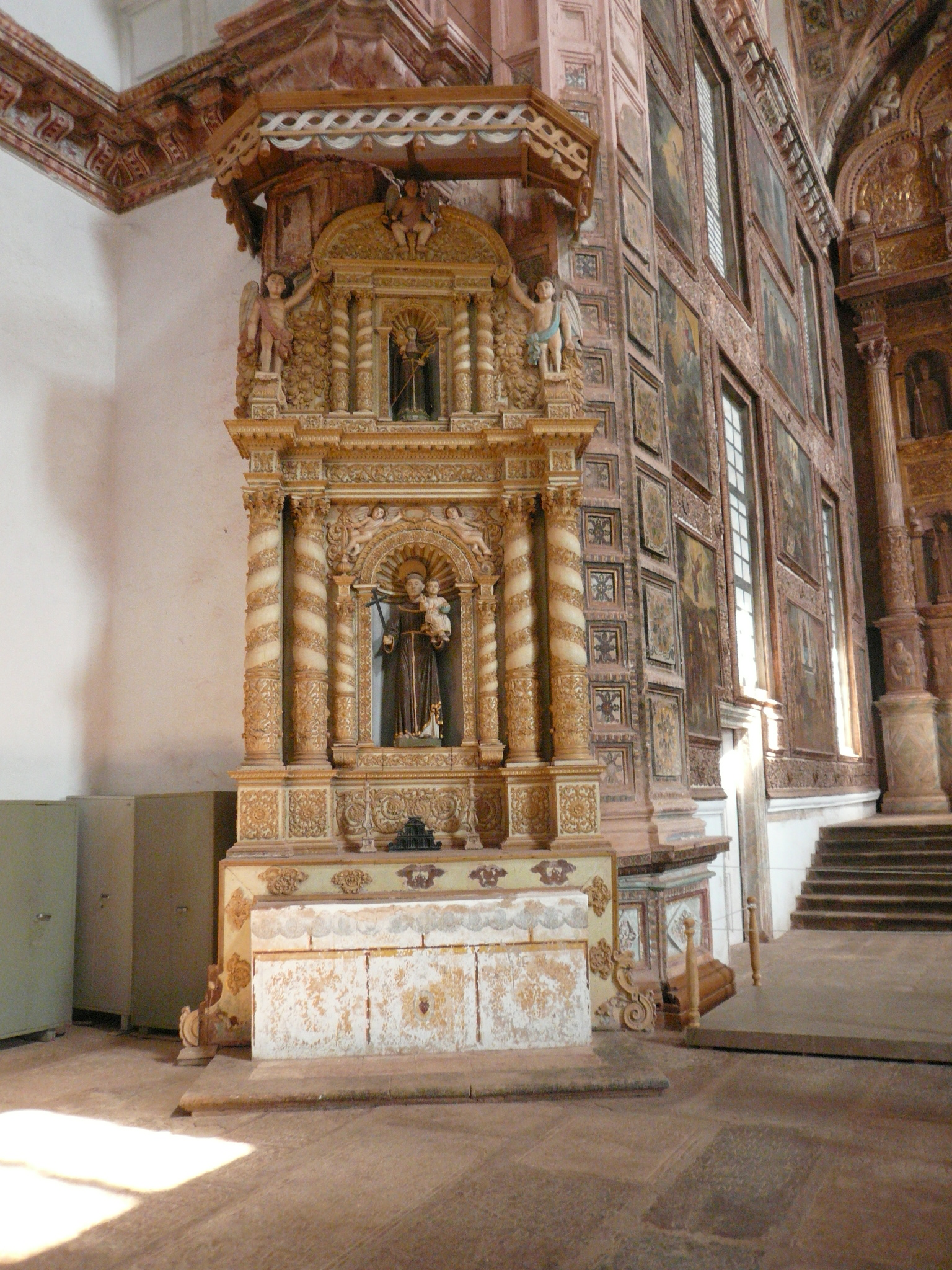
A smaller side-altar, common feature that graces most Goan churches

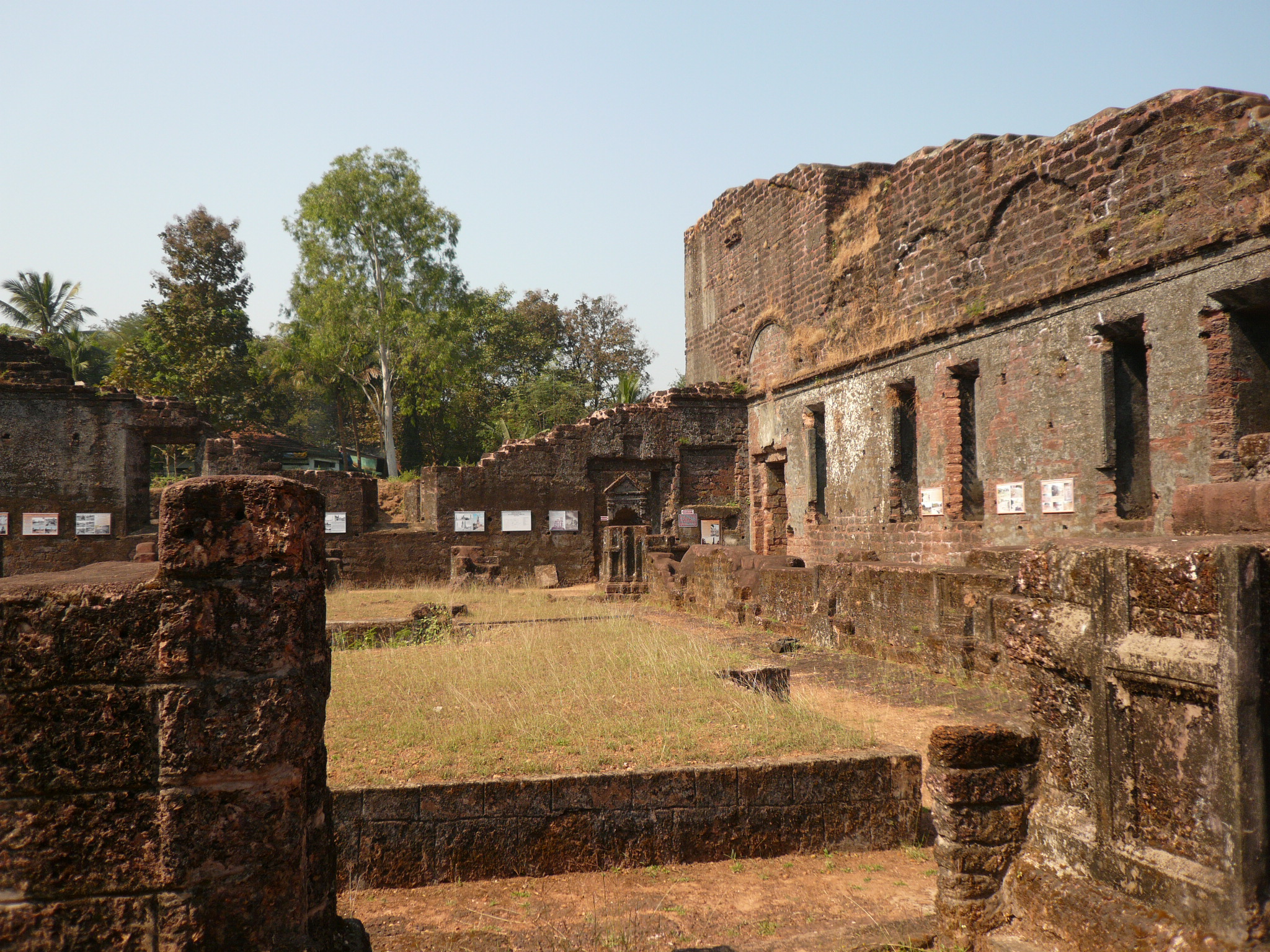
Ruins of the former city's religious spaces serve as a treasure to travelers to ponder over the scale of the once mighty city they catered to

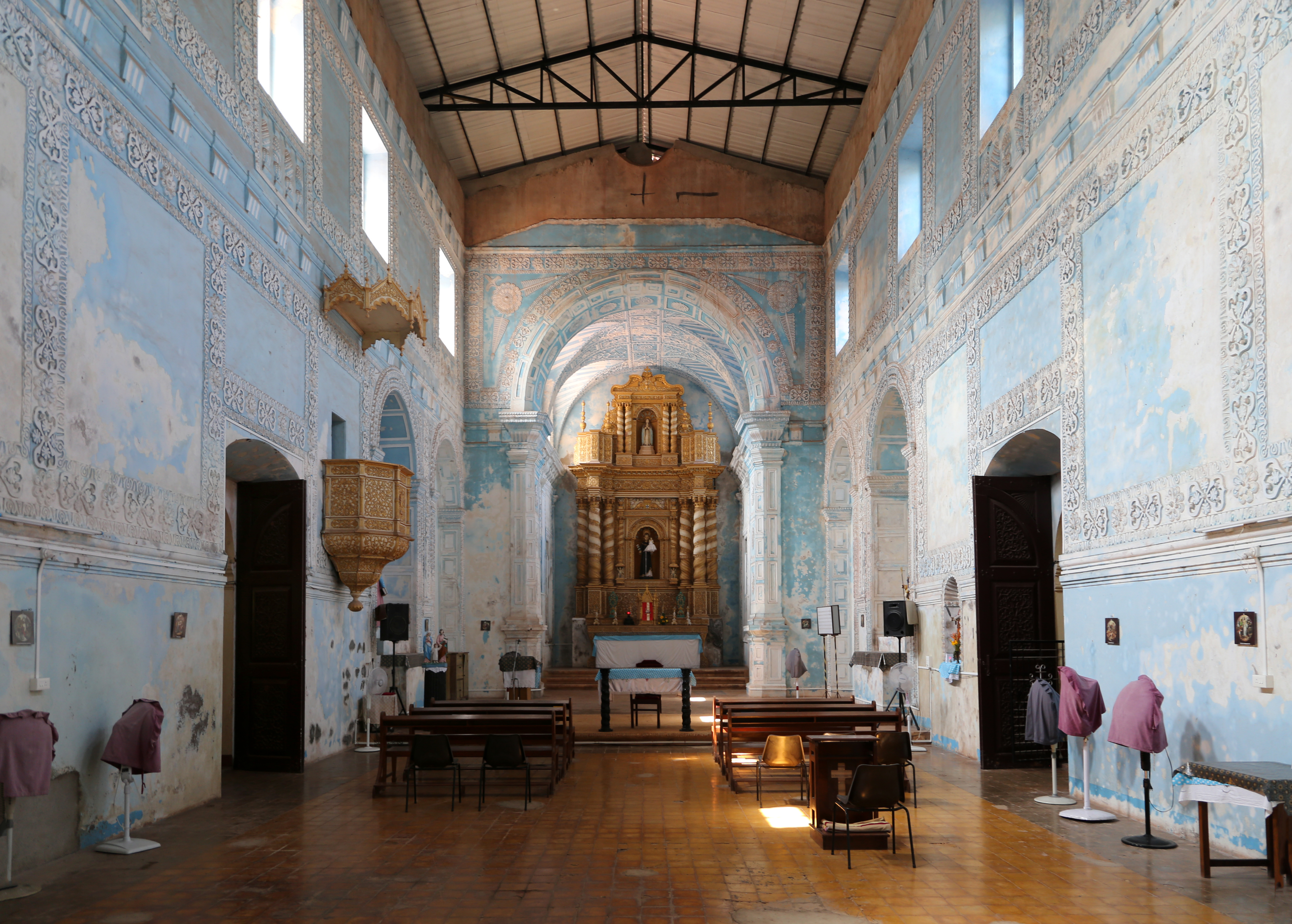
Interior of the Royal Chapel of St. Anthony (Capela Real de Santo António)
