= Lourenço de Santa Maria e Melo =

Portuguese prelate (1704-1783)

Lourenço de Santa Maria e Melo OFM
- Archebishop-Bishop of the Alrgave
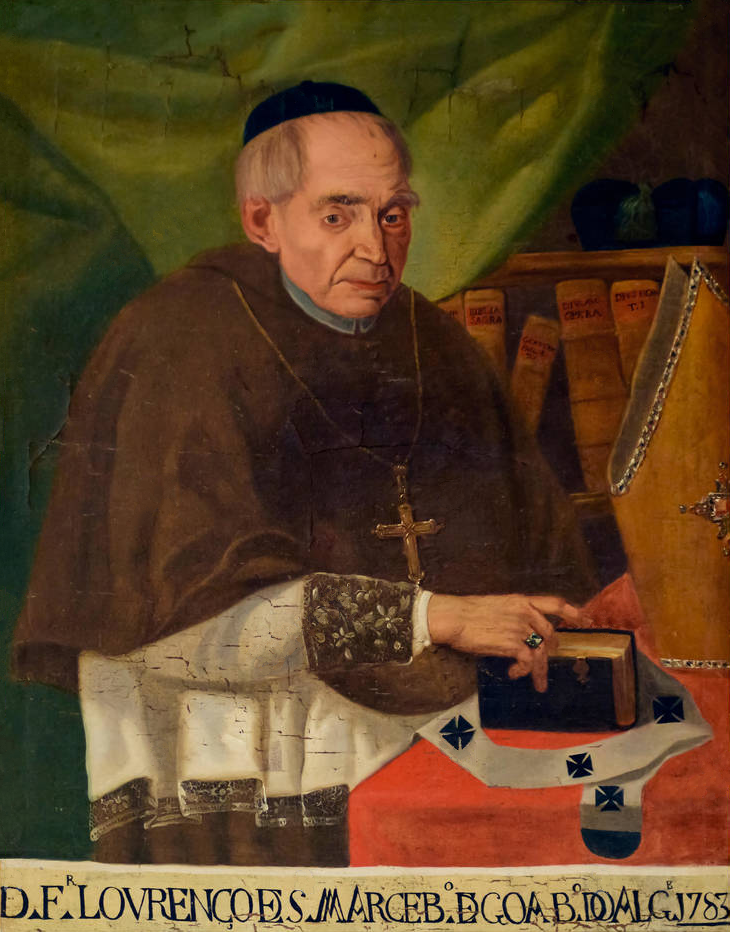
- Portrait of Bishop Lourenço de Santa Maria e Melo, Episcopal Palace of Faro
- Archdiocese: Archdiocese of Évora
- Province: Évora
- Metropolis: Archdiocese of Évora
- Diocese: Diocese of the Algarve
- Appointed: 26 de November de 1742
- Previous posts: Archebishop-Bishop of Goa and Patriarch of the East Indies (1742 - 1750)

Orders
- Ordination: 30 June 1730
- Consecration: 9 June 1743

Personal details
- Born: Anadia, Kingdom of Portugal
- Died: 5 December 1783 Faro, Kingdom of the Algarve

Lourenço de Santa Maria e Melo OFM, or with the secular name of Lourenço Bernardo de Melo de Sampaio Pereira de Figueiredo (16 January 1704 in Anadia – 5 December 1783 in Faro) was a Portuguese prelate, Archbishop of Goa and Primate of the East and later Bishop of the Algarve.

Fr. Lourenço de Santa Maria e Melo entered the Franciscan Seminary of Varatojo in 1727 and was ordained a Franciscan priest in Varatojo on 13 June 1730. On 9 June 1743, he was consecrated Archbishop of Goa and Primate of the East at the Patriarchal Palace in Lisbon. He left for Goa where he stayed until 1750, when he resigned due to ill health.

Back in Portugal, he was appointed archbishop-bishop of the Algarve in 1752, a position he held until 1783, when he died.

As archbishop-bishop of the Algarve, he had to deal with the problems caused by the 1755 earthquake in the region, which destroyed Faro's cathedral tower, several churches and houses.

He was the great-uncle of the 1st Viscount of Graciosa, 1st Count of Graciosa and 1st Marquis of Graciosa.
