= Se Cathedral =

Latin Catholic cathedral in Goa, India

- Cathedral of St. Catherine
- Portuguese: Sé Catedral de Santa Catarina; Goan Konkani: Bhagevont Katerinachi Katedral
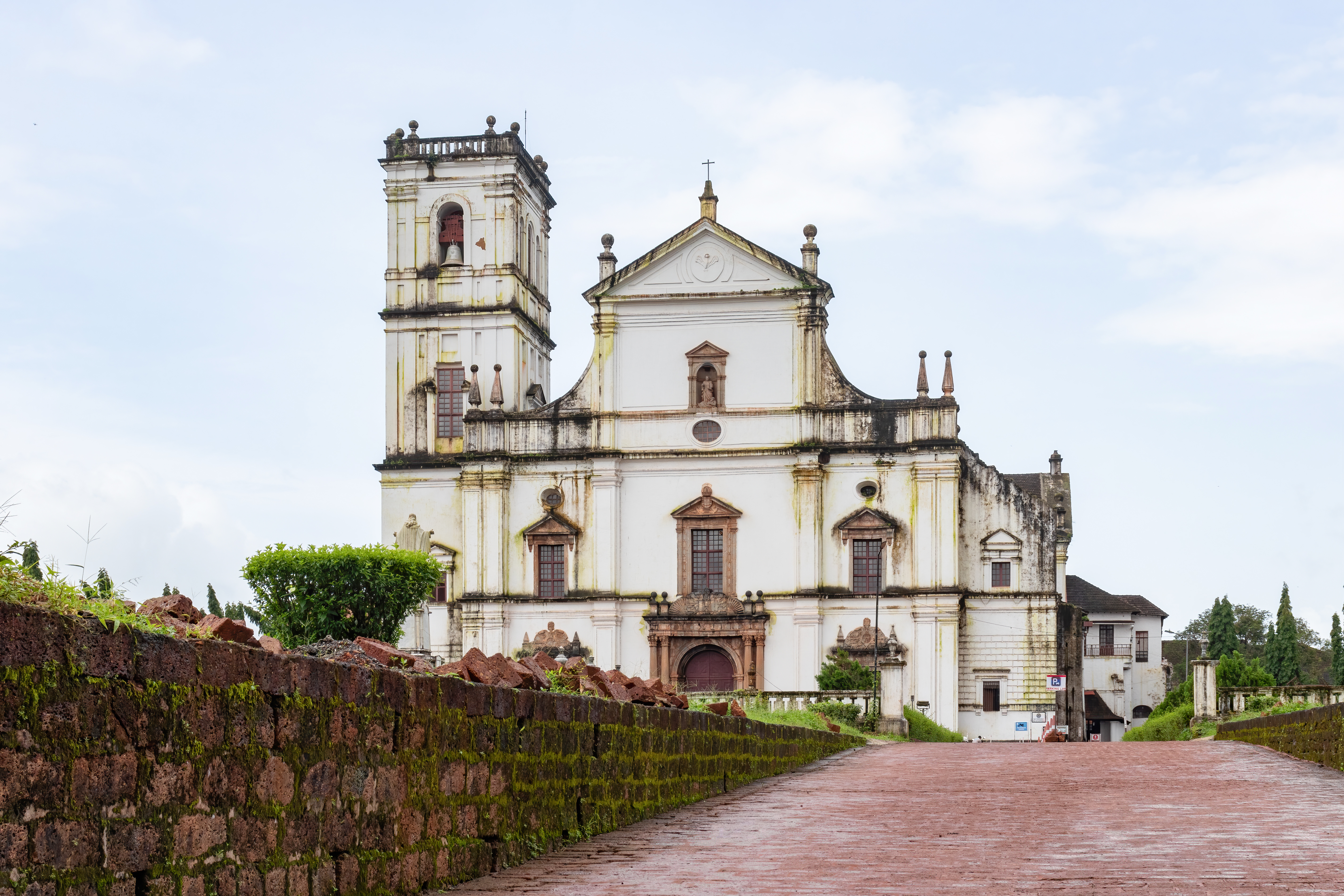
- Front façade of the Se Cathedral
- Se Cathedral
- 15°30′13.58″N 73°54′44.39″E
- Location: Old Goa
- Country: India
- Denomination: Catholic Church
- Sui iuris church: Latin Church
- Website: archgoadaman.com

History
- Status: Cathedral
- Founded: 1619; 407 years ago
- Dedication: Catherine of Alexandria
- Consecrated: 1640

Architecture
- Style: Portuguese-Gothic

Specifications
- Length: 250 feet (76 m)
- Width: 181 feet (55 m)

Administration
- Archdiocese: Archdiocese of Goa and Daman

The Sé Catedral de Santa Catarina, known as Se Cathedral, is the cathedral of the Latin Church Archdiocese of Goa and Daman and the seat of the Patriarch of the East Indies. It is part of the World Heritage Site, Churches and convents of Goa located in Old Goa, India.

== History ==
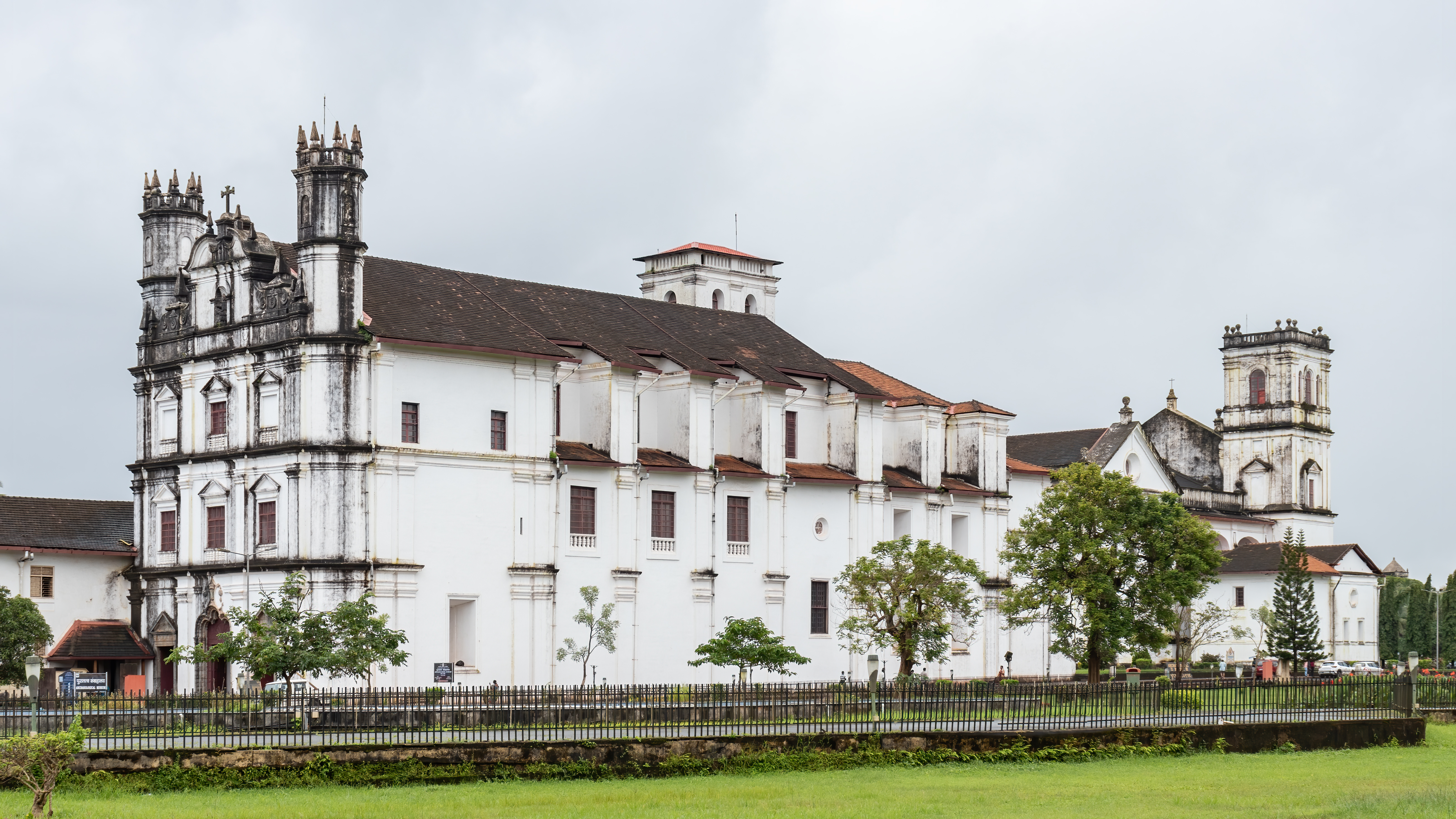
A view of the Se Cathedral and Church of St. Francis

The word Sé is Portuguese for See. The Se Cathedral was built to commemorate the victory of the Portuguese under Afonso de Albuquerque over a Muslim army, leading to the capture of the city of Goa in 1510. Since the day of the victory happened to be on the feast of Saint Catherine, the cathedral was dedicated to her.

It was commissioned by Governor George Cabral to be enlarged in 1552 on the remains of an earlier structure. Construction of the church began in 1562 in the reign of King Dom Sebastião. The cathedral was completed in 1619 and was consecrated in 1640.

It had two towers, but one collapsed in 1776 and was never rebuilt.

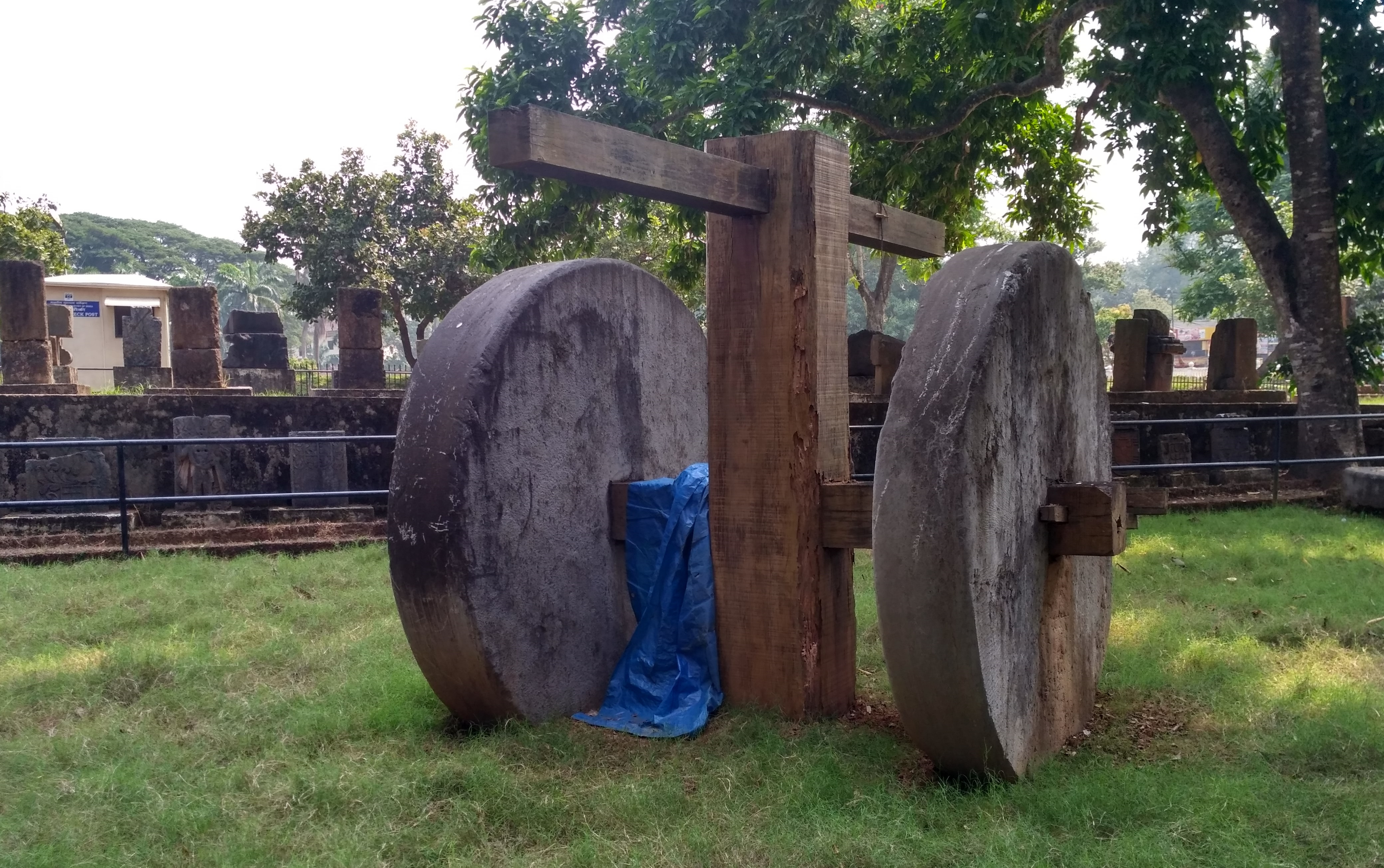
Mill Stones from the Gun Powder factory preserved at the church.

In 1953, the cathedral was presented with "The Golden Rose" by Venerable Pope Pius XII. The Golden Rose is a gold ornament, which the Popes of the Catholic Church have traditionally blessed and conferred as a token of reverence or affection. It is placed on the tomb of St. Francis Xavier.

The first Lithuanian Jesuit missionary in China, Andrius Rudamina, arrived in India in Goa on 22 August 1625. Almost 400 years later, 2015, a memorial stone bearing Andrius Rudamina's name was erected in the courtyard of Se Cathedral in Old Goa.

== Architecture ==
The architecture style of the Se Cathedral is Portuguese-Manueline. The exterior is Tuscan, whereas the interior is Corinthian. The church is 250 feet (76 m) in length and 181 feet (55 m) in breadth. The frontispiece stands 115 feet (35 m) high.

== Inside the cathedral ==
The Se Cathedral's tower houses a large bell known as the "Golden Bell" on account of its rich tone. It is said to be the largest in Goa, and one of the best in the world. The main altar is dedicated to Catherine of Alexandria, and there are several old paintings on either side of it. On the right there is a Chapel of the Cross of Miracles, where a vision of Christ is said to have appeared in 1619. There are six main panels, on which scenes from the life of Saint Catherine are carved. There is a huge gilded reredos above the main altar.

The Se Cathedral also houses a baptismal font made in 1532 which was used by Saint Francis Xavier in order to baptise several Goan converts.

== Gallery ==
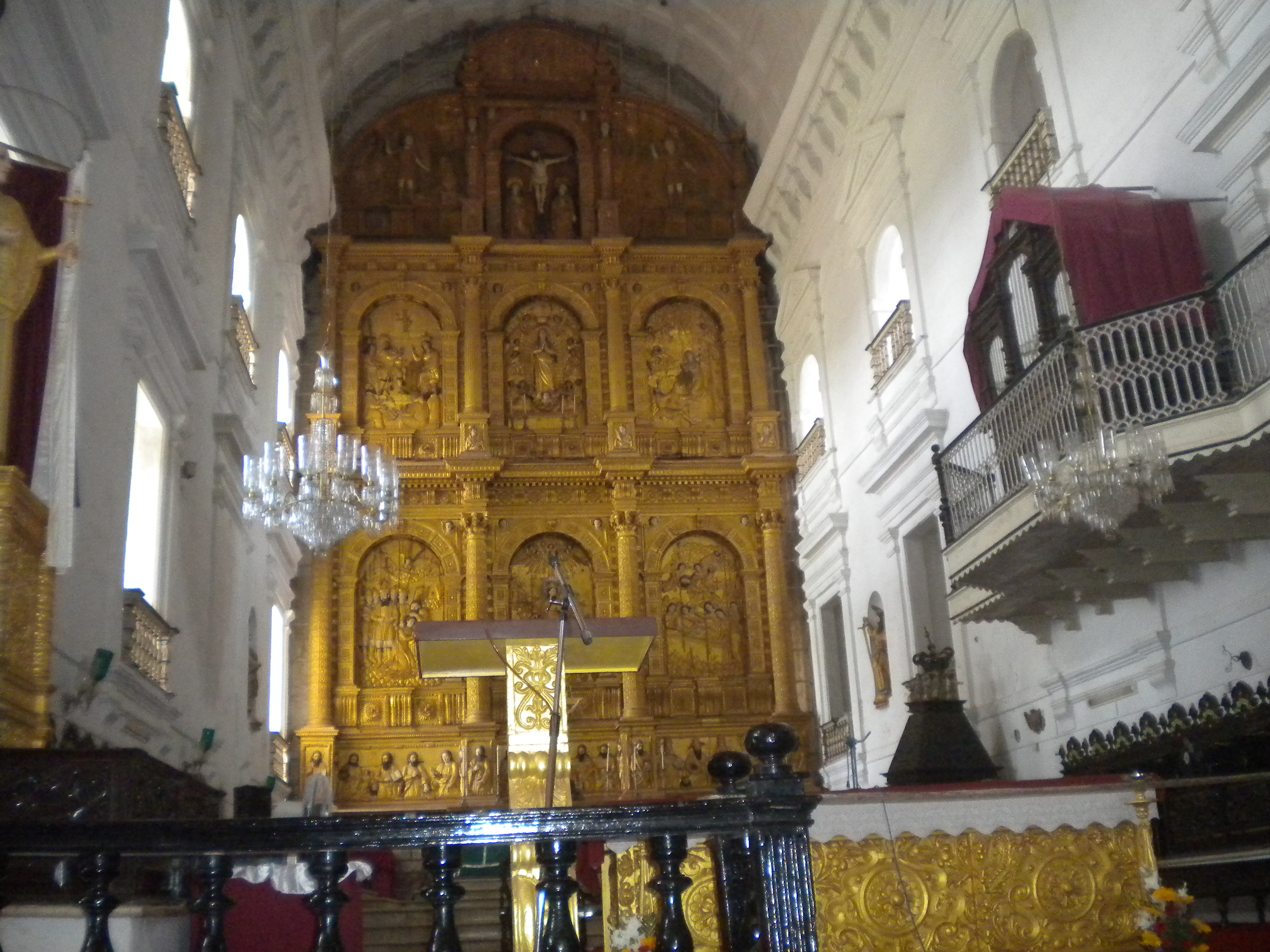
Altar

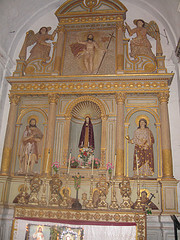
Altar detail

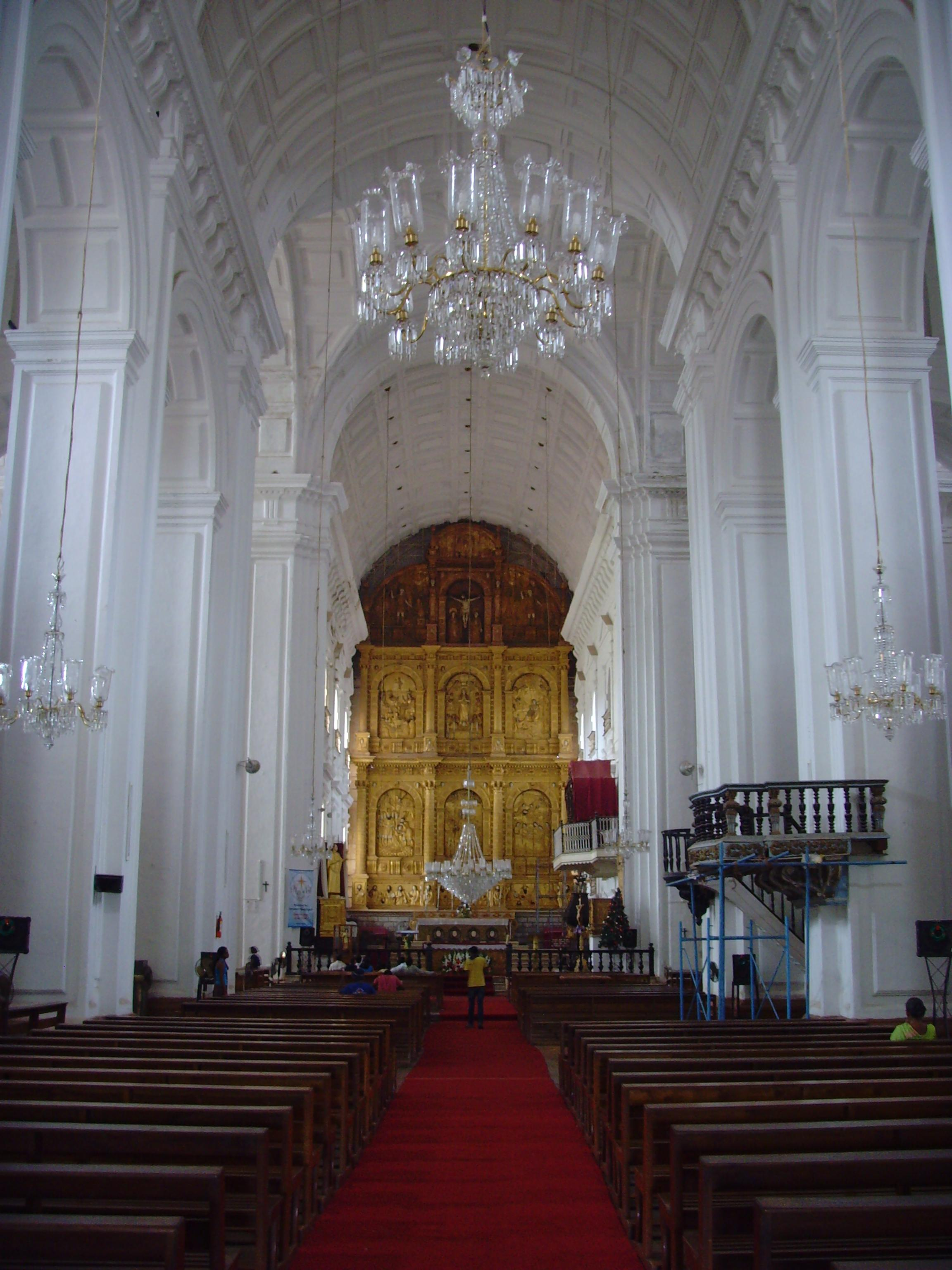
Interior view towards Reredos

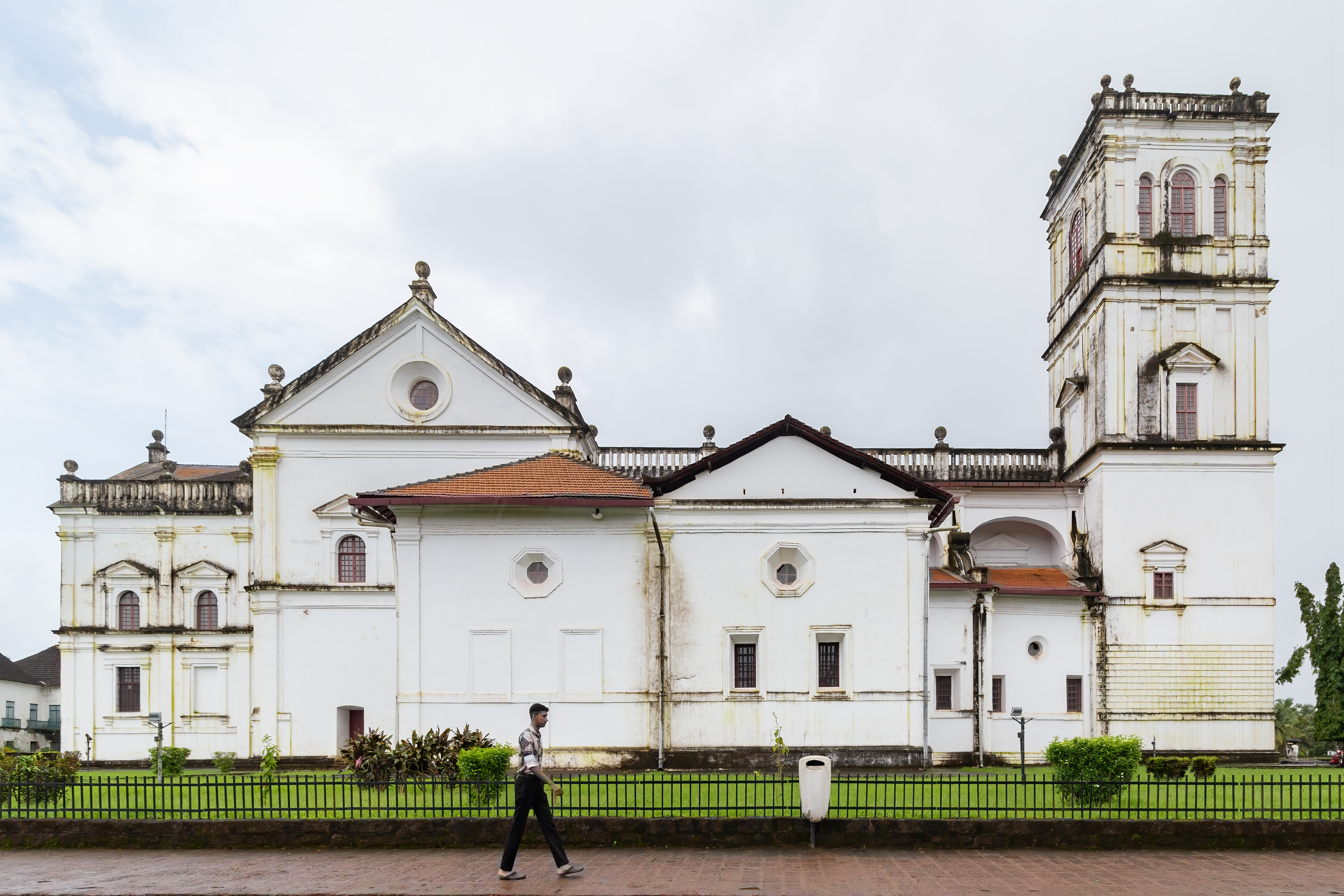
Side view

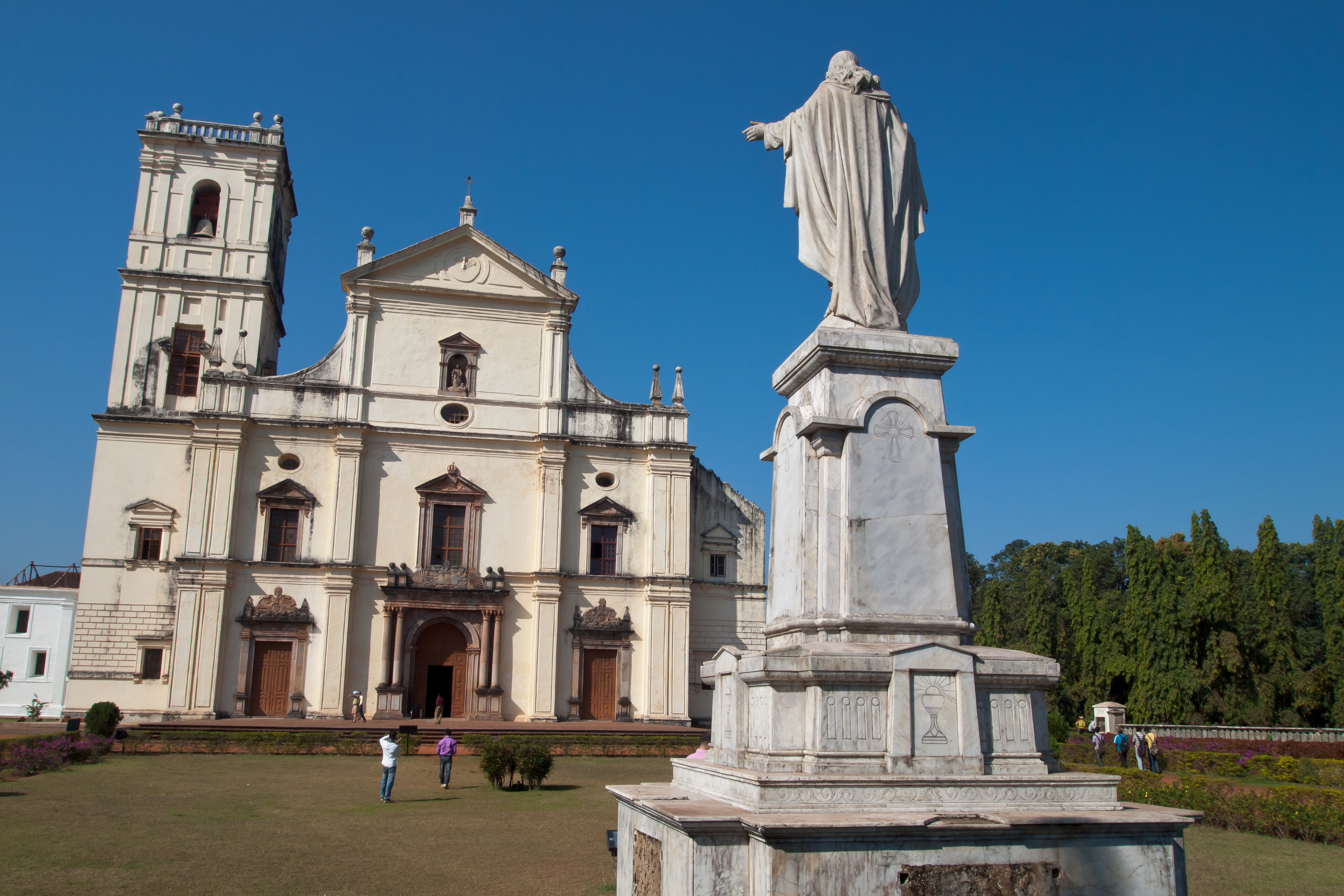
Front view

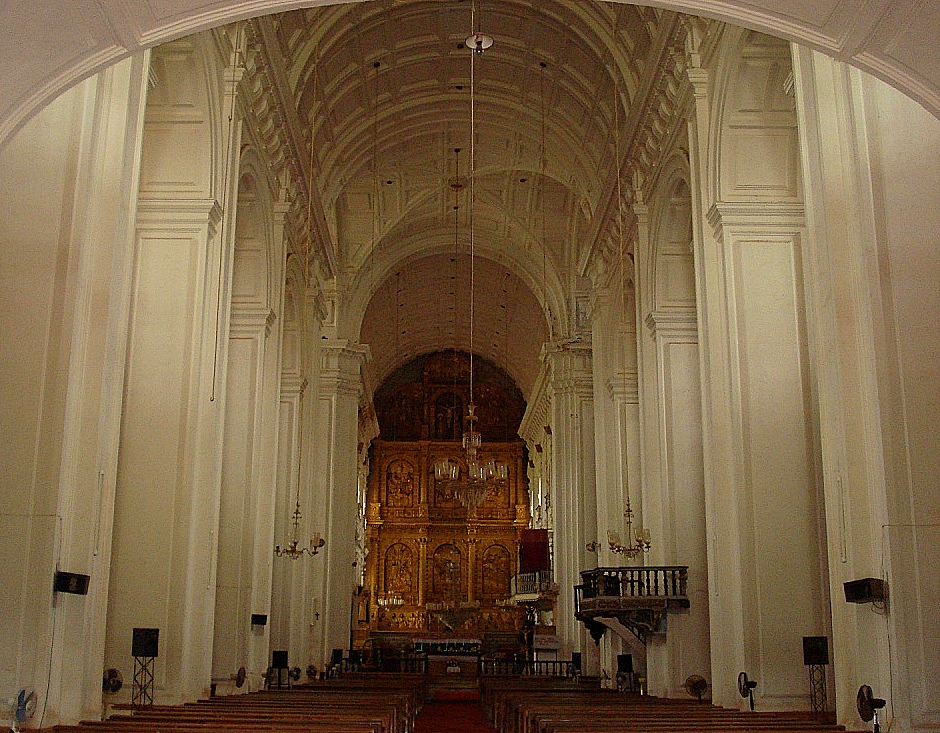
Interior view

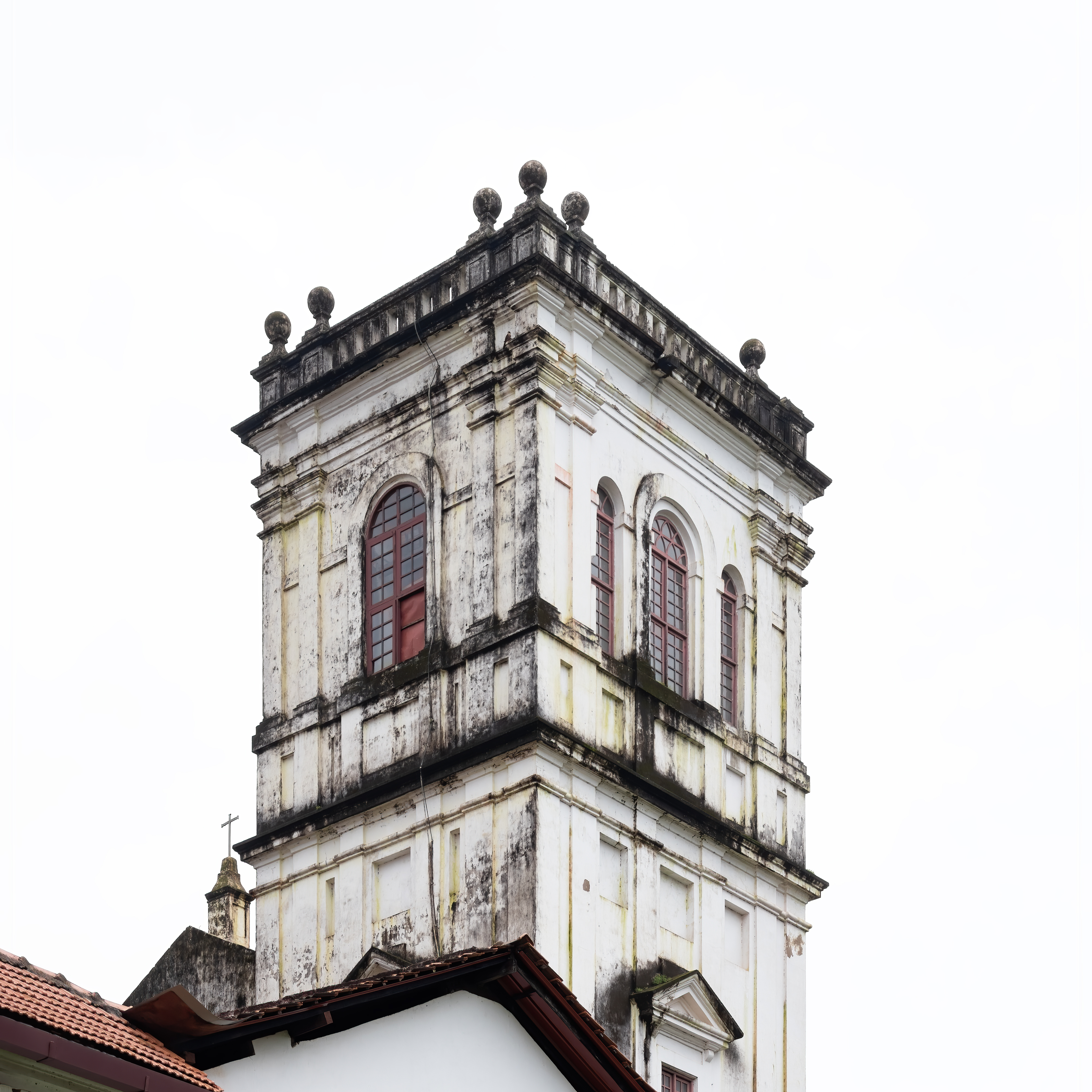
Bell Tower

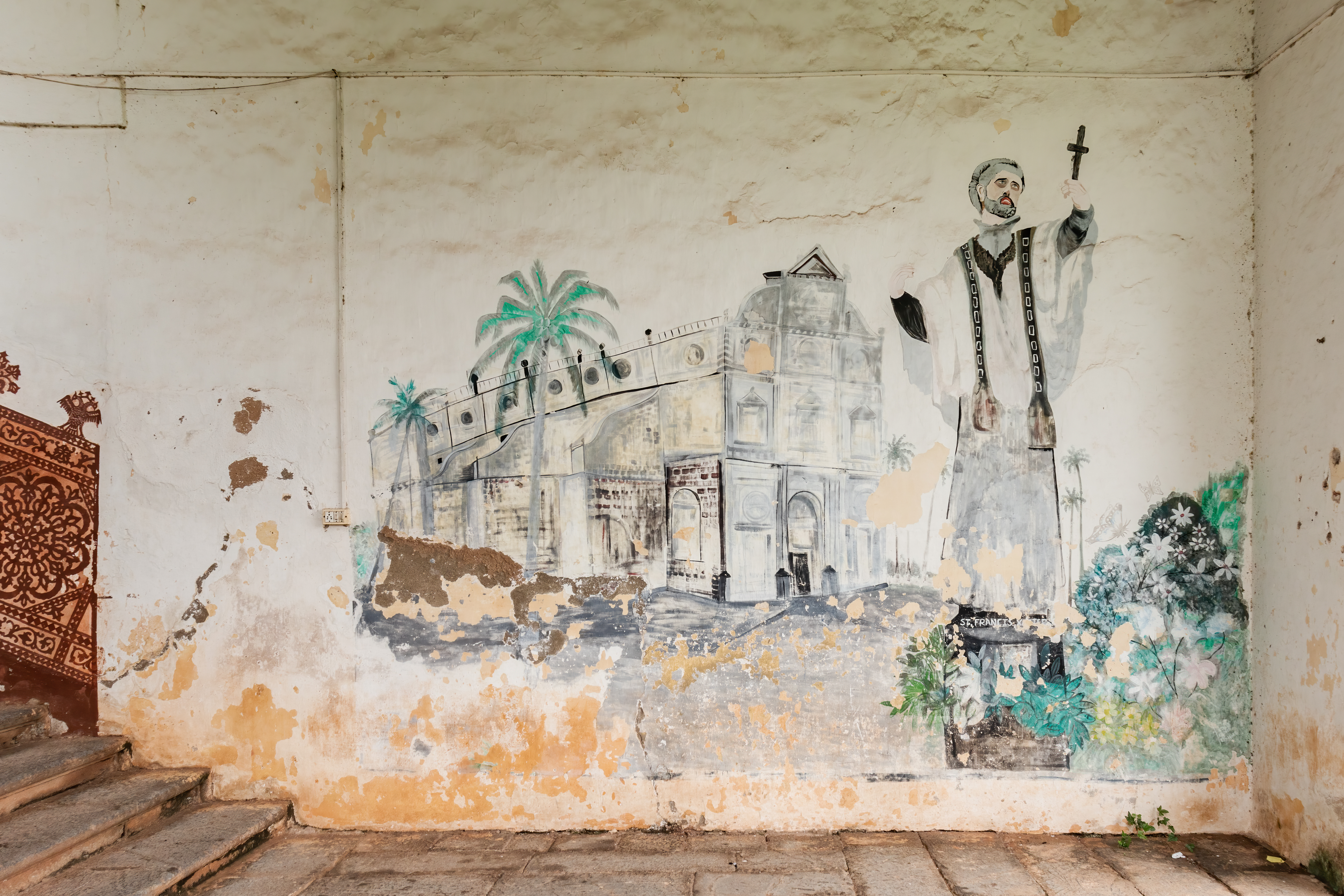
Painting on the walls

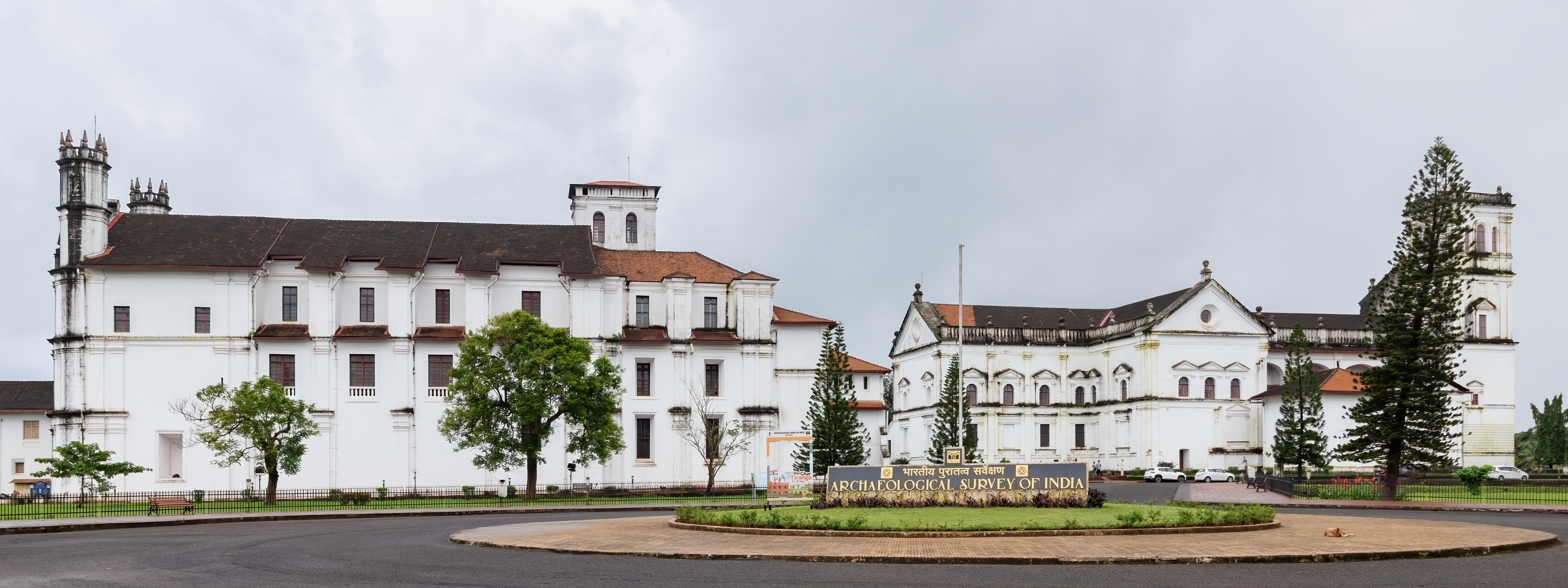
Church of St. Francis of Assisi and Se Cathedral

== See also ==
- Basilica of Bom Jesus
