= Associação Maritima e Colonial =

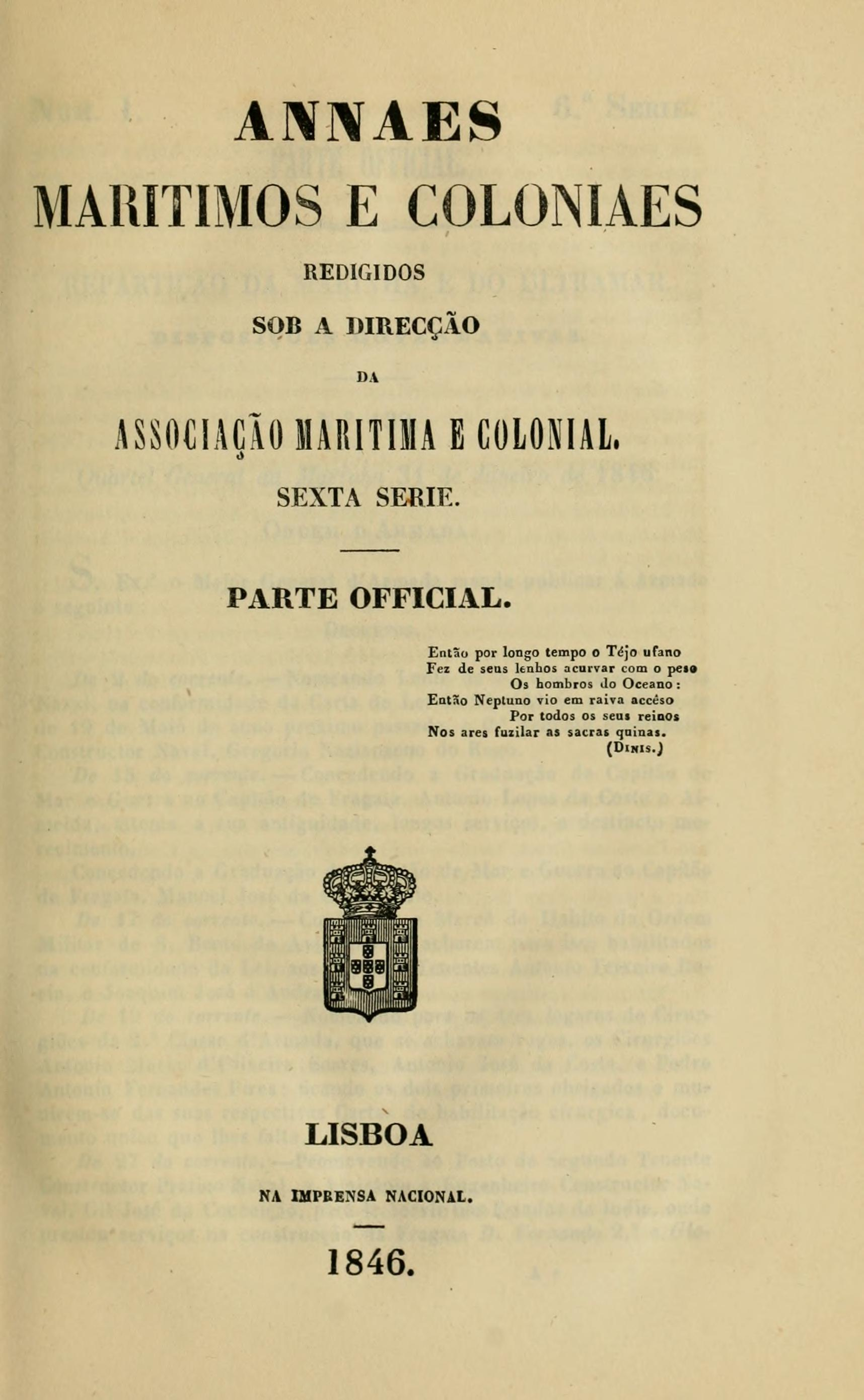
Annaes Maritimos e Coloniaes, 1846

The Associação Maritima e Colonial (Maritime and Colonial Association) of Portugal formed in 1839. Officials included Joaquim Jose Goncalves de Mattos Correia, Joaquim Jose Cecilia Kol, and José Xavier Bressane Leite. In the 1840s it issued a monthly journal, Annaes Maritimos e Coloniaes.

== Bibliography ==
- Associação Maritima e Colonial (ed.), Annaes Maritimos e Coloniaes (in Portuguese), Lisbon: Imprensa Nacional – via HathiTrust. 1840-
- José Silvestre Ribeiro [in Portuguese] (1879). "Associação Maritima e Colonial". Historia dos estabelecimentos scientificos, litterarios e artisticos de Portugal (in Portuguese). Vol. 6. Lisbon: Academia Real das Sciencias. pp. 230–234. OCLC 2753153 – via Internet Archive.
