= Domingos Torrado =

Roman Catholic prelate (1555–1612)

Most Reverend Domingos Torrado da Trinidade
- Titular Bishop of Fisicula; Auxiliary Bishop of Goa
- Church: Catholic Church
- Archdiocese: Archdiocese of Goa
- In office: 1605–1612

Orders
- Consecration: 13 Apr 1608 by Alexeu de Jesu de Meneses

Personal details
- Born: 1555 Elvas, Portugal
- Died: December 30, 1612 (aged 56–57) Goa

Domingos Torrado, O.S.A. (1555–1612) was a Roman Catholic prelate who was named as Titular Bishop of Fisicula (1605–1612). He is also known as Domingos Terrado or Domingos da Trinidade.

== Biography ==
Domingos Torrado da Trinidade was born in Elvas, Portugal in 1555 and ordained a priest in the Order of Saint Augustine. He served as vicar general of his congregation. He traveled to Asia where he founded a convent in Colombo. On 7 Feb 1605, he was appointed during the papacy of Pope Clement VIII as Titular Bishop of Fiscula and auxiliary Bishop of the Archdiocese of Goa (some sources name him as titular bishop of Salé). On 13 Apr 1608, he was consecrated bishop by Alexeu de Jesu de Meneses, Archbishop of Goa. In 1610, de Meneses returned to Europe and Torrado served as administrator of the Archdiocese. On 21 January 1612, Pope Paul V separated the east coast of Africa (from the Cape of Guardafui in the north to the Cape of Good Hope in the south) from the territory of the Archdiocese of Goa creating a separate ecclesiastical territory (prelature nullius) and named Torrado as the first Administrator of the Prelature of Mozambique. He never succeeded as Administrator of Mozambique as he died on 30 Dec 1612 in Goa.

== External links and additional sources ==
- Cheney, David M. "Fisicula (Titular See) Fisiculensis Suppressed". Catholic-Hierarchy.org. ^{[self-published]}
- Chow, Gabriel. "Bishops who are not Ordinaries: Bishop Domingos Torrado, O.E.S.A." GCatholic.org. ^{[self-published]}

Catholic Church titles
Preceded by	Titular Bishop of Fisicula; 1605–1612	Succeeded by
Preceded by	Auxiliary Bishop of Goa; 1605–1612	Succeeded by
Preceded by	Administrator of Goa; 1612	Succeeded by
Preceded by	Administrator-Elect of the Prelature of Mozambique; 1612	Succeeded by
