= Asia Urbs =

Humanitarian development programme

The Asia Urbs Programme was a humanitarian development programme, funded by EuropeAid Co-operation Office of the European Commission. It aims at a decentralised (city-to-city) cooperation between Europe and Asia. Established in 1998. The programme provided grants to local governments, non-governmental organizations for every aspect of urban life and municipal planning developing.

The budget is € 33.2 million (first phase) and €10 million (second phase, from 2004). The programme involved many of the Asian countries, including China, Cambodia, India, Vietnam, Thailand, Bangladesh, and others.

== Objectives ==
- Promote mutual understanding between Asia and Europe,
- Support the alleviation of poverty,
- Develop economic partnerships.

== Key areas of cooperation ==
- Urban management
- Urban socio-economic development
- Urban environment
- Urban social infrastructure

The programme was closed for proposals in 2005, but some of its projects were still ongoing as of 2007.
