= Chapel of Sacra Familia (Chorão Island) =

Chapel of the Holy Family
- Capela da Sagrada Família
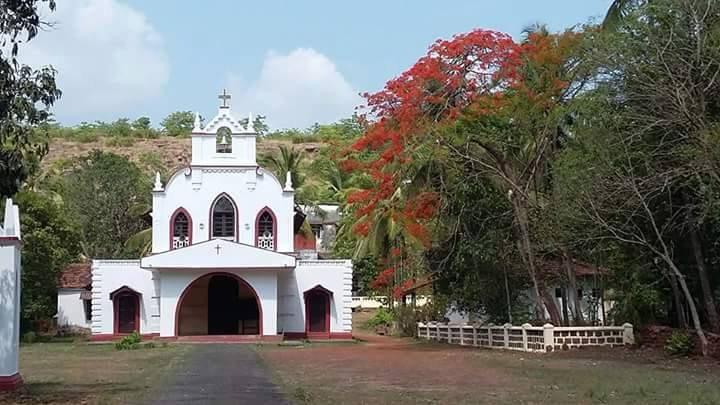
- Capela da Sagrada Família
- Chapel of the Holy Family
- 15.557°N 73.885°E
- Location: Chorão, Goa
- Country: India
- Denomination: Roman Catholic

History
- Status: Chapel
- Founded: 1769; 257 years ago
- Dedication: Holy Family

Administration
- Archdiocese: Archdiocese of Goa and Daman

The Capela da Sagrada Família (Chapel of the Holy Family) is a Roman Catholic chapel built in 1769 on the island of Chorão, Goa.

== History ==
The Capela da Sagrada Família, Pandavaddo, Chorão was built on a plot gifted by John Pereira and funded by Fr. Honorio Vincente Pereira of Pandavaddo (ord. 23-9-1769). The provision of 1 September 1769 granted permission for the construction of this chapel. Fr. Pereira was appointed its first Chaplain by a notification of 5 November 1771. He also served as the administrator of the chapel and finally handed over charge to the people of the village.

The chapel was erected on 12 October 1782 and rebuilt by the Provision of 17 December 1876. It was reconstructed for the second time and the Vicar General of the Archdiocese, Mons Pedro Remigio dos Baretto blesses it on 3 May 1918.

The chapel has four altars dedicated to the Holy Family (Main Altar), Sacred Heart of Jesus, Sacred Heart of Mary, and Our Lady of Fatima.

The Confraternity of the Holy Family established by a decree. No 5 of 14th Feb 1912, with its rules published in the Boletim Official No. 85 of 1920 and approved in 1924. The present one has been approved by a decree of 2-4-1945. There is also a Confraternity of Christian Doctrine established by a decree No.107 of 7-10-1955.

Mass is said daily in the chapel and it has a resident Chaplain.

== See also ==
- Capela de Nossa Senhora da Saúde
- Chapel of St. Jerome (Chorão Island)
