= Locu Sinai =

Portuguese tax collector

Chief Tax Collector
- Preceded by: Crishna

Village Judicial Authority

Personal details
- Born: Before 1527 Chorão, Sultanate of Bijapur
- Died: After 1555
- Spouse: Donna Isabel
- Relatives: Garcia de Sá (godfather)

Lucas de Sá (born Locu Sinai) was a Portuguese tax collector. Born in a Gaud Saraswat Brahmin family of high social status, they would later convert to become Christian Brahmins on the islet of Chorão, in Portuguese Goa. Nothing is known about his birth or death. The oldest document mentions his name first in the year 1527 and it is certain that in 1555 he was still living. The Portuguese referred to him as O Comprido (Indo-Portuguese; "the tall one").

== Biography ==
In the history of the Christianization of Goa, one noteworthy feature is the conversion of Locu, known as "the Greatest Giant of the Goan Brahmin Community".

Locu was one of the three most important and influential Brahmins from the Island of Chorão. One of these three named Crishna was the Tanador-mor (Village Judicial Authority) and Locu and Gopu were the other two. All these three held the first place among the Gauncares of Chorão. Locu was the rendeiro-mor (chief tax collector) of Goa and this important post was held in the same high esteem as the one of tanador-mor and therefore Crishna who was the Tanador-mor and Locu both officials enjoyed great prestige and had a powerful influence on the Gauncars to the extent of dissuading them from becoming Christians. Hence they were a great obstacle to evangelization in Goa, as is recorded in a letter written to King John III of Portugal by Martin Afonso de Melo on 6 November 1541.

=== Conversion to Christianity ===
Locu was affluent and rich but wars reduced him to poverty and as he was unable to meet his commitments to the Treasury (the income of three years 3,500 pardaus accruing from the provinces of Salsette and Bardes, he was put in jail. Conveniently, a few days later Locu called for Fr. Antonio Gomes and asked to be baptized. This was an elegant way out of his difficult situation and the pending court cases for corruption, bribery and failure to pay his leaseholder obligations.

According to Bishop of Goa João Afonso de Albuquerque the "whip" of poverty and want was sent by God to move Locu's heart. His baptism took place on Sunday, 30 September 1548. Fr Gaspar Berze (Barzeu) says in his letter "The baptism took place in our college on a Sunday with a solemn mass and sermon. The Governor of Portuguese India Garcia de Sá stood as godfather whilst the baptising minister was Bishop Albuquerque himself. Locu took the surname of his sponsor and was christened by the name of Lucas de Sá. His wife took the name of Donna Isabel and his nephew was named Dom Antonio. They were then carried on horse-back accompanied by all important people of the place who had come for the occasion and also by many Brahmins and they wended their way to the house of Rui Guimarães and celebrated the occasion in a festive way. The whole city appeared to be celebrating a grand feast with the branches of pine trees at the church square of Rossio, Lisbon on Easter Sunday. For the Glory of God, the festival was kept on for one full week. The Brahmins stated that since the father had turned a Christian, his sons too would do the same. As for Locu he said that "more people would become Christians than the hair on his head".

Locu rode on a well-dressed horse and with an escort consisting of the Portuguese Grandees went through the streets of the city which were well decorated and ornamented, receiving vivas from the people whilst at the same time the bells were ringing merrily. The artillery too joined in the citywide rejoicing, but the most gratifying sounds to be heard were the voices of the Brahmins who, since their chief had turned a Catholic, thought that they too would do the same, and actually it did not take long for many to follow his example.

A letter (till now extant) written on 13 December 1548 by Fr. Gaspar Berze, S.J to the Jesuits in Coimbra registers the following "This Locu was a very wealthy man. Every year his property gave him 6,000 pardaus; he was very well treated by the Portuguese, performed on their behalf a lot of good work and was so liberal, that he was supposed to be spending 1,000 pardaus, distributing much in alms giving. One of the things that God must have taken into account for him to become a Christian must have been his good deeds.

=== Village judicial authority ===
On the recommendation of Bishop Albuquerque Locu was appointed Tanador-mor (Village Judicial Authority); in addition to this many honors, privileges and favours were conferred upon him. But it must be added that the case against him continued.

== Descendants ==
Due to the Chorão epidemic in the 18th century, Locu's descendants left for Calangute in 1762 and settled there permanently in 1772. Among the direct male descendants there have been many priests, lawyers and doctors. Dr. Luis José Bras de Sà, the former Health officer of Bardes, belonged to this family.
