= Epidemics in Chorão Island =

Disease outbreak in Goa, India

Coordinates: 15°32′23″N 73°53′11″E

The Chorão Epidemic killed over a thousand people in Chorão, an island along the Mandovi River near Ilhas, Goa, India. It also caused thousands to flee the island, and led to the closure of Real Colégio de Educação de Chorão in 1859. The epidemic and its after-effects left the island deserted for almost 100 years.

== History ==
In the Second half of 18th century the population of Chorão reached its peak, at 22,000 inhabitants; with roughly 8000 in the parish of Our Lady of Grace Church.

It is believed that the epidemic started in the year 1766 but that its consequences came into full swing in 1775. The epidemic is believed to have first started in the Parish of Our Lady of Grace Church in June 1775, rapidly spreading throughout the Island, especially in the village of Querem, largely wiping out the once highly populated area. In the Our Lady of Grace Church, within a period of less than six months the congregation declined from 8000 to 1700. Many fled the Island but some remained; unwilling to leave the land of their ancestors.

In 1808, Chorão was granted permission by the Portuguese Government to construct new houses to attract immigration. Years later, between 1809 and 1812 there was an attempt to enter the names of the newcomers in the book of Joneiros, though this was largely unsuccessful due to the epidemic.

According to French traveller Denis Louis Cottineau de Kloguen who visited the Island: "Chorão Island was formerly pretty populous, but is now almost deserted, being deemed very unhealthy: the whole number of individuals on the Island is about one hundred and fifty".

According to José Nicolau Da Fonseca: "Chorão Island once had many villas owned by Portuguese grandees but the island is now almost deserted, on account of its insalubrity.

After a lapse of many years the fever re-appeared in Chorão Island in 1878, increasing the toll of human life.

== Causes ==
The epidemic was attributed to many causes: among them was the absence of free ventilation of air which was stifled and vitiated by dense willows on one side and on the other by hill that obstructed the houses; warm and heavy air caused by rocks and scarcity of good drinking water during hot seasons, which obliged the people to have to drink well water, at a time when most of the wells were contaminated.

== Diaspora ==
Many have emigrated in search of higher employment, allowing the economy of Chorão island to recover somewhat.
