= Rogério de Faria =

Portuguese-Brazilian businessman (1770–1848)

Sir Rogério de Faria
- Born: 14 October 1770; Chorão, Goa, Portuguese India
- Died: 15 March 1848 (aged 77); Bombay, Bombay Presidency, British India
- Occupation: Businessman

Sir Rogério de Faria (14 October 1770 — 15 March 1848) was a Portuguese-Brazilian businessman.

== Early life ==
Sir Rogério de Faria, also known as Sir Roger Faria, was a native of Chorão Island, son of Joao de Faria and Ana Maria D'Albuquerque e de Faria. The family migrated to Bombay, British India after epidemics in Chorão Island in 1775. A Goan Catholic in international business, he was a pioneer in the opium trade in China, long before the British thought of entering this branch of commerce.

== Consul of Brazil in Bombay ==
De Faria was known in Bombay and internationally as a "prince merchant". A resident of Bombay, where he was Consul of Brazil, de Faria did business in Bengal, Bombay and Macau. He was a big supporter of fellow Goan mayor Bernardo Peres da Silva, who had been appointed governor of Goa by the liberal government of Dom Pedro IV of Portugal, but rejected by the military stationed in Goa. This was unacceptable to Sir Roger Faria because Da Silva was the first native born Portuguese Governor. Sir Roger Faria staked his fortune unsuccessfully on a naval expedition thwarted by heavy monsoons to restore Bernardo Peres da Silva to the post of Portuguese Governor of India.

== Biographies ==
According to historian Teotonio de Souza, he accessed part of de Faria's business correspondence dating back to 1789–1830, involving dealings with the Mhamai Kamat House in Portuguese Goa. De Souza suggests that the pre-1818 papers offer "much interesting information" that could help correct and supplement "whatever we know about Rogerio de Faria from a few contemporary published sources and from a few late and sketchy biographies."

Abbé Cottineau's Journal describes Sir Rogerio Faria's house as "commanding a most lovely view of the sea, the ramparts, the suburbs, the city, the Colaba island, and the West coast as far as the so-called Malabar Point. cited by Souza).

De Souza says that Faria made his fortune in "opium-peddling", and writes: "We are not able to fully collaborate the statement, but we are told by the otherwise critical Indo-Portuguese administrator-historian, J.H. da Cunha-Rivara, that Sir Jamsetjee Jeejeebhoy, the most glamorous Parsee figures of the mid-nineteenth century in the annals of Bombay, started his prosperous career as a simple clerk in the firm of Rogerio de Faria. Reporting the death of Sir Roger's daughter, Miss Margaret de Faria, the Bombay Gazette of 7 October 1889 added that Sir Jamsetjee had made his first voyage to China in a ship belonging to Sir Roger de Faria."

Faria faced prohibitive financial losses, after the naval expedition he backed to restore Bernardo Peres da Silva, the first native-born Portuguese Governor, failed owing to an inclement and ruinous monsoon. His only son died of tetanus after an accidental fall, a couple of years before him in 1848. The Goan journalist-editor A.M. da Cunha wrote a 30-page booklet which Souza says "gives more details about the numerous progeny of Sir Roger than about him."

He lived out the rest of his life on a pension granted to him by his friend Sir Jamsetjee Jejeebhoy.

== Legacy ==
Naresh Fernandes writes in Bombaywallah.org: "Gloria Church in Byculla, Bombay, now known as Mumbai, contains a memorial stone to an almost-forgotten Bombay character: the Goan opium trader Sir Roger de Faria." His children married into other prominent Luso-Indian aristocratic families and his descendants continue to play prominent roles in Mumbai's politics and entertainment industry.
