= Garcia de Sá =

His Lordship Garcia de Sá
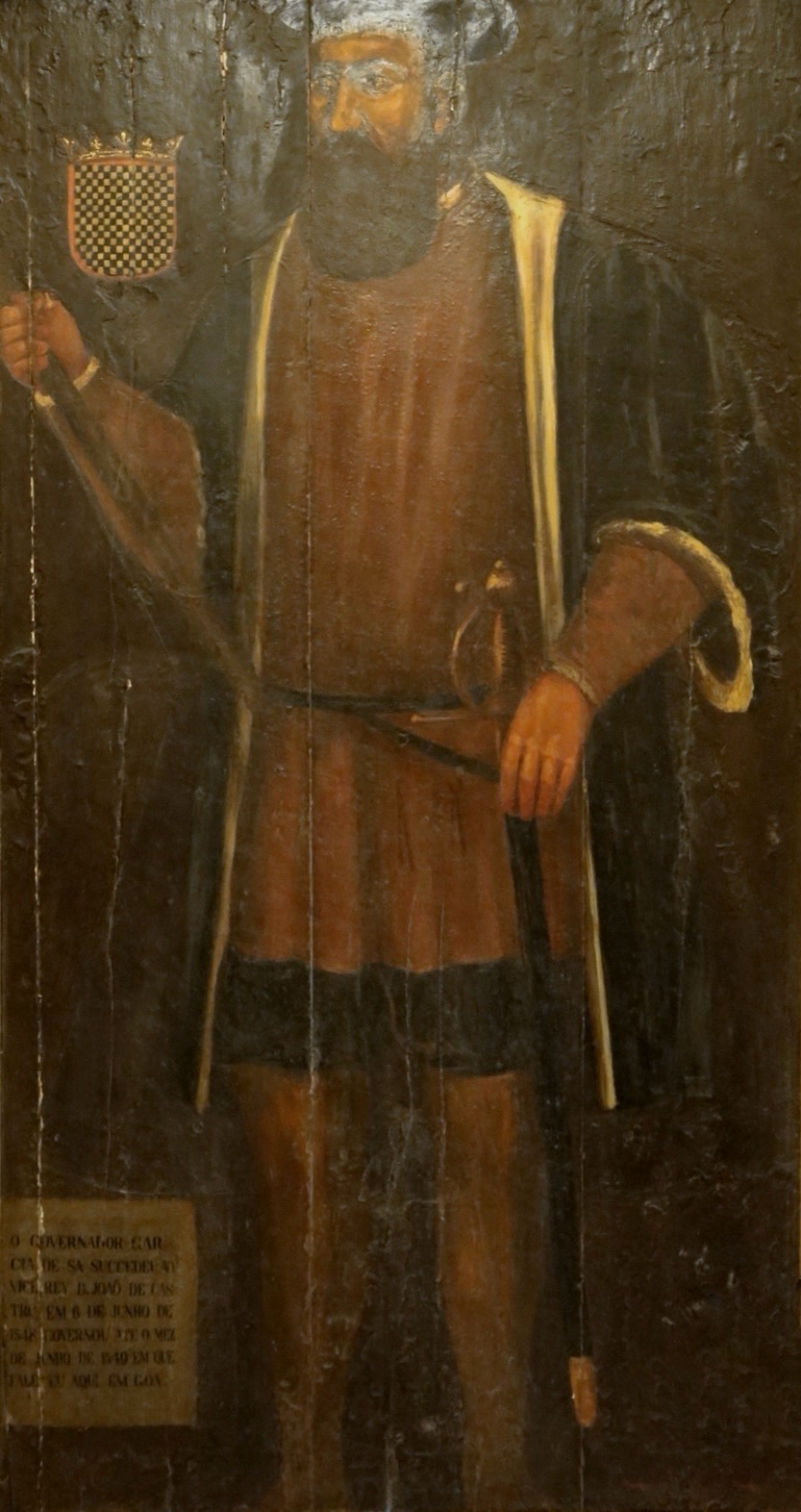

Governor of India
- In office 6 June 1548 – 13 June 1549
- Monarch: John III
- Preceded by: João de Castro
- Succeeded by: Jorge Cabral

Personal details
- Born: 1486 Porto, Kingdom of Portugal
- Died: 13 June 1549 (aged 62–63) Goa, Portuguese India
- Spouse: Catarina Pires
- Children: 2
- Relatives: Locu Sinai (godson)
- Occupation: Soldier (military officer), explorer, fidalgo of the Royal Household, Governor of Portuguese India
- Known for: Establishment of Portuguese naval hegemony in the Indian Ocean

Garcia de Sá (1486 – 13 June 1549) was a Portuguese nobleman, soldier (military officer), explorer, fidalgo of the Royal Household, who was the 14th ruler of Portuguese India as governor from June 1548 to 13 June 1549.

== Biography ==
=== Birth and parents ===
Garcia de Sá was born in a noble family in Porto, Portugal, around 1486. His father was João Rodrigues de Sá, senhor (lord) of Sever, who was a chamberlain-in-chief and fidalgo of the Board of Dom Afonso V. His mother was Dona Joana de Albuquerque.

His father had titles:

- Alcaide-in-chief of Porto for interest and the heraldry (16 June 1449)
- Senhor (lord) of Matosinhos, Sever, Barreiro, Paiva, Baltar, Gondomar, Aguiar de Sousa e Bouças (13 February 1459), etc..

His father had counties:

- Massarelos (15 March 1468),
- São João da Foz (29 December 1469),

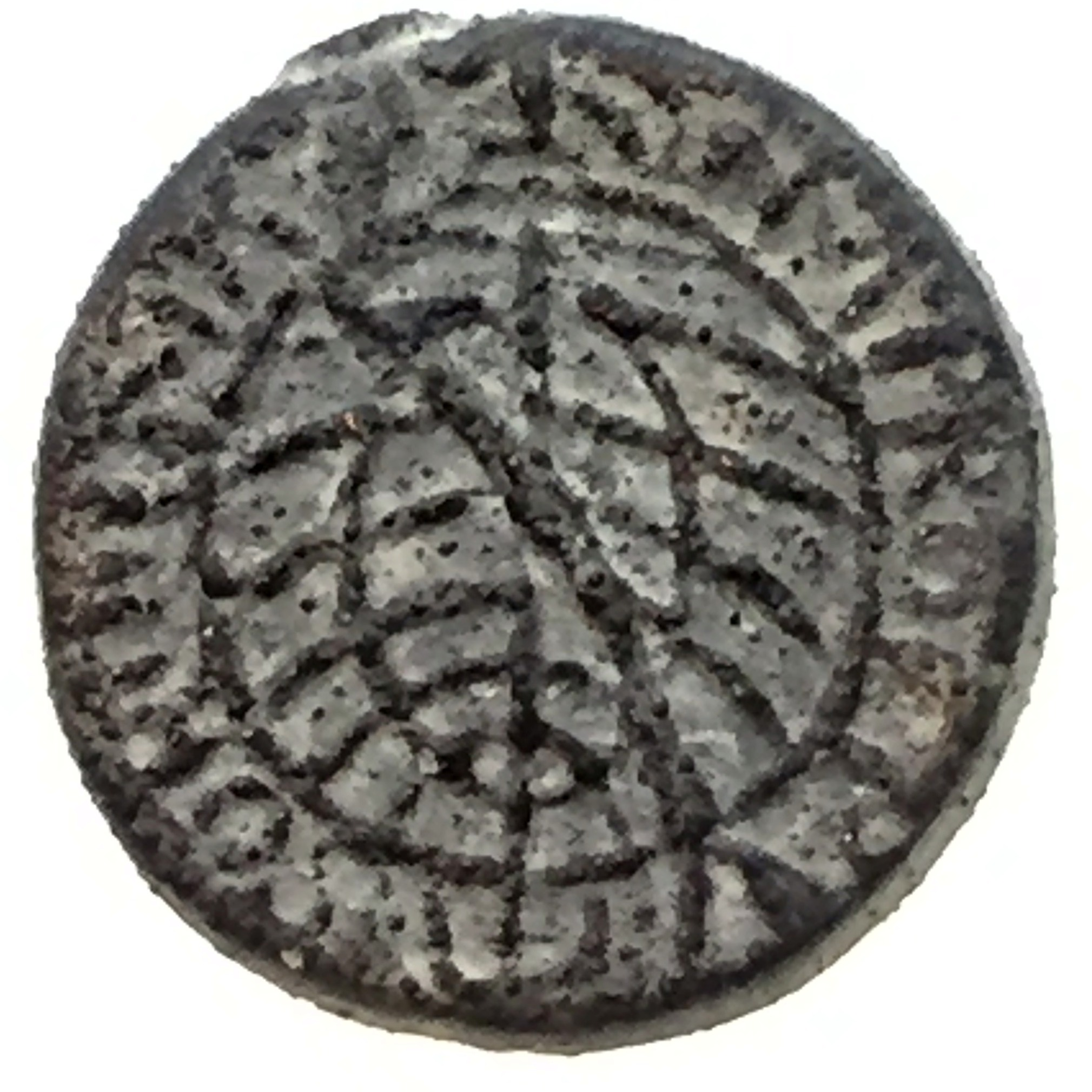

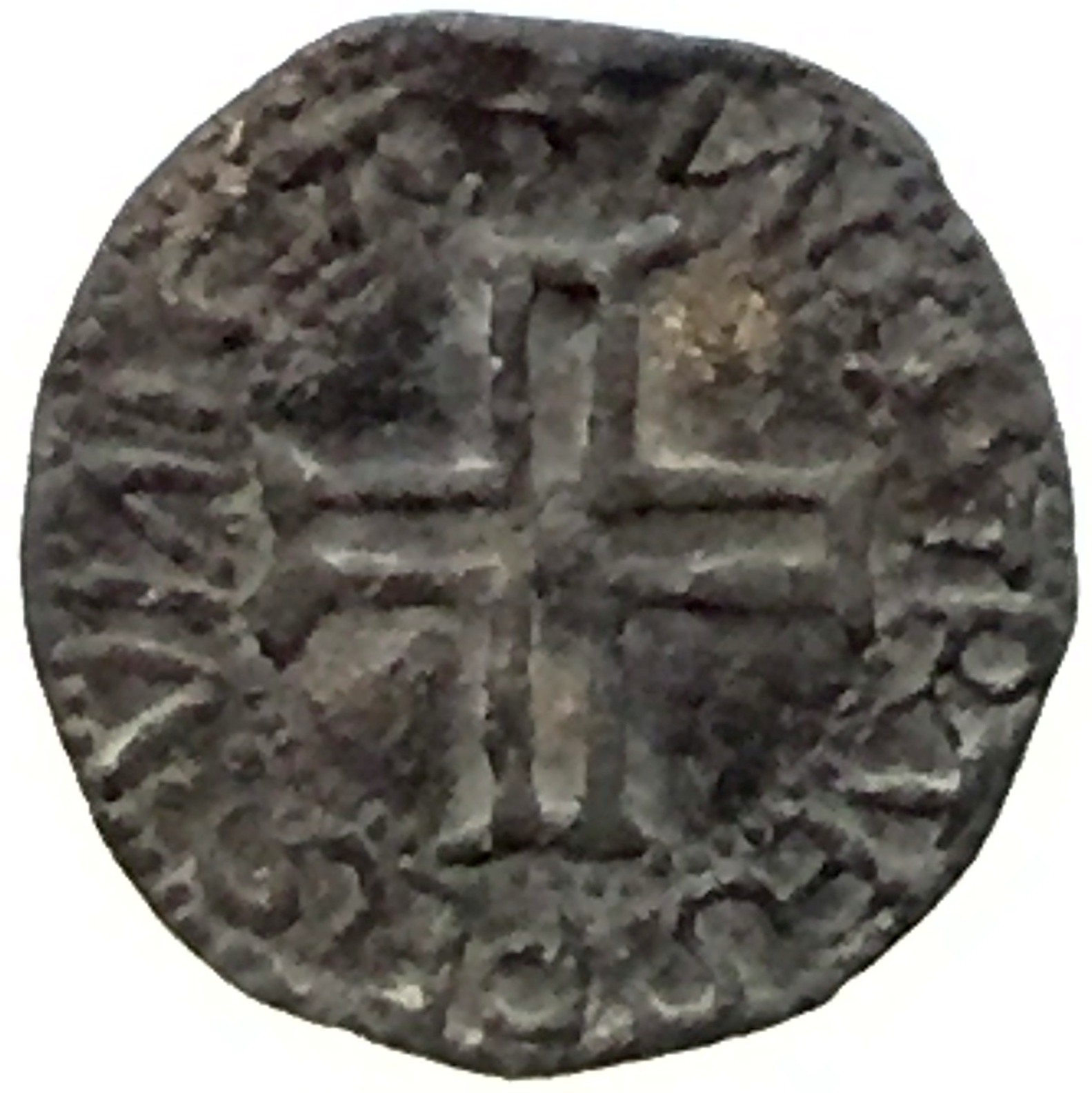
Portuguese Malacca currency that was minted during the reign of Manuel I, between 1505 and 1521. It was called 'bastard' and amounted to 60 real Portuguese. Collection of the Museu do Dinheiro of Lisbon.

His father was third time married Joana de Albuquerque with actual confirmation on 21 June 1484 and received her dowry the landlords of Gondomar and Aguiar de Sousa.

=== Career in Portuguese India ===
Dom Garcia de Sá first appeared in India in 1518 together with the new Governor of Portuguese India Diogo Lopes de Sequeira. In 1519-1521, he first time took the post of governor and captain-major of Malacca. On 28 June 1522 he second time took the post of governor and captain-major of Malacca.

In 1527 he commanded an armada which run to S. Miguel Islands.

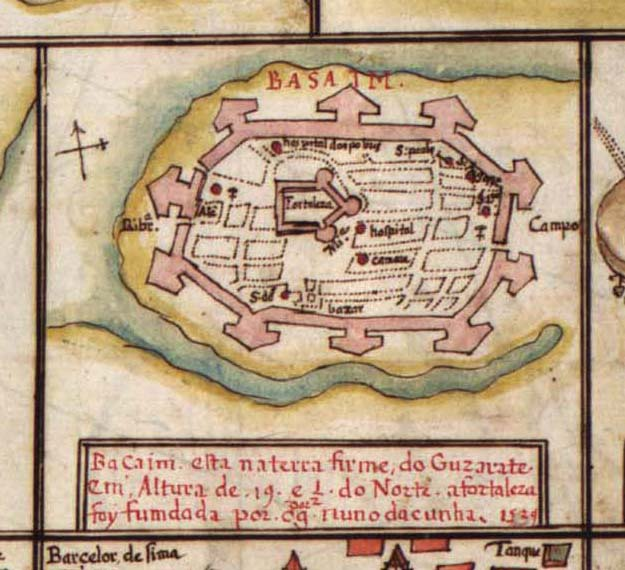
Map of Bassein (c. 1539), drawn by Nuno da Cunha, Governor of Portuguese India (1528-38).

Garcia de Sá made a great contribution to the restoration of the Fort of Diu after the siege of Diu by forces of the Ottoman Empire in 1538. One of the bastions of the Fort of Diu was even named in his honor, Bastion Garcia de Sá.

Garsia de Sá was also a captain of Bassein as mentioned after the Portuguese Malacca.

=== Illegal coinage ===
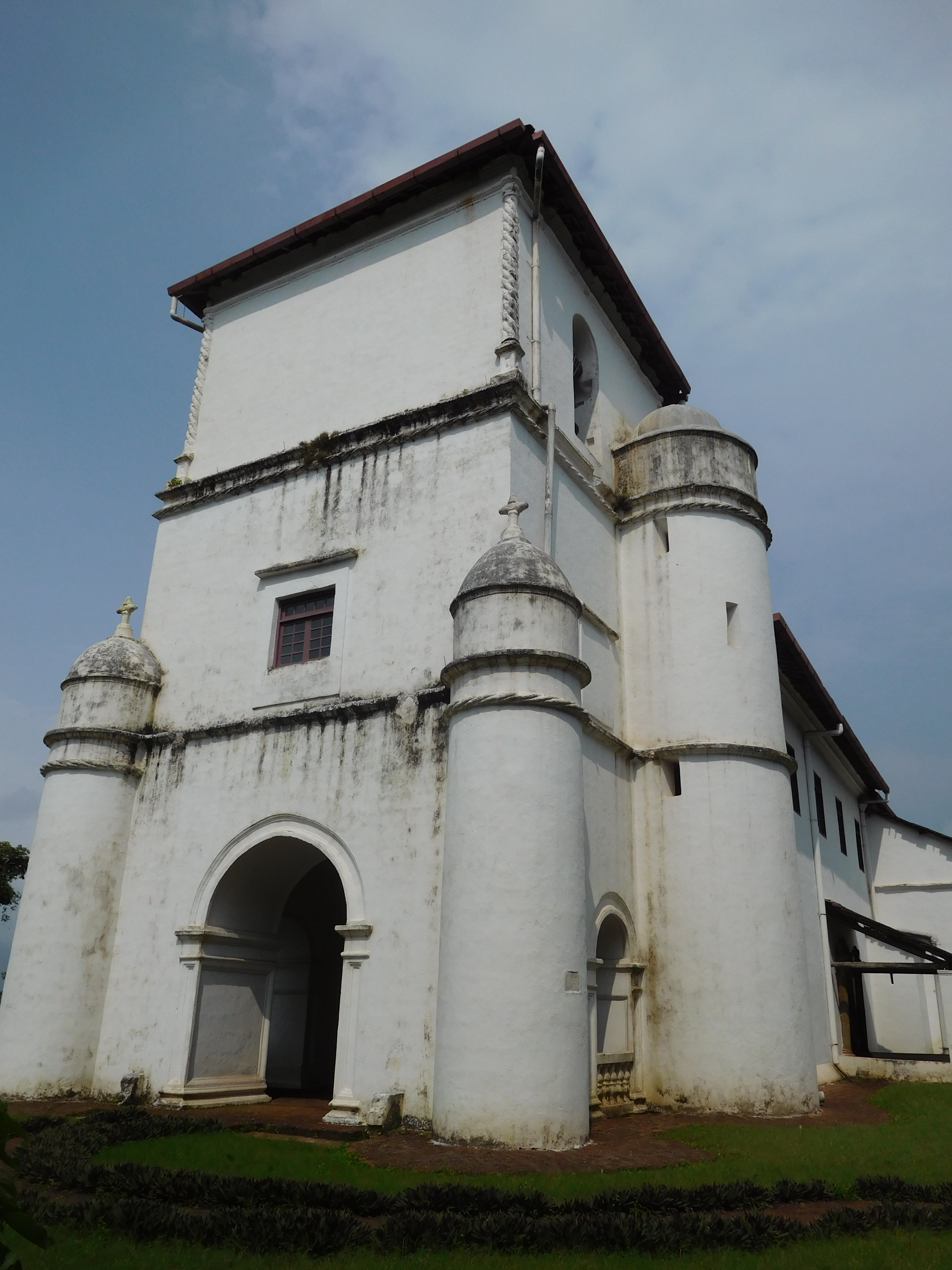
The church of Our Lady of the Rosary is the oldest church in Goa.

Garcia de Sá became famous when he was the captain of the Bassein and ordered to mint a certain amount of copper coins to facilitate local trade. The colony lacked any Portuguese money including local coins minted in Goa. And Garcia de Sá resolved to make such a desperate step, and almost paid with his career for it. Foes immediately denounced to the king João III (1502-1557, king from 1521 to 1557) regarding such a blatant violation of the Royal prerogatives as coinage, and order was sent to Portuguese India to arrest the captain Garcia de Sá, and regarding the confiscation of all his property. The former captain of Bassein had to be deported immediately to Lisbon. However, quite high-rank defenders in Portugal and in Portuguese India took part to protect Garcia de Sá: the order on seizure of Garcia de Sá property was ignored in Portuguese India, and Garcia was able to justify himself in front of the king in Portugal. As result, he had returned to Portuguese India as an honest man.

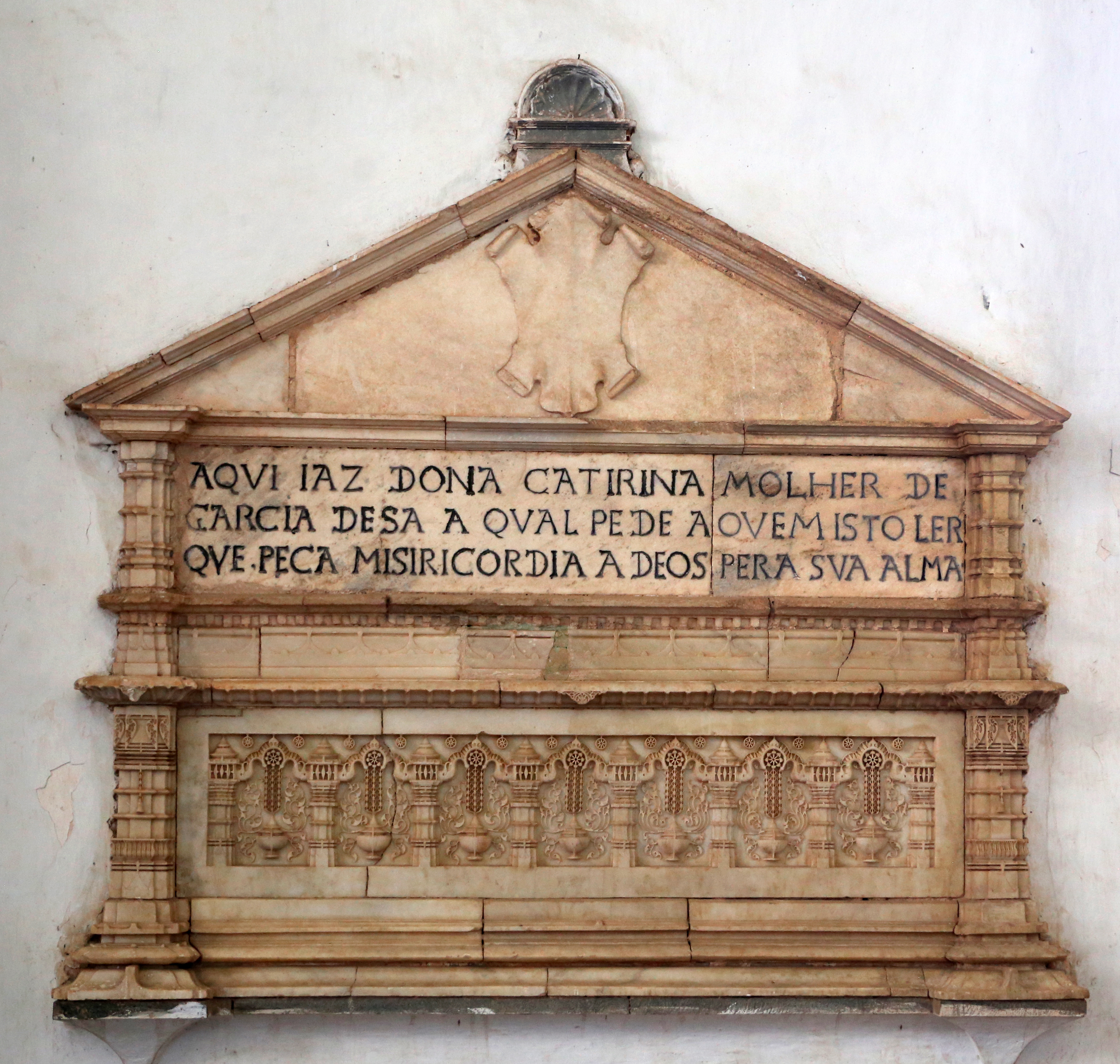
The epitaph ceremonial on the rich tomb, of white marble, in the wall of the chancel of the church of Our Lady of the Rosary, with the following inscription: "Here lies Catherine, the wife of Garcia de Sá which asks for whom it read that ask mercy to God for her soul."

=== Church and marriage ===
Garcia de Sá had married a local woman Catarina Pires, "the flower of Miragaia", portrayed by Camilo Castelo Branco. They had two daughters. His wife died in Goa in November 1546, and buried in a rich tomb, of white marble, in the wall of the chancel of the Church of Our Lady of the Rosary, in Goa. The following inscription is over her tomb: "Here lies Catarina, the wife of Garcia de Sá which asks for whom it read that ask mercy to God for her soul."

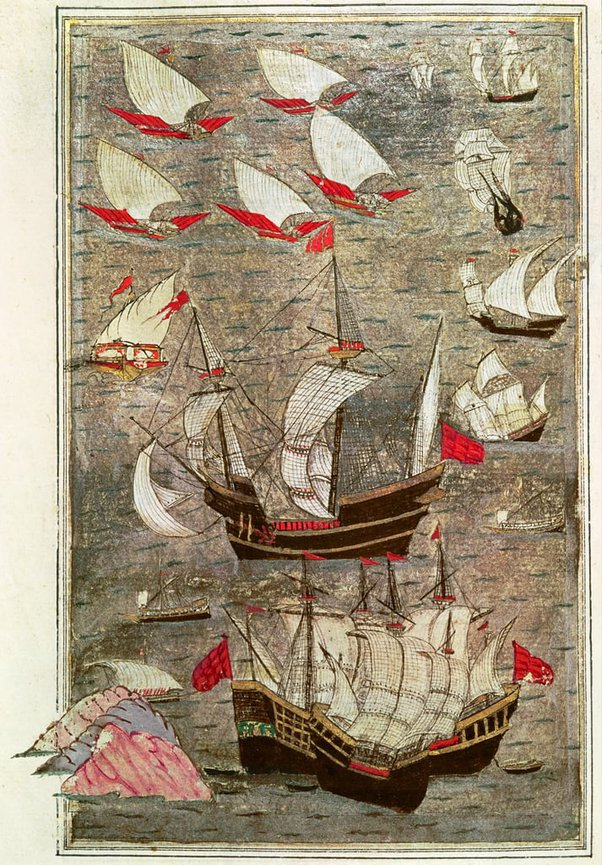
Ottoman fleet in the Indian Ocean in the 16th century

=== The threat of the Ottoman Empire ===
Reliable information from Portugal to Portuguese India and back has not received any more when the Portuguese lost their positions in Aden in 1548 due to the Ottoman Empire forces captured Aden in February 1548.

=== Governor of Portuguese India ===
After the death of the Viceroy of Portuguese India João de Castro in Goa on 6 June 1548, Garcia de Sá became the new Governor of Portuguese India in accordance with the administrative paperwork that was sent with the last ship from Portugal. He was largely supportive of many of the recommendations that were given to him at every opportunity, the previous ruler of Portuguese India João de Castro. So, Garcia de Sá was appointed as governor of Portuguese India in June, 1548.

Garcia de Sá did not embark on military adventures due to his advanced age, but he achieved significant successes through peaceful negotiations. The ruler of Bijapur Ibrahim Adil Shah I made peace with the Portuguese at the end of August 1548, he recognized all the commercial privileges and rights of the Portuguese to the districts of Bardez and Salcete, and Adil Shah freed also the Portuguese ambassador. On the contrary, the Portuguese pledged to inform Ibrahim Adil Shah I if Mir Ali left the territory of Goa.

In January 1549, Garcia de Sá concluded a peace treaty with Gujarat. This treaty was an exact copy of the previous treaty, but now the Portuguese pledged not to demolish the wall which separated their possessions in Diu from the rest of the city.

Union with the Raja of Tanur, who from time to time rebelled against Samorin, was less successful. Raja of Tanur wanted to enlist the support of the Portuguese in the war against the Samorin and even arrived in Goa in 1548 to be baptized. He also promised that all his subjects would convert to Christianity, but all this turned out to be just camouflage. But when Samorin began to collect an army for another war with the Portuguese in 1549, the Raja of Tanur provided all his troops at his disposal.

Garcia de Sá continued his financial policy when he became governor of Portuguese India. The local mint in Goa minted only copper and silver coins under a royal license. However, Garcia decided to improve a little the financial atmosphere in the Portuguese colonies and began the first gold European coins chasing in Portuguese India.

=== Death and afterword ===
Garcia de Sá died in Goa on June 13, 1549. After his death, the colony council offered Jorge Cabral the post of governor of Portuguese India, since his name was on the list of applicants for this position in an emergency situation.

It is obvious that Don Garcia initiative to mint the gold coins in Goa would have found his detractors, but Garcia de Sá premature death in 1549 stopped all such coin's initiatives and denunciations.

Several letters and orders has remained from Garcia de Sá, as governor and captain-general of Portuguese India, including the letters to the King and Secretary of State Pedro de Alcáçova Carneiro.

=== Descendants ===
Dom Garcia de Sá was married to a woman Catherine Pires, "the flower of Miragaia". They had two daughters, Dona Joana de Albuquerque and Dona Leonor de Sá. But Garcia de Sá managed to marry them successfully only during his governorship. Both daughters married the same day, at the Sé de Goa:

- Dona Joana married Dom António de Noronha (1517-1550), chief captain of the naval fleet of Portuguese India, son of the Viceroy Dom Garcia de Noronha and had issue.
- Dona Leonor (Leonora) married Manuel de Sousa de Sepúlveda. Both died in the aftermath of the shipwreck of São João off Natal, South Africa, Africa in 1552, which was written about in História trágico-marítima and in poetry by Luís de Camões.

García de Sá was lord of the Quinta da Quintã in Sardoura (Castelo de Paiva), term of the monastery of Vila Boa do Bispo, and it was given to his daughter Dona Leonor (Leonora) in dowry as per proxy made in Portuguese India to Diogo Brandão Sanches on 24 October 1549, registered in the term in 1552.

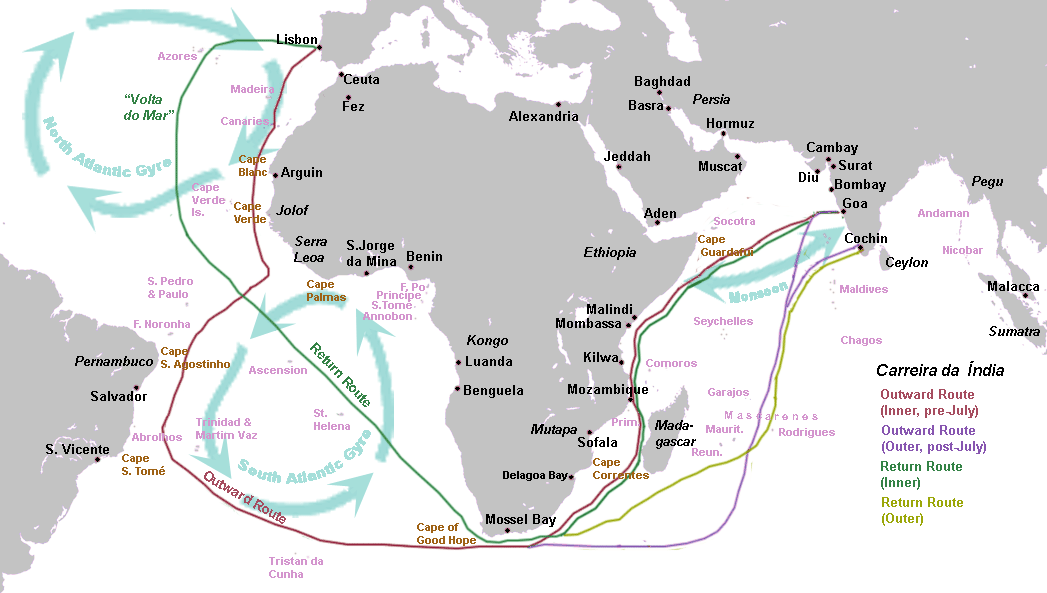
Outward and return voyages of the Portuguese India run (Carreira da Índia).

Preceded by João de Castro (1545 – 6 June 1548)	Governor of Portuguese India; Garcia de Sá (June 1548 - 13 June 1549)	Succeeded by Jorge Cabral (13 June 1549 – November 1550)
