= Fort São Bartolomeu =

Portuguese fort in Goa, India

- Fortaleza de São Bartolomeu
- Goa in India
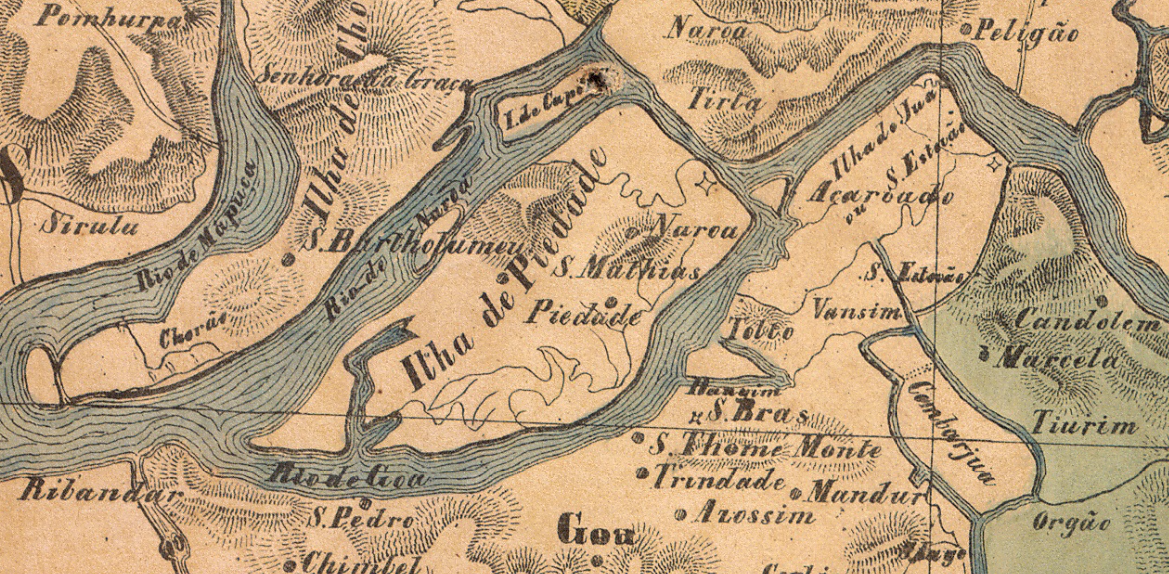
- Fort São Bartolomeu marked on an 1814 map, to the left of Ilha de Piedade.

Site history
- Built: 1720
- Built by: Portuguese Empire

The Fort São Bartolomeu (Fortaleza de São Bartolomeu in Portuguese) is a military structure erected on the northeast of the Chorão Island, in Goa. Presumed to have been originally built when Goa was ruled by the Muslim Bahmani Sultanate or the Sultanate of Bijapur, it was subsequently occupied and renamed by the Portuguese after the territory was conquered in 1510. The original structure was demolished and the new fort built in 1720.

It defended the fording point between the islands of Calvim and Penelem. It was equipped with 11 guns.

In 1811 it was in ruins.

== See also ==
- Portuguese India
- History of Goa
