= Chapel of St. Jerome (Chorão Island) =

Chapel in Goa, India

Coordinates: 15.5274526557°N 73.877886389°E

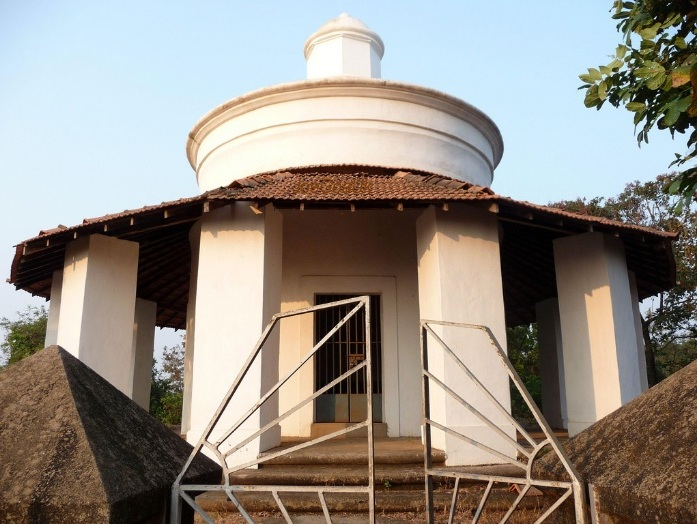
- Chapel of St. Jerome
- Location: Chorão, Goa
- Country: India
- Denomination: Roman Catholic

History
- Status: Chapel
- Founded: 1761; 265 years ago
- Dedication: Saint Jerome

Architecture
- Style: Greek

Administration
- Archdiocese: Archdiocese of Goa and Daman

The Chapel of St. Jerome is a historic Roman Catholic chapel on the island of Chorão in Goa, India. After closing of the Chorão Seminary, although it had been abandoned for centuries, the chapel still stands. Acoustic phenomena are even now observed in the chapel. The chapel was built in 1761.

== History ==
St. Jerome chapel is the only remaining relic of the Chorão Seminary. This chapel was known as the chapel of the Celestial School. The reason for its being called celestial was due to the fact that the chapel belonged to the Chorão Seminary, where spiritual things were taught. It Is situated on a hill, is polygonal in shape and has an elegant dome. This dome rests on columns of Greek style. Besides the porch it had seats all round. The inmates of the Chorão Seminary in the evenings spent their time here enjoying rest and fresh air. The same was done by Jesuit novices.

As a homage to Jesus the Redeemer, the Vicar of the Church of Our Lady of Grace Church (Chorão Island) Fr Jose Filipe de Andrade started its repairs in the year 1900. He cleared away the vast grove of trees that blocked the view of the building, repainted the pictures of St. Jerome, which serves as a panel to the altar; there is above the altar the following inscription "TO JESUS THE REDEEMER -YEAR 1901". The chapel was re-opened for public worship on 17 August 1901. Since 1901, the feast of the Patron is annually celebrated with a mass offered in this chapel.

It had been classified by the Portuguese regime as a National Monument by a decree No. 1360 of 31 March 1932 and placed in charge of the State. The permanent Body of Archaeology on behalf of the Public Works Dept in 1903 repaired the veranda of the chapel and cleared the vast forest that surrounded the chapel.

In 1959 at the request of the then vicar of Our Lady of Grace Church (Chorão Island) Fr Tome Caetano de Nazare, the Dept of Public Works effected many improvements. The interior wall, the columns and the flooring of the circular corridor were plastered with cement. A new wooden roof was placed with Mangalore tiles. Besides in the interior of the chapel itself, the ceiling vault as well as the candle sticks and the panels on the altar were painted. The picture of St. Jerome referred to above was again retouched. The expenditure incurred amounted to Rs 7000.

== See also ==
- St Bartholomew's Church (Chorão Island)
- Capela de Nossa Senhora da Saúde
