= Our Lady of Grace Church (Chorão Island) =

Coordinates: 15.523254351230351°N 73.86894671911932°E

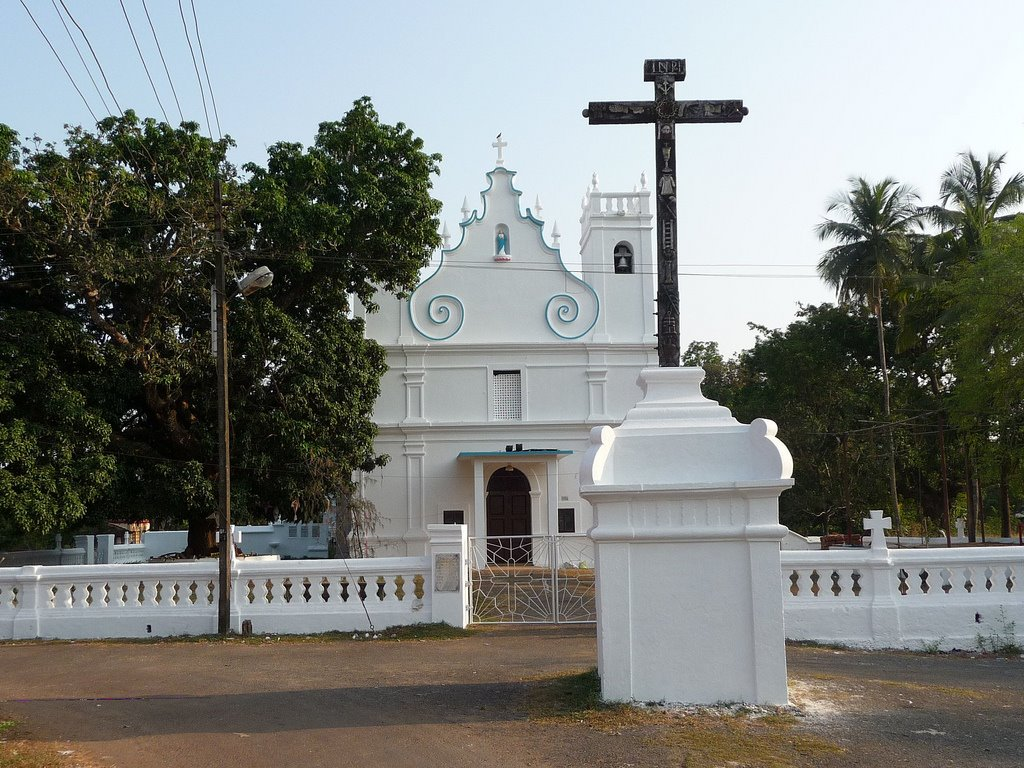
- Our Lady of Grace Church
- Location: Chorão, Goa
- Country: India
- Denomination: Roman Catholic

History
- Status: Church
- Founded: 1551
- Dedication: Our Lady of Grace

Architecture
- Style: Baroque
- Years built: 1544

Administration
- Archdiocese: Archdiocese of Goa and Daman

Our Lady of Grace Church is a Roman Catholic church in Chorão, Goa, India. It is bounded on its north and west by the Mapusa River, with Salvador do Mundo remaining exactly opposite to it. To the south is the river Mandovi with Ribandar opposite to it and to its east is the St Bartholomew's Church.

== History ==
The Our Lady of Grace Church was built by Jesuits in 1551. The church has three altars dedicated to Our Lady of Grace (Main Altar), Bom Jesus and Saint Roque. The first diocesan priest to be confirmed as Vicar of Our Lady of Grace Church was Fr. Bernard Coutinho (1598–1648), who retained this position for 50 years. He died on 14 December 1648. There is still an epitaph of the grave of Fr. Bernard Coutinho in the church.

== Feast ==
The Feast of Our Lady of Grace Church is celebrated on the third Sunday of May every year. During Portuguese times the affluence of the people of Chorão Island attracted merchants even from foreign lands who came with their merchandise luxury goods, and the Feast of Nossa Senhora da Graça was an occasion for such gathering at a grand fair.

== Seminary ==
A seminary called the Real Colégio de Educação de Chorão was established in April 1761. It belonged of the Parish of Our Lady of Grace Church.

== See also ==
- Real Colégio de Educação de Chorão
- Chapel of St. Jerome (Chorão Island)
- St Bartholomew's Church (Chorão Island)
- Capela de Nossa Senhora da Saúde (Chorão Island)
- Chorão
- Salim Ali Bird Sanctuary
