= St Bartholomew's Church (Chorão Island) =

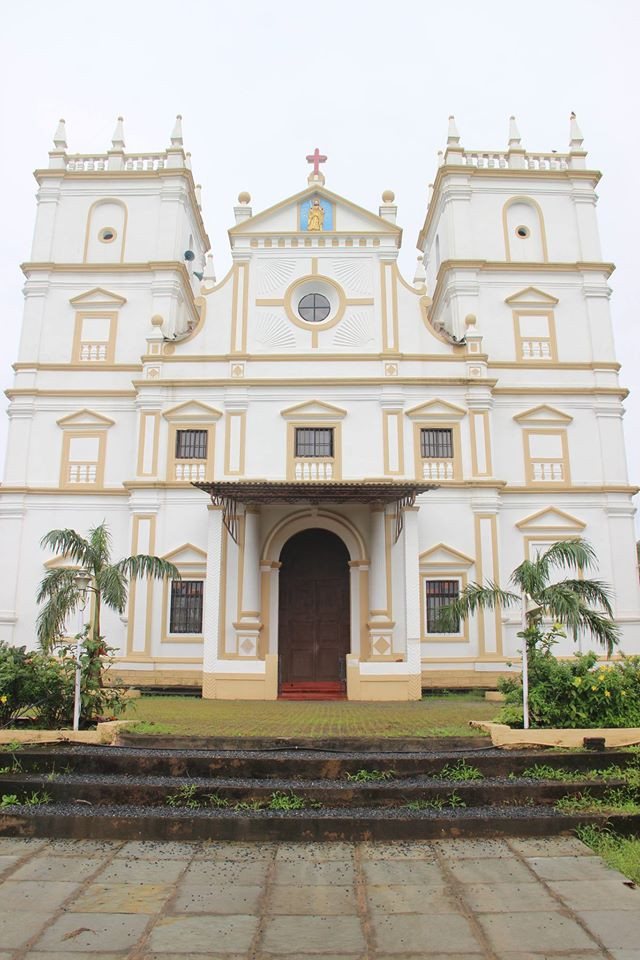
- St Bartholomew's Church, Chorão
- St Bartholomew's Church
- 15.548°N 73.879°E
- Location: Chorão, Goa
- Country: India
- Denomination: Roman Catholic

History
- Status: Church
- Founded: 1569
- Dedication: Saint Bartholomew

Architecture
- Style: Baroque

Administration
- Archdiocese: Archdiocese of Goa and Daman

St Bartholomew's Church is a Roman Catholic church in Chorão, Goa, India. The Parish of St. Bartholomeu is made up of the villages of Caraim and the Passo de Ambarim. Its boundaries are the river of Mapusa to its north and west; on the opposite side of the river the parishes of Aldona and Pomburpa; the parish of Our Lady of Grace Church to the south and the river Naroa with the Parish of Pedade on the Island of Divar to its east.

== History ==
The Church of St. Bartholomeu was built in the year 1569 by the religious of the Society of Jesus and handed over to the diocesan clergy in 1597.

== See also ==
- Our Lady of Grace Church (Chorão Island)
- Chapel of St. Jerome (Chorão Island)
- Capela de Nossa Senhora da Saúde (Chorão Island)
- Real Colégio de Educação de Chorão
- Chorão
