= Real Colégio de Educação de Chorão =

Defunct Catholic seminary in Portuguese Goa

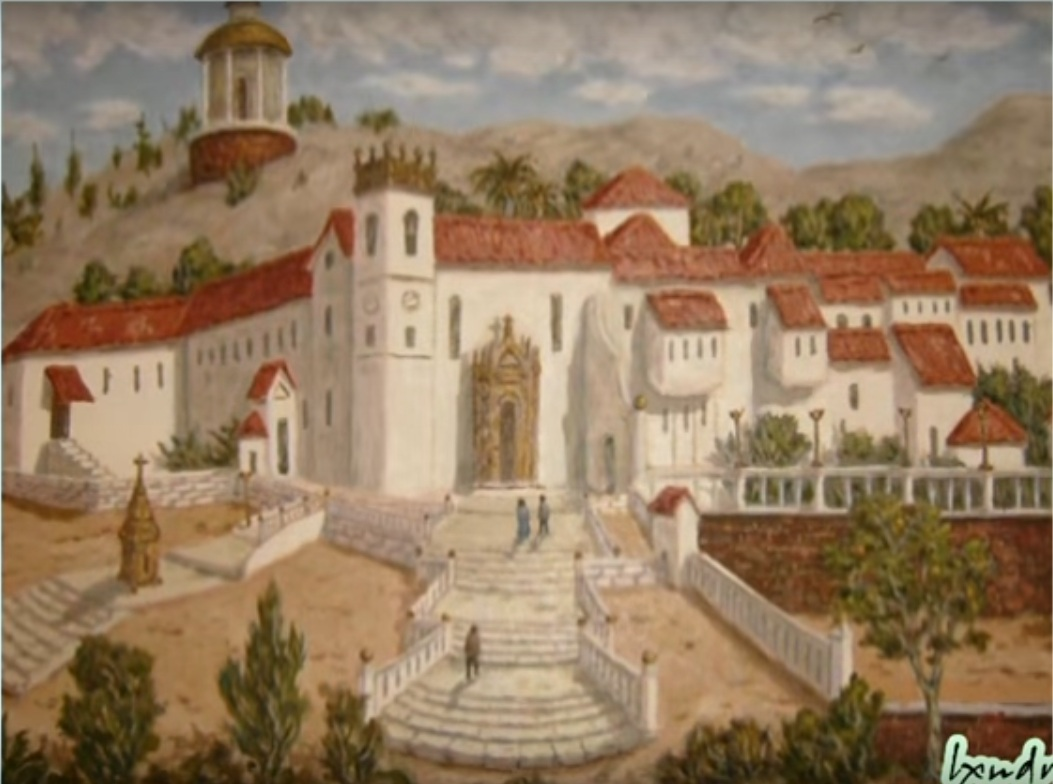
- Façade of the seminary
- Type: Seminary
- Active: 1761–1859
- Affiliations: Roman Catholic
- Location: Chorão, Goa, Portuguese India; 15.527°N 73.878°E

Real Colégio de Educação de Chorão is a defunct Catholic seminary that was founded on 2 April 1761 in Chorão, Portuguese Goa. It belonged to the parish of Our Lady of Grace Church.

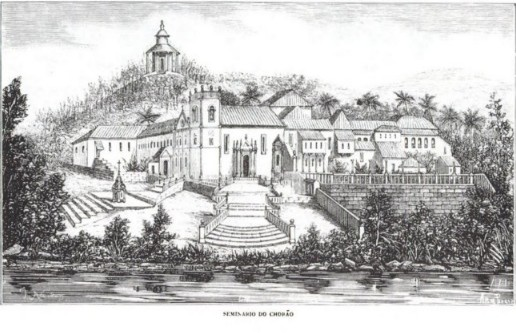
Seminário do Chorão

== History ==
The Real Colégio de Educação de Chorão was instituted in the edifice for Jesuit novices. This college was declared Seminary by the Royal Instructions to the Viceroy Conde de Ega dated 2 April 1761 written by the Secretary of State, Francisco Xavier de Mendonça Furtado.

A large number of students attended the Seminary chiefly from Ilhas and Bardes and of these 19 were educated free by the state and were destined to work in the service of the Missions. In addition to the teaching staff and students, the seminary had a medical practitioner, one porter, one sacristan and one infirmarian

The following subjects were taught in this college : Latin, Rational and Moral Philosophy, Dogmatic and Moral Theology(3 years), Gregorian chant and liturgy. Archbishop S Galdinho added the study of Portuguese Grammar and elements of Rhetoric, Geometry, Physics. Archbishop Silva Torres added yet more namely study of universal History, including the one of Portugal and its territories, geography, ecclesiastical history, Canon Law and Sacred Scriptures.

The posts of Rector and Vice Rector were entrusted provisionally to the Portuguese Dominicans. They were to hold these post until the arrival of the fathers of the Congregation of the Missions hailing from Convento de Rilhafoles, popularly known as Vincentians or Lazarists who in fact landed in Goa during the monsoons of the year 1779.

Even though the Dominicans were conducting the affairs of the Chorão Seminary, its superior direction of studies and magisterium by express Royal order was at the time placed into the hands of the Congregation of St. Philip Neri of Goa. The Superior was called "Perfect of Studies"

The Lazarists to whom the Chorão Seminary was handed over in view of the obedience to Royal mandates of 21 March 1779 had to retire from Goa by a decree issued on 13 December 1779. This withdrawal was done successively in the years 1786,1787 and 1791 and ultimately in 1793 because of a misunderstanding between them and the local Government. Two of these religious went to Macao and the rest to Portugal.

Once again the Chorão Seminary was handed over to the Oratorians who carried on up to the suppression of Religious Orders in Goa in 1834 and from hence the Chorão Seminary was in charge of Diocesan indigenous clergy.

By a resolution dated 14 April 1781, the Junta da Real Fazenda allotted to the Chorão Seminary a yearly contribution of 9038159 paradaus for all the expenses; the surplus was to be utilized towards extraordinary repairs. Accounts had also to be submitted. In 1855, the state further contributed an annual subsidy of 6316100 Xerafins.

== Churches and Chapels ==
=== Nossa Senhora da Assunção ===
The Church of Nossa Senhora da Assunção was situated to the west of the Seminary facing the South. Though it was small in dimension, yet it had beautifully ornamented and gilded pictures on the vault. The Church was dedicated to the Glorious Assumption of Our Lady. There were 3 altars. The main altar was dedicated to Nossa Senhora da Assunção, the side altars to St. Aloysius Gonzaga and Nossa Senhora da Boa Morte. The three feasts were solemnly celebrated with great splendour respectively on the 14th, 15th and 16 August.

The facade of the Church had one large door and a window on either side and corresponding to this the upper section contained three more windows above the door and lower windows. In front of the church was the Churchyard(adro) with steps leading to the level of the street where there was a big stone cross(cruzeiro). The tower of the church between the facade and the seminary was very prominent and had a large clock with pointers or hands; and the hours were struck by huge bells which could be heard by people residing even in the neighbouring villages.

=== Chapels ===
In the body of the seminary there were two chapels, the Chapel of Santo Christo and the other of Nossa Senhora da Patrocinio. Within the walls there was the Chapel of St. Jerome, this chapel is the only remaining relic of the Seminary of Chorão.

The Chapel of Nossa Senhora da Patrocinio was the richest and well worked out. It was in this chapel that the Seminarians performed their spiritual exercises. The chapel had also a box containing the relics of the Blesses Martyrs of Cuncolim.

==== St. Jerome Chapel ====
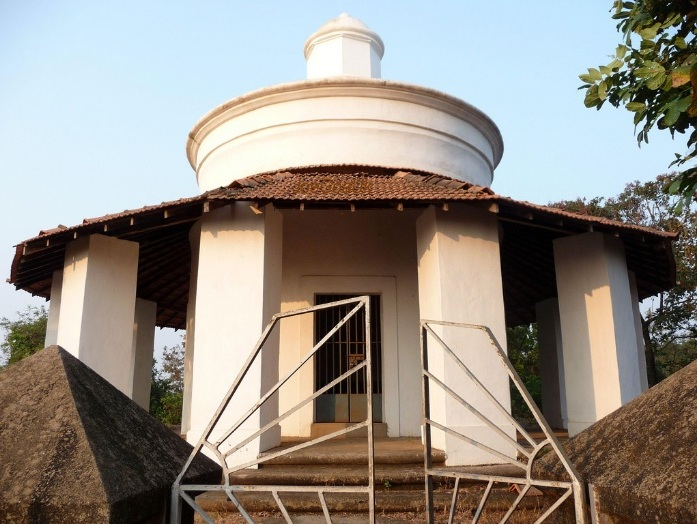
St. Jerome Chapel only remaining relic of the Seminary of Chorão

== Closing ==
In consequence of the insalubrious atmosphere prevailing at that time on Chorão Island as well as of the lamentable condition of the magnificent edifice, which was almost tottering to ruins, the seminary was provisionally closed by a decree No.52 of 28 May 1859, and the Rector, Professors and Seminarians shifted to the Rachol Seminary. Fr. António Filipe Lourenço, from Margão was the last Rector.

When the Chorão Seminary was closed a few images, panels and movable objects were sold in 1871 by the Junta da Fazenda. Some Image of Our Lady of Boa Morte, the organ and books which belonged to the period commencing from 1837 were dispatched to the Seminary of Rachol. Some of the Books previous to the year 1837 are preserved in the Historical Archives. The Relics Box of the Blessed Martyrs of Cuncolim were shifted to Cathedral Church of Goa where the box is kept on the altar of St. Anne.

The image of our lord (Senhor Morto) is now venerated in the Monastery of Pilar. The panels and columns of the chapel of Santo Christo are in the Church of Sirigao. The statue of St Jerome is venerated on the left collateral altar of the Mapuca Church. Part of the panel from the chapel alto relevo of the Assumption and the panel from the chapel of Nossa Senhora da Patrocinio is in the Church of Saligao. The Exposition Throne, the pulpit and the sepulchre are in the Church of Salvador do Mundo.

== See also ==
- Our Lady of Grace Church (Chorão Island)
- Chapel of St. Jerome (Chorão Island)
- St Bartholomew's Church (Chorão Island)
- Capela de Nossa Senhora da Saúde (Chorão Island)
- Chorão
- Rachol Seminary
