= Salim Ali Bird Sanctuary =

Mangrove habitat and bird sanctuary in Goa, India

- Dr. Salim Ali Bird Sanctuary
- IUCN category IV (habitat/species management area)
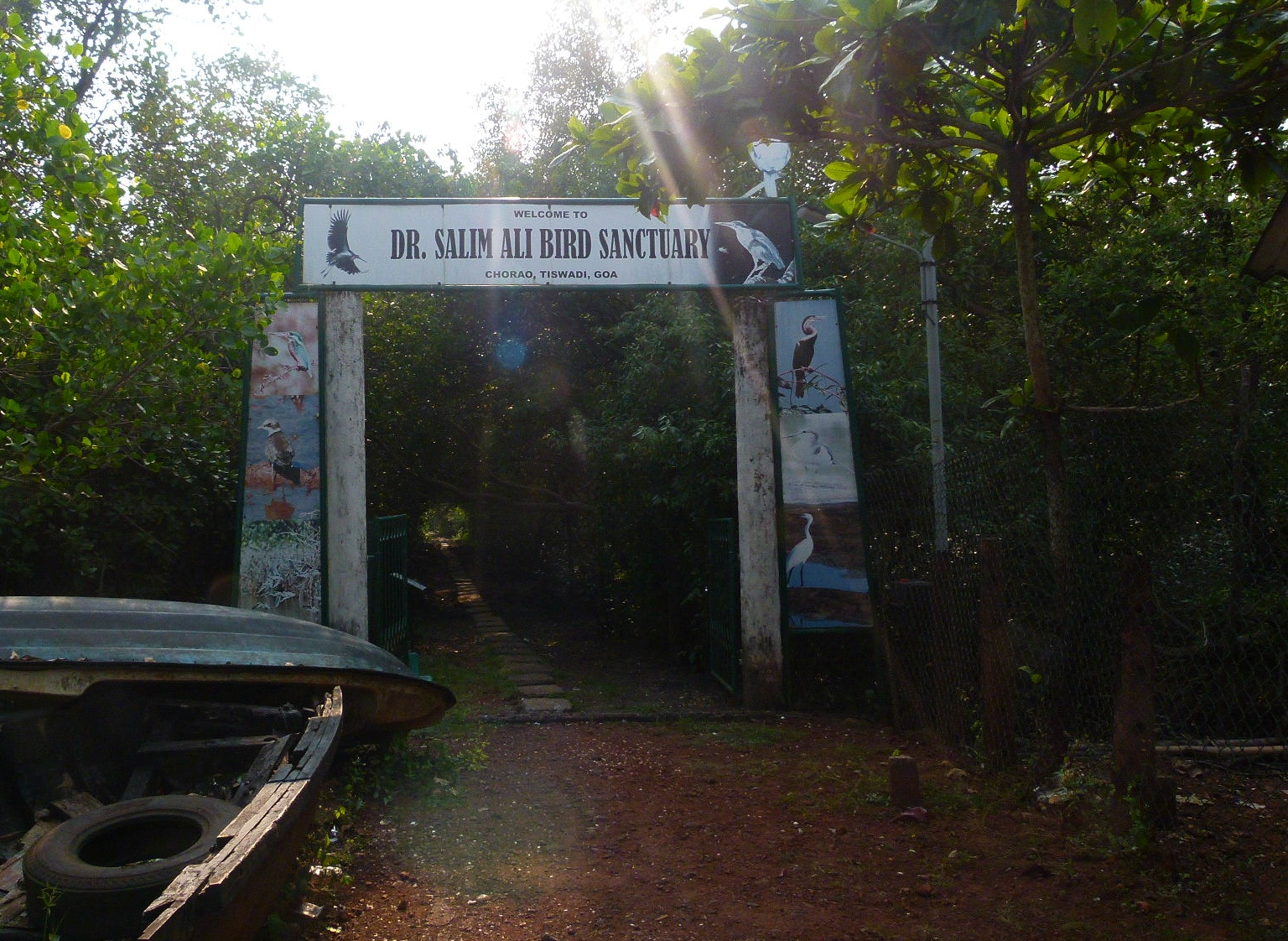
- Entrance of the sanctuary

- Location within Goa Location within India
- Interactive map of Salim Ali Bird Sanctuary
- Location: Chorão, Goa, India
- Nearest city: Panaji
- Coordinates: 15°30′53″N 73°51′27″E
- Area: 178 ha (440 acres)
- Established: 1988

Salim Ali Bird Sanctuary is an estuarine mangrove habitat, which is declared as the bird sanctuary, and located on western tip of the Island of Chorão along the Mandovi River, Goa, in India. The sanctuary is named after Salim Ali, the eminent Indian ornithologist.

The sanctuary and island are accessed by a ferry service running between Ribander and Chorão. The sanctuary has a paved walk that runs between mangroves of Rhizophora mucronata, Avicennia officinalis and other species.

== Description ==
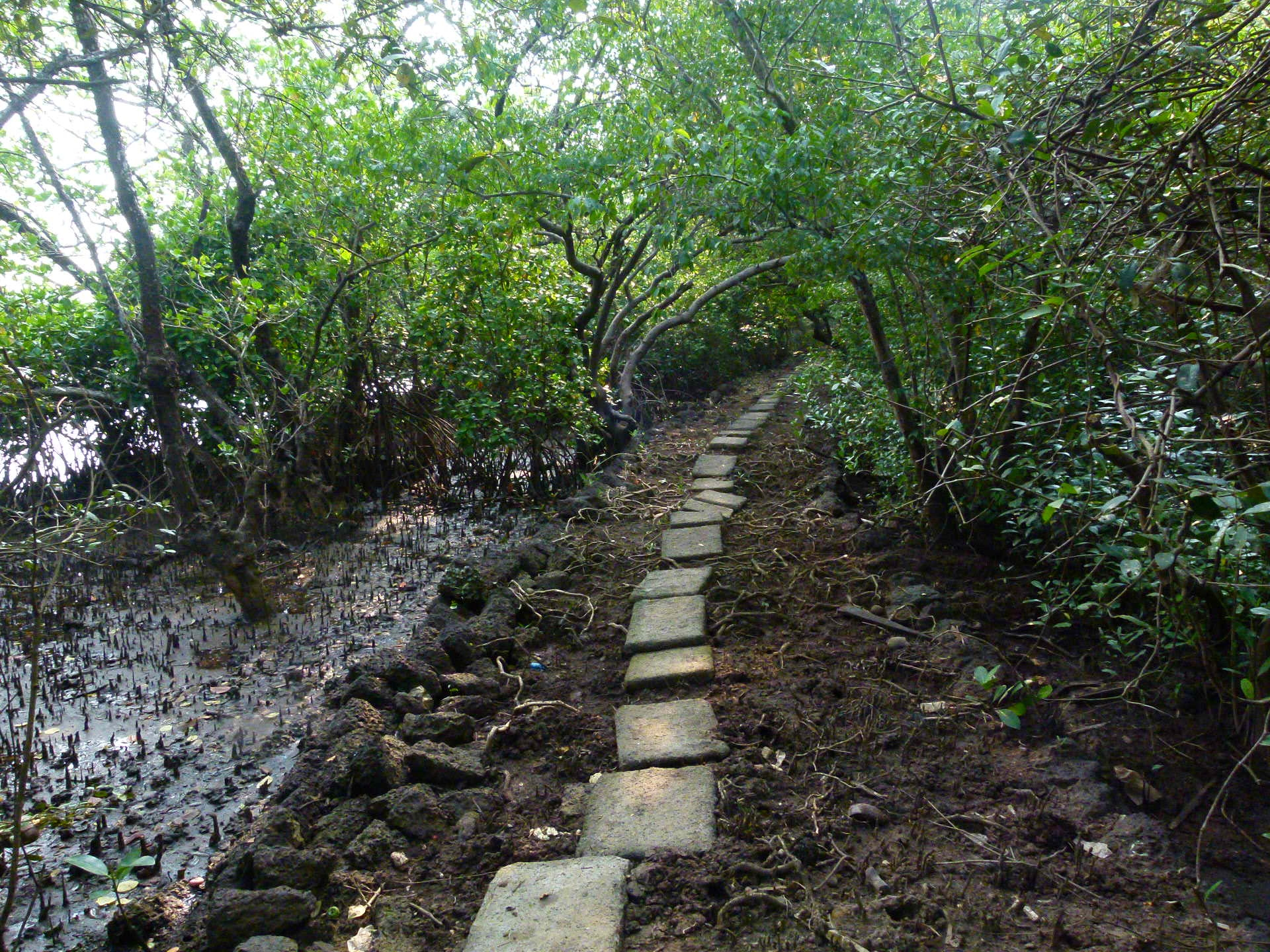
Paved walkway inside the sanctuary

The size of the sanctuary is 178 ha (440 acres). The area is covered by low mangrove forest.

== Flora and fauna ==
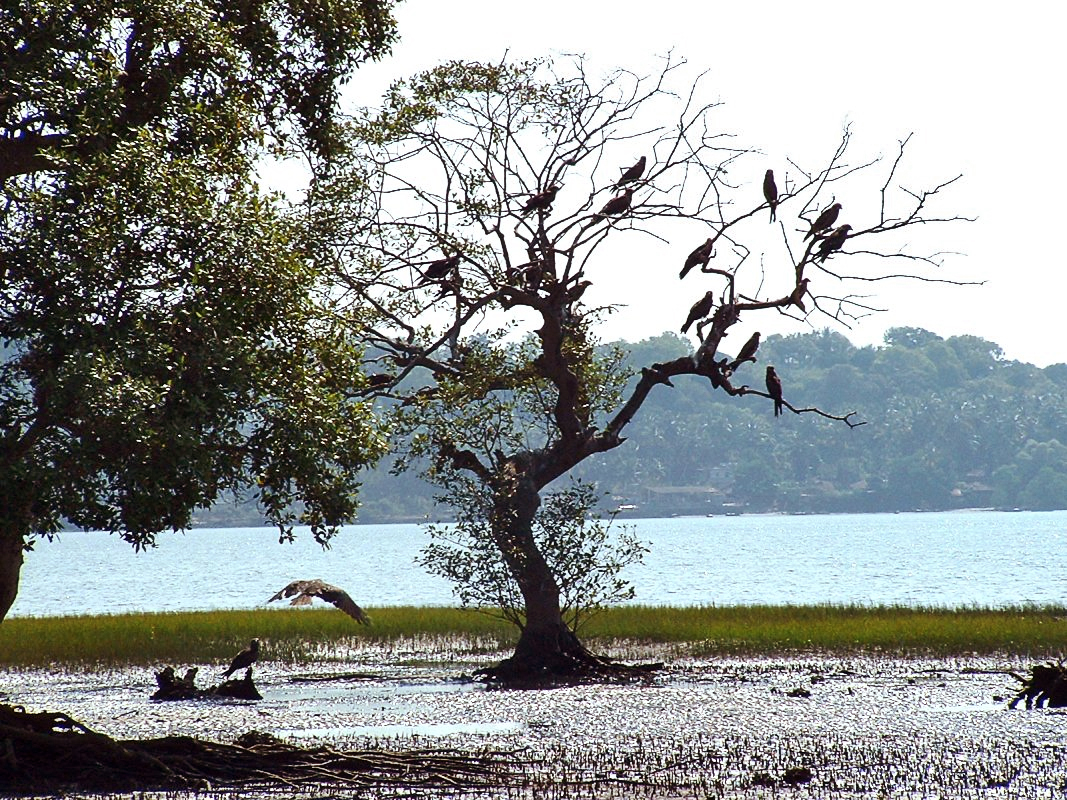
Salim Ali Bird sanctuary is one of the best-known bird sanctuaries in India.

Several species of birds have been recorded and the common species include the striated heron and western reef heron. Other species that have been recorded include the little bittern, black bittern, red knot, jack snipe and pied avocet (on transient sandbanks). The sanctuary is also host to mudskippers, fiddler crabs and other mangrove habitat specialists. A species of crustacean Teleotanais indianis was described based on specimens obtained in the sanctuary.

== Media ==
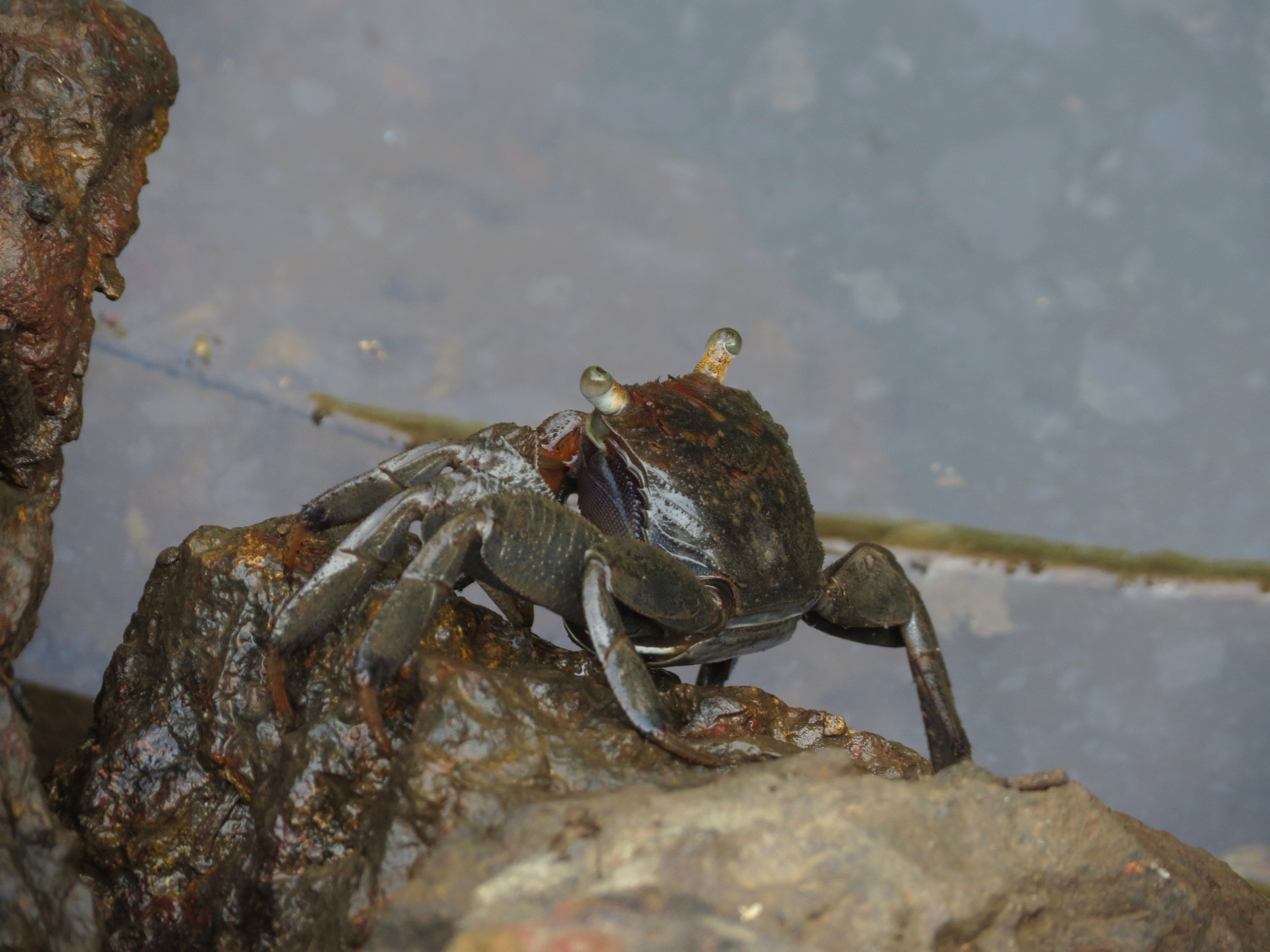
un-id'ed Crab

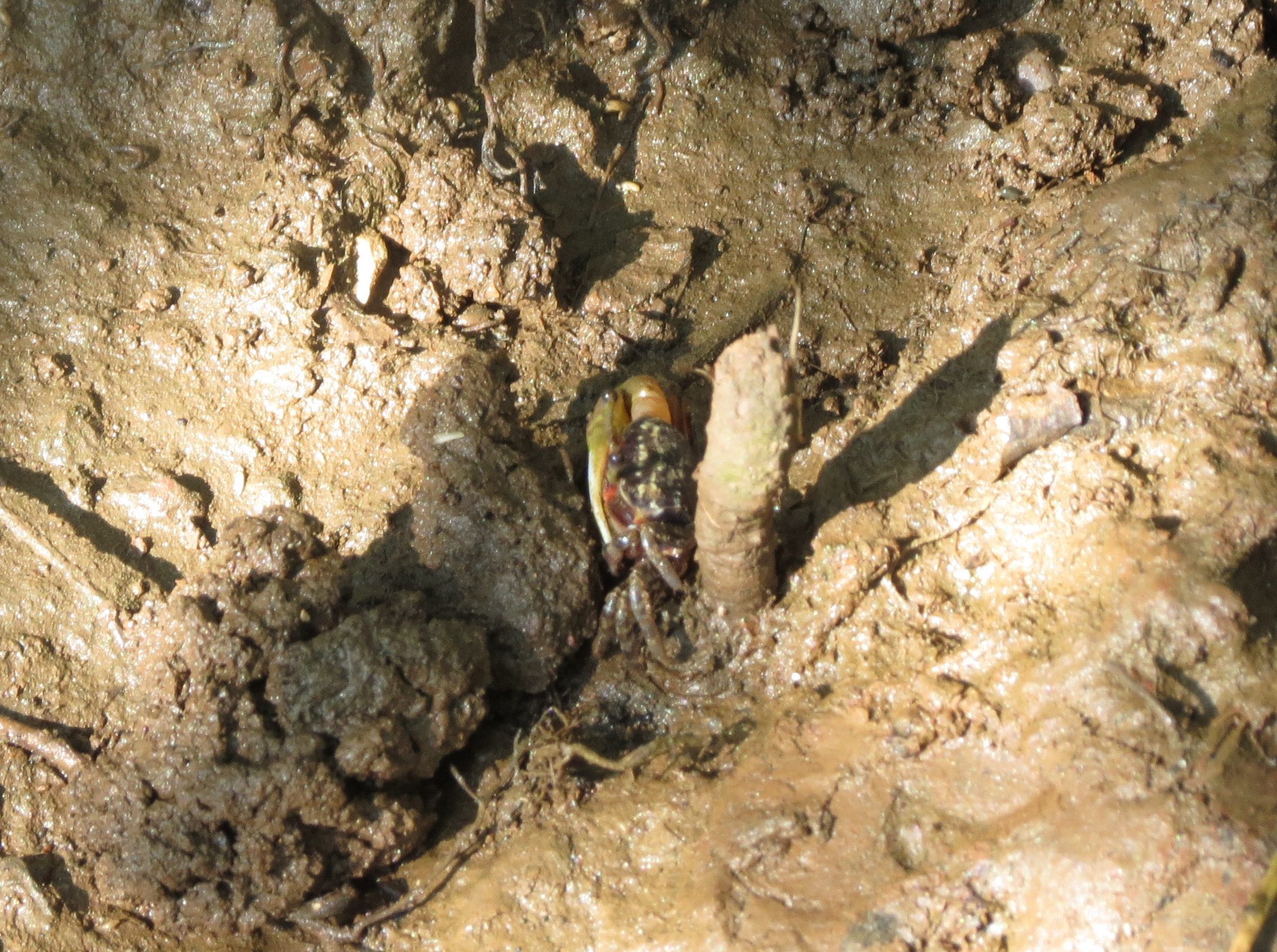
Porcelain fiddler

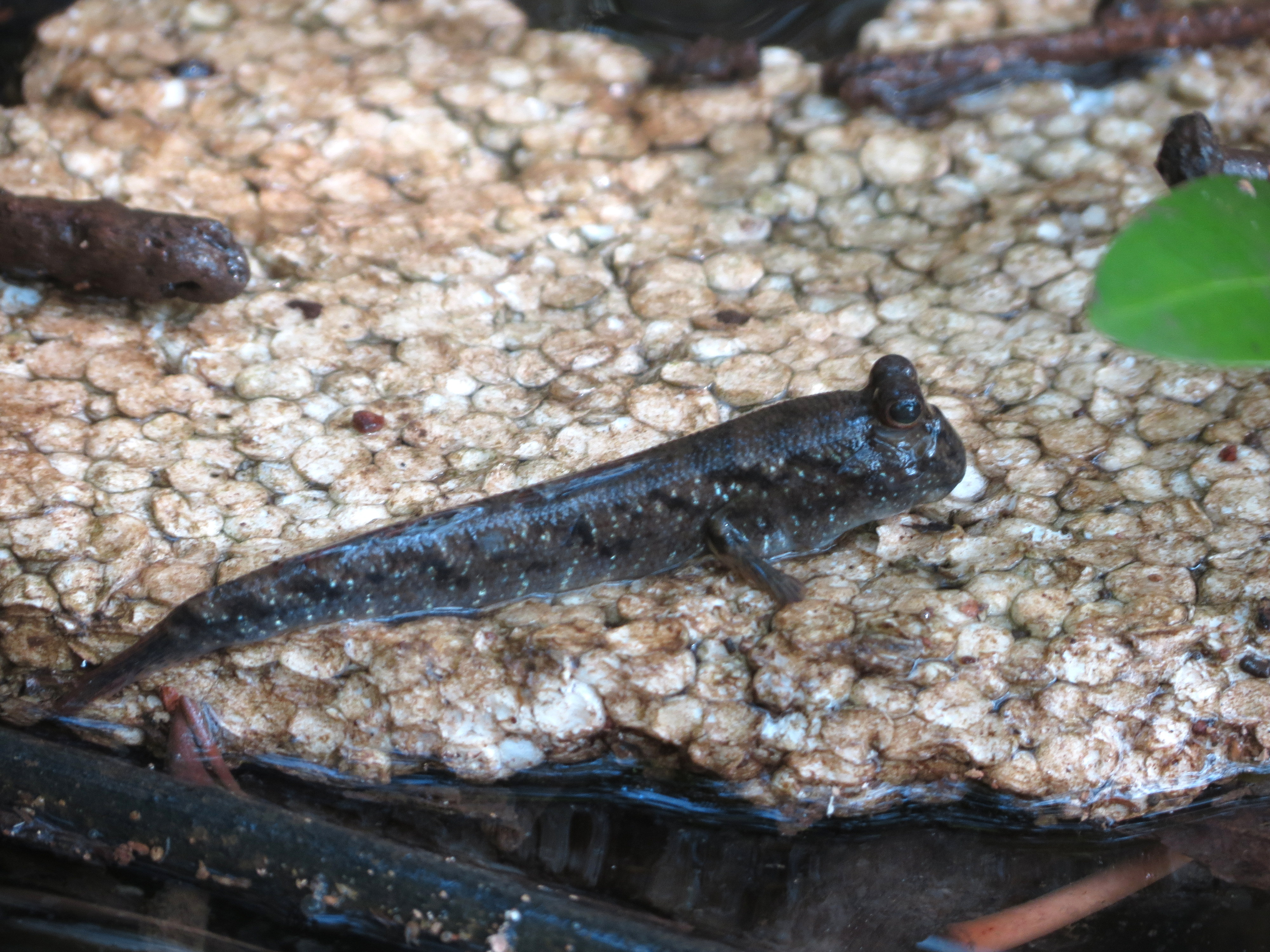
Mudskipper

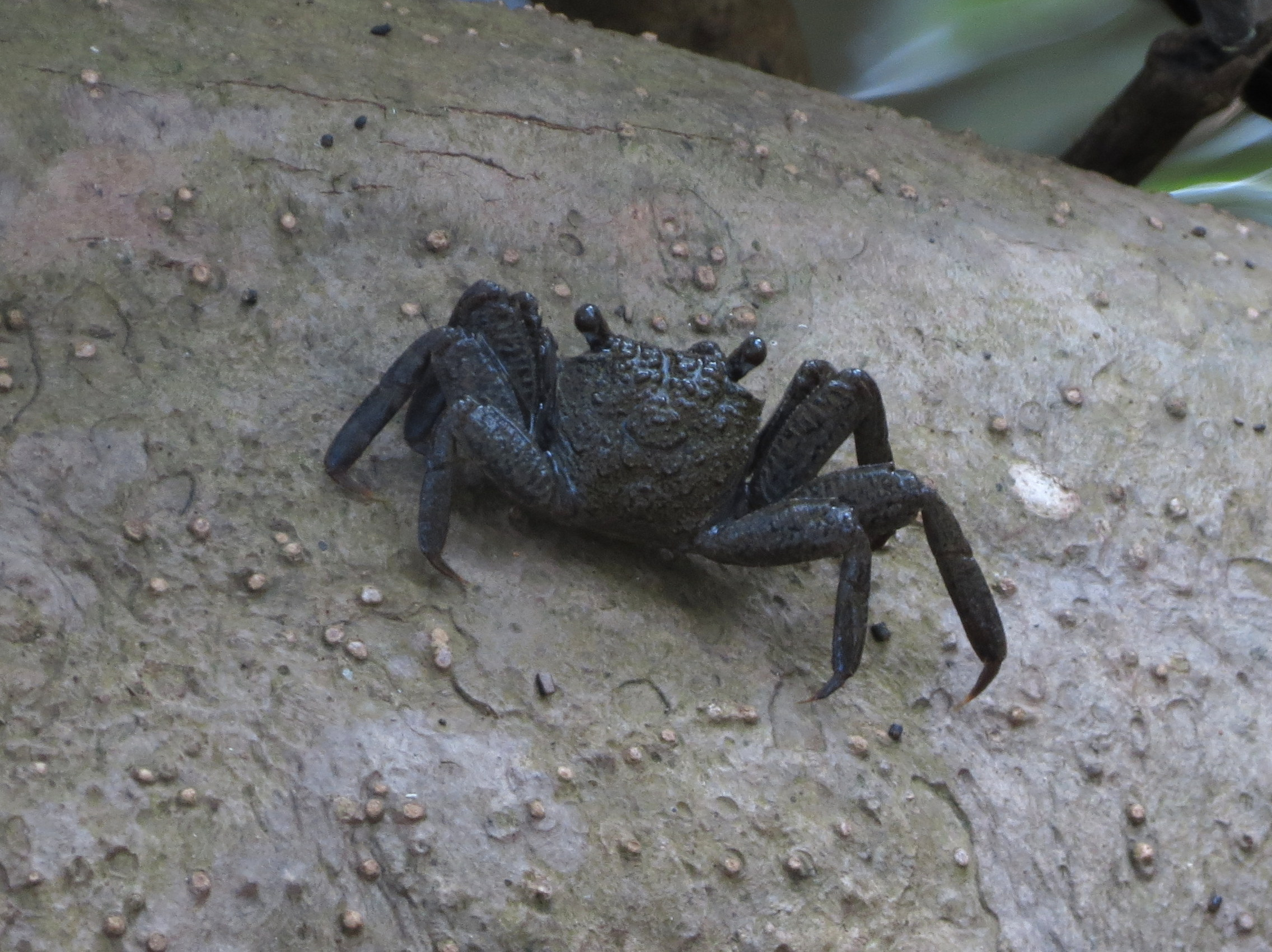
un-id'ed Crab

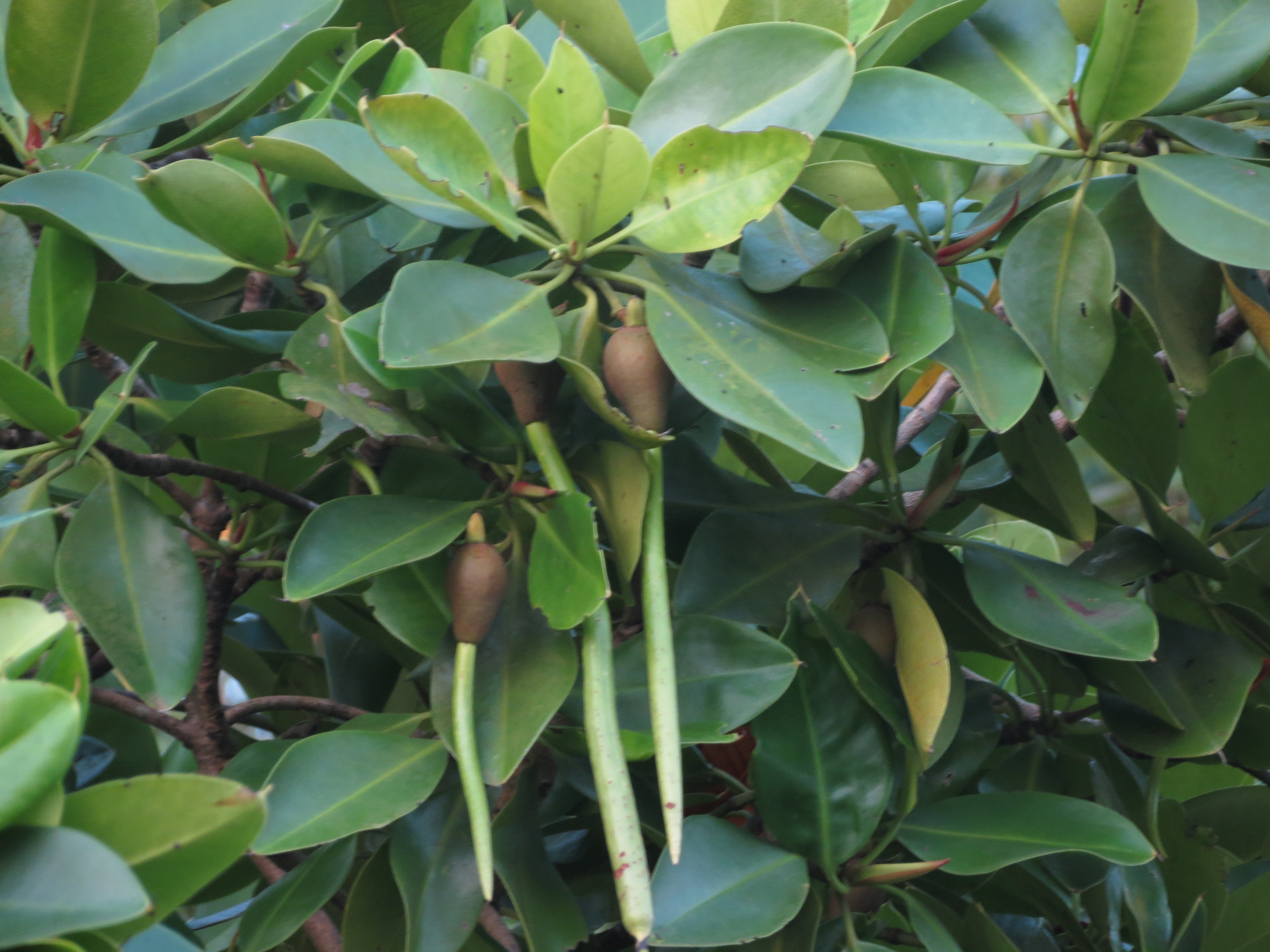
Rhizophora mucronata fruit

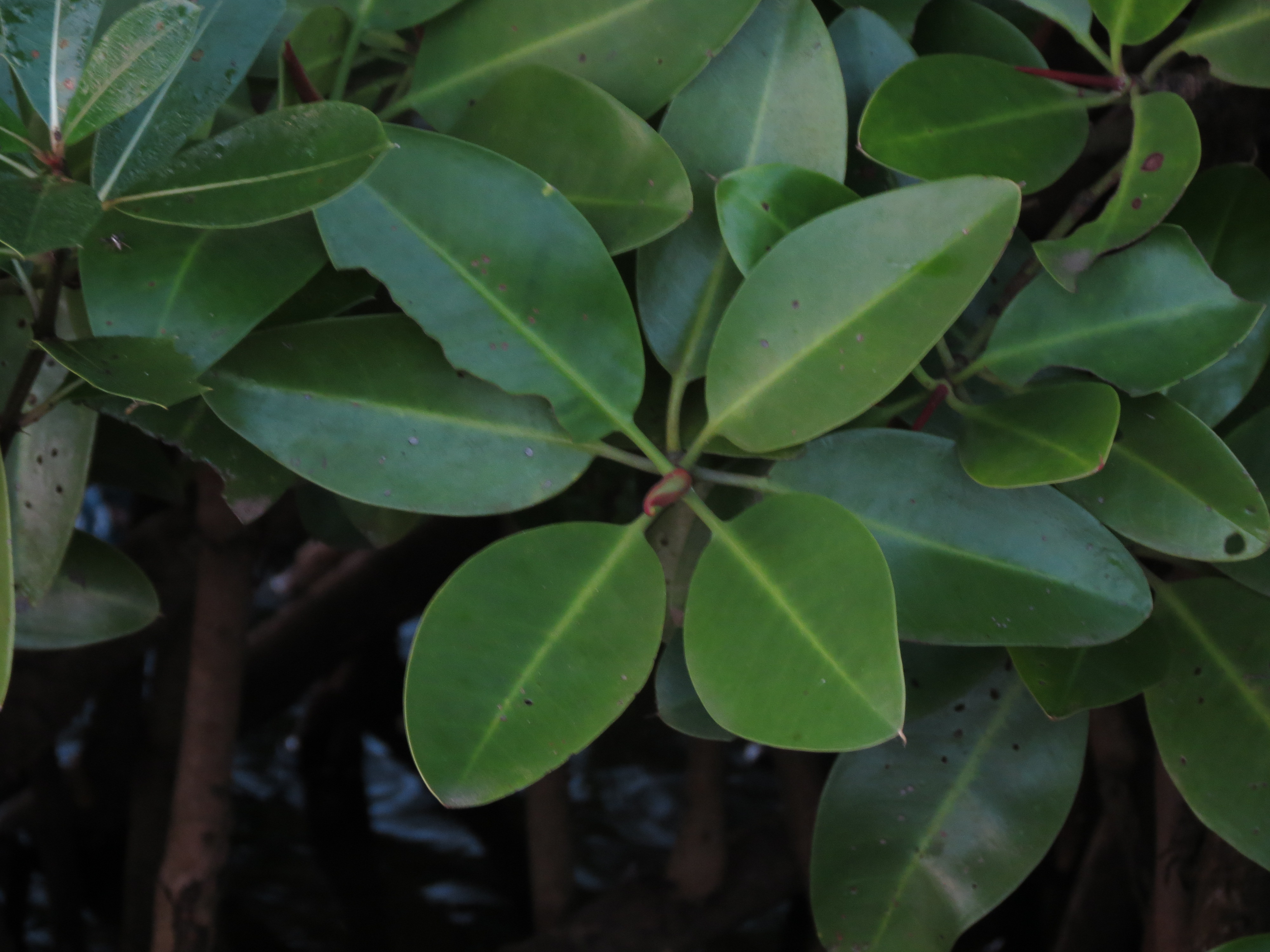
Rhizophora mucronata leaves

== See also ==
- Salim Ali
- Bird sanctuaries of India
