= Chorão (island) =

Chorão Ilha dos Fidalgos
- Island
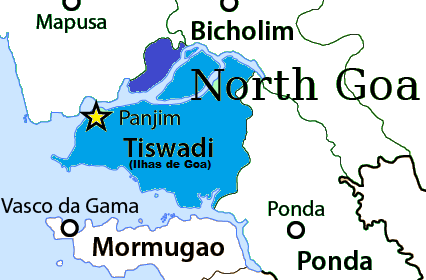
- Location of Chorão (dark blue) in Ilhas de Goa (light blue)

- Location within Goa Location within India
- Coordinates: 15°32′50.7″N 73°52′45.8″E
- Country: India
- State: Goa
- District: North Goa
- Sub District: Tiswadi
- Named for: Chudamani (Sanskrit for Precious stones) Ilha dos Fidalgos (Portuguese for Island of Noblemen)

Government
  - Type: Communidade, Panchayat
- Elevation: 8 m (26 ft)

Population
  - Total: 5,345
- Demonym: Chodnekar or Chorãocar

Languages
  - Official: Konkani
  - Also Spoken: Portuguese, English
  - Historical: Portuguese
- Time zone: UTC+5:30 (IST)
- Postcode: 403102
- Telephone Code: 0832

Chorão (formerly known as Choddnnem) is an island along the Mandovi River near Tiswadi, Goa, India. It is the largest among other 17 islands of Goa. It is located 5 kilometres (3.1 miles) away from the state capital, the city of Panaji and 10 kilometres (6.2 miles) away from the city of Mapusa.

Chorão is accessible by the ferry from Ribandar. Chorão village is known for its Luso-Goan churches and houses. It is also known for its bird sanctuary. It is one of six major islands between the Mandovi and Zuari, the others being:

- Ilha de Goa;
- Divar;
- Cumbarjua;
- St Estevam;
- Vanxim; and
- Several other small mangrove islands and sand banks.

== Etymology ==
Etymologically, the island's name "Choddnnem" is derived from the Sanskrit word chuddamonnim. Chudda means headwear and Monnim (Mani) signifies some thing worn in the shape of a necklace or a jewel of cylindrical shape. The Portuguese noblemen found the island a pleasurable place to live and hence the name Ilha dos Fidalgos (Island of Noblemen).

== History ==
=== Pre-Portuguese history of Chorão ===
'The First Wave' of Indo-Aryan migration to Goa happened between the Christian era 4th–3rd century BC to 3rd–4th century AD. Descendants of these settlers eventually formed 96 Brahmin clans. Ninety-six in Konkani is Shennai, from which comes the surname Shenoy or Shenvi (spelled Sinai in Portuguese). Of the ninety-six Sinai clans, ten families settled in Chorão. The Shenvi Brahmins would henceforth go on to dominate the socio-economic and religious sphere of Goan life.

According to Goan historian José Gerson da Cunha, Chorão was a site of an ancient Tirtha (sacred pool) and was known as Mahakshetra (Great country or place). The Shenvi Brahmins were much respected, handsome, well-behaved and skillful. Jesuit missionary and writer Luís Fróis described the residents of Chorão as follows, "These Brahmins are very polite and of keen intelligence. They are fine gentlemen, fair and well proportioned. Possessing many qualities which are not possible to enumerate. The wives of these Brahmins are a reserved type of people, steady in their habits. They are honest, naturally modest in their disposition and are devoted to their husbands whom they serve well. They do not remarry on the death of their husbands and do not use coloured dresses and since the imposition of the law forbidding sati or widow burning they shave their heads even though they may be young. Their sons are very able men, fair, gentle in their demeanour and of good common sense". (The tonsuring of widows was also later abolished by the Portuguese like Sati system.)

Chorão's Brahmins were served by temple attendants called Kalavants (the community is now known as Gomantak Maratha Samaj in Goa). According to P. D. Xavier, "the Kalavant system might have originated from the widows who ran away and took shelter in the village temples to escape sati, the inhuman practice of burning the widow on her husband"s pyre."

=== Christianization of Chorão ===
The island was Christianised by the Jesuits as they did the adjoining islands of Divar and Salcete. In 1510, this area was one of the first to be conquered by the Portuguese and by 1552, the island of Chorão had a population of just above 3,000, 300 of whom were Christian and by this time, a small church was built. By the end of 1559, over 1,200 had accepted baptism in total. The following year, in 1560, the first bishop from the Jesuit order, Dom João Nunes de Barreto set up residence in Chorão, which eventually became a Noviciate.

Jesuit missionary and writer Luís Fróis in his letter dated 10 December 1560 says "Most of these Brahmins can speak Portuguese and are happy to learn the doctrine pertaining to Faith and Morals". With incredible brevity the whole of the Island of Chorão prepared itself for the general baptism which was fixed for 8 August 1560. The archbishop along with some priests visited Chorão Island first, followed by Father Melchior Carneiro and the provincial. It being the month of August, a time when it rains heavily, the repairs of the church were hurriedly completed. The Viceroy Dom Constantino of Braganza came with retinue and brought his musicians who played on a variety of instruments like trumpets, drums and charamelas. Viceroy Dom Constantino of Braganza also stood as god-father (sponsor) to the important men of the place treating them with love and affection. This alone was more than sufficient to keep the neophytes happy. As many as possible were baptised that evening. Father Joseph Ribeiro stayed behind and baptized the remaining. In all, therefore the number of the converts reached 1207, the greater part of the people of the Island having already been baptized before.

Fróis says that a greater number of those who embraced Christianity in Chorão were Chaudarins (Toddy-Tappers). They also made better Christians and being more homely, were easy to be converted. They made their confession during Lent, some confessed their sins fortnightly, others monthly and six or seven of them every Sunday and they received Communion in the Church of Our Lady of Grace Church (Chorão Island).

Some Chorão women, on the occasion of their baptism, wore some much gold to the extent of astonishing the missionaries. They belong to the caste of Chardo. In 1566 Chorão had 2470 converts and few Brahmins had promised to become Roman Catholics later. In 1582 there were three thousand converts in Chorão and all its inhabitants were Roman Catholics and many came from outside to receive baptism.

=== Ilha dos Fidalgos ===
A large number of buildings with storeys stand, surrounded by flower gardens attached to one another. Typically the place of comfort and luxury, this was where most of the nobility resided. This is the reason why Chorão Island is known as "Ilha dos Fidalgos" (Island of Noblemen).

Tradition has it that when these Fidalgos went for Mass, a special place was set apart to protect their superfine umbrellas, chiefly made of red damask. The fidalgos would be found often lounging near the ferry point on the south-eastern side of the island, waiting for patmarios (sail boats) to cross over to Old Goa or Ribandar. The Fidalgos as well as the common folk took great delight in chewing on snacks available then and gulped down hot tea in the shacks. They enjoyed the freshly steamed merem (snack) and sipped the hot cha (tea) at that spot.

=== Cheese of Chorão ===
Chorão was once famous for its European-style ripened cheese, produced from dairy cattle since the 16th century, and known as Queijo da Ilha de Chorão (Cheese from the island of Chorão). Chorão Cheese was popular with both the Goan natives and the Portuguese gentry in Goa. Chorão Cheese also used to be exported even as far as Macau. Due to the emigration of cheesemakers from the island, the cheese industry became extinct in the 19th century.

=== Forts of Chorão ===
Two well equipped fortresses guarded Chorão Island from the incursion of Marathas. The Fortaleza de São Bartolomeu de Chorão (Fort São Bartolomeu) was built in 1720 in the north eastern part of Chorão Island. It had a castle within its enclosures. Among other features, it had eleven cannons and was used for the defense of the fort that surrounded Chorão island and those of Calvim. According to José Nicolau da Fonseca, it was probably erected at the same time as the Fort of Naroa. The fort was abandoned in 1811 and now lies in total ruins.

=== Education institutions ===
In 1559, the Jesuits founded a school in Chorão for the children of the village. It is recorded that the number of them at one time reached 400. Reading, writing and Christian doctrine were taught in this school. According to the belief of the people the school was functioning in a building situated at the western part of the hill built as a residence of the Jesuits by Fr. Dom João Nunes Baretto S.J. Patriarch of Ethiopia. The Konkani language which was a great help for the conversion work was probably taught in this school. It was meant for the Jesuits.

==== Seminary of Chorão ====
Main Article : Real Colégio de Educação de Chorão

==== Latin School ====
According to a decree issued on 19 April 1871 after a resolution had been passed by the Communidade of Chorão on 6 February 1870, it was decided to establish on the Island of Chorão at the expense of the Communidade of Chorão a School of Latin, the payment of the Professor who was to be appointed by the Government of the State.

==== English School ====
In 1944 Fr. Elias Gama wanted to build a new English school on Chorão Island, he could not do it as there was one founded by Mr. Januario Pereira of Boctavaddo, St Barthomews High School, though it was not actually running. It was the merit of Fr. Elias Gama to restart it. On 6 November 1952 a new building of a school was inaugurated by Dom José da Costa Nunes. The medium is English and the school prepares for the S.S.C examination.

== Villages ==
The Chorão island constituted of three comunidades namely:

Saude is the centre of the island.

=== Chorão ===
This village is located on the south of the island.

==== Village Church ====
Igreja de Nossa Senhora de Graça Our Lady of Grace Church (Chorão Island) St Bartholomew's Church(Chorão Island)

=== Ambelim ===
This village is located on the north west of the island.

==== Village Church ====
Igreja de São Bartolomeu, Chorão St Bartholomew's Church (Chorão Island)

=== Caraim (Caroi) ===
This village is located on the north east of the island.

==== Village Church ====
Capela de Nossa Senhora da Saúde (Chorão Island)

== Bird Sanctuary ==
The Chorão Island is considered attractive primarily due to its flora and fauna. Containing numerous mangroves – the forests grow in the water.

Chorão is also home to the Salim Ali Bird Sanctuary, in the western part of the island, on an area of 178 hectares. It is the largest bird sanctuary of Goa is located. The reserve has got its name from the famous Indian ornithologist Dr. Salim Ali and now it proudly bears the name of "Salim Ali Bird Sanctuary". The territory of this National Park is inhabited by migratory and local birds of over 400 species. The crocodiles can also be seen among the aquatic inhabitants of Salim Ali Bird Sanctuary.

== People of Chorão Island ==
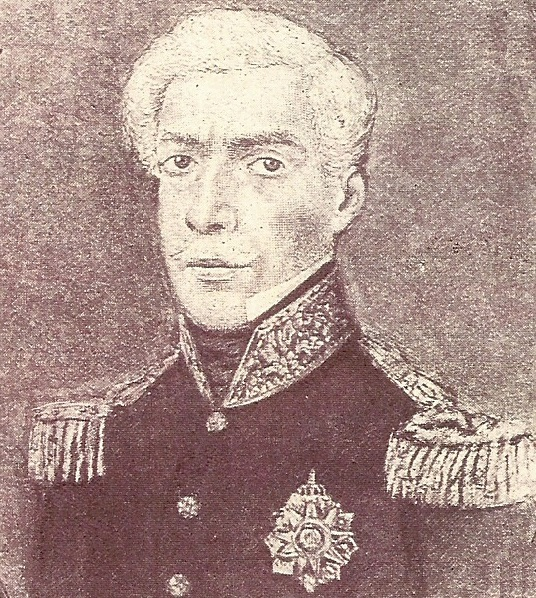
Braz Fernandes

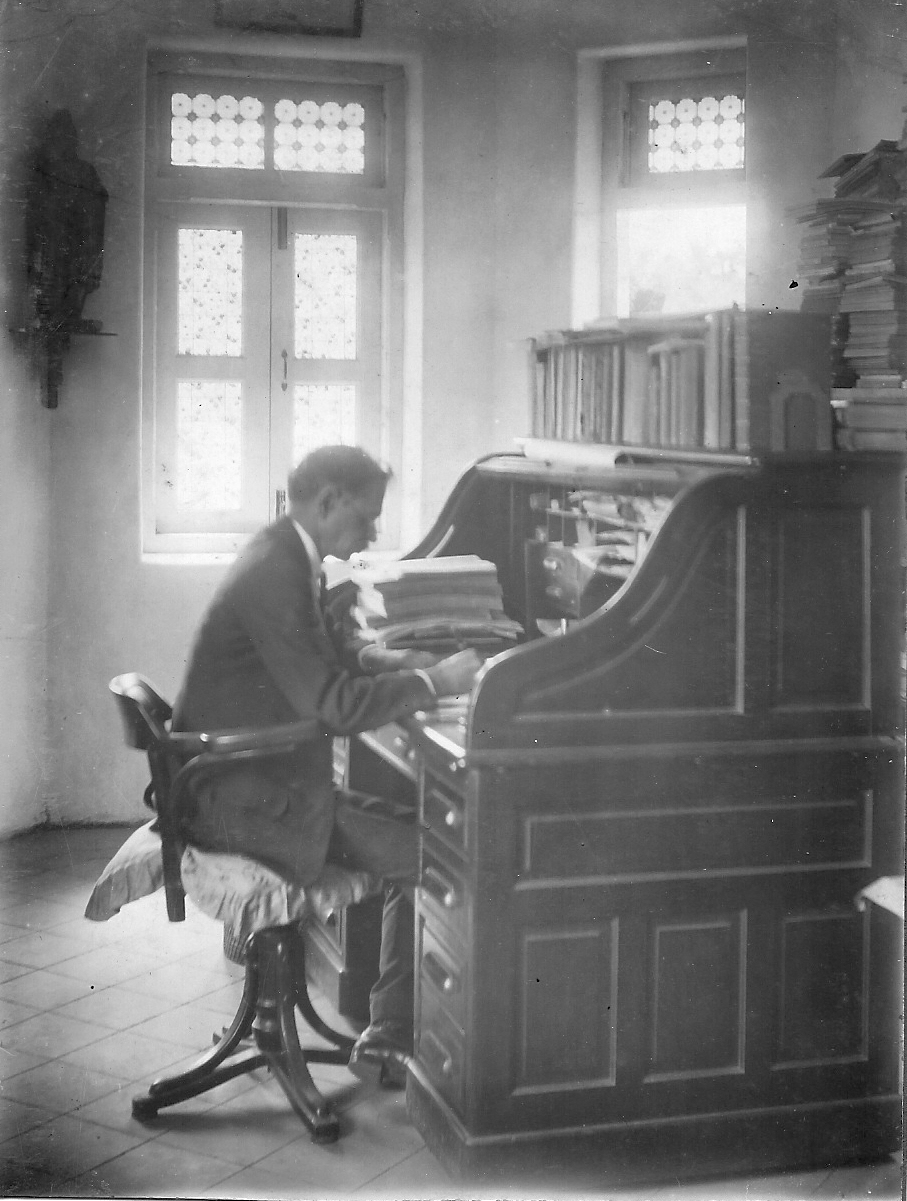
Braz Anthony Fernandes

Name	Occupation
Locu Sinai Naique(Lucas de Sa)	Rendeiro Mor(Chief tax collector) & Village Judicial Authority-1548,"The Greatest Giant of Goan Brahmin community" and opened the floodgates to Christianity in Chorão.
Crisna	Tanador Mor (Village Judicial Authority), One of the Chief Brahmins of Goa.Helped the Portuguese in Conquest of Bardez and Salcette.
Raul Chatim (Ravala Śeṭī or Roulu Shet)	Gaunkar of Caraim, 16th century merchant and a guild head and collaborator with Afonso de Albuquerque and retained a high office in Goa. The first Goan merchant to visit Portugal whom the King of Portugal gifted honorific mount of a horse.
Vincent Alvares	Medical practitioner and chemist of his Majesty John V of Portugal.
Manuel Caetano Alvares	First Goan graduate of the Faculty of Medicine in Portugal.
Braz Fernandes	First ever Vice-Consul for Portugal in Bombay.
Rogério de Faria (Roger Faria)	Consul of Brazil and Luso-Goan businessman. referred to in Bombay Circles as "Prince Merchant".
Lucas de Lima	Theologian, jurist and canonist.
Braz Anthony Fernandes	Author, historian and co-founded the Bombay Historical Society in 1925.
Jose Maria Tito Fernandes (Xete)	architect of Capela de Nossa Senhora da Saúde (Chorão Island)
Dr Chicot Vaz	Neurophysician.
Fr Anastasio Gomes	Theologian.
Renato da Penha Gonsavles	Scientist.
Luis Xavier Correia da Graca	scholar and jurist.
Augusto da Penha Gonsalves	High Court Judge in Angola.
Nancy Rodrigues	Miss Universe (1990–91) at the International Contest among the Indians of New York.
Anthony Colaco	First Goan to participate and win gold medal at the Special Olympics 1991 for the Handicapped Minnesota, USA.
Francis Fernandes	Fingerprint expert and a former police inspector in North America.
Rev Fr. Sebastiao Xavier De Noronha	Missionary in the diocese of Mylapore for 47 years and parish priest of Vailanganni for 32 years where he worked with unabated zeal completely renovated the old small church of Our Lady of Good Health into a magnificent shrine was born in Chorão Goa on 16 July 1865

== Gallery ==
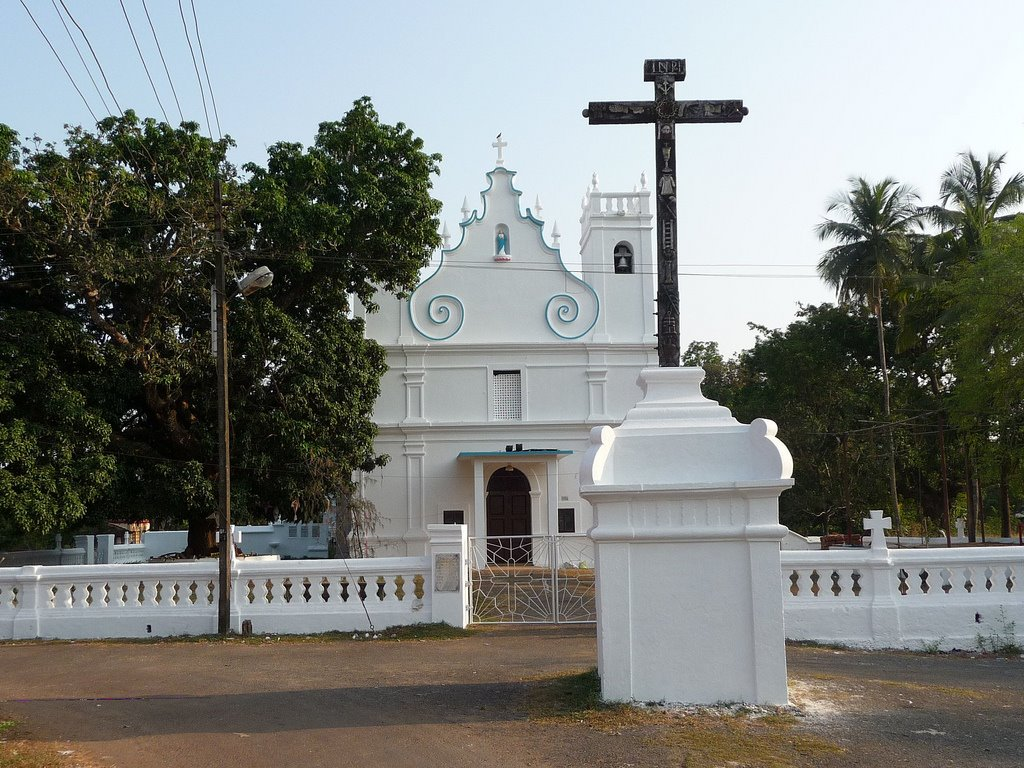
Igreja de Nossa Senhora de Graça (Our Lady of Grace Church)

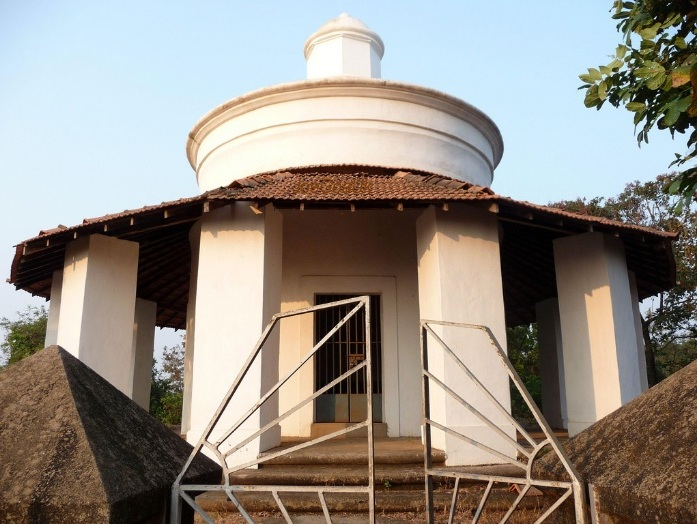
Capela de São Jerônimo (St. Jerome Chapel). Only remaining relic of the Seminary of Chorão

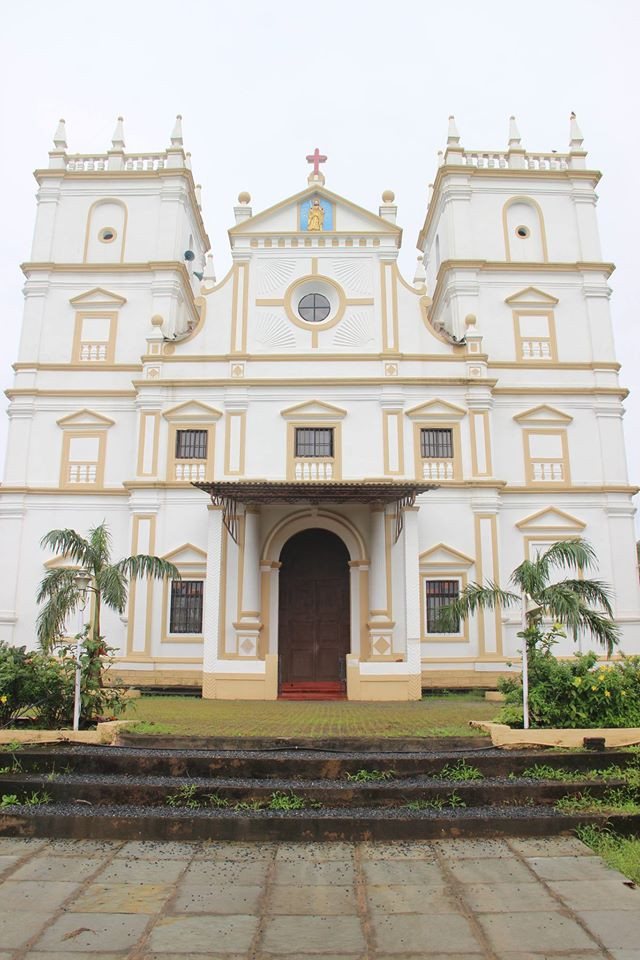
Igreja de São Bartolomeu (St Bartholomew's Church)

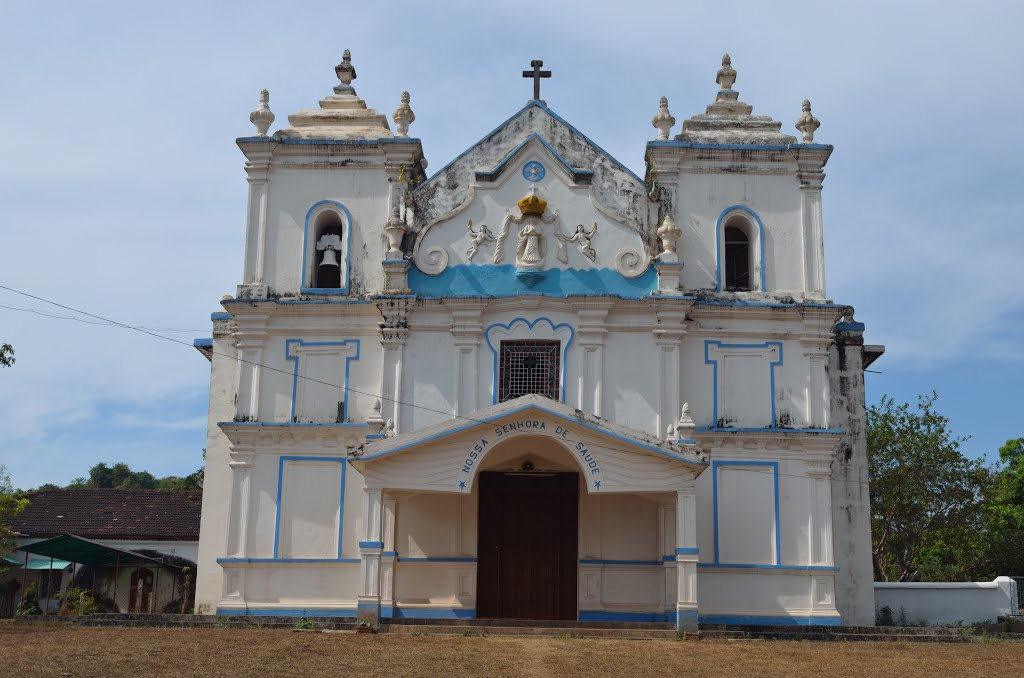
Capela de Nossa Senhora da Saúde

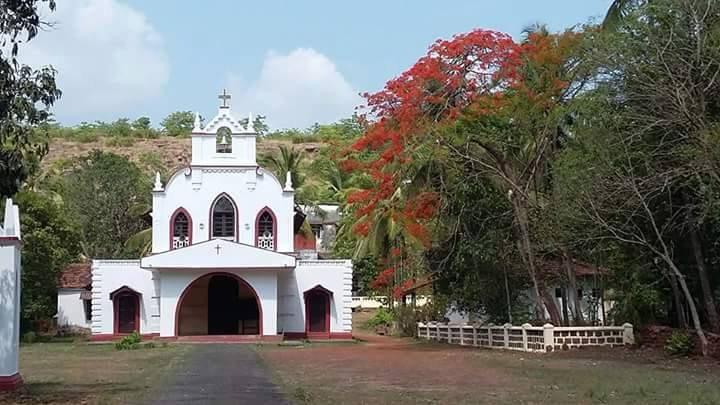
Capela de Sacra Família (Chapel of Sacra Familia)

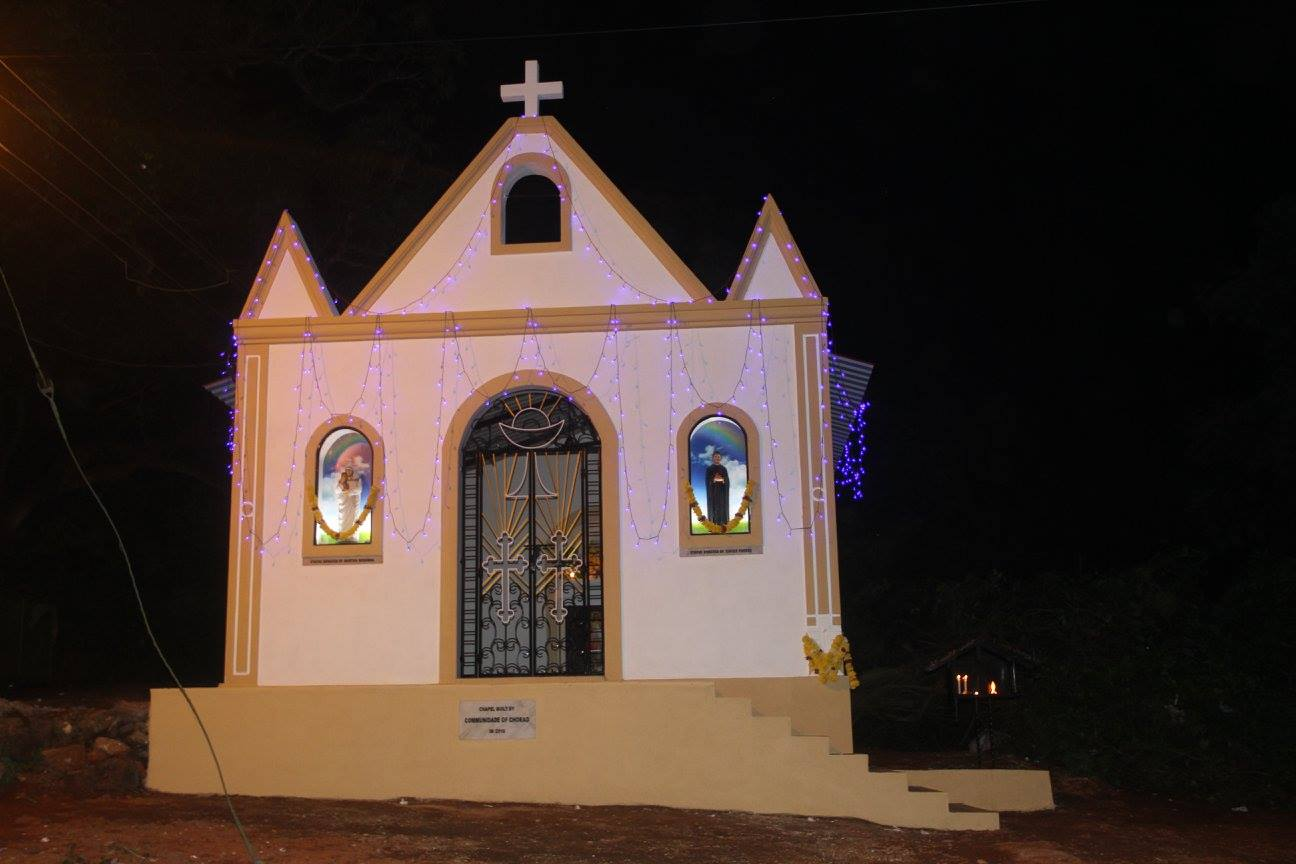
Goa's First Chapel Dedicated to Saint Teresa of Calcutta

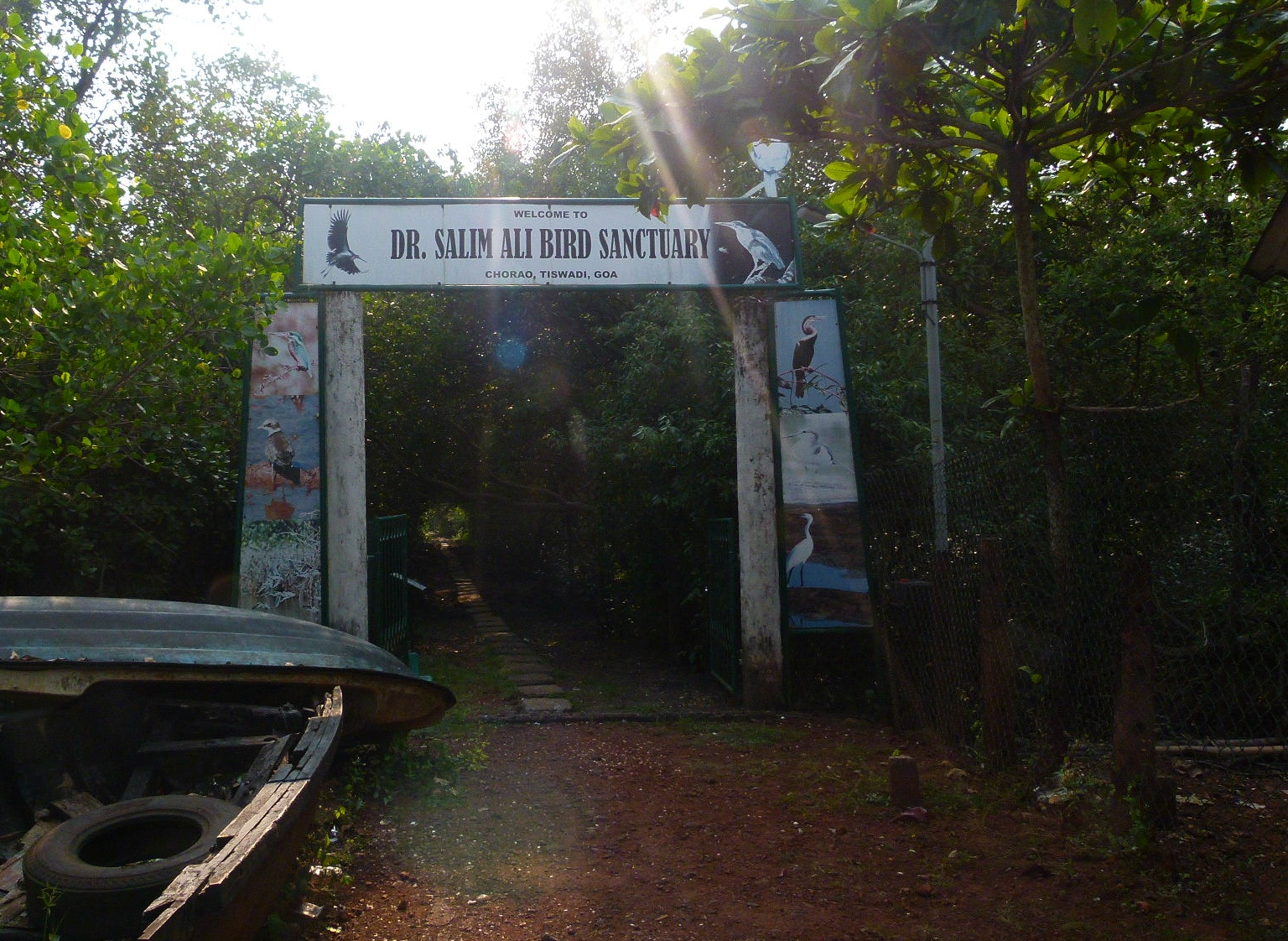
Salim Ali Sanctuary

== See also ==
- Our Lady of Grace Church (Chorão Island)
- Chapel of St. Jerome (Chorão Island)
- St Bartholomew's Church (Chorão Island)
- Capela de Nossa Senhora da Saúde (Chorão Island)
- Chapel of Sacra Familia (Chorão Island)
- Real Colégio de Educação de Chorão
- Salim Ali Bird Sanctuary
