= Capela de Nossa Senhora da Saúde =

Coordinates: 15.5491205580°N 73.891882062°E

- Chapel of Our Lady of Health
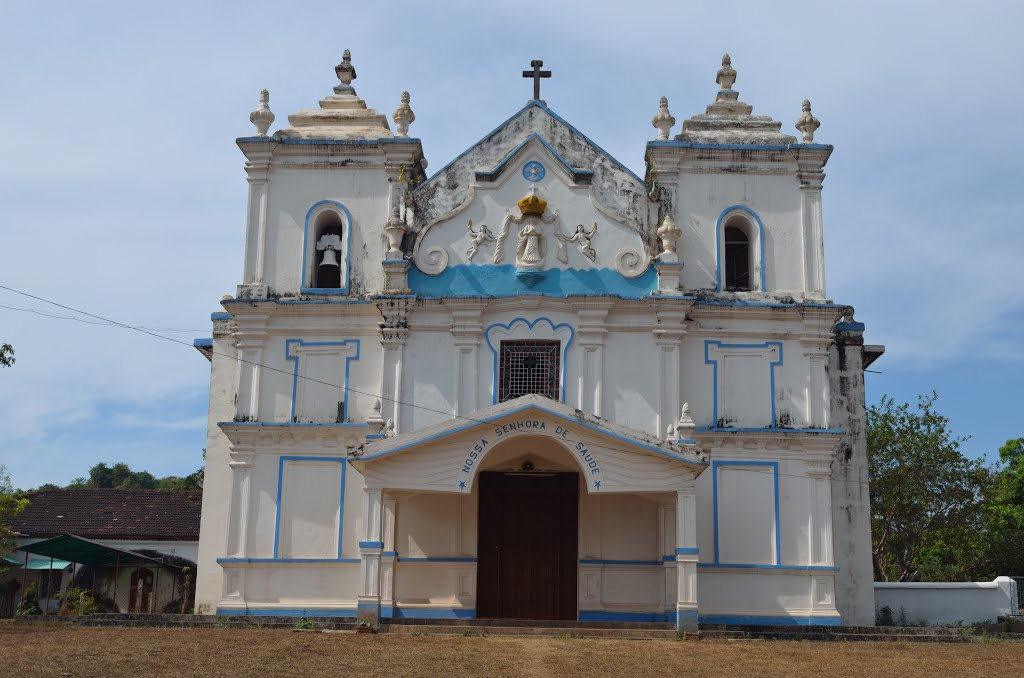
- Chapel of Our Lady of Health
- Capela de Nossa Senhora da Saúde
- Location: Chorão, Goa
- Country: India
- Denomination: Roman Catholic

History
- Status: Chapel
- Founded: 1705; 321 years ago
- Dedication: Our Lady of Health

Architecture
- Architect: Jose Maria Tito Fernandes
- Style: Baroque

Administration
- Archdiocese: Archdiocese of Goa and Daman

The Capela de Nossa Senhora da Saúde or the Chapel of Our Lady of Health, is a Roman Catholic chapel on the island of Chorão in Goa, India. It was originally built in 1705.

== History ==
Tradition has it that this chapel is the most antique monument in the island of Chorão and it was built at the expense of the Comunidade of Chorão.

The chapel was re-built in 1940 and blessed on 24 April 1942. The original facade of the old chapel including the towers were left untouched. Jose Maria Tito Fernandes, the Architect who was mainly instrumental in rebuilding the chapel and in putting up such a fine structure.

The chapel has three altars. The main altar is dedicated to the patroness, Nossa Senhora da Saúde, and the lateral ones to St. Joseph and St. Sebastian.

The chapel has the Stations of the Cross which have been canonically erected.

At the expense of Benedito Quadros a Grotto dedicated to Our Lady of Lourdes has been built in the compound of the chapel. It was blessed on 27 April 1948.

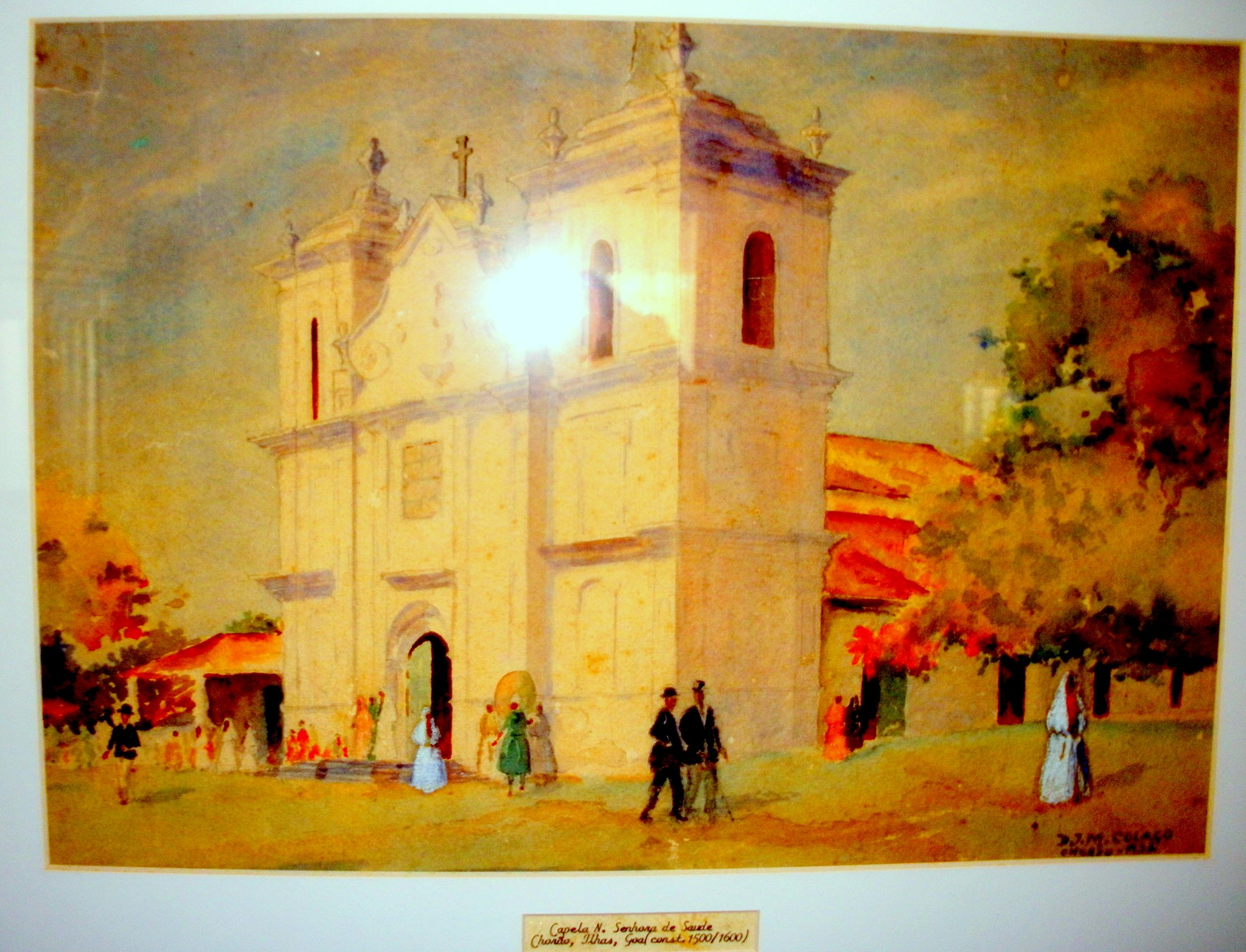
Capela de Nossa Senhora da Saúde Goa const.1500-1600

== See also ==
- Our Lady of Grace Church (Chorão Island)
- St Bartholomew's Church (Chorão Island)
- Real Colégio de Educação de Chorão
