= Timeline of Goan history =

This is a timeline of Goan history. It overlaps with the histories of other regions in South Asia, the Indian subcontinent, and colonial powers that influenced the region, including Kingdom of Portugal.

== Stone Age ==
- c. 80,000 – c. 100,000, B.P. (Before Portuguese) Arrival of modern Homo sapiens in the basin of Mandovi and Zuari as evidenced from Acheulean handaxes.
- c. 80,000 – c. 8000 B.P. Stone Age of Goa, cave dwellings, hunter-gatherer society, humans migrate from the river banks towards the coast in search of sea salt, the first rudimentary petroglyphs (Usgao), birth of shamanism and cult of earth goddess
- Micro > Neolithism > Megalithism
- c. 8000 – c. 4000 B.P. Critical and exciting period of Goan Neolithism and Chalcolithism, the nomadic people of Kushavati culture, golden age of petroglyphs and rock art in Goa; shamanistic nomadic society, animal trappers, fishers, discovery of edible plants, tubers, mushrooms, worship of ant hill goddess, a nature worship, origin of Dhalo; origin of Perni jagor mask dance drama, a smooth transition of Neolithic to megalithic society (dolmens, menhirs) towards the end
- c. 6000 – c. 4000 B.P. Drop in sea level, Marine fossil beds at Bambolim, Siridao, Camurlim, etc.
- c. 3600 B.P. entry of horses and pottery in Goa, megalithism, first attempts to make salt from sea water, silt based farming in river valleys, development of trade routes, influence and contact with Indus civilization, Harappan seafarers

== Antiquity ==
- c. 1000–800 BC Primitive agriculture: the Kumeri or burn and shift agriculture and the reclamation of coastal mangroves for preparing khazan lands, probable birth of Gaonkaris (latter-day communidades) of Goa, common land ownership, Iron Age in Goa, first ploughs.
- 500 BC Jainism and Buddhist influence in south India spreads to Goa (the following chronology would be expanded later)
- up to 200 BC Imperial Mauryan rule
- up to AD 200 Imperial Satavahanas of Pratishthan, Western Kshatrapas Roman trade contacts, beginning of Arab trade in horses

Age of dynastic rule-golden period of maritime history

- AD 200–400 many minor dynasties and feudatories (Chutus, Maharathis, Kadambas of Halsi, Kuras of Kolhapur)
- AD 400–600 Bhojas of Chandor (Chandrapur/Sindbur to Arabs)
- AD 500–800 Badami Chalukyas, Konkan Mauryas, etc., embassy to Persia. Boost in horse trade, migration of Kaundinya seafarers from Goa to south east Asia

== Middle Ages ==
- AD 800–1000 Shilahara branches, imperial Rashtrakutas of Malkhed, Spread of Arab trading settlements (Anjumans)
- AD 1000–1330 Goa Kadambas (detail chronology is being compiled), (Devagiri Yadavas, gangas, Hoysalas, etc.)

=== Islamic influence ===
- 1326–1380 Bahamani rulers
- 1380–1472 Under Vijayanagara rule the Hindu ruler started construction of temples in Goa on Buddhist temples all the way to Kanada present-day Karnataka
- 1472–1510 Adilshahi rule (details to be added)
- (a separate chronology of new conquest areas before their annexation by Portuguese needs to be compiled as these territories at different times were ruled by adilshahi, Marathas, kings of sundas, Bhonsles of wadi, Dessais, etc. from 1510 to 1793)
- (definitive and accurate chronology of the period 200 AD to 1510 AD is possible based on epigraphical, archaeological, architectural, iconographic, numismatic records and publications-but many scholars need to contribute from Maharashtra, Karnataka, Kerala and Gujarath)

== Portuguese India ==
=== 1500s ===
- 1505 – The construction of Fort Anjediva begins. It was one of the first four forts commissioned by Manuel I of Portugal to Dom Francisco de Almeida in India.
- 10 December 1510 – Afonso de Albuquerque accepts the surrender of the forces of Yusuf Adil Shah.
- 31 January 1533 – Diocese of Goa is established as a suffragan of the newly created Archdiocese of Funchal by Pope Paul III. Francisco de Melo was appointed its bishop but never took the possession. This created an episcopal see of Goa, having jurisdiction of all Portuguese conquests from the Cape of Good Hope to China and Japan.
- 6 May 1542 – 36-year-old Jesuit missionary, Francis Xavier of Navarre, arrives in Goa.
- 1545 – João III of Portugal orders João de Castro to establish schools for Christian doctrine (escolas de doutrina) in the villages where students were taught music (solfeggio), violin and the organ in addition to the three R's. This music (which was wholly religious) was taught for congregational participation during Church services. In the 19th century, these village schools became known as Parish Schools (escolas paroquiais). Early exposure to and love for Western Music produces many Goan musicians who are recognized internationally for their ability to play all of its genres; 19th-century Salcete will become the birthplace of the Mando - a particularly Goan form of music.
- 1546 – Francis Xavier requests the installation of the Goa Inquisition for the "New Christians" in a letter dated 16 May 1546 to King João III of Portugal, but his request will be carried out only in 1560.
- 3 December 1552 – Francis Xavier dies off the coast of China.
- 1555 – Holy Magi Church of Reis Magos is the first church built in Bardez.
- 1556 – pt:João Nunes Barreto, the Patriarch of Abyssinia (roughly corresponding to the current-day Ethiopia) introduces the printing press to Goa; situated at the Jesuit College of Saint Paul at Old Goa, it is the first in all of Asia. The first book published that year is the Conclusiones Philosophicas.
- 4 February 1557 – Pope Paul IV separated the Goan diocese from the ecclesiastical province of Lisbon and raised it to a metropolitan archdiocese, with the suffragan dioceses of Diocese of Cochin and Diocese of Malacca. In the course of time other dioceses were included in the metropolitan area of Goa such as Macau, Funai, Cranganore, Meliapor, Nanjing, Beijing, Mozambique and Díli.
- 1557 – The printing press publishes its second book, Catecismo da Doutrina Christã, posthumously, five years after the death of its author, St. Francis Xavier. The Patriarch of Abyssinia was residing in Goa at the time and offering his episcopal services till the appointment of the first Archbishop of Goa, Gaspar Jorge de Leão Pereira in 1558.
- 1558 – André Vaz is ordained as the first native Goan priest of the Catholic church.
- 1560 – Safa Masjid is built by the Bijapuri ruler Ibrahim Adil Shah I.
- 1565 – Igreja de Nossa Senhora das Neves, Rachol is the first church built in Salcette.
- 1571 – War of the League of the Indies, the Portuguese successfully defend Ilhas.
- 13 December 1572 – Pope Gregory XIII grants the archbishop of Goa the title of "Primate of the East".
- 25 July 1583 – Cuncolim Massacre of Christian priests and civilians by Hindu Kshatriyas.

=== 1600s ===
- 1615 – Canonization of St. Francis Xavier, still a figure of widespread devotion among Goa's Catholic population, who is known to Goans as Goencho Saib.
- 1619 - Se Cathedral, the cathedral of the Latin Rite Roman Catholic Archdiocese of Goa and Daman, is completed.
- 1634 - Ponte de Linhares, was completed. It connects Ribandar with Panjim . The 3.2 km route was the longest causeway in Asia at the time of its completion.
- 1635 - Matheus de Castro is appointed as the first Indian Bishop of the Catholic church.
- 1638 - Battle of Goa was fought between the Portuguese and the Dutch as part of Dutch-Portuguese War of the 1600s.
- 30 September 1639 - A second naval battle resulted in Dutch victory.
- 21 April 1651 – Birth of St. Joseph Vaz, who would, three-and-half centuries later, become the first Goan to be beatified (on 21 January 1995) and also the first Goan to be canonized (14 January 2015).
- 1667 - The first known translation of any Christian Scripture in an Indian language was done to Konkani by Ignazio Arcamone, an Italian Jesuit.
- After 1668 - Portuguese Indian rupia currency was introduced. It equalled 2 "Xerafim".
- 1683 - Invasion of Goa by Sambhaji. Many battles were fought in a span of 3 months between the Maratha Empire and the Portuguese Empire. Marathas captured several forts in Goa temporarily which made no permanent territorial changes. Marathas retreated on 2 January 1684.

=== 1700s ===
- 31 May 1756 - Abbé Faria (José Custódio de Faria) was born. A Luso-Goan Catholic monk became one of the pioneers of the scientific study of hypnotism.
- 1770 - Fontainhas was established in Panjim by Antonio Joao de Sequeira (Mossmikar).
- 5 August 1787 – Denunciation of the Conspiracy of the Pintos, an event in which a section of the local population sought to fight Portuguese rule in Goa. Curiously, Fr. José Vaz from Anjuna was among the priests denounced and detained.

=== 1800s ===
- 1802–1813 - Several British Army troops are posted in different corners of Goa to protect it from a possible French invasion during the Napoleonic Wars. British Cemetery near the Governor's Palace at Dona Paula is a legacy of this period.
- 1818 - The New Testament was translated into Konkani in Roman script.
- 21 December 1821 – Goa's first newspaper Gazetta de Goa was published by the Government printing press in Goa, the Imprensa Nacional which was an official government document containing local and international news.
- 14 June 1822 - At 1822 Portuguese legislative election, three "Deputados" representing Portuguese India were elected namely Bernardo Peres da Silva, pt:Constâncio Roque da Costa, both Goans and pt:António José Lima Leitão, a Portuguese.
- 29 October 1826 – the Government suspended Gazetta de Goa publication.
- 15 September 1832 - Goa State Central Library (oldest public library in India) is inaugurated by Viceroy Dom pt:Manuel de Portugal e Castro as "The Publica Livraria of the Academia Militar de Goa".
- 27 May – 6 June 1835 – Bernardo Peres da Silva, first native prefect (governor) of Portuguese India, was expelled by the White-dominated military in Goa and he departed to Bombay (Mumbai). While in exile, he sought financial aid from a Goan opium trader named Rogério de Faria, and set out with an expeditionary force. However, because of miscalculation of the monsoons, the fleet was destroyed upon the rocks of Vengurla. Despite this stumbling block, Peres da Silva won re-election for three subsequent terms to the Portuguese Parliament in Lisbon. Though he expressed unhappiness because his fellow members of parliament ignored him and were often absent during his pleas for the civil rights of Goa and Goans, he did not cease to campaign for Goa. He is buried in the cemetery of Prazeres in Portugal.
- 13 June 1835 to 30 November 1837 – a government journal the Chronica Constitucional was published
- 7 December 1837 – brought into existence the Boletim do Governo do Estado da India a weekly paper which was later renamed the Boletim Oficial do Estado da India. It remained a weekly from September 1879 and April 1880 when it came out three times a week until 1 May 1882. It became a daily paper until 30 November 1887, when it once again reverted to its three times a week status until 1897 and finally twice a week. In 1899 the paper did not carry any news or historical items.
- 1841 - Panjim post office was notified to be the head post office of Goa.
- 5 November 1842 – Escola Medico-Cirurgica de Goa was established. This was probably the first medical school of Western medicine in Asia. The school was started as Hospital Militar (later known as Hospital Regimental, Hospital Central and Hospital Escolar) at Pangim or Nova Goa. The graduates of Goas medical school made significant contributions in the field of medicine in Goa and beyond it, particularly in Africa where they worked as general practitioners and specialists in various branches of medicine.
- 1843 - The capital of Goa was shifted from Velha Goa to Nova Goa and Panjim town was elevated to the status of a city on 22 March 1843 making it the oldest civic institution (Corporation of the City of Panaji) in Asia.
- 1852 – 1855 – Dipaji Rane revolted against the Portuguese. He captured the fort of Nanuz in Sattari and launched his attacks from there. This went on for around five years. Finally the Portuguese authorities made peace with Dipaji Rane and pardoned all the rebels restoring their rights.
- 1858 – Bernardo Francisco da Costa (who was a member of the Portuguese Parliament from 1853 to 1869) founded his own printing press in Margão and published O Ultramar, the following year; it was Goa's first privately published newspaper.
- 1866 - Os Brahamanes (The Brahmans) was written by Francisco Luis Gomes and became the first Goan to publish a novel.
- 1868 - Banco Nacional Ultramarino opens its first Goan branch at Panjim. Currently State Bank of India is operating through the same structure.
- 1869 – 71 – A revolt was led by Kustohba Rane. He wreaked havoc in the Portuguese territories for two years. He was assassinated outside his house on 13 June 1871.
- 1870 - The Goa civil code was introduced after Portuguese Goa and Damaon were elevated from being a mere province to the status of a Província Ultramarina (Overseas possession).
- 1878 - Under the Anglo-Portuguese Treaty of 1878, Mormugao was identified as having one of the best natural harbours and the work of modernising the port was undertaken by The Western Indian Portuguese Guaranteed Railway Company. The work began in 1878 and the Mormugao Port was commissioned in 1885. The treaty allowed British India to have monopoly over the salt trade in Goa. Moreover, contraction of the Goan economy took place due to the large scale emigration of Goans to British India, mostly to Bombay. The treaty was terminated in 1892.
- 23 January 1886 - Pope Leo XIII, through the bull Humanae Salutis Auctor, invested the Archbishop of Goa with the honorary title of Patriarch of the East Indies. António Sebastião Valente became the first Patriarch of the East Indies.
- 1887 - The first English medium high school of Goa, St. Joseph High School, Arpora was established by William Robert Lyons, a Jesuit scholar.
- December 1887- A meter-gauge railway track of 43 km between Mormugao-Sanvordem via Vasco da Gama was inaugurated. In 1888 it was extended till Castle Rock Railway Station.
- 21 September 1890 - Vasco Guedes de Carvalho e Meneses ordered his armed men to fire upon the civilians who had gathered around the Holy Spirit Church, Margao to protest the malpractices done by the government during the Camara Municipal de Salcete election held earlier on that day. 23 Goans lost their lives.
- 17 April 1892 - Costancio Lucasinho Caridade Ribeiro (Lucasinho Ribeiro) from Assagao along with João Agostinho Fernandes from Borda, Margao and Caetaninho Fernandes of Taleigao presented the first tiatr performance ever, Italian Bhurgo, adapted from an Italian operetta, was staged at the New Alfred Theatre, Bombay. On 17 April 1996, first Tiatr Dis (Tiatr Day) was celebrated by Kala Academy.
- 27 October 1892 - Swami Vivekananda arrived in Goa. He studied at Rachol Seminary and also visited several prominent temples over a course of week's time.
- 1895 -The first original tiatr script was written and directed by João Agostinho Fernandes, entitled The Belle of Cavel or Sundori Cavelchi in Bombay. He was conferred the title Pai Tiatrist (Father Tiatrist).

=== 1900s ===
- 22 January 1900 - O Heraldo was established as the first daily Portuguese newspaper by Aleixo Clemente Messias Gomes and Luís de Menezes Bragança in Goa.It was later transformed into an English daily in 1983.
- 3 December 1901 – A launch crossing Mandovi from Betim to Panaji ran aground which killed 81 people on the feast day.
- 13 March 1902 – Dada Rane and his 22 "accomplices" sentenced to exile to East Timor. They embarked on 26 March 1902. Dada and his son Indroji died in Timor, but others had their term of exile reduced and are believed to have returned to Goa. One of them, Santoba Rane participated in yet another and final revolt in 1912.
- 22 November 1904 - Regina Fernandes, wife of the playwright João Agostinho Fernandes, became the first female tiatr actor in Batcara.
- 29 October 1914 – birth of Silvestre Micael Feliciano Martins in Orlim; prolific Goan composer and musician.
- 1917 - The "Carta Organica" law was passed, overseeing all civil liberties in Goa.
- 1917 - thirty-one settlements were carved out of the Salcete to form Mormugao taluka (sub-district).
- 1 May 1928 - The Diocese of Daman was dissolved. The Metropolitan Archdiocese of Goa was renamed to Metropolitan Archdiocese of Goa and Daman.
- 1928 - Tristão de Bragança Cunha founded the Goa National Congress and got it affiliated to All-India Congress Committee in 1938 and moved its operation to Bombay.
- May 1930 - Portugal passed the "Acto Colonial" (Portuguese Colonial Act), which restricted political rallies and meetings within all Portuguese colonies. It was repealed later in 1950 by the efforts of Froilano de Mello.
- 1930 - The 16th edition of All India Marathi Literary Conference was held in Margao. The conferences of 1964 and 1994 were also held in Goa.
- 9–10 March 1943 - Operation Creek was carried out by members of Calcutta Light Horse and Calcutta Scottish at Mormugao harbour. They successfully attacked the German cargo ship Ehrenfels which had been transmitting information about the movement of allied ships.
- 11 January 1946 - The Church of Bom Jesus was made a Basilica. It is the first basilica of India.
- April 1946 - Polícia do Estado da Índia was formed. It replaced the Corpo de Polícia e Fiscalização da Índia (CPFI).
- July 1946 - Ram Manohar Lohia and Juliao Menezes addressed a meeting in Panjim on 15 June and then another one on 18 June (Goa Revolution Day) in Margao. Portuguese didn't intervene the first meet but at Margao meeting they were arrested and taken to jail.
- 24 April 1950 - Mogacho Anvddo produced and directed by Jerry Braganza became the first full-length Konkani film. This day is celebrated as Konkani cinema Day.
- 4 December 1950 - Valerian Gracias was appointed as the first native Indian Archbishop in India. Later on 29 December 1952, he also became the first Cardinal from India.
- 1951 - Goa First Division began and it was organised by the Conselho de Desportos. The first League champion of Goa was Clube Desportivo de Chinchinim who beat Football Club of Siolim, to clinch the title.
- 1953 - Kesarbai Kerkar, an Indian classical vocalist from Keri, became the first woman to win the Sangeet Natak Akademi Award.
- 1953 - The Government of India closes its legation in Lisbon, following tensions between the two countries over the future of Portuguese colonies in South Asia.
- 1954 - India annexed the enclaves of Dadra and Nagar Haveli (near Daman)
- 1954–1955 - In 1954, National Congress Goa led a Satyagraha movement in Goa and in 1955 Azad Gomantak Dal organised a satyagraha. Some exiled Goans aided Goa Liberation Movement and Indian nationalists in a Gandhi-style campaign which failed due to little local support. 32 Satyagrahis were shot dead by the Portuguese.
- 1 September 1955 - India shut its consul office in Goa.
- 1955 - The Aeroporto de Dabolim (later officially renamed to Aeroporto General Bénard Guedes) was built in 1955 by the Government of the Estado da Índia, on 249 acres (101 ha) of land. Until 1961, the airport served as the main hub of the Portuguese India's airline TAIP (Transportes Aéreos da Índia Portuguesa).
- 1957 - "Estaleiros Navais de Goa" is established to build barges to support Goa's growing mining industry. Currently it manufacturers warships for the Indian Navy and the Indian Coast Guard.
- 1958 - Portuguese Indian rupia was replaced by Portuguese Indian escudo. One rupia was equal to 6 escudos. After 1961, the currency was nullified and Indian Rupee was declared as the currency of Goa.
- 1958 - Anjanibai Malpekar, an Indian classical singer of Malpe, Pernem became the first woman to be awarded the Sangeet Natak Akademi Fellowship.
- 10 June 1959 - Dutch aircraft Martin PBM-5A Mariner en route to the Netherlands from Indonesia experienced engine trouble and therefore diverged to Dabolim airport but it crashed at Alto Mangor, Vasco. All the eight crew died.
- 1959 - The Goa Football Association was established as the official administrative body of football in Goa.
- 26 January 1960 - Vithal Nagesh Shirodkar, an obstetrician and gynaecologist, born in Shiroda, became the first Goan to receive Padma Bhushan and later in 1971, he also became the first Goan to receive Padma Vibhushan for his contribution to medicine.
- 26 October 1960 - His Highness the Aga Khan IV was decorated with the Grand Cross of the Order of Prince Henry the Navigator by Governor General Vassalo e Silva at Cabo Palace.
- 1961 - Leslie Buddy D'Souza was the first awardee of Arjuna Award in Boxing. He also became the first Goan origin person to win an Arjuna Award.
- 8 March 1961 – In a UN debate, V. K. Krishna Menon (India) described the Portuguese overseas territories as a "slave empire" and declared that the "liberation of Goa" was "part of the unfinished task of liberating India."
- 1 April. 1961 – Jawaharlal Nehru announced in India's lower house of parliament, the Lok Sabha that the Government of India had decided to relax the ban on trade with Goa and the other small, scattered Portuguese colonies in India with immediate effect, "as part of its policy of liberalization."
- 23 October 1961 – India's prime minister Jawaharlal Nehru in a Bombay speech referred to increasing reports of "terror and torture" by the Portuguese authorities in Goa and declared that "the time has come for us to consider afresh what method should be adopted to free Goa from Portuguese rule."
- 24 November 1961 - Sabarmati, a passenger boat passing between Angediva and Kochi, was fired upon by Portuguese ground troop stationed at Angediva resulting in injuries to the chief engineer of the boat and the death of a passenger.
- 1 December 1961 - Dilip Sardesai becomes the first Goan to play international cricket for India.
- 9 Dec 1961 - The vessel India arrived at Mormugão port en route to Lisbon from Timor. 700 Portuguese civilians of European origin boarded the ship and fled Goa.
- 17 December 1961 – The long-standing tension between India and Portugal over the question of what was described variously as the Portuguese "territories", "enclaves" or "colonies" in South Asia—Goa, and the small enclaves of Daman and Diu—culminated in the annexation of Goa after a brief (48 hours) military campaign by an estimated 30,000 Indian troops pitted against Portugal's 3,000 troops, 900 Goan police and no air or naval power. See Operation Vijay (1961)
- 18 December 1961 - The 50th Parachute Brigade (India) moved into Goa at Thivim, Ponda via Usgao and Panjim via Banastarim. The two Indian air raids destroyed Dabolim Airport runway. The third Indian air raid damaged the wireless station at Bambolim. The Indian Naval Command assigned the task of securing Anjidiv to the cruiser INS Mysore and the frigate INS Trishul under the command of Lieutenant Arun Auditto stormed the island and secured it the next day.
- 19 December 1961 – The Indian tricolour flag was hoisted in Goa, in front of the Pangim seat of state power.

== Recent history ==
=== 1960s ===
- 19 December 1961 – Major General Kunhiraman Palat Candeth is appointed as the military governor of Goa.
- March 1962 – The Estado da India (Portuguese 'state of India') is formally incorporated into India.
- 2 April 1962 - The President of India nominated Pundalik Gaitonde and Antonio Colaço as Members of Parliament for the 3rd Lok Sabha from Panaji and Mormugao respectively.
- 26, 27 May 1962 - Eighth Adhiveshan of All India Konkani Parishad was held at Margão. It was the first session held in Goa. Dr.Manohar Rai Sardesai presided over it. The 10th (1974), 14th (1982), 18th (1990), 19th (1993), 25th (2006), 27th (2010) and 30th (2016) sessions were also held in Goa.
- 13 June 1962 – Repatriation of Portuguese detainees in Goa. - Creation of Union Territory of Goa, Daman, and Diu.
- 11 August 1962 – Portugal announces cancellation of 'residence permits' of Indian nationals. Liquidation of Indian assets. Repatriation of Indians from the Portuguese East African colony of Mozambique.
- 24 October 1962 - First Panchayat Elections were held in Goa.
- 1962 - INS Hansa was transferred from Coimbatore, Tamil Nadu to Dabolim. It is one of the 10 naval air stations of India.
- 22 May 1963 – Prime Minister of India, Jawaharlal Nehru, visits Goa.
- 15 November 1963 – Francisco Xavier da Piedade Rebelo is appointed auxiliary bishop of Goa, was consecrated on 21 December 1963 by James Knox, Apostolic Internuncio in India .
- 3 December 1963 – The first general elections to be held in the Union Territory of Goa, Daman, and Diu resulted in the heaviest electoral defeat ever suffered by the Indian National Congress party, which then ruled much of the rest of India. The distribution of seats in the Legislative Assembly was as follows: Maharashtrawadi Gomantak 13, United Goans 13, 2 Praja Socialist Party, 1 Congress and 1 Independent. Elections to two seats in the 3rd Lok Sabha (the Indian lower house of parliament) were held at the same time, both being won by the Maharashtrawadi Gomantak. North Goa elected Peter Augustus Alvares and South Goa elected Mukund Shinkre. Dayanand Bandodkar, a Marathi politician, was elected leader of the Maharashtrawadi Gomantak Party on 14 December. Pandurang Shirodkar was elected as the first speaker of the Goa Legislative Assembly.
- 1963 - Government Polytechnic, Panaji, the first polytechnic college of Goa offered diploma programs in civil, mechanical and electrical engineering in its inaugural year.
- 20 June 1964 - Casimiro Monteiro, a Portuguese PIDE agent of Goan descent, along with Ismail Dias, a Goan settled in Portugal, executed bombings at Cortalim, Ponda, Margao and Tisk, Ponda.
- 1964 - Institute of Nursing Education commences at Bambolim, Goa.
- 1964 - Carmel College of Arts, Science for Women established at Nuvem, Goa. It holds the distinction for being the first and only college for women in Goa.
- 1964 – Saw the arrival of "Eight Finger Eddie" who is credited with popularising Goa as a hippie destination. He made his first trip to Iran, India and Nepal, eventually settling for a period at Colva in Goa. Around 1966, he settled at Anjuna beach in Goa.
- 23 January 1965 – The Goa Legislative Assembly passed a resolution in favour of the merger of Goa with Maharashtra. The resolution was supported by the ruling Maharashtrawadi Gomantak, but was strongly opposed by the United Goan and Congress parties.
- February 1965 - Panjim Carnival was invented by Timoteo Fernandes, a Goan musician who modeled it after the famed Rio Carnival.
- 1965 - Nirmon, a Konkani film directed by A. Salam and produced by Frank Fernand, won the Certificate of Merit in regional category at the 13th National Film Awards. The film starred Shalini Mardolkar, C. Alvares, Anthony D'Sa, Jacinto Vaz, Antonette Mendes, Ophelia Cabral, Jack Souza Ferrão and J. P. Souzalin.
- 1965 - Panjim Residency is established by Government of Goa. Currently there are 11 residencies all over Goa under the Goa Tourism Development Corporation (GTDC) banner.
- 1 January 1966 - The National Institute of Oceanography, India is set up at Dona Paula. It is an autonomous research organization in India to undertake scientific research and studies of special oceanographic features of the Northern Indian Ocean.
- 1966 - Goa Industrial Development Corporation is formed. Corlim Industrial Estate is established as the first Industrial Estate of Goa.
- 1966 – Reita Faria was crowned Miss World 1966 and also became the first Asian to win the beauty pageant contest.
- 16 January 1967 – Opinion Poll, the first one of its kind, conducted regarding the controversy over the merger of Goa with Maharashtra. Result: For 138,170. Against 172,191
- 26 January 1967 - Balakrishna Bhagwant Borkar (also known as Baa-ki-baab), a Goan poet became the first Goan to receive Padma Shri.
- February 1967 - At 1967 Indian general election, North Goa elected Janardan Jagannath Shinkre, an independent and South Goa elected Erasmo de Sequeira of United Goans (Sequeria Group).
- 28 March 1967 – 1967 Goa, Daman & Diu Legislative Assembly election. 16 MGP, 12 UGP (Sequeira Group) and 2 independents were elected.
- 5 April 1967 – Dayanand B. Bandodkar, leader of the Maharashtrawadi Gomantak, formed the Government after fresh elections.
- 1967 – Goa Engineering College starts with undergraduate courses in Mechanical, Civil and Electrical Engineering.
- 1968 - Vasco S.C. won the first edition of Goa Police Cup. In 1969 they defeated Border Security Force SC 1–0 to become the first Goan side to win Sait Nagjee Football Tournament.
- 1968 - Institute of Hotel Management, Catering Technique and Applied Nutrition, Goa (Formerly known as Food Craft Institute), was established in 1968 at Porvorim. IHM Goa started offering diploma courses in 1984 and degree programmes from 2002 onwards. At present, there are 46 IHM all over India.
- 1969 - Bhagwan Mahaveer Sanctuary is declared as the first Wildlife Sanctuary of Goa. It is one of 6 wildlife sanctuaries of Goa.
- 1969 - Lorna Cordeiro (Nightingale of Goa), released her first single Bebdo.

=== 1970s ===
- February 1970 - Kala Academy (Academy of the Arts), a cultural centre run by the Government of Goa, is established at Campal, Panjim. It is registered as a society. The building was designed by Charles Correa.
- March 1971- At 1971 Indian general election, North Goa elected Purushottam Kakodkar of Congress and South Goa elected Erasmo de Sequeira of UGP (Sequeria Group).
- 1971 - First Kendriya Vidyalaya of Goa was established at Mangor, Mormugao.
- 1971 – First Mandovi Bridge built.
- 23 March 1972 – 1972 Goa, Daman & Diu Legislative Assembly election. MGP number rose to 18, UGP (Sequeira Group) slid to 10 and 1 Congress and 1 independent secured seats. Dayanand Balakrishna Bandodkar was sworn in for a third term as Chief Minister.
- 1972 - The Goa College of Art was founded by the Kala Academy. It was taken over by the Government of Goa and came under the administrative control of the Department of Education on 1 June 1983.
- 1972 - Flame-throated bulbul was selected as the official state bird of Goa.
- 1972–73 – Goa hosted the Santosh Trophy tournament for the first time. Goa again hosted the tournament in 1989–90, 1995–96, and 2016–17.
- 1 March 1973 - Farmagudi Government Industrial Training Institute, the first ITI of Goa is established. It is one of the 13 ITIs of Goa.
- 12 August 1973 – Death of Dayanand Balakrishna Bandodkar (62), who had been Chief Minister of Goa, Daman and Diu since the first general elections in 1963, dies while in office. His daughter, Mrs. Shashikala Kakodkar, who had been Minister of State for Health is sworn in as the new chief minister.
- 1973 - Mahadevrao Salgaocar College of Law is established and it became the first law college of Goa.
- 1974 - Dempo S.C. defeated Tata's Sports Club 2-1 and thereby became first Goan club to win Rovers Cup.
- 24 September 1974 – An agreement was signed in New York City by the Foreign Minister of Portugal, Dr. Mario Soares, and the Indian Minister of External Affairs, Swaran Singh, according to which the Lisbon government expressed its readiness to relinquish all claims to Portugal's former Indian territories of Goa, Daman, Diu, Dadra and Nagar Haveli.
- 1974 - Taj Fort Aguada Resort of Taj Hotels opens in Aguada.
- 28 December 1974 – Treaty in New Delhi providing that diplomatic relations would be resumed between India and Portugal immediately.
- 1975 - Goa Board of Secondary & Higher Secondary Education was established on 27 May 1975 under "The Goa, Daman and Diu Secondary and Higher Secondary Education Board Act, 1975".
- March 1977 - At 1977 Indian general election, North Goa elected Amrut Shivram Kansar of Maharashtrawadi Gomantak Party and South Goa elected Eduardo Faleiro of Indian National Congress.
- 1 June 1977 – 1977 Goa, Daman & Diu Legislative Assembly election. Maharashtrawadi Gomantak Party won 15, INC 10, 3 Janata Party and 2 independents. Mrs Shashikala Kakodkar was sworn in as Chief Minister on 7 June. 63.22% poll percentage of this election is the lowest ever in Goan assembly election history. Pernem, (or Dargalim from 1989 to 2007) has been reserved for scheduled castes since 1977.
- 23 September 1977 - Pope Paul VI appointed Blasco Francisco Collaço as Apostolic Nuncio to Panama and became the first Indian priest to have the title of "Nuncio".
- 1977 - Bhuierantlo Munis was released as the first Konkani colour film. It was produced under the banner of 'Chripton Motion Pictures' by Tony Coutinho and Chris Perry.
- 1977 - Ravindra Kelekar's work "Himalayant"(Travelogue) won the 1st Sahitya Akademi Award for Konkani.
- 1977 - Goa State Museum, also known as the State Archaeology Museum, is established at Panjim.
- 1977- The Goa Football Association introduced the Goa Super League in the season of 1977–78, with Salgaocar S.C. clinching the title.
- 30 January 1978 – Pope Paul VI through the papal bull Quoniam Archidioecesi named Raul Nicolau Gonçalves as Archbishop of Goa and Patriarch of the East Indies.
- 1978 - The core area of the Bhagwan Mahaveer WildlifeSanctuary covering 107 square kilometres (41 sq mi) was notified as Mollem National Park. It is one of the 105 National Parks in India and the only one in Goa.
- 23 April 1979 – The ruling Maharashtrawadi Gomantak lost its majority in the Goa Assembly and the Chief Minister, Mrs Shashikala Kakodkar, resigned. No stable ministry was possible and on 28 April. President's Rule was imposed pending new elections.

=== 1980s ===
- Traditional fishermen of Goa protested against mechanised fishing trawlers as part of the Ramponkar movement.
- 3 January 1980 – 1980 Goa, Daman & Diu Legislative Assembly election. The elections in Goa resulted in a victory for the Indian National Congress (U) (20) and the defeat of the Maharashtrawadi Gomantak Party (7), which had held power since 1963. Mr Pratapsingh Rane, the Congress leader, formed the Government on 17 January.
- January 1980 - At 1980 Indian general election, North Goa elected Sanyogita Rane of MGP and South Goa elected Eduardo Faleiro of INC(I).
- June 1980 - The commemoration of 4th death centenary of Luis de Camoes was held at Panjim and Manuel António Vassalo e Silva was the guest of honor.
- June 1980 - Goa Dental College, a professional college was established by the Government at Bambolim, Goa
- 5 October 1980- Divorce, a tiatr written and directed by Airistides Dias was the first Konkani tiatr to complete 100 performances.
- 1980 - Kadamba Transport Corporation abbreviated as KTC is established as Government of Goa road transport undertaking and started operating the same year.
- 1980 - The Goa Motorcycle Taxi Riders Association (GMTRA) was founded in 1980 to operate motorcycle taxis in a first of its kind venture in India.
- 1982 - Goa College of Architecture was established at Altinho, Panjim.
- 30 October 1982 – The jurisdiction of High Court of Bombay was extended to the Union territory of Goa Daman & Diu by a Parliament Act and established a permanent Bench of the High Court at Panaji.
- 1982 - Cidade de Goa was built by Charles Correa. Presently it is part of Indian Hotels Company Limited's selections.
- 1982-1983 – Goa won the Santosh Trophy for the time along with West Bengal as joint winners. Since then Goa has won it in the following years:1983–84, 1989–90, 2005–06 and 2008–09.
- 26,27 November 1983- A weekend retreat session of the Seventh meeting of Commonwealth Heads of Government Meeting was held in Goa under the chairmanship of Mrs Indira Gandhi, the Indian Prime Minister.
- 1983 – Zuari Bridge is inaugurated it reduced the time taken to travel between Margao and Panjim.
- November 1984 - The first Air charter arrived in Goa. It was a Condor aircraft belonging to the Thomas Cook Group.
- 24 December 1984 – 1984 Goa, Daman & Diu Legislative Assembly election. Congress won 18 seats in the 30-member Assembly. The Maharashtrawadi Gomantak (MAG) won eight seats, while the remaining four seats were won by independent candidates. The Chief Minister, Mr Pratap Singh Rane, was sworn in for another term on 8 January 1985.
- December 1984 - At 1984 Indian general election, North Goa elected Shantaram Naik of INC(I) and South Goa elected Eduardo Faleiro of INC(I).
- 5 June 1985 – Goa University is established and it commences its first academic year.
- 1985 – Goa cricket team made its debut in the 1985–86 season of Ranji Trophy.
- 6 February 1986 – The Pope John Paul II visited Goa as part of the 10-day Apostolic Pilgrimage to India. (6 and 7 February) Mass at Campal Grounds in Goa and Meeting with the clergy in the Basilica of Bom Jesus of Velha Goa.
- 8 March 1986 – Mother Teresa of the Missionaries of Charity visits Goa.
- 1986 - Jawahar Navodaya Vidyalaya, Canacona was established . It is under the jurisdiction of Pune region of Navodaya Vidyalaya Smiti.
- 5 July 1986 – Collapse of the Mandovi Bridge.
- November 1986- Churches and convents of Goa is declared as a cultural UNESCO World Heritage Site at the 10th annual session of the World Heritage Committee held in France.
- 19–27 December 1986 – Agitation in Goa over language issue.
- 4 February 1987 – Passage of Bill to make Konkani, the official language of Goa.
- 30 May 1987– Conferment of Statehood on Goa and Pratap Singh Rane stayed on as Chief Minister at the head of a Congress administration.
- 1 August 1987- Goa College of Music, a Govt. College affiliated to Goa University was founded at Altinho, Goa.
- 12 August 1987 – Goa becomes 25th state of India; celebrates statehood day on 30 May.
- 29 September 1987 - John F Fernandez of INC became the first Rajya Sabha MP from Goa.
- 1988 - Western Ghats is declared one of the 25 original Biodiversity hotspots of the world.
- 1988 - Salim Ali Bird Sanctuary is established at Chorao. It is one of the 47 bird sanctuaries of India and the only one in Goa.
- 1988 – Salgaocar S.C. created history by becoming the first Goan club to clinch the Federation Cup after defeating BSF 1–0.
- 1988- Government College of Arts, Science and Commerce, Sanquelim, the first government general degree college of Goa starts offering degree courses in Arts and Science.
- 1988 - Dalgado Konknni Akademi was established to promote Romi Konkani. It has been named after Sebastião Rodolfo Dalgado.
- July 1988- Goa College of Home Science (GCHS), establishes at Campal, Panjim and is till today only College of Home Science in the State of Goa.
- 1988 - Tillari (Forebay) Dam started supplying water to Goa. It currently serves Pernem, Bicholim and Bardez's domestic and irrigational use.
- February 1989 - Dominic D'Souza was detected as HIV positive. This made him Goa's patient zero.
- 1989 – Fatorda Stadium opens as a football-only stadium and was completed in a record six months time by then Sports Minister of Goa Monte D'Cruz.
- 20 January 1989 - Hungary Olympic defeated North Korea 3–0 in the first ever international football game at Fatorda stadium.
- 25 October 1989 - First International Cricket match was played in Goa at Fatorda Stadium. An ODI of the Nehru Cup tournament between Australia and Sri Lanka was held. Australia emerged victorious by 28 runs.
- November 1989- Goa Legislative Assembly capacity was increased from 30 in 1984 to 40 in 1989 elections which meant that 12 new assembly constituencies were formed.
- November 1989 – 1989 Goa Legislative Assembly election results: Congress 20, MGP 18, independents 2. Chief Minister, Pratap Singh Rane, remained in his post in a caretaker capacity overseeing negotiations designed to break the deadlock. Luizinho Faleiro was elected unopposed. This was the very first time this had happened in Goan legislative assembly history.
- November 1989 - At 1989 Indian general election, North Goa elected Gopalrao Mayenkar of MGP and South Goa elected Eduardo Faleiro of INC.

=== 1990s ===
- May 1990 - Lata Mangeshkar, (Nightingale of India), born to Pandit Deenanath Mangeshkar in Indore, received Dadasaheb Phalke Award at the 37th National Film Awards.
- 23 June 1990 - DD Panaji was launched.
- July 1990 - National Institute of Water Sports is established at Caranzalem, Panjim close to the Indian Institute of Tourism and Travel Management, Goa. It is only of its kind in South Asia.
- 1990 - Sunith Francis Rodrigues, son of a Goan father, held the post of Chief of the Army Staff of the Indian Army for 3 years.
- 14 December 1990 – President's Rule was imposed in Goa. The Chief Minister, Dr. Luis Proto Barbosa, had served in the post since he replaced interim Chief Minister Churchill Alemao on 14 April. Alemao had taken office for a brief period of a little over two weeks, in a stop-gap measure, to ensure that the new government continued to control the Speaker's office. He stepped down, as agreed earlier. Churchill Alemao is the shortest serving (18days) CM of Goa.
- 6–8 January 1991 - 3rd Plenary Assembly of Catholic Bishops of Latin Rite (CBCI) was held at Pilar, Goa.
- 25 January 1991 – President's Rule was lifted when Ravi S. Naik, was sworn in as Chief Minister.
- June 1991 - At 1991 Indian general election, North Goa elected Harish Narayan Prabhu Zantye of INC and South Goa elected Eduardo Faleiro of INC. The voter turnout of 42.39% in Goa is the lowest ever in a parliamentary election.
- 1992 – Dr. Mario Soares becomes the first Portuguese head of state to visit Goa.
- 17 May 1993 – Ravi S. Naik resigned as Chief Minister of Goa after the Goa bench of the Bombay High Court upheld his disqualification from the State Assembly under Anti-defection law. The following day, Naik's deputy, Dr.Wilfred de Souza, was sworn in as the new Chief Minister.
- 1993 - John F Fernandes of INC was re-elected as the Rajya Sabha MP from Goa.
- 1993 – Goa Institute of Management is set up at Ribandar, Goa.
- 1994 - Portugal opened its Consulate at Altinho, Panjim.
- 1994 - M. Boyer, Tiatrist from Marcaim, was awarded Sangeet Natak Akademi Award. He became the first Konkani stage artist to receive the award.
- 2 April 1994 – A political crisis precipitated by the apparently arbitrary dismissal of the Congress Chief Minister, Dr. Wilfred DeSouza, seemed to have been resolved following his reinstatement on 8 April and the dismissal of the state Governor, Bhanu Prakash Singh, a former Maharaja of a princely state in North India, reportedly on the insistence of the Congress Union government. Ravi Naik's 6 days stint is the shortest term of a CM in Goa.
- 16 December 1994 – 1994 Goa Legislative Assembly election, The assembly was made up of 18 INC, 12 MGP, 4 BJP, 3 United Goans Democratic Party and 3 independents. Pratapsing Rane of the Congress was appointed Chief Minister of a coalition government in Goa. A record number of 4 women MLAs were elected and this record stands as of 2020.
- 19 January 1995 – The Congress (I) attained an absolute majority following its alliance with the Maharashtrawadi Gomantak Party (MGP).
- 23 January 1995 – As part of the Anti-Nylon 6,6 movement, Nilesh Naik was killed during violent protests by farmers and environmental activists opposed to the construction of a Thapar-DuPont Nylon 6,6 nylon cord yarn factory which they feared would pollute the state's extensive river system. There were also industrial interests involved here, with powerful Indian players also said to be interested in the issue.
- 1 July 1995 - Raghunath Anant Mashelkar took over as the Director-General of Council of Scientific and Industrial Research and headed it for over eleven years.
- May 1996 - At 1996 Indian general election, North Goa elected Ramakant Khalap of MGP and South Goa elected Churchill Alemao of United Goans Democratic Party.
- 1 July 1996 - Gurudas Datta Kamat was appointed as the Chief Justice of Gujarat High Court and became the first Goan chief justice in India.
- October 1996 – Goa cricket team recorded its first victory in Ranji Trophy history when they defeated defending champions Karnataka cricket team by an innings and 81 runs at Campal ground, Panjim.
- 1996 - Leander Paes, professional Tennis player, received Rajiv Gandhi Khel Ratna. He is the first and only Goan origin player to win India's highest sporting honor.
- 1996 - Bruno Coutinho becomes the first Goan to win AIFF Player of the Year award.
- 19 December 1996 - Francis Silveira of Dempo S.C. became the first goan scorer of the National Football League when he grabbed the winner against Churchill Brothers.
- 1997 - Brahmanand Sankhwalkar was awarded Arjuna Award. He became the first Goan footballer to receive the award.
- 26 January 1998 - Konkan Railway started operating via Goa which has 105 km of its route.
- February 1998 - At 1998 Indian general election, North Goa elected Ravi Naik of INC and South Goa elected Francisco Sardinha of INC.
- October 1998 - Naval Aviation Museum is established at Bogmalo. It is the only Naval Aviation Museum in Asia.
- 1998 – Second Mandovi Bridge completed.
- 1998- Shri Kamaxshi Devi Homeopathic Medical College is set up at Shiroda, Goa and is the first Homeopathic college in Goa.
- 1998–99 - The first Goa Professional League was launched and Salgaocar F.C. clinched the title.
- March 1999 – Salgaocar F.C. became the first Goan side to win both the National Football League and Durand Cup in 1998–99.
- 6 June 1999 – 1999 Goa Legislative Assembly election. The Congress (I) party won an outright majority with 21. 10 BJP, 4 MGP, 2 UGDP, 2 Goa Rajiv Congress Party and 1 independent were also elected. Chief Minister Luizinho Faleiro was sworn in on 9 June—ending four months of President's Rule for the state.
- 1999 - Eduardo Faleiro of INC was elected as the Rajya Sabha MP from Goa.
- October 1999 - At 1999 Indian general election, North Goa elected Shripad Yesso Naik of Bharatiya Janata Party and South Goa elected Ramakant Angle of BJP.
- 24 November 1999 - Francisco Sardinha became the 9th Chief Minister after he broke away from Congress and formed Goa People's Congress and led the coalition government for 334 days.
- December 1999 - Goa Marriott Resort is opened at Panjim. It is the first of Marriott Hotels & Resorts in India.
- 1999 - MV Caravela (now Deltin Caravela) became the first off-shore casino in Mandovi River.

=== 2000s ===
- 16 January 2000 – The Archdiocese of Goa and Daman received its first Patron, St. Joseph Vaz. He is also known as the Apostle of Canara and Sri Lanka. It was in Sri Lanka that he exercised his outstanding missionary work, having died there in 1711.
- 5 March 2000 - Goa State Legislative Assembly Complex, (Porvorim) was inaugurated by Prime Minister Atal Bihari Vajpayee.
- 5 June 2000 – MV River Princess drifted and got grounded near Candolim coast.
- 8 June 2000 - St. Andrew's Church, Vasco was bombed as part of the series of church bombings in south India. Police and investigating authorities blamed the Islamist extremist group Deendar Anjuman. But in 2009, the accused were acquitted.
- 20 August 2000 - 1st World Goa Day was celebrated on the occasion of inclusion of Konkani in the Eighth Schedule to the Constitution of India as per the Seventy-First Amendment on 20 August 1992.
- 24 October 2000 - BJP's Manohar Parrikar becomes the 10th Chief Minister with the help of rebel Congress MLAs.
- 2000 - Anil Kakodkar, son of Purushottam Kakodkar, took the charge of Chairman of Atomic Energy Commission of India. In May 2010, he became the first recipient of the Gomant Vibhushan Award, Goa's highest civilian award.
- 2000 - The construction of Salaulim Dam was completed. It now serves Sanguem, Quepem and Salcette.
- March 2001 - Lata Mangeshkar was awarded Bharat Ratna, India's highest civilian award thereby becoming the first Goan origin person to win the award.
- June 2002 - BJP won 17 seats of 2002 Goa Legislative Assembly election. Congress got 16, UGDP 3, MGP 2, Nationalist Congress Party 1 and 1 independent. Manohar Parrikar was sworn in as the Chief Minister of the BJP led coalition.
- August 2002 - The City Of Panaji Corporation Bill was passed which upgraded Panaji Municipal Council into a corporation.
- 1 October 2002 – A collision between two IL-38 naval reconnaissance aircraft over Goa near Dabolim Airport killed 12 naval personnel and five people on the ground in India's worst military air accident. Goa is home to the Indian Navy's aviation wing, and has also been witness to a number of crashes by the Sea Harrier aircraft.
- January 2003 - Park Hyatt Goa is established in Cansaulim. It became the first Park Hyatt in India. Later ITC Limited acquired it and renamed it to ITC Grand Goa.
- 17 April 2003 - Prashil Varde, a marine engineer who had returned from Hong Kong tests SARS positive and became the first Indian to get infected of it. He was later cured and was discharged from Goa Medical College and Hospital.
- 12 December 2003 – Filipe Neri Ferrão is appointed as the Archbishop of Roman Catholic Archdiocese of Goa and Daman by Pope John Paul II, after the resignation of Archbishop Raul Nicolau Gonçalves.
- 9 January 2004 - Fitz Remedios Santana de Souza, a Kenyan lawyer was conferred with Pravasi Bharatiya Samman and became the first Goan to be conferred with the honour.
- 2004-Birla Institute of Technology and Science, Pilani, an autonomous Deemed university which focuses primarily on higher education and research in engineering and sciences establishes its campus at Zuari Nagar, Goa.
- 23 July 2004 - The Bourne Supremacy is released. Its opening scenes were shot at Palolem, Panjim and Candolim.
- May 2004 - At 2004 Indian general election, North Goa elected Shripad Yesso Naik of BJP and South Goa elected Churchill Alemao of INC.
- July 2004 - Ashvek Vintage World was set up at Nuvem. It is Goa's only vintage car museum.
- 15 September 2004 - First trial run of Margao Skybus Metro was conducted. Later, on 24 September during its run it met with an accident which led to one death and 2 injured. The project was a failure and the structure was dismantled in 2013.
- 29 November 2004 – 35th International Film Festival of India (IFFI) held in Goa, from 29 November to 9 December. This is the first time that Goa is hosting the event, which used to be traditionally hosted in New Delhi.
- 2004 - Alessha, a Konkani film directed by Rajendra Talak. It won the National Award for Best Feature Film in Konkani at the 52nd National Film Awards. Aleesha was the first film to win this award.
- 28 February 2005 – Fall of the Goa government of the Bharatiya Janata Party, which has been in power since 2000 end (and ruled through proxy for a year prior to that).. A complex parliamentary power struggle in the western state of Goa culminated on 28 February with the resignation both of Bharatiya Janata Party (BJP)-elected Speaker of the state assembly Vishwas Satarkar and his deputy, preventing the holding of a vote of confidence in the administration headed by Pratapsingh Rane of the Congress party. The crisis began in late January after the United Goans Democratic Party—Secular-Mickky (UGDP) merged with the ruling BJP, enlarging the latter's majority in the assembly. However, after chief minister Manohar Parrikar then dismissed one of his ministers, while four BJP legislators resigned from the party and the assembly, extending their support to Congress. But a determined chief minister Parrikar refused to give up office, claiming he still enjoyed the majority. After further defections and arcane procedural manoeuvres, (the Congress-appointed) State Governor S.C. Jamir on 2 February dismissed Parrikar's government and installed Rane as chief minister, even though the former had claimed to have technically won a confidence vote. On appointing Rane, Jamir asked him to prove his majority through a confidence vote within a month, leading to allegations of bias by the ousted BJP.
- 4 March 2005 – President APJ Abdul Kalam in New Delhi approved the imposition of President's Rule in Goa after the Congress chief minister Pratapsingh Rane won a controversial confidence vote earlier in the day solely by enlisting the support of the assembly Speaker whilst also preventing a BJP member from voting.
- 7 June 2005 – Veteran Congress (I) politician Pratapsinh Rane (also spelt as Pratapsingh Rane) was sworn in as chief minister of the western state of Goa, after Congress and its allies on 5 June won four out of five by-elections to state assembly seats, giving them a majority in the 39-member assembly with a total of 21 seats. This brought to an end President's Rule imposed in March to resolve a political crisis. The fact that the Congress was also in power in New Delhi, and that its nominee was in power in the decisive Governor's office, was not inconsequential. As of 2020, Pratap Singh Rane is the longest serving (15 years and 250 days) CM of Goa.
- 2005 - Shantaram Naik of INC was elected as the Rajya Sabha MP from Goa.
- March 2006 - Curchorem-Sanvordem communal riots took place on 3 and 4 March following the damage to a Muslim prayer house at Guddemol-Curchorem on 1 March. During the two days, protestors clashed with the police and a number of people, including policemen, were injured in the riots. It continued till Central Industrial Security Force stepped in. Nearly 50 vehicles and over 30 houses and shops, mostly owned by the Muslim community, were also damaged in the process. 40 accused were acquitted in 2012 due to lack of evidence.
- 25 November 2006 - Pope Benedict XVI with Cum Christi Evangelii made the Diocese of Sindhudurg, a suffragan of Goa and Daman, together with which it formed a new ecclesiastical province.
- 2006 - Ravindra Kelekar was awarded Jnanpith Award, highest literary honour in India, for his "outstanding contribution towards literature" in Konkani.
- 2006 - 1st AstroTurf stadium of Goa, Chowgule Sports Centre of Parvatibai Chowgule College was opened.
- November 2007 - Francisco Sardinha of INC was elected from South Goa by-election of the 14th Lok Sabha.
- June 2007 - 2007 Goa Legislative Assembly election. INC (16) in alliance with NCP (3) and Save Goa Front (2) formed the government. 14 BJP, 2 MGP, 2 independents and UGDP formed opposition. Digambar Kamat was appointed as the 11th Chief Minister of Goa.
- 25 November 2007 - Alvito D'Cunha of East Bengal became the first Indian goalscorer of I-League.
- 28,29 December 2007 - Sunburn Festival held its first edition at Candolim Beach with Carl Cox, Above & Beyond and Axwell as headline acts.
- 4–7 February 2008 - The Government of Goa instituted the annual "Damodar Dharmananda Kosambi Festival of Ideas" to commemorate his birth centenary. The speakers included Hamid Ansari (Vice President of India), Prof Romila Thapar, Meera Kosambi (Daughter of D. D. Kosambi), P. Sainath and Dr.Vivek Monteiro.
- 2008 - Dempo S.C. won the inaugural edition of I-League.
- 1 May 2008 - Swapnil Asnodkar becomes first Goan to make debut in IPL by representing Rajasthan Royals.
- 5 July 2008 - Wax World Museum was inaugurated at Old Goa.
- September 2008 - 108 ambulance service of GVK EMRI was launched with 13 ambulances in Goa.
- 20 April 2009 - Mahanand Naik (Dupatta Killer), the serial killer who is now accused of having killed 18 women was arrested. He has been acquitted in many of them but was convicted for 3 murders.
- May 2009 - At 2009 Indian general election, North Goa elected Shripad Yesso Naik of BJP and South Goa elected Francisco Sardinha of INC.
- August 2009 - Goa Broad Band Network is launched.
- September 2009 - A 28-year-old woman from Canacona became the first Goan fatality of Swine flu in Goa.
- 2009 - Cashew feni was awarded Geographical indication registration as a speciality alcoholic beverage. It is the first product of Goa to receive GI tag.

=== 2010s ===
- 10 June 2010 - Basilica of Bom Jesus is announced as one of the Seven Wonders of Portuguese Origin in the World.
- 2010- National Institute of Technology Goa (also known as NIT Goa or NITG) is set up at Farmagudi, Goa. It is one of the 31 National Institutes of Technology in India.
- 14 March 2011 - The first shopping mall of Goa, Caculo Mall opens in Panjim.
- 18–23 August 2011 - Goa hosted the relics of John Bosco at Panjim, Vasco and Margao as part of the world itinerary.
- 2011 - Shantaram Naik of INC was re-elected as the Rajya Sabha MP from Goa.
- 6 October 2011 - The fifth Chief Minister of Goa, Luis Proto Barbosa dies.
- 18 February 2012 - Six including 4 children drowned due to school bus accident at Carona, Aldona ferry point.
- March 2012 - 2012 Goa Legislative Assembly election. The Bharatiya Janata Party (21)-Maharashtrawadi Gomantak (3) alliance defeated the incumbent Indian National Congress (9) government with 24 seats. Goa Vikas Party claimed 2 seats and 5 independents emerged victorious. Manohar Parrikar is appointed as the Chief Minister of Goa. 82.94% poll percentage of this election is the highest ever in Goan assembly election history. In a first, both husband (Atanasio Monserrate) and Wife (Jennifer Monserrate) were elected to the Goa legislative assembly.
- March 2012 - Football is declared as the official state sport of Goa.
- 4 April 2012 - Dharbandora taluka was formed as 12th taluka of Goa by bifurcating Sanguem.
- July 2012 – Western Ghats is declared as a natural UNESCO World Heritage Site at the 36th annual session of the World Heritage Committee held in Russia.
- 5 October 2012 - The Supreme Court banned all mining operations, in all 90 mines including transportation of mined iron ore and manganese in leases of Goa. Goa Foundation played a clinical role in this case. The ban was uplifted partially in April 2014 and was again stopped after a few years.
- 31 October 2013 - More than 150 West Africans mostly Nigerians living in Parra, blockaded highway at Porvorim after damaging a police hearse van carrying the body of a murdered Nigerian. The situation was diffused and later 53 of them were detained.
- 4 January 2014 - An underconstruction 5 storey building collapsed in Chaudi, Canacona killing more than 31 people.
- 18–29 January 2014 – Goa hosted the 3rd edition of Lusofonia Games.12 nations participated; all except Equatorial Guinea secured at least one medal. Six different venues were used for conducting 95 events in 9 sports.
- May 2014 - At 2014 Indian general election, North Goa elected Shripad Yesso Naik of BJP and South Goa elected Narendra Keshav Sawaikar of BJP. The voter turnout of 77.06% in Goa is the highest ever in a parliamentary election.
- August 2014 - Parvatibai Chowgule College, is granted autonomy and it becomes the first autonomous college in Goa.
- 23 October 2014 - Cavin Lobo of ATK became the first Goan to score in Indian Super League and managed to stage a comeback for ATK from being 1–0 to 1–2 against FC Goa.
- 8 November 2014 - Manohar Parrikar resigns as Chief Minister to take the charge of Defence Minister of India and Laxmikant Parsekar is sworn in as the 12th Chief Minister of Goa.
- 22 November 2014 – 3 January 2015 - The 17th and the most recent exposition of the sacred relic of St Francis Xavier took place in Se Cathedral.
- December 2014 - The Second Planet Hollywood Resort of the world, Planet Hollywood Goa opens at Utorda beach.
- 9 April 2015 - 1st World Konkani Day was celebrated in legacy of Shenoi Goembab's death anniversary.
- 3 May 2015 - Nachom-ia Kumpasar is released. It has won 24 international, 3 national and 10 state awards making it the most awarded Konkani film. It became the most expensive film ever made in Konkani. Also it is the highest grossing Konkani film of all time.
- 30 May 2015 - Central Jail, Colvale is established.
- 4 September 2015 - The seventh Chief Minister and the oldest (71) serving CM of Goa, Wilfred de Souza dies.
- 2015 - Francis Newton Souza's painting "Birth" was sold for $4million at Christie's, New York. It created a record for the most expensive Indian painting sold. Later the record was broken by Vasudeo S. Gaitonde, his fellow Goan-origin painter.
- 7 January 2016 - Stripped Grey Mullet, locally known as "Shevtto" is declared as the official state fish of Goa.
- 28–31 March 2016 - Goa hosted the 9th edition of Defence Exposition at Quitol, Quepem.
- 2 May 2016 - Mario Miranda was honoured by Google with a Google Doodle on his 90th birth anniversary. It was doodled by Aaron Renier.
- 24 May 2016 - Panaji is selected under Smart Cities Mission by Government of India.
- July 2016 - Indian Institute of Technology Goa, started functioning from a temporary campus housed at Goa Engineering College (GEC) Campus located at Farmagudi, Goa. IIT Goa is one of the 23 Indian Institutes of Technology in India.
- 15 September-2 October 2016 - Goa hosted 2016 AFC U-16 Championship at Fatorda Stadium and Bambolim Stadium. Iraq won the tournament by defeating Iran 4–3 on Penalties.
- 15,16 October 2016 -8th BRICS summit, an international conference of the heads of countries of Brazil, Russia, India, China and South Africa, was held in Goa at Taj Exotica, Benaulim. Brazil won the First BRICS under-17 World Cup.
- 28 October 2016 - The second Chief Minister, the only woman CM and the youngest (38) serving CM of Goa, Shashikala Kakodkar dies.
- November 2016 - W Goa of Marriott International opens at Vagator. It is the first W Hotel in India.
- 28 January 2017 - First edition of TEDxPanaji, an independent event similar to TED was organised at Goa University. #AnswersWithin was its theme. The speakers for the event were Dr Abhijit Nadkarni, Dr Amit Dias, Dr Rajendra Kerkar, Hyacinth Pinto, Isabel de Santa Rita Vás, Jason Fernandes, Mohammad Shaikh, Richard Dias, Samruddhi Kerkar and Victor Hugo Gomes.
- 12 January 2017 - The first and only woman MP from Goa, Sanyogita Rane dies.
- February 2017 - 2017 Goa Legislative Assembly election. BJP (13 MLA) managed to secure an alliance with 3 MGP, 3 Goa Forward Party and 3 independent MLAs and formed the government on 14 March 2017. For the first time in Goan history, the incumbent CM (Parsekar) lost his seat in assembly election.
- 2017 - Vinay Tendulkar of BJP was elected as the Rajya Sabha MP from Goa.
- 7–21 October 2017 - India hosted 2017 FIFA U-17 World Cup and Fatorda Stadium was one of the six venues. It hosted all but one Group C (Iran, Germany, Guinea, Costa Rica) games and a Group D game of Brazil and Niger. Later two Round of 16 games and a Quarter-final were played here.
- 8 February 2018 - Goa bagged a haul of 8 medals (1 Gold, 5 Silver, 2 Bronze) at the first Khelo India School Games.
- July 2018 - Kala Academy's College of Theatre Arts is established.
- 30 October – 3 November 2018 - Goa hosted the JCI World Congress.
- 2018 - Goa Challengers made its debut in the second season of Ultimate Table Tennis.
- 28 January 2019 - India's first GI Store opens at Dabolim Airport.
- 5 February 2019 - Atal Setu (also known as the Third Mandovi Bridge or Atal Bridge) is declared open.
- 17 March 2019 - Manohar Parrikar dies in office and Pramod Sawant replaces him as the 13th Chief Minister on 19 March 2019.
- 27 March – 1 April 2019 - 10th Rector Major of the Salesians, Ángel Fernández Artime visits Goa.
- May 2019 - At 2019 Indian general election, North Goa elected Shripad Yesso Naik of BJP and South Goa elected Francisco Sardinha of INC.
- 3 July 2019 - Prudent Media Goa became the first Goan channel to cross 100,000 Subscribers on YouTube.

=== 2020s ===
- January 2020 - Four Tiger carcasses were found. They were poisoned by the villagers of Golauli, Sattari. Five locals had been arrested but were later released on bail.
- 13 February 2020 - Goa entered the 2019–20 Ranji Trophy quarterfinals after topping the 2019–20 Ranji Trophy Plate Group. This is Goa's best ever finish in the Ranji Trophy.
- 19 February 2020 - FC Goa topped the ISL league stage and won the first ever ISL League Winners Shield and also became the first-ever Indian club to qualify for the AFC Champions League group stage.
- 22 March 2020 - Goa went into lockdown after government of India announced Janata Curfew. Goa extended it further by two days and later 21 days nationwide lockdown followed.
- 25 March 2020 - 53-year-old hailing from Guirdolim, became the first Goan to die of COVID-19 in Hounston, United Kingdom.
- 1 June 2020 - Mangor Hill, Mormugao is declared as a Containment-zone after two of its residents test positive.
- 22 June 2020 - Goa reported its first COVID-19 death of an 85-year-old from Morlem, Sattari.
- 1 June 2020 – 30 September 2020 - Goa witnessed the highest annual seasonal rainfall of 4,203.7mm (420 cm or 165.5 inches) in its recorded history. The previous record of 408 cm in 1961 was broken.
- 12 September 2022 - Eight of the 11 Congress MLAs in the Goa Assembly defected to the Bharatiya Janata Party including former CM Digambar Kamat
- October 2023 - Goan Cashew got GI Indication

July 24, 2023 - Goa High Court Orders Tiger Reserve in Mhadei Wildlife Sanctuary

- 6 April 2024 - Congress announced Adv.Ramakant Khalap and Capt.Viriato Fernandes as North and South Goa Lok Sabha Candidate respectively.Former Minister Alina Saldanha joined Congress.
- 7 May 2024 - The voting for third phase of Lok Sabha election was held in Goa.
- 4 June 2024 - Lok Sabha Election results declared BJP'sShripad Naik and Congress's Captain Viriato Fernandes elected MP of North Goa and South Goa respectively.

== See also ==
- History of Goa
- Timeline of Indian history
