= Shree Navdurga Devasthan =

Shree Navdurga Devasthan may refer to:

- Navdurga Temple, Madkai
- Navdurga Temple, Kundaim
