= Anti-Nylon 6,6 movement =

Socio-ecological movement in Goa, India

- Date: Late 1980s–January 1995
- Location: Keri, Ponda, Goa, India; 15°27′39.69″N 74°0′47.21″E
- Caused by: Proposal to set up Nylon 6,6 manufacturing plant without considering ecological consequences
- Goals: Opposition of Nylon 6,6 manufacturing plant
- Methods: Civil disobedience, demonstrations, Dharna, Gherao, Hartal, vandalism, arson
- Result: Relocation of the project out of Goa

Parties
Thapar DuPont Limited; Government of Goa	Goan people

Lead figures
Then Chief Minister of Goa, Pratapsingh Rane	

Casualties and losses
	3

Casualties
- Death: 1 (Nilesh Naik)
- Injuries: 2
- Damage: TDL factory damaged by protestors

The Anti-Nylon 6,6 movement was a significant environmental and social protest in Goa, India, during the late 1980s and early 1990s, against a proposed chemical plant by Thapar Du Pont Limited (TDL). A joint venture between the American multinational DuPont and the Indian conglomerate Thapar Group, TDL planned to manufacture Nylon 6,6 on a plateau in Querim, Ponda taluka. The movement ended in January 1995 after intense civilian clashes, police firing, the death of Nilesh Naik and the eventual relocation of the project out of Goa.

== Project proposal ==
In 1983, the Goa Economic Development Corporation (EDC) applied for a Letter of intent (LOI) from the Government of India to set up a Nylon 6,6 manufacturing facility. TDL planned to import raw materials like adipic acid from Singapore and hexamethylenediamine (HMD) from Texas via sea to a site located on a plateau in Querim village. The EDC did not disclose in its LOI application that these chemicals were hazardous.

The EDC received the LOI in 1985. However, the initial application did not specify that the manufacturing process would discharge air pollutants, solid waste, and contaminated liquid effluents, potentially affecting the ecology within a radius of 25 km (16 mi). Further, despite claims that no environmental sanctuaries or national monuments were nearby, several notified heritage structures existed within the zone, some even as close as 5 km (3.1 mi).

== Environmental concerns ==
=== Regulatory evaluations ===
Local planning authorities opposed the proposed site. On 20 November 1985, the Chief Town Planner rejected the location, noting that Ponda taluka already contained five existing or proposed industrial zones. The planner highlighted that since the Querim plateau is situated at an elevation above 150 metres (490 ft), constructing a chemical plant on the plateau would severely disrupt groundwater reserves, local sweet water channels, and the surrounding orchard lands, including areca nut plantations. In April 1987, the State Director of Industries also denied approval, citing the highly polluting classification of the industry, as stated by the Central Government. In his statement, the director argued that the 500 acres (2,000,000 m^{2}) land required could instead accommodate hundreds of smaller, cleaner industries, providing widespread employment.

=== Local opposition ===
Local opposition was further driven by concerns over the region's hydrogeology. The Querim plateau consists of porous laterite rock that acts as a catchment area, feeding numerous vital fresh-water springs (known locally as zors), including Shikretalem Zor, Shitolem Zor, Zarovnem Zor, and Dabavorchi Zor. These springs supply drinking and agricultural water to multiple villages such as Savoi-Verem, Khandola, Priol, Veling, and Madkai. Residents feared that industrial emissions and blasting operations would destroy these water sources. Public skepticism was reinforced by previous environmental issues associated with a Thapar-owned factory in Karwar involving mercury and chlorine contamination.

== Regulatory bypasses ==
=== Government overruling ===
In June 1988, then Chief Minister of Goa Pratapsingh Rane called for a special meeting to discuss the project, despite the objections raised by the Chief Town Planner, and subsequent land-use modifications were approved despite public protests. However, Rane had himself initially opposed the project.

In 1990, the Goa Legislative Assembly formed a House Committee to investigate the controversy, leading to a temporary stay on the work for nearly two and a half years. The final report of the committee deemed the site entirely unsuitable and recommended dismissing the proposal. This recommendation was bypassed by the government, which signed a 90-year land lease with TDL in November 1993, granting them over 123 hectares (1,230,000 m^{2}) of land.

=== Missing environmental clearances ===
TDL obtained general No Objection Certificates (NOCs) from the Central Water Pollution Control Board and the State Pollution Control Board (SPCB). However, the SPCB Technical Advisory Committee later stated the clearance was limited to civil works and that no detailed analysis of the specific Nylon 6,6 technology had been conducted, as no such plant existed in Asia at the time.

In January 1994, the Ministry of Environment and Forests mandated prior environmental clearance for specific large-scale projects, including Nylon 6,6 production, under the Environment Protection Act, 1986. Neither the EDC nor TDL had secured this mandatory clearance.

=== Internal corporate disputes ===
An internal corporate email from October 1994 revealed that DuPont and TDL had unresolved disputes regarding the funding of a US$100,000 (equivalent to $217,220 in 2025) environmental safety study requested by consultants.

== Protests ==
After obtaining the lease in November 1993, TDL began construction by starting with a peripheral compound wall in June 1994. This was done without obtaining the mandatory authorization from the local village Panchayat, prompting a show cause notice. TDL used explosives during this construction that damaged nearby residential houses, upsetting the villagers.

The local population organized intense village meetings and large-scale rallies. On 7 October 1994, a gathering of villagers prevented corporate officials from laying the factory's foundation stone, forcing workers and an official helicopter to retreat. The protestors blocked access roads by digging trenches and piling rubble. Later, on 12 October, a crowd of more than 2,000 people entered the site, demolished constructed buildings and the compound wall, and burnt heavy machinery, including two hydraulic excavators. The damage was estimated to be more than ₹1 crore (equivalent to ₹6.6 crore or US$680,000 in 2023).

In response, the police arrested Dattaram Desai, a doctor and the convener of the Anti-Nylon Citizens Committee, along with seven associates. The police then faced severe criticism for allegedly humiliating the detainees by stripping off their clothes and forcing them to fill the road trenches.

== Police shootout ==
On 23 January 1995, a delegation of American corporate officials attempted to inspect the Querim site but was blocked by a civilian blockade composed largely of women and children. The officials bypassed the protestors to meet with the Chief Minister in Panaji. Later that evening, armed police personnel opened fire on the protestors at the blockade. Two women sustained gunshot wounds, and when a local youth, Nilesh Naik, tried to intervene, he was shot at point-blank range and died from his injuries.

The shooting triggered widespread unrest. Confrontations led to the retreat of police forces, the capture of several officers, and the destruction of three government vehicles and a police bus. The town of Ponda was placed under a complete shutdown, and local agitators later raided and burned the TDL administrative office in Ponda, destroying hundreds of corporate files.

Following the violence, the Querim village Panchayat passed a unanimous resolution under the Goa Panchayat Raj Act, 1993, to reject all future applications from TDL. The media later published when correspondence indicating that TDL had made a donation of ₹25,000 (equivalent to ₹160,000 or US$1,700 in 2023) to a Public Works Department (PWD) private function in exchange for an increase in the factory's daily water allocation from 2.5 million to 5 million litres.

== Aftermath ==
Confronted by absolute local resistance and legal challenges filed in the Bombay High Court, TDL abandoned the Querim site. DuPont subsequently announced the relocation of the proposed factory to Tamil Nadu. However, the company was unable to establish the Nylon 6,6 plant there as well, transitioning instead to an alternative product before eventually selling its corporate stake to Sriram and withdrawing the project from India entirely.
