= Navdurga Temple, Kundaim =

Hindu temple in Kundaim, Goa, India

Coordinates: 15°26′47″N 73°57′27″E

The Navdurga Temple is a notable Hindu temple located in Kundaim, Goa, India. Dedicated to the goddess Navdurga, it was set up after separating from the Navdurga Temple, Madkai.

== History ==
=== Origin and migration ===
Due to a growing population of Gaud Saraswat Brahmins (GSBs), several GSB families originally residing in Verna village within the Sashti (Salcete) province moved to establish a new settlement in Ganshi, located in Tiswadi. This was supported by the local Gauda community. In Ganshi, the settlers consecrated an image of their patron deity (Ishtadevata), Goddess Navdurga, and permanently established their residency.

In subsequent generations, certain members of the GSB community migrated further into the Antruz Mahal area, founding the villages of Madkai and Kundaim. During the era of Portuguese colonial rule, a period marked by forced religious conversions, the Hindu inhabitants of the village chose to relocate their revered deity to Madkai to preserve it. The idol was initially housed in a locality known as 'Talyakhol' within the Parampay ward of Madkai.

=== Consecration in Kundaim ===
Internal disputes arose within the joint village administration (Gramasanstha) governing Madkai and Kundaim, resulting in the formation of two distinct, independent village bodies. Following this division, the residents of Kundaim commissioned a separate replica of Goddess Navdurga and installed it in the Dasol ward of Kundaim. This historical split led to the coexistence of two separate Navdurga temples across both administrative areas.

== Architecture and design ==
The second principal shrine is located at the base of a hill in the Dasol ward of Kundaim, where Kundaim villagers established a temple and consecrated Goddess Navdurga. For the Kundaim residents, Goddess Navdurga is revered as their Gramadevata (village deity), while their mool daivata (original deity/deities) are treated as her parivardevata (family/attendant deities).

=== Associated shrines ===
Several parivardevata shrines are located around the main temple complex in Kundaim, including those dedicated to Mahadev, Ganapati, Adinayan, and Grampurush.

In the Kundaim bazaar, there is a temple to Mallikarjun, featuring two distinct images of Kshetrapala on either side. Also present in Kundaim are independent temples for Shree Narayan and Shree Shivipurush; Shivipurush is traditionally considered the ancestor of the Navdurga deity's Mahajans. A short distance from the Navdurga temple is the Guruvsay ward, predominantly a settlement of the Gurav people. In this area are the temples of Shree Betal and his associate deities, including Raikhadi (Ratavelo Samand) and Kanandaya Purush. Further from the Betal temple is the shrine of Ravalnath, and to its right are temples for Bhutnath and Shantari. Nearby, another shrine houses Lakshmi, also identified as "Papani Lakshmi."

=== Restorations ===
The Kundaim temple underwent a major restoration (Jirnodhar) in the year Shaka 1832 (approximately 1910 AD), with its formal inauguration (Uktavan Suvalo) and the consecration of a new idol occurring in 1913. Every year on Vaishakh Shukla 10, a commemorative festival called Smarkotsav is celebrated to mark this event, featuring programs like Vasant Puja and a grand procession. Like in Madkai, a nightly palanquin festival (Shibikotsav) is observed at this shrine.

=== Festivals and rituals ===
The annual festival (Jatra) in Kundaim was historically held during the waning half (Vadya Paksha) of Kartik, but it was subsequently moved and is now observed from Margashirsha Shukla Navami to Margashirsha Shukla Chaturdashi. Associated with the older Kartik Jatra on the night of Trayodashi was a ritual called "Rat Ghundvopachi Birankul," which involved spinning multiple participants (typically two to three people) suspended from a tall wooden pole on a wheel-like device. This practice, believed to be divinely sanctioned, was abandoned after a suspension cord broke during a ritual, and the cessation was later enforced by the Portuguese administration.

The unique prasad distributed at the Kundaim shrine consists of cooked raw rice (ukde tandul) mixed with lime, presented along with a traditional prayer.

== Patrons ==
The original patrons (Mahajans) of the Kundaim temple belong to the Smarti Sampraday of the Gaud Saraswat Brahmin community who are part of the Kundaim Gramasanstha. They are organized into six distinct clans (Vangdis), listed below with their associated gotras:

Vangdis and gotras in Kundaim
Vangdi (Clan / Family Surnames)	Gotra
Akasarkar Kamat	Garga
Shenvi Mavjikar	Kaundinya
Garderkar Kamat	Garga
Ambolkar Kamat	Garga
Dabolkar Kamat	Garga
Kulkarni, Sisani	Kaushik

The devotee base of the Kundaim temple also includes individuals from various other communities besides the GSB Mahajans, such as Daivajna Brahmin, Gurav, Bhagat, Vaishya, Lohar, Twashta Kansar, Gavda, and Harijan.
