= Madkai =

Town in Goa, India

Marcaim Madkai
- Village
- Location in Goa, India Marcaim (India)
- Coordinates: 15.4230481°N 73.9511311°E
- Country: India
- State: Goa
- District: North Goa

Population (2011)
  - Total: 6,215
- Demonym: Indian

Languages
  - Official: Konkani
- Time zone: UTC+5:30 (IST)
- PIN: 403404
- Vehicle registration: GA
- Website: goa.gov.in

Marcaim or Madkai is a census town in Ponda taluka, North Goa district in the state of Goa, India. Historians have identified it with Madiyagombu, a place named on a hero stone of 1380.

The town is home to the Navdurga temple. Since 2016 the temple's mahajans and a trust of villagers have been in a court dispute over its idol.

== Population ==
The 2011 census recorded 6,215 people in Marcaim: 3,143 males and 3,072 females, a sex ratio of 977 females per 1,000 males. Children aged six or under numbered 523, or 8.4% of the population.

Scheduled Tribes made up 36.23% of the population and Scheduled Castes 0.37%.

== Religion ==
Hindus made up 96.46% of the population, Christians 2.91% and Muslims 0.45%.

== History ==
=== Battle of Madkai ===
A 1380 hero stone (viragal) records a battle at Madiyagombu, which the historians Varde Valaulikar and Henry Heras took to be Madkai. On that reading, the fighting was between Mallapodeyar, the Vijayanagara governor of Kanara, and an alliance of Goan chieftains under the Kadambas, whom Vijayanagara records call the konkaniga.

The historian Tensing Rodrigues argues that the Nayak family, who were then probably the desais of the Antruz mahal, fought on the Vijayanagara side rather than with the local alliance. His reasoning is that soon afterwards Nagan Nayak was made sardesai of South Goa, with rights over Supe, Khanapur and Chandgad. The family's ruined fort on Madkai hill, one of its strongholds, is known locally as Desayancho Buruz.

== Government and politics ==
Marcaim is part of the Marcaim assembly constituency, which falls within the South Goa Lok Sabha constituency.

== Climate ==
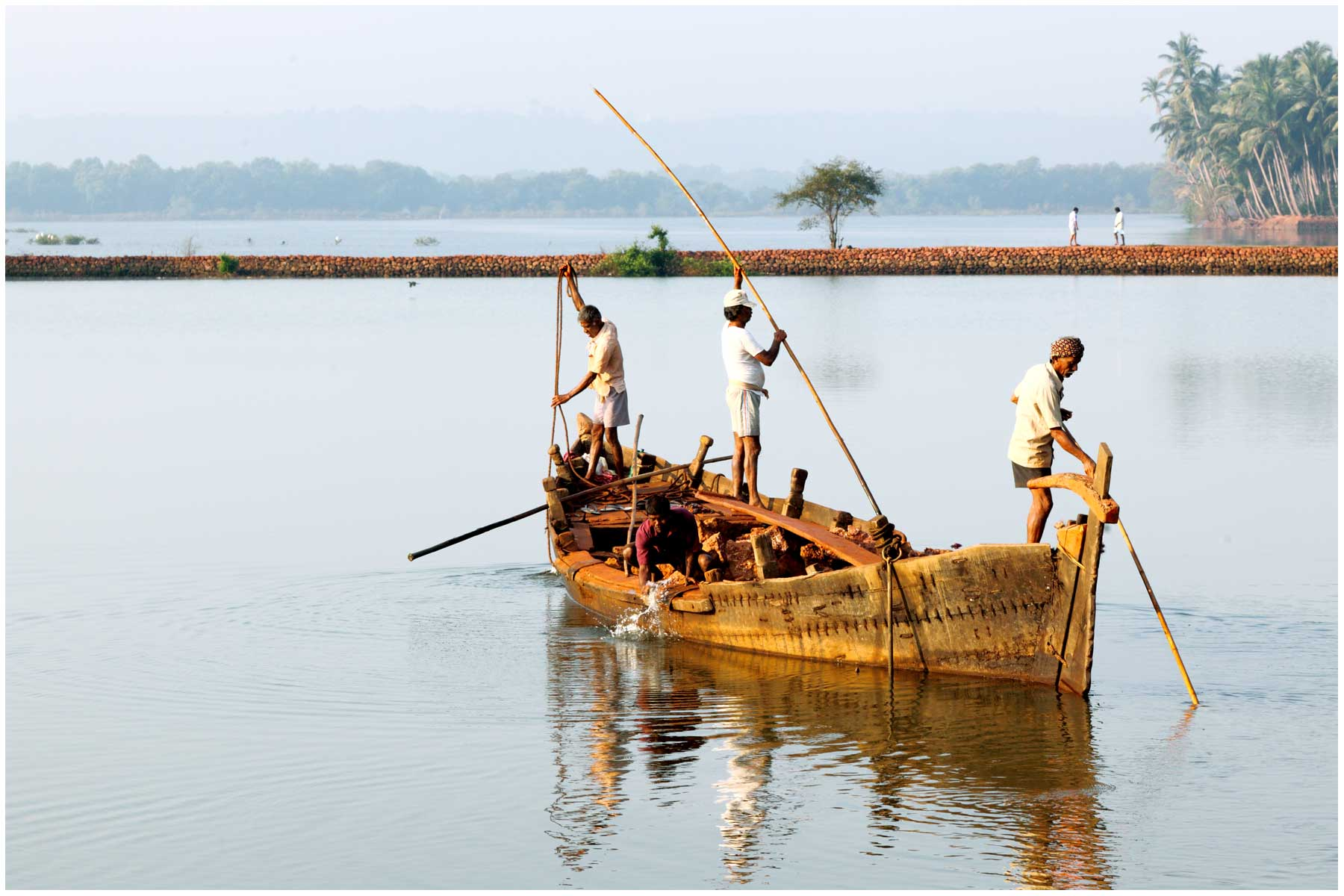
Madkai village

The 2011 census town directory gives Marcaim an annual rainfall of 3,630.42 mm, with temperatures ranging between 23.51 °C and 31.53 °C.

== Economy ==
In 2011, 2,597 people (41.8% of the population) were working. Of these workers, 109 (4.2%) were agricultural labourers and 69 (2.7%) were cultivators.

Marcaim has an industrial estate. The census lists steel, pharmaceutical products and household utensils as the main goods manufactured in the town.

In January 2024 farmers at a convention in Madkai asked for Goa's tenancy and Mundkar laws to be amended, so that people claiming to own land would have to prove it with documents rather than with the "1/14" land record alone.

== Institutions ==
Approximate number of educational institutions per 10,000 people, 2011:

Primary	Middle	Secondary / matriculation	Senior secondary	College
13	3	3	2	0
