= Deendar Anjuman =

Islamic fundamentalist group

- Formation: 1924
- Founder: Siddique Hussain
- Type: Religious
- Purpose: Religious studies
- Headquarters: Asif Nagar, Hyderabad, India
- Region served: India, Saudi Arabia & Pakistan
- President: Fuqra-E-Deendar Anjuman
- Affiliations: Sufism
- Website: www.deendar.org/introduction.html
- Remarks: Designated as a Terrorist organisation by India

Deendar Anjuman is a Sufi Islamic fundamentalist Sect founded in Hyderabad, India. The group was banned in India in 2000, due to its involvement in series of church bombings in India.

== History ==
The Deendar Anjuman was founded in 1924 by the Hazrat Moulana Deendar Channabasaveshwara Siddiqui (also known as Syed Siddique Hussain) in Hyderabad State under the patronage of Nizam Mir Osman Ali Khan. The organization was founded at the time when religious tensions were at all time high in British Raj and multiple Islamic revivalist movements were being founded. Siddique claimed to be the reincarnation of Channabasavanna, a Hindu Lingayat saint from 12th century.

The main motive of this sect was to convert local Hindu Lingayats to Islam, as in to counter the Arya Samaji Suddhi movement of Northern India. After the Annexation of Hyderabad in 1948, the top leadership and most of its followers migrated to Pakistan.

== Ban ==
Deendar Anjuman was banned in May 2001. The group's founder Siddique is reported to have hated the British colonial government, which in 1934 jailed Siddiqui and 18 of his followers for indulging in inflammatory speeches and writings. In October 2007 the ban was extended and the group declared an unlawful. for "indulging in activities which are pre-judicial to the security of the country having the potential to disturb peace and communal harmony and to disrupt the secular fabric of the country".

In 2008, capital punishment was awarded to 11 people and life sentence to 12 others by a local court. The prime accused in the case, Zia-ul-Hassan was the son of Syed Siddique Hussain, the founder of Deendar Anjuman. Zia-ul-Hassan had migrated to Pakistan and used to visit Hyderabad during his father's death anniversary. Deendar Channabasaveshwara Anjuman, founded in the 1920s. The conspiracy was hatched in October 1999 in Hyderabad, during the death anniversary of its founder Hajrath Moulana Siddiqui.

== See also ==
- Darsgah-Jihad-O-Shahadat
