= Dipaji Rane =

Goan warrior

Dipaji Rane was a Goan warrior who led a major three-and-a-half-year revolt against Portuguese colonial rule in Goa starting in 1852.

== Background and early history ==
The Rane family originally hailed from Rajasthan. They arrived in the Sattari region approximately thirty to forty years prior to the arrival of the Portuguese. The founding ancestor of the family, Satroji (also known as Kshetroji) Rane, established the settlement of the Sattari region, which was under the authority of the Sawants of Wadi at the time.

In 1746, following a war between the Sawants and the Portuguese, the Portuguese annexed Sattari mahal, placing the Rane family under Portuguese control. Over the years, in response to Portuguese attacks and oppression, the Ranes organized 14 revolts of varying scale.

== The 1852 Revolt ==
In 1852, Dipaji Rane organized the first major rebellion against the administration of the Portuguese Governor-General, Viscount de Ourém. The Governor-General had imposed restrictions on local village institutions and religious practices, leading to the oppression of the residents of Sattari. In response, Dipaji Rane traveled secretly across various villages to motivate the public to resist Portuguese injustice.

On 26 January 1852, the insurgents launched their first raid on the fort of Nanuz, capturing it from the Portuguese. The rebels then advanced throughout the Sattari area, burning down police stations, looting government treasuries, and driving out Portuguese authority to establish local rule. The rebellion subsequently expanded to neighboring areas, including Hemadbarsem, Quepem, Canacona, Bhatagram, and Ponda.

To sustain the military campaign, Rane devised a plan to levy contributions from wealthy individuals. However, these wealthy elites remained loyal to the government and initiated counter-propaganda against the insurgents.

== Military conflict and settlement ==
The Portuguese government reorganized its armed forces to stop the uprising. In response, the insurgents utilized the surrounding dense forests to stage guerrilla attacks against the troops. As the morale of the Portuguese military began to collapse, an attempt was made to lay siege to the rebel stronghold at Satregad via Murev, but the operation failed.

Following the military failure, Governor-General Viscount de Ourém sought peace talks through the mediation of Pegado. Dipaji Rane accepted Pegado's mediation and submitted demands to the Governor-General concerning the welfare and rights of the local population.

The Governor-General accepted all of Rane's demands, officially ending the conflict. Dipaji Rane was formally honored by the colonial administration with robes of honor, a ceremonial sword, and the military rank of Captain.
