= 2000 Church bombings of South India =

Islamist terrorist bombings in Karnataka, Goa, and Andhra Pradesh

The 2000 church bombings were a series of bombings that targeted churches in the southern Indian states of Karnataka, Goa and Andhra Pradesh by the Islamist extremist group Deendar Anjuman in 2000.

== Church bombings ==
On 21 May 2000, a Christian church in Machilipatnam was bombed. On 28 May 2000, bombs exploded in churches at Medak and Vikarabad. On 8 June 2000, two bombs exploded at St Anne's Church in Wadi. The church was damaged and two persons were injured.

On 8 July 2000, two churches were bombed in Andhra Pradesh, Gewett Memorial Baptist Church in Ongole and the Mother Vannini Catholic Church in Tadepalligudem town. The blast in the Ongole church injured three persons. That same day, a blast took place at St John's Lutheran Church in Hubbali. On 9 July 2000, a bomb exploded at the SS Peter and Paul Church in Bengaluru. The following day, 9 July 2000, a bomb went off accidentally while the terrorists were transporting them in a Maruti van. Later on 9 June 2000, a bomb exploded at St Andrew's church in Vasco, Goa.

== Ban and legal proceedings ==
Deendar Anjuman was banned in May 2001 for engineering the serial bomb blasts, and carrying out a hate campaign against the Christian community. The group's founder Siddique is reported to have hated Christians after the British colonial government in 1934 jailed Siddiqui and 18 of his followers for indulging in inflammatory speeches and writings.

In October 2007, the ban was extended and the group declared an unlawful association under the Unlawful Activities (Prevention) Act for "indulging in activities which are pre-judicial to the security of the country having the potential to disturb peace and communal harmony and to disrupt the secular fabric of the country".

In 2008, capital punishment was awarded to 11 people and life sentence to 12 others by a local court. The prime accused in the case, Zia-ul-Hassan, was the son of Syed Siddique Hussain, the founder of Deendar Anjuman. Zia-ul-Hassan had migrated to Pakistan and used to visit Hyderabad during his father's death anniversary. The accused believed that the "blasts at churches in India would trigger a civil war between Hindus and Christians, and a religious leader from Afghanistan would invade and conquer India, which would be converted into an Islamic country". The conspiracy began in October 1999 in Hyderabad, during the death anniversary of its founder Hajrath Moulana Siddiqui.
