= Nilesh Naik =

Indian environmental martyr (1970–1995)

- A photograph taken during Naik's cremation wearing a floral garland in 1995
- Born: Nilesh Mohan Naik; 22 May 1970; Savoi-Verem, Goa, India
- Died: 23 January 1995 (aged 24); Keri, Ponda, Goa, India
- Cause of death: Excessive use of force (gunshot wounds to the chest)
- Resting place: Thapar-DuPont factory site, Keri, Ponda, Goa, India; 15°27′39.69″N 74°0′47.21″E
- Monuments: Nilesh Naik Memorial, Keri, Ponda, Goa, India
- Occupations: Environmental activist; farmworker
- Known for: Goa's first environmental martyr; India's first direct environmental martyr
- Movement: Anti-Nylon 6,6 movement

Nilesh Mohan Naik (22 May 1970 – 23 January 1995) was an Indian environmental activist and farmworker belonging to the scheduled tribe community. He was shot to death during the Anti-Nylon 6,6 movement at Keri plateau, Ponda. He is popularly known as Goa's first environmental martyr.

== Early and personal life ==
Nilesh Mohan Naik was born on 22 May 1970 to Rekha Gawde at Savoi-Verem, Goa. He belonged to the scheduled tribe community and had three brothers, including Naresh Mohan Naik and Mahesh Naik. On 27 October 2020, Naresh, aged 40, died suffering injuries from a road accident at Savoi-Verem.

== Death ==
Around 1980s, the Goa Industrial Development Corporation (GIDC) acquired land at Bhoot Khamb, Ponda for the production of Nylon 6,6. The ₹6 billion (equivalent to ₹140 billion or US$1.4 billion in 2023) project was started by American multinational company, DuPont in collaboration with Indian business conglomerate, Thapar Group. Despite the usage of two hazardous chemicals, hexamethylenediamine and adipic acid, the project was declared as "pollution free". Later the locals became aware of the environmental hazards which would pose danger to the water resources and bagayats plantations thereafter beginning a long-drawn agitation that lasted for several years.

On 14 October 1994, the plant was attacked by the villagers which cost the authorities almost ₹10 million (equivalent to ₹66 million or US$680,000 in 2023). On 17 January 1995, Dr. Dattaram Desai, convener of the Anti-Nylon 6,6 Citizens Action Committee and two other activists were arrested, stripped and assaulted at the police station. On 18 January 1995, the church supported, All Goa Citizens Committee for Social Justice and Action (AGCCSJA) wrote to the then Goa Governor, Gopala Ramanujam expressing their distress over the government's move to subdue the opposition against the project.

On 23 January 1995, a busload of U.S. DuPont officials along three police jeeps were greeted by 70 protesters mainly women and children that were sitting on the road that lead to the factory. When the women refused to let the officials pass, the police present, advised the DuPont officials to return at Panjim wherein they met then Goa Chief minister, Pratapsingh Rane and demanded to take a strict action on the activists. Around 4:30 pm, two busload of Goa Police opened fired at the protesters without any prior warning to disperse, Naik was shot at point blank range while trying to save a woman from police atrocities and died from gunshot wounds to the chest soon after he was admitted to a nearby hospital, while others suffered minor injuries at Bhoot Khamb, Ponda.

Following his death, the protesters as an act of vengeance assaulted the police, stripped some of them and chased them into the woods. Next they headed towards the company's office and burnt down everything. The company later shut down its services in Goa and relocated at Tamil Nadu.

== Cremation ==
The morning after Naik's murder, his body was taken to the Ponda bus station wherein a crowd of around 400 people were assembled to escort his body to his native village at Savoi-Verem and then to the factory site where he was cremated. The body was displayed in an open van, garlanded with flowers, around late afternoon the numbers bulged to more than 4,000 people gathered at the factory site. The leaders of the Anti-nylon 6,6 negotiated with the Thapar-DuPont Ltd. (TDL) security force to evacuate the site and factory officials were apprised that their presence would provoke violence, they later agreed to leave the site, escorted by the committee members.

Many eminent Goans spoke at Naik's funeral, thereafter he was hailed as the first martyr of the Goan environmental movement. The throng present, later renamed the plateau in his honour but before his pyre was set on fire, a large explosion was witnessed at the factory site and a massive cloud of smoke rose from the TDL administrative complex, where the electricity generator was blown away.

The company officials were shocked over the issue that followed to the demise of Naik, said TDL manager, Sam Singh. He also further stated that they had no plans moving out of Goa. After several meetings with DuPont and Thapar officials, the government remained quiet on the Nylon 6,6 issue, although Goa Chief minister, Rane eliminated many administrative obstacles for the factory but complained that the opposition were against the development of Goa.

== Aftermath ==
On 23 January 1995, Chief minister, Rane ordered a judicial inquiry into the shooting and rewarded ₹25,000 (equivalent to ₹150,000 or US$1,500 in 2023) to Naik's family. The then Goa Legislative Assembly, Leader of Opposition, Surendra Sirsat stated that no mass movement can be suppressed by the police. The managing director of the plant, Virendra (Sam) Singh mourned the death of Naik from the police shooting and was willing to meet up with the locals to clear up the misunderstanding that took place.

On 26 January 1995, India's 46th Republic Day, the activists unfolded the national flag at the Thapar-DuPont factory as a gesture of their opposition after a shutdown was imposed on 24 January 1995 to protest the shootings that took place. The church groups and environmentalists of Goa deemed the Thapar DuPont Nylon 6,6 plant as an "unwanted guest". According to the Goa Police sources, they had first burst tear gas shells to disperse the protesters blockade at the road. But it backfired and engendered the crowd to go on a rampage which resulted in lighting up a police van and three jeeps, assaulted several policemen, kidnapped four of them and stripped some of them. They also stated that the violent mob also plundered a company's office at the nearby Ponda town.

On 27 January 1995, Dr. Desai told the media at Panaji that the protests will now be stepped up to provide a clear message of solidarity to DuPont. The project initially was set to produce nylon filament and industrial tire-cord yarn and promised 600 jobs to the locals. M. K. Jos of the citizens committee stated that the jobs promised was simply not worth for the ₹6 billion project. Jos further stated that the church groups were mobilizing people for a "unified drive" against the American multinational company since the 1980s when the two companies had planned to start their factory in Goa. It is also said that chief minister, Rane and other politicians of the Goa Legislative Assembly had favoured the project as it was expected to become the state's largest industrial infrastructure.

A panel of legislators who had made a study on the project, recommended it to be ended due to its multiple effects posing danger to the environment. A village local, Dolu Babu Kolekar stated that after decades residing at the village, the newly built plant had been a blockade to religious sites present. Claude Alvares, an environmentalist said the factory plant is nearby Mangueshi which happens to be Goa's foremost famous Hindu temple complex and the Old Goa church complex which is about 15 km (9.3 mi) away, he further added that it's also close to the Opa water works which was Goa's vital source of drinking water during the 1990s.

== Legacy ==
A samadhi (a square stone memorial, typically 6 feet across) was constructed in Naik's name at Bhoot Khamb plateau, Ponda known as the Nilesh Naik Memorial, which included a tombstone bearing the epitaph "Martyr of the anti-Nylon-66 agitation Nilesh Mohan Naik". On 29 January 2021, at Naik's 26th death anniversary, the villagers of Querim and Savoi-Verem along with the members of the Naik clan paid floral tributes at the memorial, they also demanded the Government of Goa to build a hall or Ravindra Bhavan in his name, stating that it'll be essential for neighbouring panchayats such as Verem Vagurbem, Volvoi and Querim, Ponda.

A village local, Dinesh Naik also stated that there's ample of vast land available at the Querim plateau, Ponda some of which could be utilised to construct the hall. He further added that every year the locals remember Naik but no government representatives visit the memorial. Since Naik's death, significant organizations including the Catholic Church and the then Goa Legislative Assembly opposition party, Bharatiya Janata Party, had shown their full support behind the campaign.

Naik is also remembered thrice a year when the national flag is hosted on India's Republic day (26 January), India's Independence day (15 August) and Goa Liberation Day (19 December) at his memorial in Bhoot Khamb plateau, Ponda.

== See also ==
- Floriano Vaz
