= World Konkani Day =

Day of remembrance for Shenoi Goembab

World Konkani Day (Konkani: Vishwa Konkani Dis) has been celebrated on 9 April every year since 2015. It is in remembrance of Konkani activist, Shenoi Goembab On this day, Konkani language writers are honoured.

== Goembab's influence ==
Goembab is credited with having written seven books in Latin or Romi Konkani and 22 in Konkani in the Devanagari script, His works comprise short stories, dramas, novels, poetry, essays, works on linguistics, philosophy and history. He is also considered as an ideological founder of the Konkani cause by language protagonists in the 20th and 21st centuries.

== Celebrations ==
The first edition of the event in Goa was celebrated on 9 April 2015. As the event was a success, it was held again each year on that date until at least 2022.

On 11 April 2017, the event was observed for the first time in Belagavi, formerly Belgaum, which lies in Karnataka State. Bishop of Belagavi, Rev. Peter Machado has been quoted saying that Konkani speaking people in the region comprised to Saraswats, Christians, Daivadnyas and Konkan Marathas, yet "the Konkani speaking people from the upper ghats region comprising from Yellapur to Kolhapur have painstakingly conserved the language and culture, the legacy that needs to be carried forward till the next century."

== Other celebrations ==
Konkani Day has also been observed on 20 August, the day on which Konkani was included as part of the Eighth Schedule of the Indian Constitution. This celebration was marked in 2017 at a school in Margao, Goa, the Vidya Vikas Mandal.

Mandd Sobhann in Mangalore (now Mangaluru) has also organised a World Konkani Convention, though different from the event mentioned above.

In Abu Dhabi, a Konkani Cultural Day was held in April in 2018.

World Konkani Unity Day was also scheduled to be held in December in 2010 in Mangalore.

World Kokani Day was held for the first time in January 2020 in Mumbai.

== World Goa Day ==
Another day, called the World Goa Day is also organised on 20 August, for the past two decades, by volunteers in various pockets across the globe, more to link up the diaspora from Goa with their home and among themselves.

== See also ==
- Kokborok Day
- Hindi Day
- Marathi Language Day
- Memon Day
