= Divja =

Lamp-bearing tradition in Goa, India

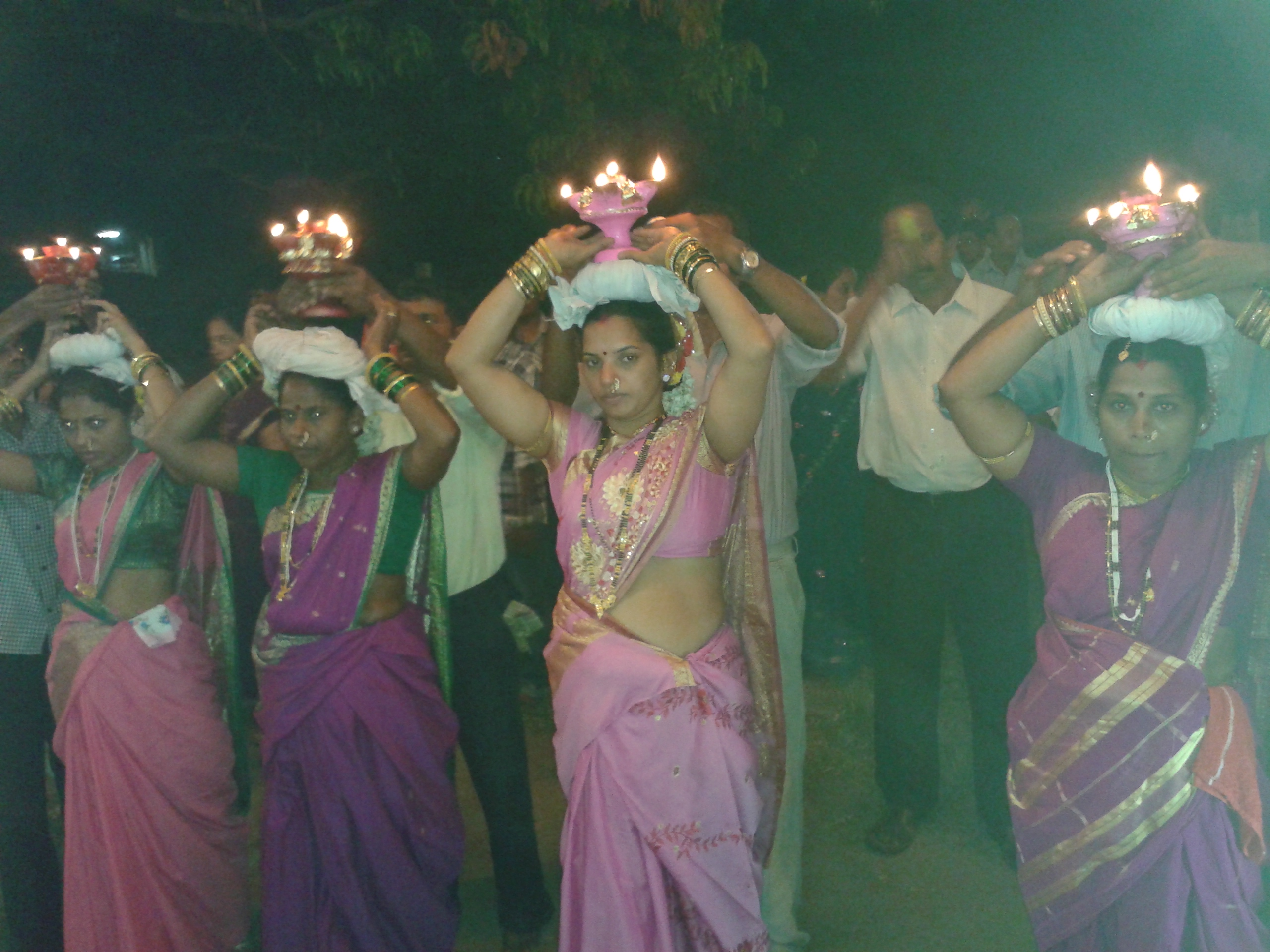
Divja- morji

Divja (also known as Divzanchi Jatra) is a traditional ritualistic lamp-bearing procession practiced in Goa. The ritual involves women carrying and performing an unvalni (a ceremonial circumambulation) with specially designed oil lamps known as divja around a deity within a temple.

== Ritual ==
A divja is a distinctive type of lamp, traditionally crafted from clay, though brass or steel versions are now also commonly used. The structure consists of five small cups designed to hold oil and wicks, mounted on a base. A specific design feature includes a small projection, or "beak," which facilitates the lighting of the wicks. Participants hold the lamp firmly at the narrow section connecting the base to the upper part.

The ritual is typically initiated at the primary deity's temple, where participants perform five to seven circumambulations before the lamps are immersed, often at a designated water body or back at the main shrine. The practice involves women, often those who have taken a vow, carrying the lit divja in a procession. They may be accompanied by a Gurav (temple priest) who places the lamp on the woman's head before the procession begins, although in some traditions, the women hold the lamps in their hands.

== Social and cultural significance ==
The performance of divja is often associated with the fulfillment of vows. In some communities, unmarried women participate in a specific ritual known as divja lavap, which is considered a significant rite of passage.

Historically, the right to perform this ritual was often hereditary, belonging to specific families or castes—such as the Gurav, Nayak, Gavde, Desai, Madval, Mhar, Chamar, Mhale, Mest, and Kumar—within their respective ancestral villages or for their kuldevata (family deity). In villages where this right is held by specific lineages, only descendants of those families are permitted to perform the ritual.

=== Modern context ===
The divja tradition is practiced Goan villages, including Morjim, Chopdem, Mandrem, Parse, Dhargal, Korgao, Shivoli, Hadfade, Agarwado, and Sonsay. However, modern women do not find the practice as important as the older generations did.

== Timing and locations ==
The Divzanchi Jatra is held in numerous villages across Goa, with several major processions often occurring on the same night. The timing of these events is tied to specific lunar dates and varies by location.

- Hebar-Padde: Chaitra Purnima
- Bori (Navdurga Temple): Kartik Vadya Padva
- Gavne: Kartik Purnima
- Sristhal-Canacona: Phalguna Vadya Shashthi
- Kumari-Sanguem: Kartik Purnima
- Divchale-Amona: Kartik Vadya Chaturdashi

Other notable locations where these processions take place include the temples at Hebar, Kapileshwari, Karle, Advalpal, and Madkai.
