= Navdurga Temple, Madkai =

Hindu temple in Madkai, Goa, India

Coordinates: 15°25′08″N 73°56′37″E

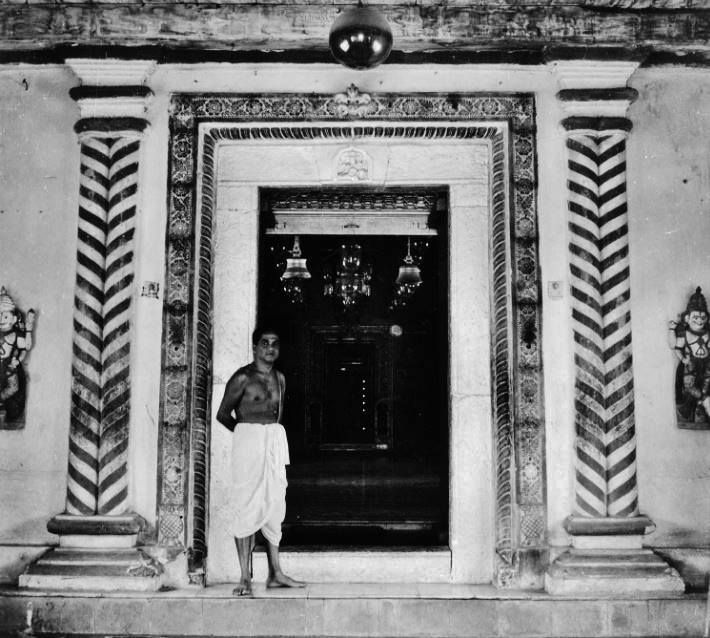
Navdurga temple entrance (1950s)

Shree Navdurga Devasthan is a notable Hindu temple located in Goa, India. Dedicated to the goddess Navdurga, the deity is venerated across two major locations, Madkai and Kundaim, following historical migrations and administrative splits within the community.

The temple in Madkai is renowned for its unique idol of the goddess, which features a tilted head. The temple is also known for hosting an annual festival called "Zatra of Goddess Navdurga" or just "Zatra" which takes place around November each year, specifically on Kartik Shukla Paksha Ashtami. The temple is also known for the controversy, which began in 2016, over a decision to replace the temple idol. This decision led to a legal and social dispute between the Brahmin Mahajans and local Bahujan villagers over temple ownership and control.

== History ==
=== Origin and migration ===
Due to a growing population of Gaud Saraswat Brahmins (GSBs), several GSB families originally residing in Verna village within the Sashti (Salcete) province moved to establish a new settlement in Ganshi, located in Tiswadi. This was supported by the local Gauda community. In Ganshi, the settlers consecrated an image of their patron deity (Ishtadevata), Goddess Navdurga.

In subsequent generations, certain members of the GSB community migrated further into the Antruz Mahal area, founding the villages of Madkai and Kundaim. During the era of Portuguese colonial rule, in which Hinduism was discouraged, the Hindu inhabitants of the village chose to relocate their revered deity to Madkai to preserve it. The idol was initially housed in a locality known as 'Talyakhol' within the Parampay ward of Madkai.

=== Consecration in Madkai ===
According to local stories, a villager belonging to the Kamat family experienced a divine possession. Under this influence, he instructed the community to permanently establish the shrine at the exact spot where a coconut thrown by him would land. The coconut fell within the Duthal ward of Madkai, which subsequently became the site for the construction of the deity's permanent temple.

=== Separation to Kundaim ===
At a later period, internal disputes arose within the joint village administration (Gramasanstha) governing Madkai and Kundaim, resulting in the formation of two distinct, independent village bodies. Following this division, the residents of Kundaim commissioned a separate replica of Goddess Navdurga and installed it in the Dasol ward of Kundaim. This historical split led to the coexistence of two separate Navdurga temples across both administrative areas.

== Architecture and design ==
The Navdurga temple situated in Madkai is located in an area colloquially termed Devalwado. The structure is positioned at the base of a hill and faces a western direction. While modest in scale, the temple architecture is noted for its visual appeal. The inner sanctum (garbhagriha) contains a stone idol (pashanmurti) of Goddess Navdurga, depicted in a seated posture (pattasana) upon a flat pedestal. The deity is rendered in the meditative aspect of Mahishasuramardini, featuring a distinct physical attribute where her neck is visibly inclined toward the left side.

=== Legend of the tilted neck ===
A popular local narrative explains the tilt of the idol's neck. A wealthy merchant or devotee (Mahajan) from Karnataka had made a sacred vow (navas) to offer champa flowers valued at one thousand rupees to the goddess. Upon traveling to Madkai to fulfill his promise, he discovered that no florists were available that day due to a shortage. Eventually, he encountered a single flower vendor who had sold out all stock except for one remaining champa blossom. When the devotee asked for the price, the vendor jokingly quoted a sum of one thousand rupees. Accepting the price, the devotee purchased the single flower, offered it to the goddess, and asked if his vow had been successfully accepted. At that moment, the idol's neck tilted to the left in a gesture of affirmation, remaining permanently fixed in that position.

== Festivals and rituals ==
Because the daily Navami is considered highly auspicious, the temple hosts a regular palanquin festival (Shibikotsav) every night.

=== Annual Jatrotsav ===
The grandest celebration at the temple is the annual seven-day festival (Jatrotsav), observed from Kartik Vadya Chaturthi (fourth day) to Dasami (tenth day). The festival features traditional rituals, theatrical plays (natak), and processions utilizing ceremonial transport vehicles including the Sukhasan, Lalakhi, and Palkhi.

- Kartik Vadya Panchami to Saptami: Specialized worship services are held on Panchami (fifth day). This is followed by the Sukhasan procession on Shashti (sixth day) and the Lalakhi procession on Saptami (seventh day).
- Kartik Vadya Ashtami: On the eighth day, the deity is ritually transported to reside at the ancestral home of the Madkaikar Shetye family in Duthalwado. According to historical lore, a goldsmith named Shetye was crafting a golden idol of Goddess Navdurga, and its physical appearance increasingly resembled his own daughter. As the idol neared completion, his daughter grew weak and eventually passed away. The goddess subsequently gave a boon to Shetye, promising to reside at his home for one day during the initial phase of the annual festival. A traditional boat festival (Sangodd) is also conducted at dawn on this day.
- Kartik Navami (Ninth Day): This is the principal day of the Jatrotsav, marked by fasting. A formal evening offering (upahar) is presented around 5:00 PM. Vast crowds assemble to fulfill personal vows and present ritual offerings (honti) consisting of coconut and blouse pieces. A chariot (Ratha) procession takes place at dawn, after which the deity is seated upon ornate ceremonial structures (tarangas) constructed by the Mhalwadkar family.
- Dasami: Around 10:00 AM, accompanied by traditional music, the deity is escorted back toward her original residence in Parampay, staying there for two to three hours. Devotees from Parampay and surrounding areas gather with deep reverence to welcome the goddess, preparing a day in advance. Between 12:00 PM and 1:00 PM, the deity's chariot departs for the original site, halting en route near the Betal temple at Talyaband. During the afternoon, associated female devotees light ceremonial lamps (divja). At approximately 4:30 PM, the chariot enters the main temple courtyard amidst music, circles the inner grounds five times, and officially concludes the Jatrotsav.

Following the main week of celebration, an extended public worship phase called Khalillo Puja continues for an additional 10 to 15 days.

== Patrons ==
The original founding patrons and trustees (Mahajans) of the temple in Madkai are from the Madkai village community, belonging to families with the surnames Kamat, Nevrekar, and Bharne. These patrons are organized into specific clans (Vangdis) and spiritual lineages (Gotras):

Vangdis and gotras in Madkai
Vangdi (Clan / Family Surnames)	Gotra
Mhalwadkar and Vadalkar	Atri
Vondkar and Duthalkar Kamat	Bharadwaj
Buldo	Atri
Dhakonkar Kamat	Bharadwaj
Panajikar Kamat	Atri
Betikar (alias Betkar) Kamat	Bharadwaj
Nevrekar, Shenvi Nevrekar	Kaushik
Bharne, Shenvi Bharne	Vatsa

Beyond the primary founders, the temple also recognizes secondary patrons known as Palvi Mahajans. These individuals belong to the Atri, Bharadwaj, Sharpabing, and Pingal gotras, and include families bearing the surnames Timble, Khadche, Mad, and Kare.

== 2016 conflict ==
In 2016, the temple's managing body, the Navadurga Sansthan Committee decided to replace the temple's idol, claiming that it had developed cracks. The committee is composed mainly of Gaud Saraswat Brahmins or GSB Mahajans. This decision was strongly opposed by the local villagers, who formed the Shri Devi Navadurga Prathishtan Trust, arguing that the idol and the temple belong to the public rather than being a private property of the Mahajans.

This soon escalated into a broader debate over the ownership and control of the temple, reflecting underlying social tensions between the Brahmin Mahajans and the Bahujan (non-Brahmin) villagers. The villagers asserted that the temple has always been a public entity and that they had the right to preserve the existing idol and participate in temple rituals, which the Mahajans had traditionally controlled.

The Mahajans assert that the temple belongs to them, stating it was built when they migrated to Marcaim. In contrast, the villagers argue that the Mahajans gained their status by exploiting their privileged caste position to register under the controversial 19th century Portuguese-era Lei das Mazanias, a law which regulated temple administration and property rights. The villagers state that the temple rightfully belongs to the entire village.

The conflict has led to legal battles, with the issue being taken to court multiple times. As of 2023, the case has yet to be fully resolved, but it continues to be a significant point of contention in the community.
