= Usgao =

Village in Goa, India

Coordinates: 15°26′55″N 74°04′00″E

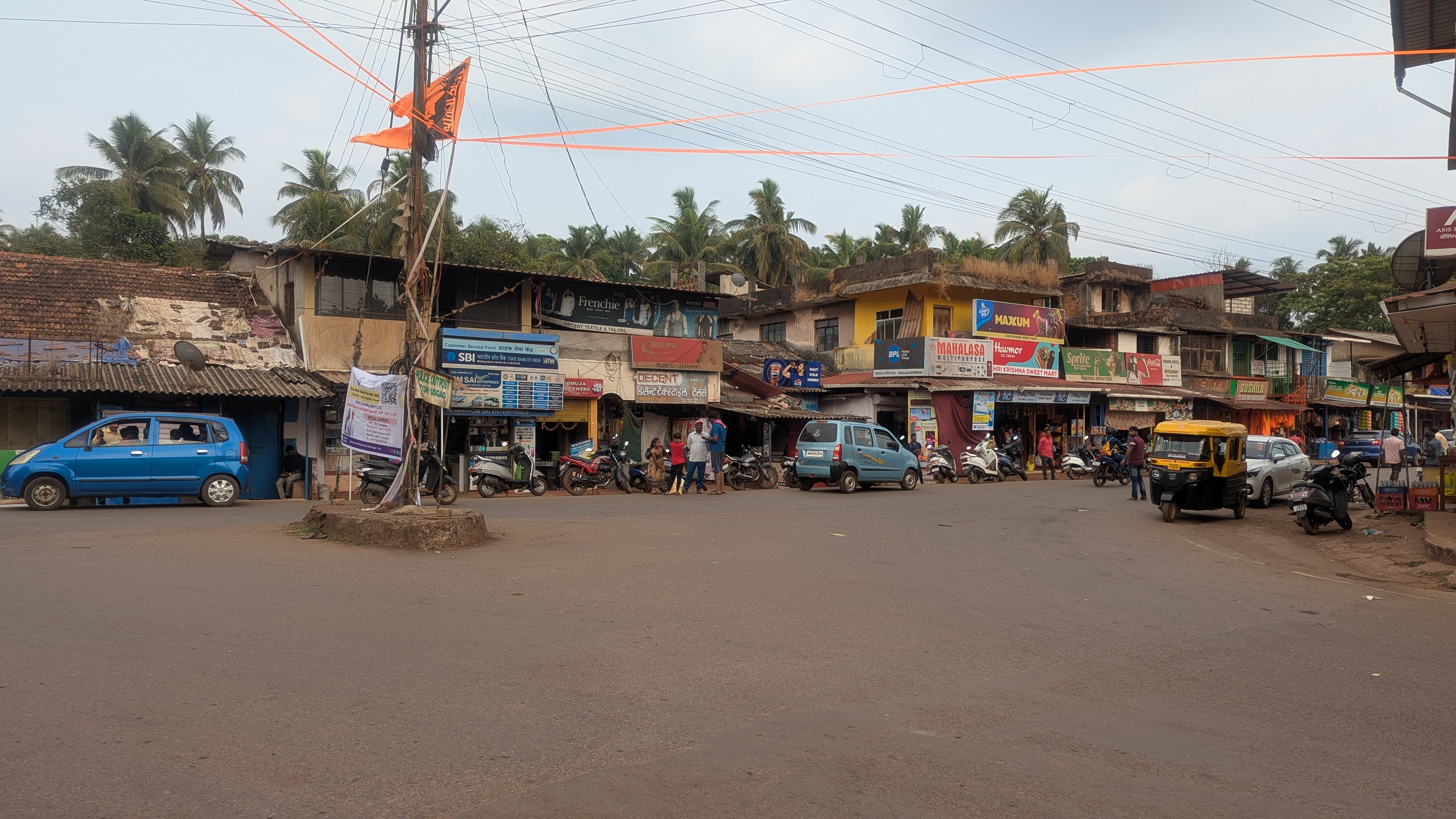
Usgao tisk

Usgao is a village in Ponda taluka, North Goa district, India.

For census purposes, it is considered a "Census Town". It is part of the Usgao-Ganjem Village Panchayat.

In the 2011 Census, Usgao was found to have an area of 25.40 square kilometres, with 2,867 households, and a population of 12,436 persons, comprising 6,370 males and 6,066 females. The zero-to-six age group population comprised 1,254 children; of these, 614 were males and 6640 were females.

Usgao (together with Ganjem) sought to be included in the newly-formed Dharbandora taluka. But a May 2011 Goa government decision accepted to retain this panchayat area within Ponda taluka or sub-district.
