= INS Mysore =

The following ships of the Indian Navy have been named Mysore:

- INS Mysore (C60) was formerly the Crown Colony-class cruiser HMS Nigeria acquired in 1957 from the Royal Navy and stricken in 1985
- INS Mysore (D60) a Delhi-class destroyer launched in 1993
