= Shenoi Goembab =

Goan writer and activist (1877–1946)

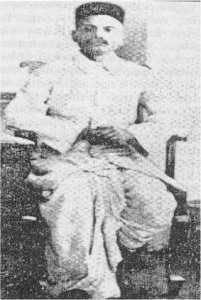
- Goembab in an undated photograph
- Born: Waman Raghunath Shennoi Varde Valaulikar; 23 June 1877; Bicholim, Goa, Portuguese India
- Died: 9 April 1946 (aged 68); Bombay, British India
- Occupations: Writer; activist
- Spouse: Shantabai Valaulikar
- Children: 4
- Writing career
- Language: Konkani

Waman Raghunath Shennoi Varde Valaulikar (23 June 1877 – 9 April 1946), better known as Shenoi Goembab, was a Goan writer and activist of the Konkani language.

== Early life ==
Waman Raghunath Shennoi Varde Valaulikar was born on 23 June 1877 at Bicholim, Goa, which was part of Portuguese India during the Portuguese Empire (now in India). He came from a notable family which boast the presence of diplomats. One of his progenitors was a diplomat of a local potentate in the court of the Portuguese in Goa, while another is reported to have been was Delegate or Ambassador of the Portuguese Government at the Court of the Peshwas in Poona, British India.

Goembab's father, however, was not a successful man, who was reported to have held the position of manager in the household of a rich relative and subsequently a poor shopkeeper in Bicholim. He attended primary school in Marathi till 6th grade and then joined a Portuguese primary school, where he completed "Segundo Grau" (roughly 4th grade).

After discontinuing studies due to financial constraints he taught himself Sanskrit and English at home. He went to the city of Bombay (now Mumbai) in 1893 and continued with his studies there, completing High School in 1898. He was married to Shantabai in Mumbai and had two sons and two daughters.

It is believed that Goembab earned his nickname when he was going along with his uncle Chintamanrao to Bombay aboard a steamer. A friend on board the ship remarked to his uncle "I hear you are taking this Goembab (Gentleman from Goa) with you to Bombay." The young and idealistic Goembab later used "Shennoi Goembab" as his pen-name.

== Career ==
Valaulikar returned to Goa in 1899 and took up a job as a school teacher, but later left it as he wasn't satisfied. He went to Karachi, British India and worked there for some time as a clerk in the Lahore Municipality. He returned to Bombay where he got married and later got a job with the Italian Consulate. Later he joined a German company, Meister Lucius & Bruening, as a stenographer.

Due to World War I, the Germans had to leave and Valaulikar was left in charge of the company. He managed the company well in the absence of its management and on their return, he earned their praise. Later he was promoted to the post of a secretary of the company. However, due to some disgruntled employees he was accused of mismanagement and left the company. After this he dedicated his life to revitalising the Konkani language.

=== Writing ===
Valaulikar had started writing in Konkani while working in Bombay. His wife was an illiterate but had a very good knowledge of Konkani language and folklore. He made her recite the tales and proverbs and put them in writing which were published later. "Goenkaaranchi Goianbhaili Vosnook" (Goan migrants outside Goa) was a series of history lectures given by Goembab at the Saraswat Brahman Samaj, Bombay, in 1927.

Another historical book he wrote was "Albuquerquan Goen Kashe Jikle" (How Albuquerque Won Goa). "Mhaji Baa Khai Gelli?" is regarded as the first modern Konkani short-story. It was published in "Gomantopnishat", which is a two-volume collection of fiction and non-fiction. The second volume contained "Sonvsar Budti" (The drowning of the world). It used the story of the Great Flood to discuss various philosophies and includes parts from various religious works such as the Upanishads, Bible, Qur'an and Talmud.

He believed that Konkani language was awaiting a revolution and it could only be brought about by its youth. This was revealed in his essays "Amrutacho Pavs" (The Rain of Nectar) and "Konkani Vidyarthiank" (For Konkani Students). One of his major contribution was towards children's literature. "Bhurgianche Vyakran" (Children's Grammar) was written in a series of question-answers that he used to teach his son and "Bhurgianlo Ishtt" was a collection of short stories.

Valaulikar has also translated many works into Konkani, the chief among them being Molière's Le Médecin malgré lui, which he translated as "Mogachen Logn" (Love Marriage) and Shakespeare's Othello, Hamlet and King Lear. He is most remembered for his translation of the Bhagavad Gita into Konkani: "Bhagwantalem Geet".

=== Activism ===
In an autobiographical reference, Goembab credits the Barão de Cumbarjua (Baron of Cumbarjua), Tomás Morão, with opening his eyes to the fact that it was Konkani, and not Marathi, which was the mother-tongue of Goans. In anecdote he recounts in Konkani Bhashechem Zoit, Goembab indicates that in about 1899, he had written a book "O Mestre Portugués" for use in the Marathi-Portuguese schools that had been established by the Estado da Índia in Goa since 1871.

At the time the Morão, was the Inspector of Schools in Goa. In that book, Goembab indicates that he had introduced lessons covering grammatical rules, meanings of words and sentences for teaching the art of translation. In the Portuguese introduction, he recounts "I had, in my ignorance, referred to Marathi as "Lingua Vernacular" i.e., local language. After reading that introduction, Morão pointed to my mistake saying, "the local language of Goa is Konkani, how can it be Marathi?". I saw the truth in that statement. And I have not forgotten that incident till this day."

He had observed how Konkani had diminished in status among Goans and Marathi and Portuguese had taken the place of respect among the educated, upper class Hindus and Christians respectively. Konkani was used only to communicate with their employees, the poor and downtrodden castes. He believed that no matter how many languages a person could communicate in to earn a living, he was lost if he could not communicate in his mother tongue, the "language of your soul" as he called it. "We have been shining under others' lamps", observed Shenoi Goembab.

He began telling Konkanis about the sweetness of their mother tongue and of its rich past. He started writing books to propagate his views. Not only did he see the Konkani language as an inseparable part of every Goan's and Konkani's identity. He also saw it as a movement against Portuguese rule in Goa.

Goembab wrote 7 books in the Roman script and 22 in Devanagari. This included short stories, dramas novels, poetry, essays, linguistics, philosophy history.

Perhaps, ahead of his time, Shenoi Goembab stressed on the need to eliminate caste barriers and get the lower castes educated. He said "let's make Pandits (scholars) out of Gawdes (farmers)".

In a communally divided linguistic community Waman Shenoi spread the message of peace and unity without rejecting religion. He equated Santeri (a Goddess popular among Goans) with the Virgin Mary to get the Goan Catholics and Hindus, two major communities of Goa, to join hands for Konkani. He would chant "Om Santeri Have Mercy on Us! Holy virgin Mother Bless Our Way!"

== Death ==
Goembab died on 9 April 1946 in the city of Bombay, British India, and his death anniversary, is now observed as Vishwa Konkani Dis (World Konkani Day).

== Awards ==
On 9 April 2000, Goembab was posthumously awarded the Konkani Person of the Millennium award by Mandd Sobhann (a Mangalore based Konkani organisation), on his 54th death anniversary.

== Legacy ==
The Shenoi Goembab School of Languages and Literature is established by the amalgamation of six conventional language departments active in the field of languages and literature, viz., Department of Konkani (established in 1987), Department of Marathi (1970), Department of Hindi (1965), Department of English (1965), Department of Portuguese (1987) and Department of French (1965) of Goa University.

== See also ==
- Konkani Language
- Konkani people
- Shenoy
