= José da Costa Nunes =

Portuguese Catholic Cardinal

His Eminence José Cardinal da Costa Nunes GCIC
- Archbishop of Goa e Damão; Patriarch of the East Indies
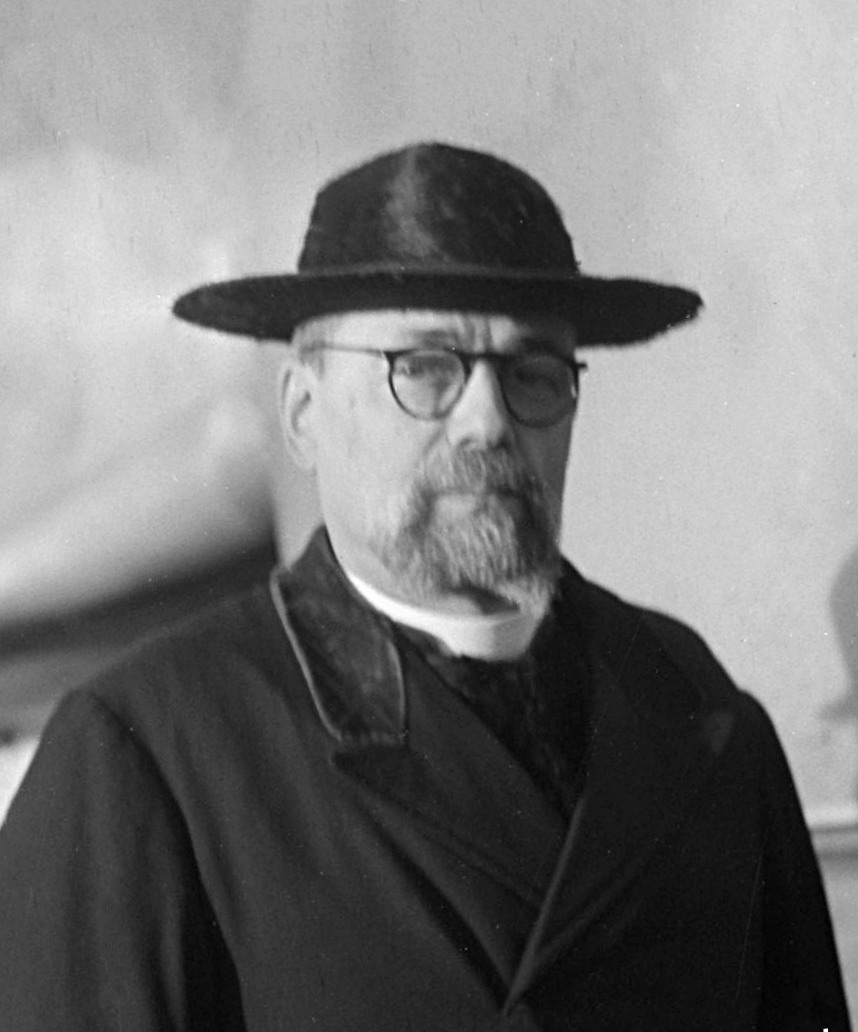
- José Cardinal da Costa Nunes in 1946
- Archdiocese: Archdiocese of Goa and Daman
- Province: Goa and Daman
- Metropolis: Goa and Daman
- See: Goa and Daman
- Elected: 11 December 1940
- Term ended: 16 September 1953
- Predecessor: Teotónio Emanuel Ribeiro Vieira de Castro
- Successor: José Vieira Alvernaz
- Other post: Cardinal-Priest of Santa Prisca

Orders
- Ordination: 26 July 1903 by Bishop João Paulino de Azevedo e Castro
- Consecration: 20 November 1921 by Bishop Manuel Damasceno da Costa
- Created cardinal: 19 March 1962 by Pope John XXIII
- Rank: Cardinal-Priest

Personal details
- Born: José da Costa Nunes; 15 March 1880 Candelaria do Pico, Azores, Kingdom of Portugal
- Died: 29 November 1976 (aged 96) Clinica Madonna di Fatima, Rome, Metropolitan City of Rome, Lazio, Italy.
- Buried: Church of Candelária; 28.3512°N 16.3697°W
- Denomination: Roman Catholic
- Residence: Rome
- Parents: José da Costa Nunes(Sr.).^{(Father)}. Francisca Felizarda de Castro.^{(Mother)}
- Profession: Bishop of Macau (1920-1921); Archbishop of Goa e Damão (1940-1953); Titular Patriarch of Odessus (1953-1962); Vice Camerlengo of the Apostolic Camera (1953-1962)
- Education: Seminary of Angra.
- Motto: Duc In Altum^{(Latin)} Bring Me Up^{(English)}
- Coat of arms: José Cardinal da Costa Nunes's coat of arms

Styles of José da Costa Nunes
- Reference style: His Eminence
- Spoken style: Your Eminence
- Religious style: Cardinal
- Informal style: Cardinal
- See: Goa and Daman (Emeritus)

Ordination history of José da Costa Nunes
History
Priestly ordination
- Ordained by: João Paulino de Azevedo e Castro (Macau)
- Date: 26 July 1903
- Place: Episcopal Palace chapel, Portuguese Macau
Episcopal consecration
- Consecrated by: Manuel Damasceno da Costa (Angra)
- Date: 20 November 1921
- Place: Horta, Faial, Azores
Cardinalate
- Elevated by: Pope John XXIII
- Date: 19 March 1962
Episcopal succession
Bishops consecrated by José da Costa Nunes as principal consecrator
- Bishop José Filípe do Carmo Colaço: 27 May 1956

Dom José da Costa Nunes (Chinese: 高若瑟, 15 March 1880 – 29 November 1976) was a Portuguese cardinal of the Roman Catholic Church who served as Bishop of Macau from 1920 to 1940 and Patriarch of the East Indies from 1940 to 1953. He was made a cardinal in 1962.

== Biography ==
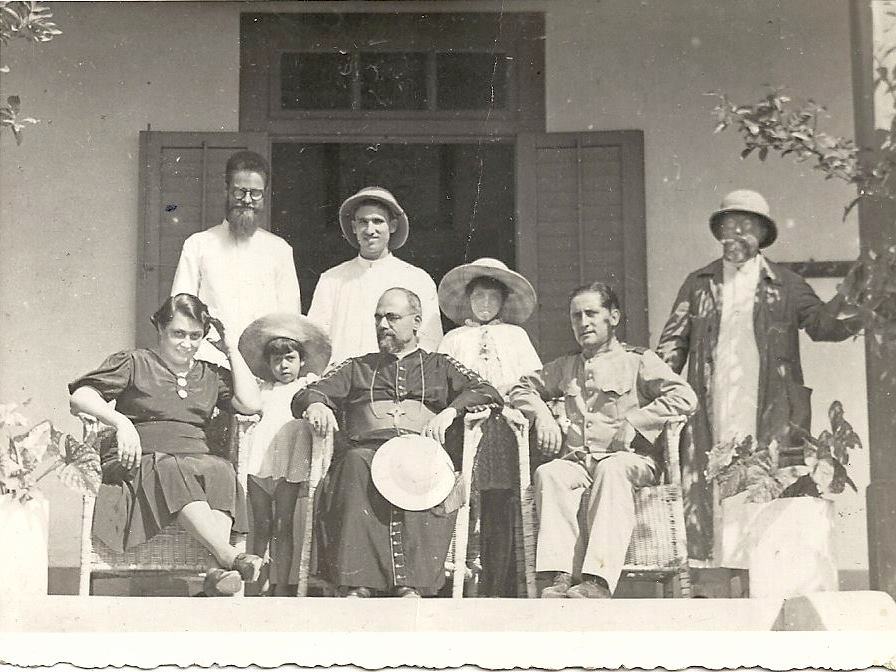
José da Costa Nunes on a visit to Portuguese Timor in 1937

José da Costa Nunes was born in Candelária, Azores, to José da Costa Nunes and his wife Francisca Felizarda de Castro Nunes. He was baptised four days later, on 19 March 1880.

After studying at the seminary in Angra, Nunes went to Macau as a missionary on 4 June 1903, and was ordained to the priesthood on the following 26 July. He then did pastoral work and taught at Macau's seminary until 1906. Nunes was named Vicar general of Macau and Timor from 1906 to 1913, when he began missionary work in Timor. He became Vicar capitular of Macau on 21 February 1917.

On 16 December 1920, Nunes was appointed Bishop of Macau by Pope Benedict XV. He received his episcopal consecration on 20 November 1921, from Bishop Emanuel da Costa, with Bishops Manuel Augusto Xavier and Francisco Nunes da Rocha serving as co-consecrators. Nunes was advanced to the Archdiocese of Goa e Damão, with title of Patriarch of the East Indies, on 11 December 1940. Resigning as Archbishop on 16 December 1953, he was made Titular Archbishop of Odessus and Vice-Camerlengo of the Holy Roman Church that same day, whilst retaining the personal title of "Patriarch".

Pope John XXIII created him Cardinal Priest of Santa Prisca in the consistory of 19 March 1962. Nunes attended the Second Vatican Council from 1962 to 1965 and he was one of the cardinal electors who participated in the 1963 papal conclave that selected Pope Paul VI. He served as the papal legate to the fourth centennial celebration of the arrival of the first Catholic missionaries to Macau on 10 November 1965.

He died in Rome at the age of 96. He was buried in the Campo Verano, but his remains, in accordance with his will, were later transferred to the church of Sant'Antonio dei Portoghesi. In his will, Nunes had also expressed his desire to be buried in the cemetery of Horta, next to his parents, if he died in Portugal.

== Trivia ==
- He founded the journal Oriente.
- He was named President of the Permanent Committee of International Eucharistic Congresses on 13 July 1953.

Catholic Church titles
Preceded by João de Azevedo e Castro	Bishop of Macau; 1920–1940	Succeeded by João de Deus Ramalho
Preceded by Teotónio Emanuel Ribeiro Vieira de Castro	Patriarch of the East Indies; 1940–1953	Succeeded by José Vieira Alvernaz
Records
Preceded by Paolo Giobbe	Oldest living Member of the Sacred College; 4 August 1972 – 29 November 1976	Succeeded by Alberto di Jorio
