= List of people declared Servants of God under Pope Leo XIV =

This article is a list of people proposed by each diocese of the Catholic Church for beatification and canonization, whose causes have been officially opened during the papacy of Pope Leo XIV and are newly given the title as Servants of God. The names listed below are from the Vatican and are listed in chronological order beginning the year 2025, with their birth and death year, position in clerical or religious life, and the place where the potential Saints lived or died.

In the Latin Church of the Catholic Church, Servant of God is a title used for a person for whom a beatification process has been opened.

== 2025 ==
Name	Born	Died	Country	Diocese	Cause	Rescript of "Nihil Obstat"	Opening Date	Notes
Gaetano Nicosia	3 April 1915	6 November 2017	Italy; Macau	Macau	Heroic Virtues	21 May 2025	17 January 2026	Professed Priest, Salesians of Don Bosco
Maria Adelgund Tumińska	24 July 1894	15 February 1945	Poland	Pelplin	Martyr in odium fidei	6 June 2025	2 February 2026	Professed Religious, Franciscan Sisters of Penance and Christian Charity
Vittorina Gementi	17 February 1931	3 June 1989	Italy	Mantua	Heroic Virtues	---	15 July 2025	Layperson, Founder, Casa del Sole
Manuel Foderà	21 June 2001	20 July 2010	Italy	Trapani	Heroic Virtues	1 August 2025	16 June 2026	Child
Jorge Cristian Pérez	28 September 1977	6 March 2000	Argentina	Avellaneda-Lanús	Heroic Virtues	---	12 August 2025	Young Layperson
Antonio Musumeci	15 December 1899	14 August 1943	Italy	Messina-Lipari-Santa Lucia del Mela	Martyr in odium fidei	1 September 2025	10 January 2026	Priest
Antonio Gamboa López	10 April 1912	21 October 2004	Spain	Málaga	Heroic Virtues	---	2 September 2025	Priest
Pedro Shaw	6 September 1925	21 June 1984	Belgium; Paraguay	Asunción	Heroic Virtues	---	6 September 2025	Professed Priest, Missionary Oblates of Mary Immaculate; Titular Bishop of Crepedula; Apostolic Vicar of Pilcomayo
Ervin Gábor	24 January 1912	03 December 1944	Hungary	Esztergom-Budapest	Martyr in odium fidei	---	20 October 2025	Diocesan Priest

== 2026 ==
Name	Born	Died	Country	Diocese	Cause	Rescript of "Nihil Obstat"	Opening Date	Notes
Annai Scholastica	15 October 1917	12 October 1993	India	Vellore	Heroic Virtues	19 January 2026	10 May 2026	Professed Religious, Missionary Sisters of the Immaculate Heart of Mary; Founder, The Sisters of the Sacred Heart of Jesus
Adele Brice	30 January 1831	5 July 1896	Belgium; United States	Green Bay	Heroic Virtues	---	30 January 2026	Laywoman, Marian Visionary
Alfred Delp	15 September 1907	2 February 1945	Germany	Munich-Freising	Martyr in odium fidei	---	2 February 2026	Professed Priest, Jesuit
Ángel Ayala	1 March 1867	20 February 1960	Spain	Madrid	Heroic Virtues	---	20 February 2026	Professed Priest, Jesuit; Founder, Catholic Association of Propagandists
Luigi Maria Faccenda	24 August 1920	9 October 2005	Italy	Bologna	Heroic Virtues	---	19 March 2026	Professed Priest, Conventual Franciscans; Founder, Fr. Kolbe Missionaries of the Immaculata
Alberto Ibáñez Padilla	28 February 1928	9 September 2015	Argentina	Buenos Aires	Heroic Virtues	---	30 April 2026	Professed Priest, Jesuit; Founder, “Convivencia con Dios” Community
José Ramón Aristi	9 November 1899	6 April 1996	Argentina	Buenos Aires	Heroic Virtues	---	29 May 2026	Professed Priest, Congregation of the Blessed Sacrament
Ignacio Larrañaga	4 May 1928	28 October 2013	Spain; Mexico	Guadalajara	Heroic Virtues	---	6 October 2026	Professed Priest, Order of Friars Minor Capuchin; Founder, Prayer and Life Workshops
