= Gaspar Jorge de Leão Pereira =

Portuguese archbishop (died 1576)

Most Reverend Gaspar Jorge de Leão Pereira
- Archbishop of Goa
- Church: Catholic Church
- Diocese: Archdiocese of Goa
- In office: 1572–1576
- Predecessor: Jorge Temudo
- Successor: Henrique de Távora e Brito

Personal details
- Born: Lagos, Portugal
- Died: 15 August 1576 Goa, Portuguese India

Gaspar Jorge de Leão Pereira, or simply Gaspar de Leão Pereira or Gaspar de Leão (Lagos – Goa, 15 August 1576) was the first Archbishop of Goa.

After the diocese of Goa was elevated to an archdiocese, he was appointed Archbishop of Goa, Primate of the East in 1558 or 1559. He arrived in Portuguese India on 15 April 1560 to take possession of his charge. After seven years, in 1567, he renounced the position, and retired to the Franciscan convent, a few miles from Goa. He was succeeded by Jorge Temudo. On the latter's death in 1571, Gaspar returned to occupy the archdiocese, where he remained until his own death in 1576. José António Ismael Gracias points to several names of archbishops who marked the history of the printing press, including Gaspar de Leão Pereira, who is cited by the author as the "male doctor and virtuoso, presiding over the destinies of the archdiocese, also chaired the movement of these presses." However, this same author notes the existence of prior censorship of books that were printed: "We have seen that most of the books that we have made mention, were printed prior to censorship and licenses, including those of Archbishop Gaspar! ... What do these criticisms show up and licenses for books written by people of recognized letters and piety? If anything proves the power of the terrible Inquisition, the power that knew no bounds, and that extended up to shackle the mind and oppose the free expression of thought." (Gracias, p. 23).

He was also founder of the St. Paul's College in Goa, where printers were free and uncensored, in order to follow the intellectual movement. He is buried in the Se Cathedral, Goa, near the Altar of Saint José.

== Works by Gaspar de Leão ==
- Compendio spiritual da vida Christãa, etc., published in Goa by João de Quinquencio and João de Endem, 1561. Inocêncio Francisco da Silva said that it "seems to have been the first book that Sahira printed on presses of Goa."
- Tratado que fez Mestre Hieronimo, Medico do Papa Benedicto XIII, cõtra os judeus: ẽ que proua o Messias da ley ser vindo, (A tract against the Jews, etc.) Goa, co-written with Jerónimo Santa Fe and published by João de Endem, 1565.
- Desenganos de Perdidos (Disappointments of the Lost), Goa, published by João de Endem, 1573. This latter work is mentioned among the books prohibited by the Index Expurgatorius from 1581: the Portuguese Inquisition thought that this book could not run.

== See also ==
- Relic of the tooth of the Buddha, Gaspar is said to have destroyed the relic or a copy of it
- Relics associated with Buddha § Relics in Sri Lanka
- Constantino of Braganza § Tooth relic

Catholic Church titles
Preceded by João de Albuquerque	Archbishop of Goa; 1558–1567	Succeeded by Jorge Temudo
Preceded by Jorge Temudo	Archbishop of Goa; 1572–1576	Succeeded by Henrique de Távora e Brito
