= Anthony Alwyn Fernandes Barreto =

Indian bishop

Most Reverend / Right Reverend Anthony Alwyn Fernandes Barreto
- Bishop Emeritus of Sindhudurg
- Archdiocese: Goa and Daman
- Diocese: Sindhudurg
- Appointed: 5 July 2005
- Successor: Agnelo Pinheiro
- Other post: Chairman Youth Commission in Western Regions Bishops Conference
- Previous post: Dean of the Roman Catholic Diocese of Poona

Orders
- Ordination: 13 October 1979 by Bishop Valerian D’Souza
- Consecration: 5 Oct 2005 by Pedro López Quintana

Personal details
- Born: 22 December 1952 (age 73) Goa, Portuguese India
- Denomination: Roman Catholic
- Residence: Bishop's House, Kankavli District Sindhudurg - 416 602 Maharastra, India
- Motto: GROW INTO THE FULLNESS OF CHRIST

Bishop Anthony Alwyn Fernandes Barreto (born 22 December 1952) was serving bishop of the Roman Catholic Diocese of Sindhudurg. He is currently Bishop Emeritus of the same see.

== Early life ==
Barreto was born in Goa on 22 December 1952.

== Priesthood ==
Barreto was ordained a Catholic priest on 13 October 1979 by Bishop Valerian D’Souza.

== Episcopate ==
He was appointed bishop of Roman Catholic Diocese of Sindhudurg on 5 July 2005 and ordained on 5 Oct 2005 by Pedro López Quintana. Before becoming a bishop he has served as the dean in the Roman Catholic Diocese of Poona. He chairs the Youth Commission in Western Regions Bishops Conference.

== Episcopal genealogy ==
Barreto's episcopal genealogy is:

- Cardinal Scipione Rebiba
- Cardinal Giulio Antonio Santori
- Cardinal Girolamo Bernerio, O.P.
- Archbishop Galeazzo Sanvitale
- Cardinal Ludovico Ludovisi
- Cardinal Luigi Caetani
- Cardinal Ulderico Carpegna
- Cardinal Paluzzo Paluzzi Altieri degli Albertoni
- Pope Benedict XIII
- Pope Benedict XIV
- Pope Clement XIII
- Cardinal Henry Benedict Stuart
- Pope Leo XII
- Cardinal Chiarissimo Falconieri Mellini
- Cardinal Camillo Di Pietro
- Cardinal Mieczysław Halka Ledóchowski
- Cardinal Jan Maurycy Paweł Puzyna de Kosielsko
- Archbishop Józef Bilczewski
- Archbishop Bolesław Twardowski
- Archbishop Eugeniusz Baziak
- Pope John Paul II
- Archbishop Pedro López Quintana
- Bishop Anthony Alwyn Fernandes Barreto

== See also ==
- Catholic Church in India
