= Raul Nicolau Gonçalves =

Indian Roman Catholic prelate (1927–2022)

His Beatitude Raul Nicolau Gonçalves
- Archbishop of Goa and Daman; Patriarch of the East Indies
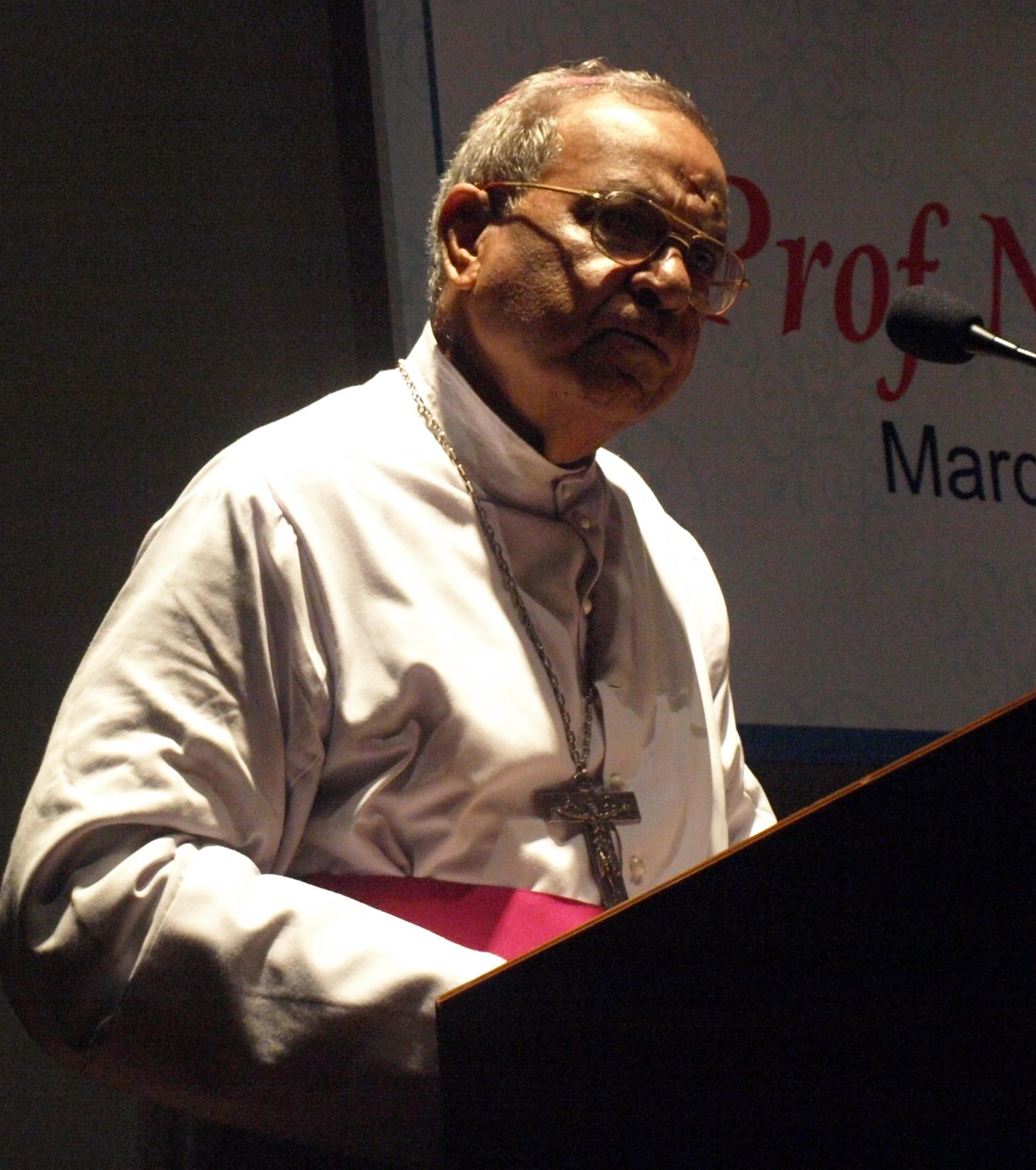
- Archbishop Gonçalves in 2010
- See: Goa and Daman
- Appointed: 30 January 1978
- Term ended: 12 December 2003
- Predecessor: José Vieira Alvernaz
- Successor: Filipe Neri Ferrão
- Other post: Patriarch of the East Indies (1978–2003)
- Previous posts: Auxiliary Bishop of Goa e Damão (1967–1978); Titular Bishop of Rapidum (1967–1978)

Orders
- Ordination: 21 December 1950
- Consecration: 5 March 1967 by Cardinal James Knox

Personal details
- Born: Raul Nicolau Gonçalves; 15 June 1927 Bambolim, Goa, Portuguese India
- Died: 1 July 2022 (aged 95) Porvorim, Goa, India
- Denomination: Roman Catholic

Raul Nicolau Gonçalves (Note: The last name is also spelled Gonsalves.) (15 June 1927 – 1 July 2022) was an Indian prelate. He was the first Goan catholic to be Archbishop of Goa and Patriarch of the East Indies.

He was the archbishop emeritus of Goa. The current Archbishop and Cardinal-Elect Archbishop Filip Neri Ferrao served the Archdiocese of Goa and Daman, as auxiliary bishop, to Raul Nicolau, for about ten years, from 1994 to 2004.

== Biography ==
Raul Nicolau was born in Bambolim, Tiswadi, and studied at Rachol and later at the Pontifical Urban University in Rome. He was ordained in the diocese of Goa and Daman on 21 December 1950. On 5 January 1967, he was appointed titular bishop of Rapidum, Apostolic Administrator of the archdiocese, and auxiliary bishop of Goa and Daman.

== Named Archbishop ==
On 30 January 1978, Pope Paul VI through the papal bull Quoniam Archidioecesi named him Archbishop of Goa and Patriarch of the East Indies (and therefore Primate of the East and Titular Archbishop of Cranganore). He retired 16 January 2004, after reaching 75 years of age the compulsory retirement age, in conformity with the 1983 Code of Canon Law canon 401 § 1.

He was consecrated by Cardinal James Robert Knox. He also was the principal consecrant of Dom Filipe Neri António Sebastião do Rosário Ferrão and the co-consecrating bishop was Aleixo das Neves Dias, SFX.

== Other achievements ==
He was one of the members of the Commission constituted by then-Archbishop-Patriarch, Dom José Vieira Alvernaz for the establishment of Caritas Goa on 3 January 1962 through Portaria No. 2-62.

He is credited with being the moving spirit, as the then-Apostolic Administrator, for the setting up of the Diocesan Family Service Centre of the Archdiocese of Goa and Daman in 1975. Gonçalves "felt the need to establish it, during a very critical time where family life was threatened by the then powers-to-be especially when Emergency was declared and forced sterilization was in vogue as part of controlling the population."

The Archdiocese of Goa and Daman's website credits him with being the "first Goan to be appointed Archbishop of Goa and Daman, and Patriarch of the East Indies."

Gonçalves has been a member of the Vatican's Pontifical Council for the Pastoral Care of Migrants and Itinerant People.

Gonçalves assumed the helm of the Goan Church amidst a changing political situation. After Portuguese rule in Goa was ended by Indian military action, the Portuguese Archbishop-Patriarch Alvernaz left for Portugal and retired to his home in the Azores but remained the formal Patriarch of Goa till his resignation in 1975. From December 1963 the Archdiocese of Goa was governed by its first Indian Bishop, Msgr. Francisco da Piedade Rebello, as Apostolic Administrator. Beginning in 1967 he was assisted by Gonçalves as Auxiliary Bishop. Gonçalves succeeded him as an Apostolic Administrator in 1972. After 1975, when Portugal recognised the end of their rule in Goa following a change of leadership in Lisbon, Bishop Gonçalves became the first Goan to actually become the Archbishop-Patriarch of Goa, in 1978.

With his appointment, it was argued that "for the first time... Goa's Roman Catholic patriarch is a Goan". Prior to this "the appointee for centuries was Portuguese."

== Death ==
After his retirement, Archbishop Emeritus kept a low profile, confining himself to pastoral works. He died on 1 July 2022 at JMJ Hospital in Goa where he had been hospitalised for the last 10 days. He celebrated his 95th birthday on 15 June 2022 and shepherded the Archdiocese of Goa and Daman for 37 long years as its Archbishop and Patriarch of the East Indies.

== See also ==
- In partibus infidelium

== Notes ==
Catholic Church titles
Preceded by José Vieira Alvernaz	Patriarch of the East Indies; 1978–2003	Succeeded by Filipe Neri António Sebastião do Rosário Ferrão
Preceded by José Vieira Alvernaz	Archbishop of Goa and Daman; 1978–2003	Succeeded by Filipe Neri António Sebastião do Rosário Ferrão
Preceded by Post created	Titular Bishop of Rapidum; 1967–1968	Succeeded by Gyula Szakos
Preceded by —	Auxiliary Bishop of Goa e Damão; 1967–1968	Succeeded by —
