= Teotónio Emanuel Ribeiro Vieira de Castro =

Portuguese Roman Catholic prelate (1859-1940)

The Most Reverend Teotónio Emanuel Ribeiro Vieira de Castro
- Archbishop of Goa and Daman
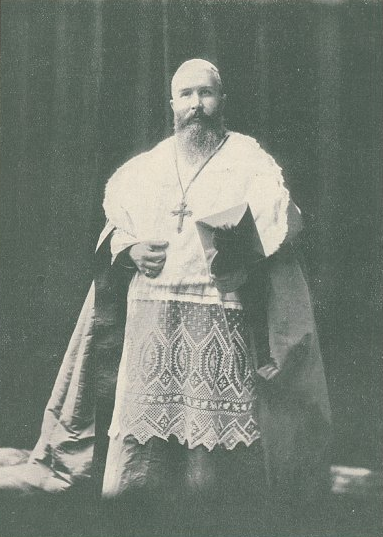
- Archdiocese: Roman Catholic Archdiocese of Goa and Daman
- Diocese: Roman Catholic Archdiocese of Goa and Daman
- See: Goa and Daman
- Appointed: 25 May 1929
- Predecessor: Mateus de Oliveira Xavier
- Successor: José da Costa Nunes

Orders
- Ordination: 8 April 1882
- Consecration: 15 August 1899 by Bishop António José de Souza Barroso

Personal details
- Born: 27 July 1859 Porto, Portugal
- Died: May 16, 1940 (aged 80) Goa, India

Teotónio Emanuel Ribeiro Vieira de Castro was a Roman Catholic prelate who served as the Archbishop of the Archdiocese of Goa e Damão, India and Patriarch of the East Indies from 1929 to 1940.

== Early life ==
Castro was born in Porto, Portugal on 27 July 1859.

== Priesthood ==
On 8 April 1882, Castro was ordained a catholic priest.

== Episcopate ==
Castro was appointed bishop of the Diocese of São Tomé of Meliapore and consecrated as a bishop by Bishop António José de Souza Barroso on 15 August 1899, in Porto.

On 25 May 1929, he was appointed Archbishop and Patriarch of East Indies of Goa e Damão, India.

== Death ==
Castro died on 16 May 1940.
