= Roman Catholic Archdiocese of Goa and Daman =

Roman Catholic archdiocese in Goa and Damaon, India

Metropolitan Archdiocese of Goa and Daman Archidioecesis Goanae et Damanensis Gõy ani Damanv Mha-Dhormprant ગોવા અને દમણનું આર્કડાયોસીસ

Catholic
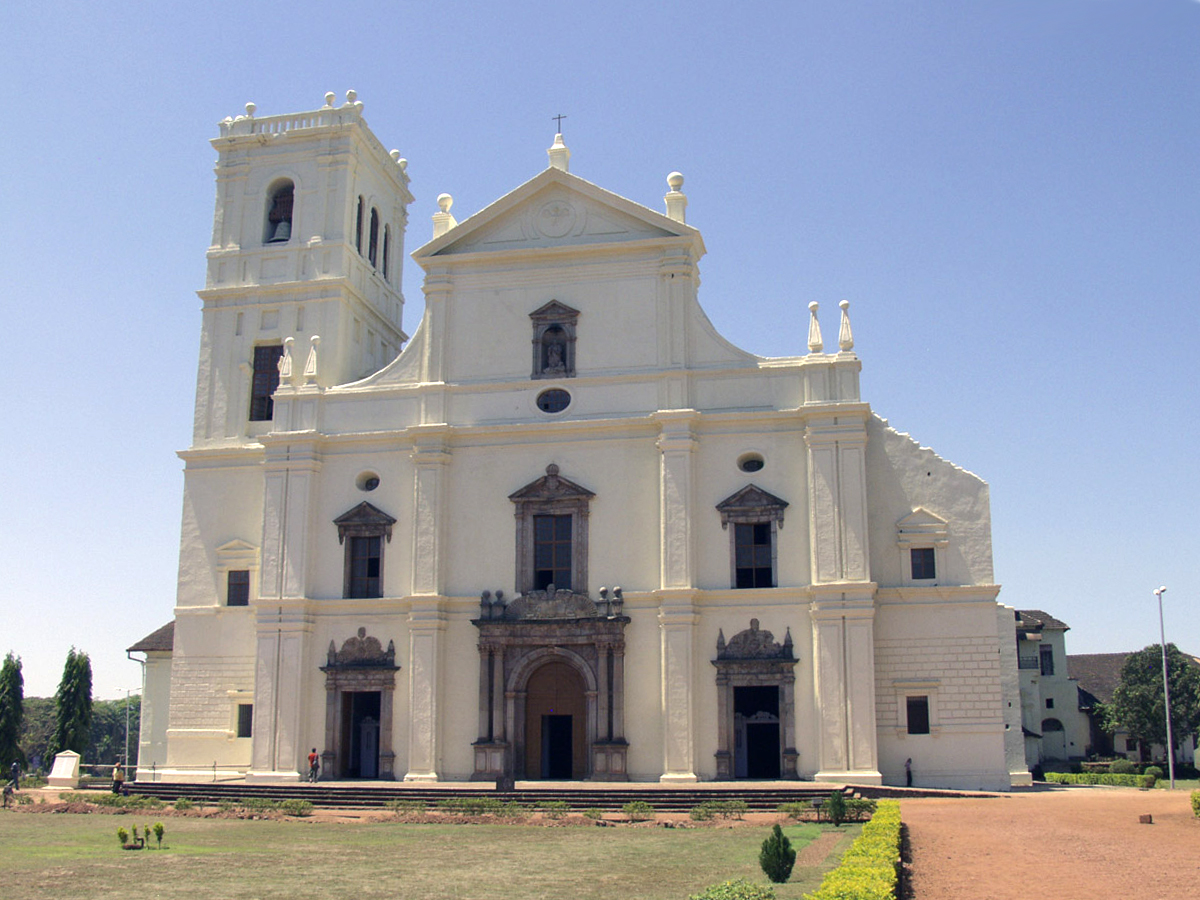
- The Sé Catedral de Santa Catarina in Old Goa

Location
- Country: India
- Ecclesiastical province: Goa and Daman
- Coordinates: 15°30′08″N 73°54′42″E

Statistics
- Area: 4,194 km^{2} (1,619 sq mi)
- Population: Total; Catholics: (as of 2013); 1,600,000; 620,570 (35.2%)
- Parishes: 167

Information
- Denomination: Roman Catholic
- Rite: Latin Rite
- Cathedral: Cathedral of St Catherine of Alexandria in Old Goa
- Patron saint: Saint Joseph Vaz
- Secular priests: 701
- Language: Konkani, English, Marathi, Portuguese, Gujarati, Hindi

Current leadership
- Pope: Leo XIV
- Metropolitan Archbishop: Filipe Neri Ferrão
- Suffragan: Diocese of Sindhudurg
- Auxiliary Bishops: Simião Purificação Fernandes

Website
- https://archgoadaman.com/

The Roman Catholic Metropolitan Archdiocese of Goa and Daman (Latin: Archidioecesis Goanae et Damanensis, Goan Konkani: Gõy ani Damanv Mha-Dhormprant, Portuguese: Arquidiocese de Goa e Damão, Gujarati: ગોવા અને દમણનું આર્કડાયોસીસ), encompasses the Goa state and the Damaon territory in the Konkan region, by the west coast of India. The ecclesiastical province of Goa and Damaon includes a suffragan diocese, the Sindhudurg Diocese that comprises the Malvani areas of (central Konkan). The Archbishop of Goa also holds the titles of Primate of the East and Patriarch of the East Indies. The beginnings lie in the Padroado system of Portuguese Goa and Damaon, in the early 1900s the primatial see was transferred back to the Sacred Congregation for the Evangelisation of Peoples, as the Padroado system of the Indo-Portuguese era was being dismantled.

It is the oldest bishopric of the Latin Rite of worship in terms of activity in the East Indies, with its origins linked to the Portuguese discoveries, and their subsequent arrival at the St Mary's islands and Calicut, on the coast of the Malabar region.

The current Metropolitan Archbishop and Patriarch of the East Indies is Filipe Neri Ferrão.

== Special churches ==
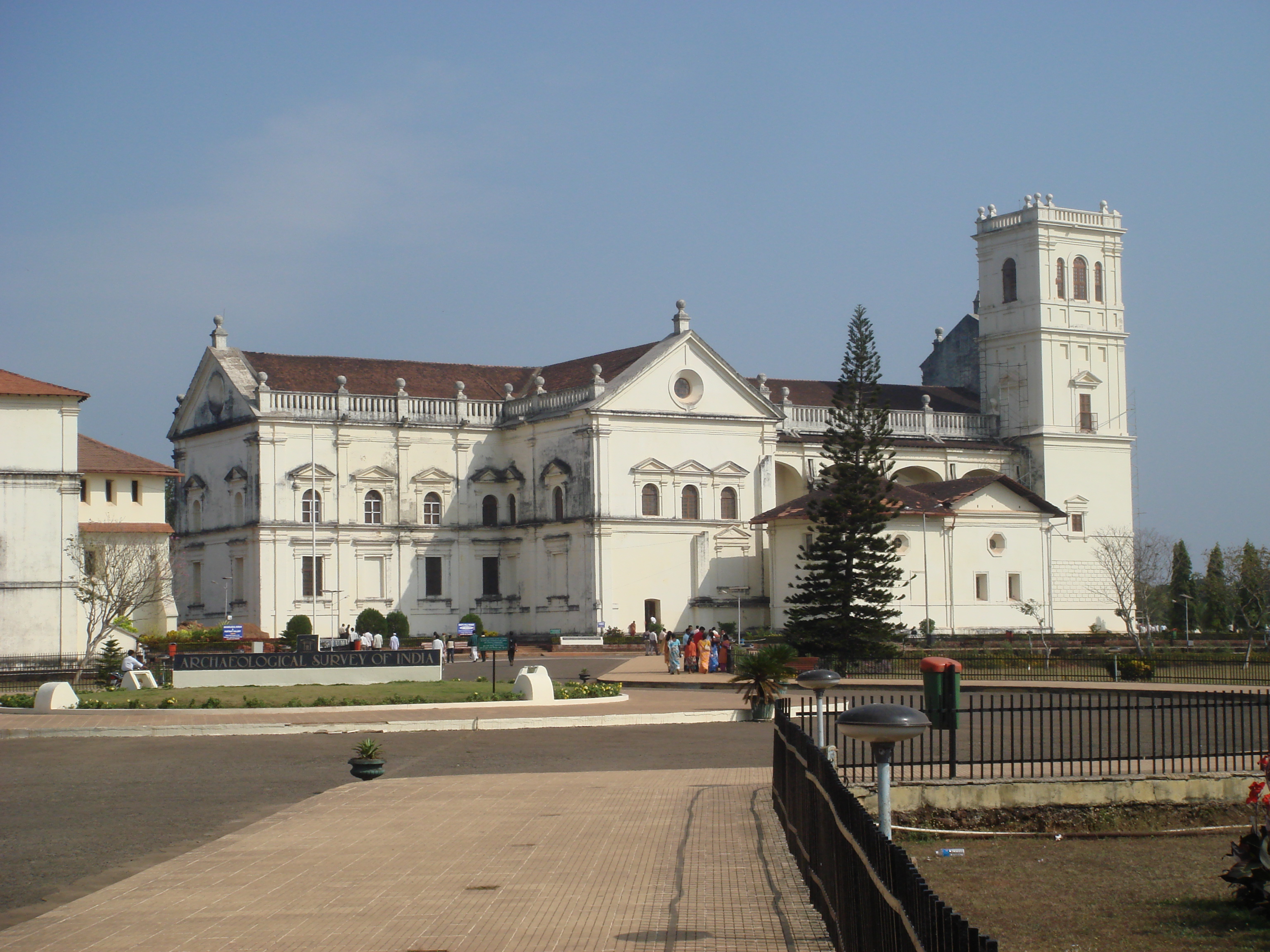
Cathedral of St Catherine, Goa

- The archbishop's cathedral see, the Se Cathedral, or Sé Catedral de Santa Catarina, is in the city of Old Goa, Goa.
- The diocese also has a minor basilica, the Basilica of Bom Jesus in Old Goa. The World Heritage Site composed of the Churches and Convents of Goa falls under its ecclesiastical jurisdiction.
- The former Cathedral of Bom Jesus of the now-suppressed Diocese of Daman in Daman

== Territory and statistics ==
The archdiocese consists of the State of Goa and the union territory of Dadra and Nagar Haveli and Daman and Diu in India. As of 2014, it pastorally served 641,231 Catholics (31.0% of 2,067,200 total) on 4,194 km^{2} in 167 parishes and 124 missions with 715 priests (410 diocesan, 305 religious), 1,503 lay religious (538 brothers, 965 sisters) and 80 seminarians.

== Ecclesiastical province ==
The Metropolitan has a single suffragan see:

- Roman Catholic Diocese of Sindhudurg, which includes the districts of Sindhudurg, Ratnagiri and Kolhapur in Maharashtra state, except the St. Francis Xavier parish in the city of Kolhapur. It was created on 5 July 2005, when its territory was split off from the Roman Catholic Diocese of Poona. It was a suffragan diocese of the Archdiocese of Bombay until 25 November 2006, when Pope Benedict XVI transferred it to the newly established metropolitan province of Goa and Damão. Between 1975 and 2006 the Archbishop of Goa and Damão, having no suffragan, was not entitled to wear the pallium.

== History ==
After the Portuguese conquest of Goa by Afonso de Albuquerque in 1510, King Manuel I built a chapel there in honour of St. Catherine, named patron of the city in 1518. Christians in the region were given into the charge of Dom Duarte Nunes OP, the Franciscan bishop of the titular see of Laodicea. He governed until 1527 when he was succeeded by Dom Fernando Vaqueiro OFM, the Franciscan titular bishop of Aureopolis, from 1529 to 1535.

King John III of Portugal commissioned the construction of a cathedral in Goa and Pope Clement VII founded the Diocese of Goa on 31 January 1533, with the papal bull titled Romani Pontificis Circumspectio. The jurisdiction of the new diocese at the time stretched from the Cape of Good Hope to China and Japan. On 3 November 1534 the creation of the diocese was confirmed by the Aequum reputamus bull of Pope Paul III, since Clement VII's death had prevented the publication of its establishment. The diocese was originally a suffragan of the diocese of Funchal.

At the request of King Sebastian, on 4 February 1558 Pope Paul IV separated the Goan diocese from the ecclesiastical province of Lisbon and raised it to a metropolitan archdiocese, with the suffragan dioceses of Cochin and Malacca. In the course of time other dioceses were included in the metropolitan area of Goa: Macau, Funai in Japan, Cranganore and Meliapor in India, Nanjing and Beijing in China, and Mozambique in Africa. Daman in India is still included in Goa.

With the brief of 13 December 1572 Pope Gregory XIII granted the archbishop of Goa the title of Primate of the East. This is because the diocese of Goa was the first diocese of the Padroado in Asia. By 1857, Goa had gained several suffragan dioceses in the Indian subcontinent but retained only Macau and Mozambique outside that geographical area.

On 23 January 1886, Pope Leo XIII, through the bull Humanae Salutis Auctor, invested the archbishop of Goa with the honorary title of Patriarch of the East Indies. With the same bull, the diocese of Daman was established, to which was attached the title of the Archdiocese of Cranganore, that had been suppressed by the 24 April 1838 Multa praeclare decree of Pope Gregory XVI. These provisions had already been made in the concordat between the Holy See and Portugal on 23 June 1886. The honorary title of patriarch recognised the primacy of honour of the archbishop of Goa among all the bishops of the East and the historical vastness of his jurisdiction, at a time when his jurisdiction was reduced. He also enjoyed the privilege of presiding over all the synods of the East Indies

When the diocese of Daman was dissolved on 1 May 1928 with Inter Apostolicam, the title of Cranganore was attached to the Goa archdiocese. Thus, the archbishop of Goa came to be the titular archbishop of Cranganore.

Goan Catholics distribution across India.

In 1940, Dili (in East Timor) was elevated to a diocese and placed as suffragan under Goa; Mozambique was in the same year spun off from the metropolitan archdiocese. In 1953 the archdiocese of Goa lost the suffragan dioceses of Cochin, Meliampor and Canara following the ecclesiastical territorial reorganisation of the new Indian state.

On 19 December 1961, the Indian Union annexed the territories of Goa, and Daman and Diu. The following year the Patriarch Archbishop José Vieira Alvernaz left the territory. In 1965, the religious jurisdiction of Diu was entrusted to the Missionary Society of St Francis Xavier. The complexities of annexing Portuguese-ruled territories meant that the Vatican did not accept the resignation of the last patriarch until 1975. The dioceses of Dili and Macau were also de-linked from the ecclesiastical province and placed directly under the Holy See.

With the Quoniam Archdioecesi bull of 30 January 1978, Pope Paul VI appointed Bishop Raul Nicolau Gonçalves as Archbishop of Goa and Daman, also titled ad honorem Patriarch of the East Indies. By Inter Capital of 12 December 2003, Pope John Paul II appointed Rev. Filipe Neri Ferrao Archbishop of Goa and Daman, also granting him the honorary patriarch title.

The Archdiocese of Goa and Daman remained—until 25 November 2006—as just an archdiocese, since the archdiocese had had no suffragan dioceses since 1 January 1975, when Macao and Dili were separated from it. On 25 November 2006, Pope Benedict XVI with Cum Christi Evangelii made the diocese of Sindhudurg a suffragan of Goa and Daman, together with which it formed a new ecclesiastical province.

The civil district of North Kanara (Uttara Kannada) was part of the Roman Catholic Archdiocese of Goa and Daman till 19 September 1953 when the New Roman Catholic Diocese of Belgaum was erected. Two civil districts, Belgaum and North Kanara, were separated from the Archdiocese of Goa and two other civil districts, Dharwad and Bijapur, were taken from the Diocese of Poona to form the Diocese of Belgaum.

- 31 January 1533: Archdiocese of Goa established from the Diocese of Funchal
- 4 February 1557: Diocese of Cochin established as a suffragan diocese
- 4 February 1558: Established suffragan diocese – Diocese of Malacca
- 4 February 1558: Promoted to Metropolitan Archdiocese of Goa
- 1 May 1928: Renamed Metropolitan Archdiocese of Goa and Daman
- 1 January 1976: Demoted to Archdiocese of Goa and Daman
- 25 November 2006: Promoted to Metropolitan Archdiocese of Goa and Daman

== Episcopal ordinaries ==
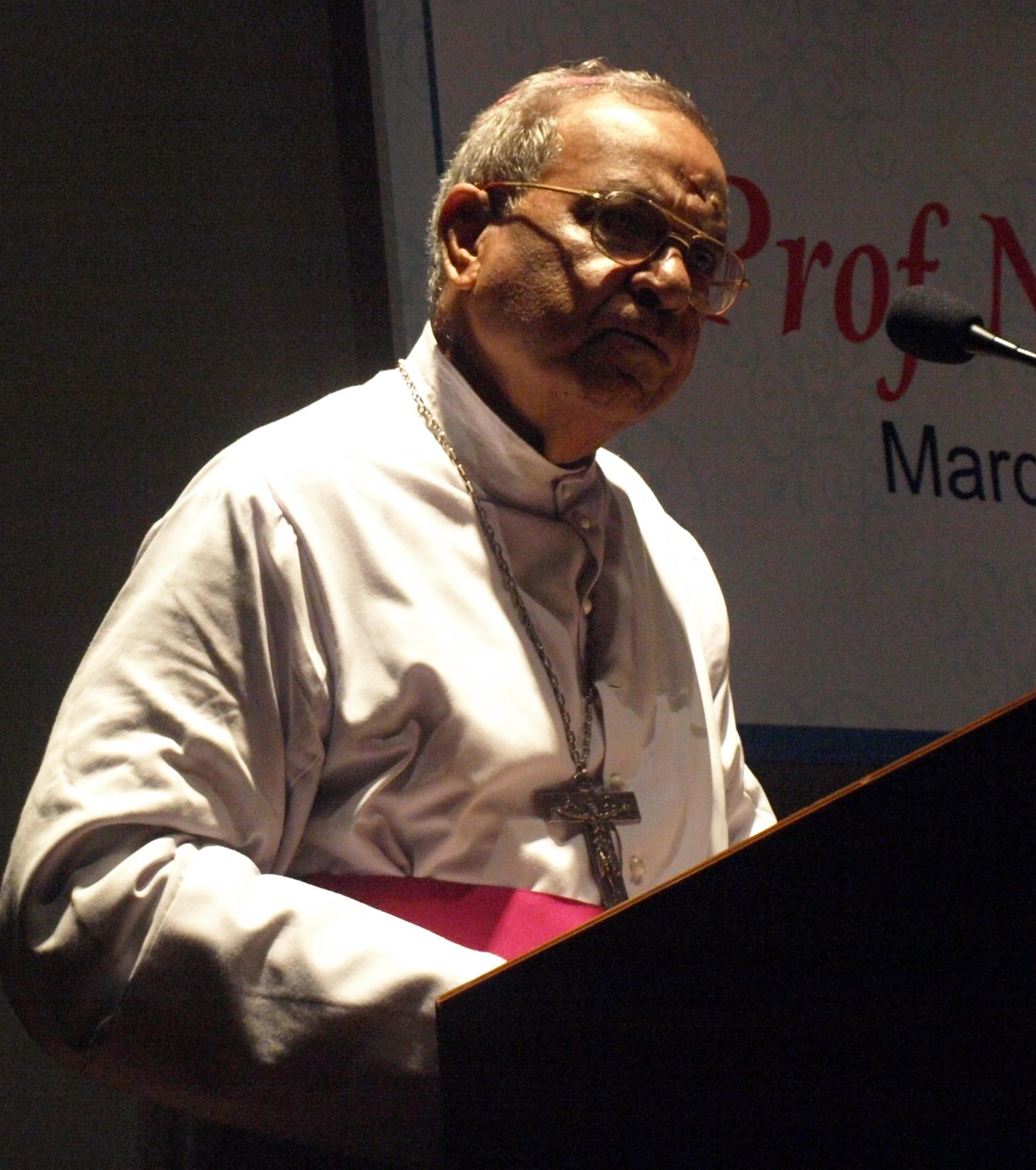
Dom Raul Nicolau Gonçalves, first Goan Patriarch of the East Indies and Archbishop of Goa and Daman

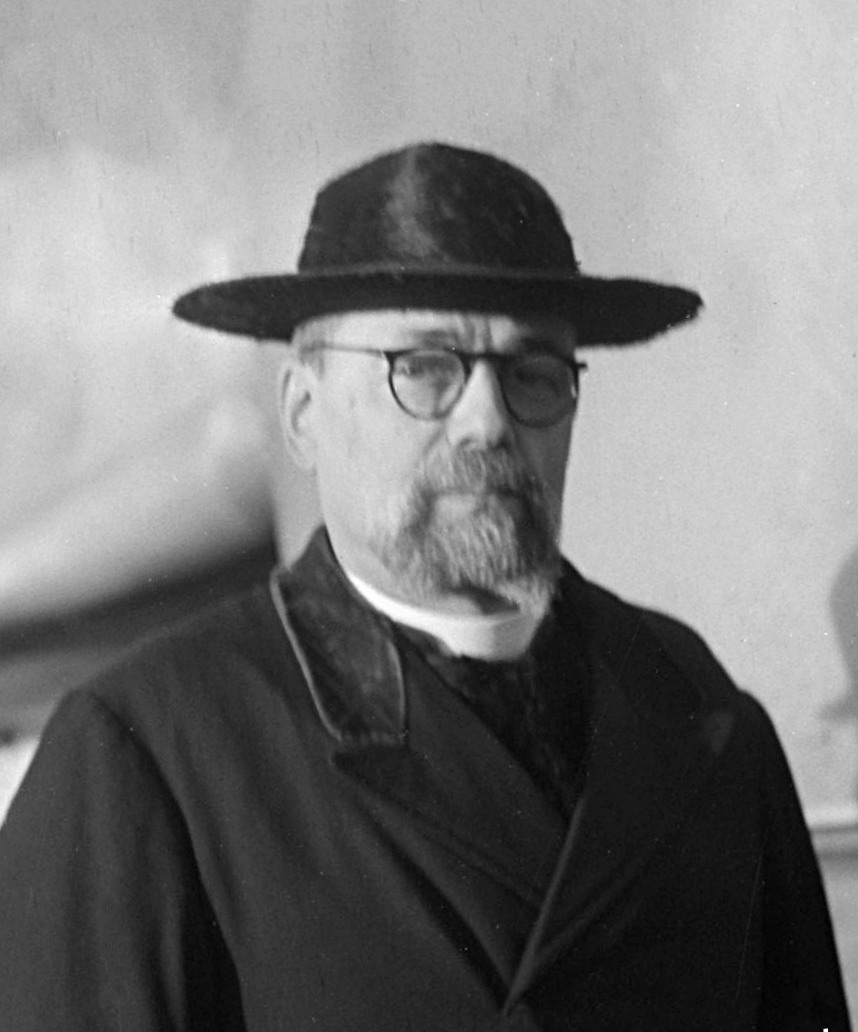
Dom José da Costa Nunes, Archbishop of Goa and Daman, later Cardinal.

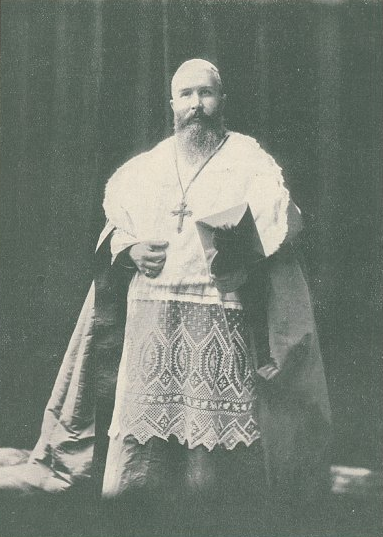
Dom Teotónio Manuel Ribeiro Vieira de Castro

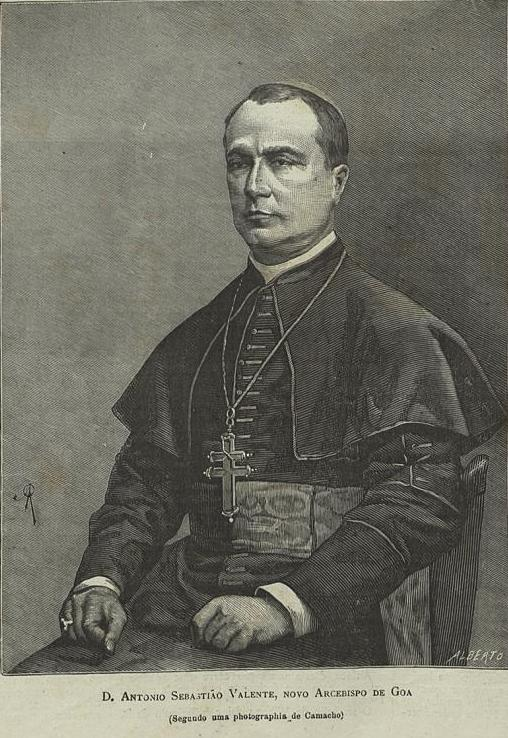
Dom Sebastião António Valente, first Patriarch of the East Indies.

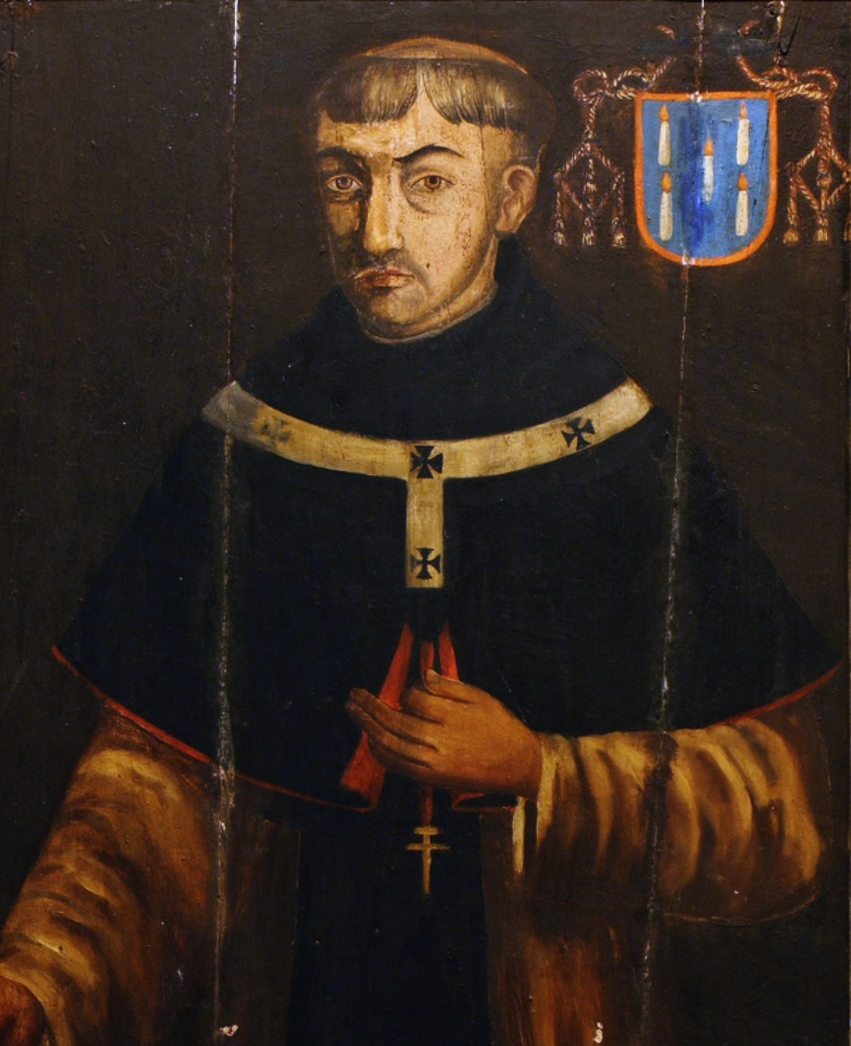
Dom António Brandão, Archbishop of Goa, interim Governor-General of Portuguese India

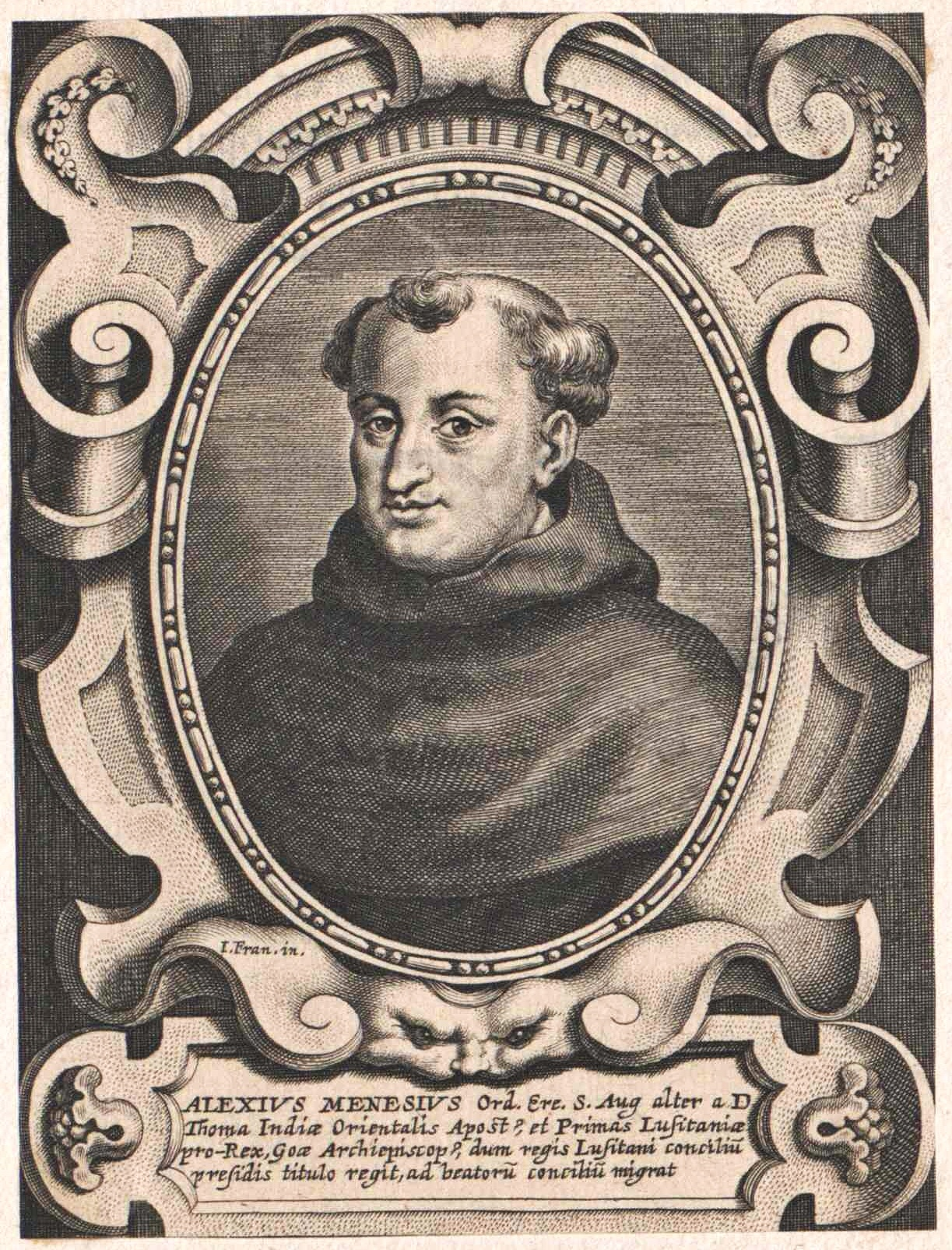
Dom Aleixo de Menezes, Archbishop of Goa, later archbishop of Braga and viceroy of Portugal.

	Name	Periods	Notes
Archbishops
34º	Filipe Neri do Rosário Ferrão	2004–present	Second Goan Patriarch of the East Indies and Archbishop of Goa and Daman
33º	Raul Nicolau Gonçalves	1978–2004	First Goan Patriarch of the East Indies and Archbishop of Goa and Daman
32º	José Vieira Alvernaz	1953–1975	Last Archbishop of Portuguese period Former Bishop Of Cochin
-	José Vieira Alvernaz	1950-1953	Archbishop-coadjutor
31º	José da Costa Nunes	1940–1953	Later Cardinal
30º	Teotónio Manuel Ribeiro Vieira de Castro	1929–1940	
29º	Mateus de Oliveira Xavier	1909–1929	
28º	António Sebastião Valente	1882-1908	first Patriarch of the East Indies
27º	Aires de Ornelas e Vasconcelos	1875-1880	
26º	João Crisóstomo de Amorim Pessoa	1862-1874	Later archbishop of Braga
25º	José Maria da Silva Torres	1844-1851	
24º	Frei Manuel de São Galdino, O.F.M.	1812-1831	
-	Frei Manuel de São Galdino, O.F.M.	1804-1812	Archbishop-coadjutor
23º	Frei Manuel de Santa Catarina, O.C.D.	1784-1812	
22º	Frei Francisco da Assunção e Brito, O.S.A.	1773-1783	
21º	António Taveira da Neiva Brum da Silveira	1750-1773	
20º	Frei Lourenço de Santa Maria e Melo, O.F.M.	1741-1750	Later archbishop-bishop of Faro
19º	Frei Eugénio de Trigueiros, O.S.A.	1741	Died before taking office.
18º	Frei Inácio de Santa Teresa, O.S.A.	1721-1740	
17º	Sebastião de Andrade Pessanha	1715-1721	
16º	Frei Agostinho da Anunciação, O.C.	1690-1713	
15º	Frei Alberto de São Gonçalo da Silva, O.S.A.	1686-1688	
14º	Manoel de Sousa e Menezes	1680-1684	
13º	Frei António Brandão, O.C.	1674-1678	
12º	Frei Cristóvão da Silveira, O.S.A.	1670-1673	
11º	Frei Francisco dos Mártires, O.F.M.	1635-1652	
10º	Frei Manuel Teles de Brito, O.P.	1631-1633	
9º	Frei Sebastião de São Pedro, O.S.A.	1624-1629	
8º	Frei Cristóvão de Sá e Lisboa, O.S.H.	1612-1622	
7º	Frei Aleixo de Meneses O.S.A.	1595-1612	Later archbishop of Braga and viceroy of Portugal
6º	Frei Mateus de Medina, O. Carm.	1588-1593	
5º	Frei João Vicente da Fonseca, O.P.	1583-1586	
4º	Frei Henrique de Távora e Brito, O.P.	1578-1581	
3º	Gaspar Jorge de Leão Pereira	1571-1576	reappointed
2º	Frei Jorge Temudo, O.P.	1567-1571	
1º	Gaspar Jorge de Leão Pereira	1558-1567	
Bishops
-	Filipe do Rosário Ferrão	1993-2004	Auxiliary Bishop
-	Raul Nicolau Gonçalves	1967-1978	Auxiliary Bishop
-	Francisco Xavier da Piedade Rebelo	1963-1966	Auxiliary bishop, apostolic administrator sede plena between 1966 and 1972.
-	António Joaquim de Medeiros	1882-1884	Auxiliary Bishop after bishop of Macau
-	Tomás Gomes de Almeida	1879-1883	Auxiliary Bishop
-	Joaquim de Santa Rita Botelho	1851 - ????	Bishop of Cochin, head vicar and governor of Goa archbishop
-	Pedro da Silva	1688-1690	Bishop of Cochin, as Apostolic Administrator
-	Frei Miguel da Cruz Rangel, O.P.	1634-1635	Bishop of Cochin, as Apostolic Administrator
-	Frei João da Rocha, S.J.	1630-1631	titular bishop of Hierapolis in Phrygia, as Apostolic Administrator
-	Domingos Torrado, O.E.S.A.	1605-1612	Auxiliary Bishop, titular bishop of Fisicula
-	Diego da Conceição de Araújo, O.E.S.A.	1595-1597	Auxiliary Bishop, titular bishop of Calama
-	André de Santa Maria, O.F.M.	1593-1595	Bishop of Cochin, as Apostolic Administrator
-	Jorge de Santa Luzia, O.P.	1559-1560	Bishop of Malacca, as Apostolic Administrator
2º	Frei João de Albuquerque, O.F.M.	1539-1553	First resident bishop of Goa
1º	Francisco de Melo	1533-1536	First bishop of Goa, did not take possession.
Priests and friars as administrators
-	António João de Ataíde	1839-1844	priest
-	António Feliciano de Santa Rita Carvalho	1837-1839	head vicar and governor of the archbishopric of Goa
-	Paulo António Dias da Conceição	1835-1837	priest, Cathedral administrator
-	José Paulo da Costa Pereira de Almeida	1831-1835	priest, Dean of the Cathedral
-	Gonçalo Veloso	1629 - 1630	head vicar
-	Frei Domingos Torrado (also Domingos Terrado or Domingos da Trinidade)	1612	governor

== Saints and causes for canonisation ==
- St. Bartholomew
- St. Francis Xavier evangelised in Goa and his body is in the state.
- St. Joseph Vaz was a native of Benaulim.
- The Martyrs of Cuncolim
  - Bl. Rodolfo Acquaviva
  - Bl. Alphonsus Pacheco
  - Bl. Peter Berno
  - Bl. Anthony Francis
  - Bl. Francis Aranha
- Some of the 205 Martyrs of Japan
  - Bl. Miguel de Carvalho, ordained a priest in Goa
  - Bl. Francisco Pacheco, seminarian in Goa
  - Bl. John Baptist Zola, missionary in Goa
  - Bl. Balthasar de Torres, seminarian in Goa
  - Bl. Diogo Carvalho (Didacus Carvalho), seminarian in Goa
  - Bl. Pietro Paolo Navarra, ordained a priest in Goa
  - Bl. Joao Batisto Machado, seminarian in Goa
- Bls. Denis of the Nativity (Pierre Berthelot) and Redemptus of the Cross (Tomás Rodrigues da Cunha)
- Bl. Emmanuel d'Abreu, SJ
- Ven. Agnelo de Souza
- Ven. Matteo Ricci, SJ, scholar in Goa 1578-1582
- Fr. Jácome Gonsalves

== See also ==
- List of Roman Catholic dioceses in India
- Patriarch of the East Indies
- Christianity in India
- Roman Catholicism in India
- List of Roman Catholic dioceses (structured_view)-Episcopal Conference of India
- List of parishes of the Roman Catholic Archdiocese of Goa and Daman
- Goan Catholics
- Francis Xavier

== Sources and external links ==
- List of Indian Sees, from the Catholic Bishops Conference of India site
- Data of the Archdiocese, from the UCAN site
- Cheney, David M. "Archdiocese of Goa e Damão". Catholic-Hierarchy.org. (for Chronology of Bishops) ^{[self-published]}
- Chow, Gabriel. "Metropolitan Archdiocese of Goa and Daman (India)". GCatholic.org. (for Chronology of Bishops) ^{[self-published]}
- Official site of the Archdiocese of Goa and Daman

Bibliography

- (in Portuguese) Conselho Ultramarino. Annaes do Conselho Ultramarino. Lisboa Imprensa Nacional, 1867. Capítulo: Ásia.
- (in Portuguese) Aleixo de Menezes. id=UPEqJWspkDIC Synodo Diocesano da Igreia e Bispado de Angamale: dos antigos christaos de Sam Thome das Serras do Malauar das partes da India Oriental celebrado pello Reuerendissimo Senhor Dom Frey Aleixo de Menezes Arcebispo Metropolitano de Goa, Primaz da India et partes Orientaes, Coimbra: Officina de Diogo Gomez Loureyro, impressor da Universidade, 1606.
- (in Portuguese) Associação Maritima e Colonial. Annaes Maritimos e Coloniaes.
- (in Portuguese) Manoel José Gabriel Saldanha História de Goa: política e arqueológica. Asian Educational Services, 1990. ISBN 9788120605909
- (in Portuguese) Alexandre Herculano. A reacção ultramontana em Portugal: ou, A Concordata de 21 de fevereiro. Lisboa: Typographia de José Baptista Morando, 1857.
- (in Portuguese) Instituto Histórico, Geographico e Ethnographico do Brasil. Revista trimensal do Instituto Historico, Geographico e Ethnographico do Brasil Rio de Janeiro: B. L. Garnier, 1866. vol.29.
- (in Portuguese) Paiva, José Pedro. Os bispos de Portugal e do Império: 1495-1777 Coimbra: Universidade de Coimbra, 2006. ISBN 97-287-0485-2
- (in Spanish) Ángel Santos Hernández, S.J., Las misiones bajo el patronato portugués, Madrid 1977, pp. 116–117
- (in Latin) Konrad Eubel, Hierarchia Catholica Medii Aevi vol. 3, p. 204; vol. 4, pp. 195–196; vol. 5, p. 211; vol. 6, p. 227

Pontifical documents

- Aequum reputamus bull in Bullarium patronatus Portugalliae regum, v I, p148–152 (in Latin)
- Etsi Sancta bull in Bullarium patronatus Portugalliae regum, v I, pp.191–192 (in Latin)
- Humanae salutis bull (in Italian)
- Ad nominum bull, AAS 68 (1976), p. 307 (in Italian)
- Cum Christi Evangelii bull (1976) (in Latin)
- Ereção da nova Província Eclesiástica de Goa e Damão (in Portuguese)
