= João Afonso de Albuquerque (bishop) =

Most Reverend João Afonso de Albuquerque
- Bishop of Goa
- Church: Catholic Church
- Diocese: Diocese of Goa
- In office: 1537–1553
- Predecessor: Francisco de Melo
- Successor: Gaspar de Leão Pereira

Orders
- Consecration: 13 January 1538 by Diego de Ortiz de Vilhegas

Personal details
- Died: 28 February 1553

João Afonso de Albuquerque, O.F.M. was a Roman Catholic prelate who served as the first Bishop of Goa (1537–1553).

== Biography ==
João de Albuquerque was ordained a priest in the Order of Friars Minor. On 11 April 1537, he was appointed during the papacy of Pope Paul III as Bishop of Goa. On 13 January 1538, he was consecrated bishop in Lisbon by Diego de Ortiz de Vilhegas, Bishop of São Tomé e Príncipe, with Martinho de Portugal, Archbishop of Funchal, and Fernando de Menezes Coutinho e Vasconcellos, Bishop of Lamego, serving as co-consecrators. He served as Bishop of Goa until his death on 28 February 1553.

Catholic Church titles
Preceded by Francisco de Melo; Bishop-Elect	Bishop of Goa; 1537–1553	Succeeded by Gaspar de Leão Pereira
