= Diocese of Sindhudurg =

Catholic diocese in Maharashtra, India

Diocese of Sindhudurg Dioecesis Sindhudurgiensis Diocese de Sindhudurg सिंधुदुर्ग के सूबा
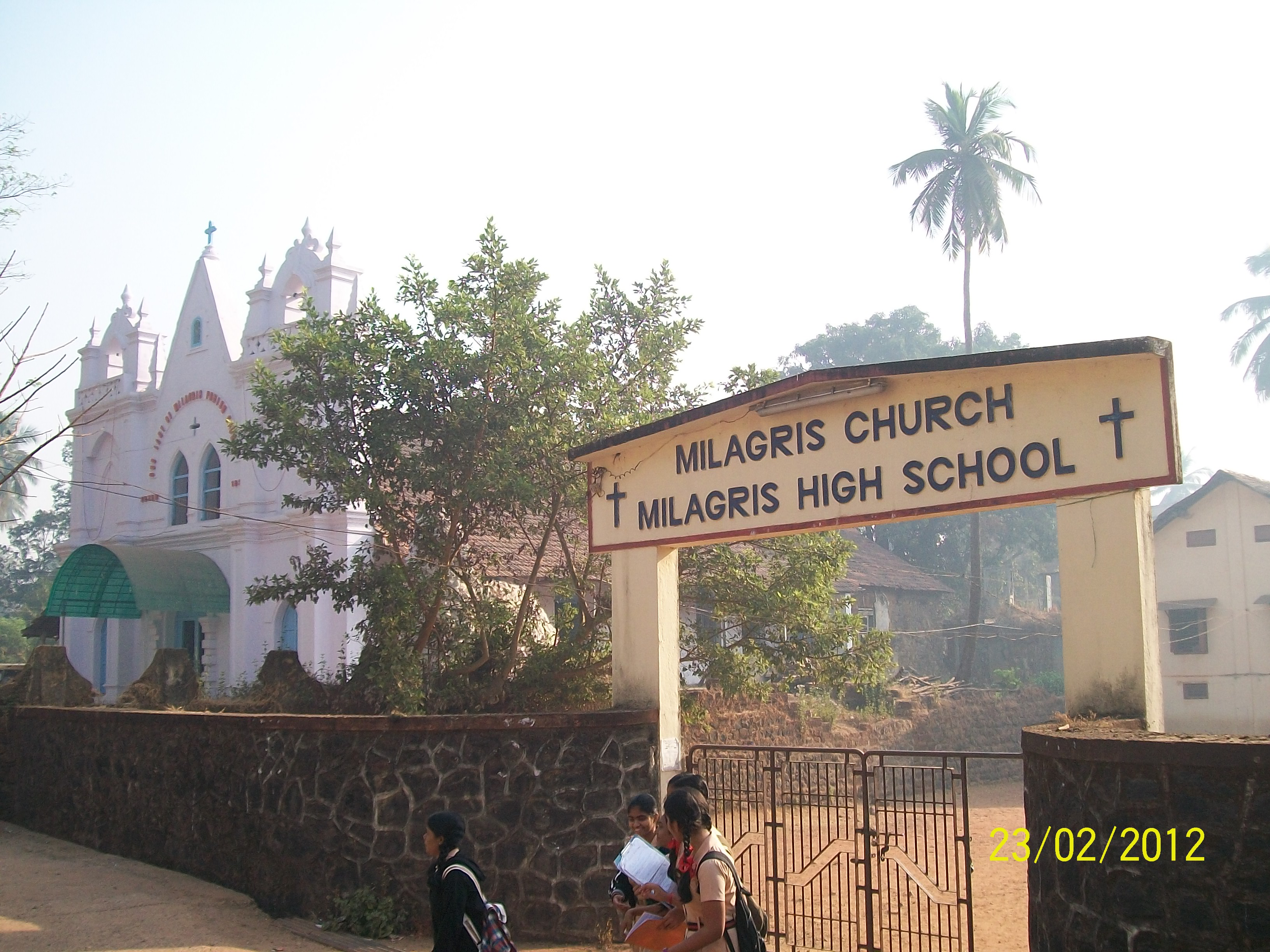

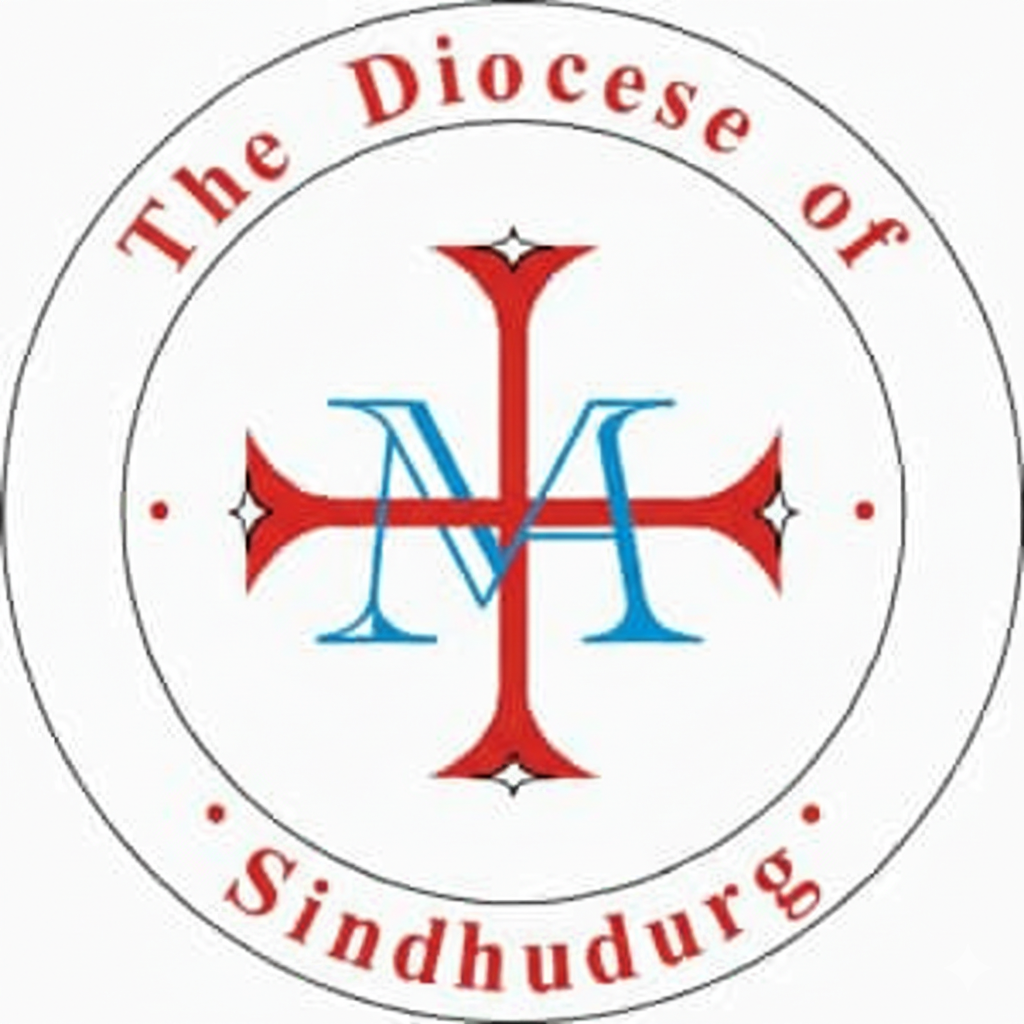
- Coat of arms

Location
- Country: India
- Metropolitan: Archdiocese of Goa and Daman

Statistics
- Area: 21,099 km^{2} (8,146 sq mi)
- Population: Total; Catholics: (as of 2023); 5,791,485; 19,835 (0.3%)
- Parishes: 21

Information
- Denomination: Catholic
- Sui iuris church: Latin Church
- Rite: Roman Rite
- Established: 5 July 2005
- Cathedral: Cathedral of Our Lady of Miracles in Sawantvadi

Current leadership
- Pope: Leo XIV
- Bishop: Francisco Antonio Agnelo Jacinto Pinheiro
- Metropolitan Archbishop: Filipe Neri Ferrão
- Bishops emeritus: Anthony Alwyn Fernandes Barreto

The Roman Catholic Diocese of Sindhudurg (Dioecesis Sindhudurgiensis) in India was created on 5 July 2005, when it was split from the Roman Catholic Diocese of Poona. It was a suffragan diocese of the Archdiocese of Bombay until 25 November 2006, when Pope Benedict XVI transferred it to the newly established Metropolitan province of Goa and Damão. The parish church in Sawantwadi, dedicated to Our Lady of Miracles, serves as the cathedral for the diocese.

The diocese covers an area of 21,099 km^{2} of the state Maharashtra, covering the districts Sindhudurg, Ratnagiri and Kolhapur except the St. Francis Xavier parish in Kolhapur City. Neighboring dioceses are the Archdiocese of Goa and Daman to the south, the Diocese of Belgaum to the southeast, to the east the Diocese of Poona, to the north the Archdiocese of Bombay, and to the west is the Arabian Sea.

As of 2023, the total population in the diocese is 5,791,485, of which 19,835 (0.3%) are Catholic. The diocese is divided into 21 parishes and 5 missions.

The first bishop of the diocese was Anthony Alwyn Fernandes Barreto, appointed by Benedict XVI upon creation of the diocese in 2005 and serving until his resignation in 2024. Barreto came from an aristocratic family from Goa which had been knighted by the King of Portugal during Portuguese rule. It has been reported that Barreto's inheritance from his ancestry has been transferred to the diocese to purchase land to build schools.

On 14 February 2026, Pope Leo XIV announced the appointment of Francisco Antonio Agnelo Jacinto Pinheiro as the second bishop of the diocese. Pinheiro was previously a priest of the Archdiocese of Goa and Daman.
