= Francisco de Melo (bishop) =

Most Reverend Francisco de Melo
- Bishop of Goa
- Church: Catholic Church
- Diocese: Diocese of Goa
- In office: 1533–1536
- Predecessor: None
- Successor: João de Albuquerque

Personal details
- Died: 27 April 1536 Evora, Portugal

Francisco de Melo (died 1536) was a Roman Catholic prelate who was named as the first Bishop of Goa (1533–1536).

== Biography ==
On 31 Jan 1533, Francisco de Melo was appointed during the papacy of Pope Clement VII as the first Bishop of Goa. He never took possession of the diocese as he died in Evora, Portugal prior to his departure on 27 Apr 1536.

== External links and additional sources ==
- Cheney, David M. "Archdiocese of Goa e Damão". Catholic-Hierarchy.org. (for Chronology of Bishops) ^{[self-published]}
- Chow, Gabriel. "Metropolitan Archdiocese of Goa and Daman (India)". GCatholic.org. (for Chronology of Bishops) ^{[self-published]}

Catholic Church titles
Preceded by None	Bishop of Goa; 1533–1536	Succeeded by João de Albuquerque
