= Jorge Temudo =

Most Reverend Jorge Temudo
- Bishop of Goa
- Church: Catholic Church
- Archdiocese: Diocese of Goa
- Diocese: Diocese of Cochin
- In office: 1567–1571
- Predecessor: Gaspar de Leão Pereira
- Successor: Gaspar de Leão Pereira
- Previous post: Bishop of Cochin (1558–1567)

Orders
- Consecration: 15 Apr 1560

Personal details
- Died: 29 April 1571

Jorge Temudo, O.P. was a Roman Catholic prelate who served as the Bishop of Goa (1567–1571) and the first Bishop of Cochin (1558–1567).

== Biography ==
Jorge Temudo was ordained a priest in the Order of Preachers and consecrated bishop in Lisbon on 15 Apr 1560. On 4 Feb 1558, he was appointed during the papacy of Pope Paul IV as Bishop of Cochin. On 13 Jan 1567, he was appointed during the papacy of Pope Pius V as Bishop of Goa. He served as Bishop of Goa until his death on 29 Apr 1571.

Catholic Church titles
Preceded by None	Bishop of Cochin; 1558–1567	Succeeded by Henrique de Távora e Brito
Preceded by Gaspar de Leão Pereira	Bishop of Goa; 1567–1571	Succeeded by Gaspar de Leão Pereira
