= Gaetano Nicosia =

Servant of God Gaetano Nicosia SDB
- Priest of the Salesians of Don Bosco
- Church: Roman Catholic Church

Orders
- Ordination: 25 March 1946 by João de Deus Ramalho

Personal details
- Born: 3 April 1915 San Giovanni la Punta, Catania, Sicily, Italy
- Died: 6 November 2017 (aged 102) Wong Chuk Hang, Aberdeen, Hong Kong
- Buried: Cemitério de São Miguel Arcanjo, Macau

Sainthood
- Venerated in: Catholic Church
- Title as Saint: Servant of God

Priest styles of Gaetano Nicosia
- Reference style: The Reverend
- Informal style: Father

Ordination history of Gaetano Nicosia
History
Priestly ordination
- Ordained by: João de Deus Ramalho

Gaetano Nicosia SDB (Chinese: 胡子義; 3 April 1915 - 6 November 2017) was an Italian Roman Catholic missionary priest who served the Hansen’s disease patients in Macau for over 50 years.

== Biography ==
=== Early life ===
Gaetano Nicosia was born on 3 April 1915 in San Giovanni la Punta, a town located in Catania, Sicily, Italy. He was sent to China as a missionary in 1935 and 2 years later, he professed as a member of the Salesians of Don Bosco in Hong Kong.

=== Ministry ===
On 25 March 1946, Nicosia was ordained priest in the Seminary of St. Joseph, Macau by João de Deus Ramalho, Bishop of Macau. He served both in Macau and Hong Kong for 82 years, dedicating his life and mission to the education of young people and care of the marginalised.

From 1963, he ministered at the small village in Ká Hó, Coloane, located in Macau. During that time, Ká Hó was the leprosarium for people infected with Hansen's disease. Nicosia decided to serve the patients in the Ká Hó Leprosarium, and suggested renaming it to "Vila de Nossa Senhora" (Our Lady's Village).

During his mission in Ká Hó, Nicosia established the Church of Our Lady of Sorrows in 1966 with the support of Pope Paul VI, the Portuguese Government of Macau and the Catholic Diocese of Macau. He also established a school, and a hospital for people with disabilities.

=== Later life and death ===
Due to age and declining health, Nicosia ended his mission in Ká Hó and moved to Hong Kong to recuperate. He died on 6 November 2017 at the Little Sisters of the Poor Home for the Aged, in Wong Chuk Hang, Aberdeen, Hong Kong, at the age of 102. After his Funeral Mass was held in Hong Kong, his remains were transferred to Macau and buried in the Cemitério de São Miguel Arcanjo.

=== Cause of Beatification and Canonization ===
On 16 July 2025, the bishop of Macau, Stephen Lee Bun Sang, issued the official edict announcing the opening of the Cause for the Beatification and Canonization of Gaetano Nicosia. At the same time, Nicosia was declared "Servant of God."
