= António Sebastião Valente =

Portuguese archbishop and theologian

- Archbishop of Goa; Patriarch of the East Indies
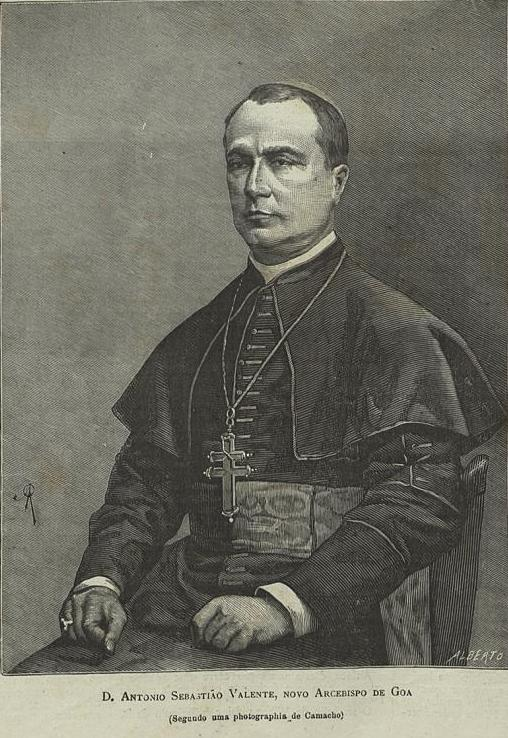
- Reproduced from Revista Occidente, photo by Luís de Campos (21 March 1882)

Personal details
- Born: 20 January 1846 El Puerto de Santa María, Spain
- Died: 25 January 1908 (aged 62) Goa, India
- Denomination: Roman Catholic
- Coat of arms

Dom Sebastião António Valente (20 January 1846 - 25 January 1908) was a Catholic archbishop and Portuguese colonial administrator, the first Patriarch of the East Indies.

== Biography ==
Born in El Puerto de Santa María, province of Cadiz (Spain), he was the son of Maria João Valente and Bridget Medeiros, a native of Mértola, Portugal. He attended primary school in Beja, graduated in Coimbra and taught in the Seminaries of Viseu and Santarém. He was ordained a deacon on 23 September 1871, and on 25 May 1872 ordained a priest.

== Consecrated Archbishop ==
His consecration as the Archbishop of Goa and the Primate of the East was by Cardinal Gaetano Aloisi Masella, Titular Archbishop of Neocaesarea in Ponto. The Principal Co-Consecrators were Archbishop António José de Freitas Honorato, Titular Archbishop of Mitylene and Bishop José Dias Correia de Carvalho, Bishop of Santiago de Cabo Verde.

In 1886, with the elevation of the Goan archdiocese to the position of the Patriarchate of the East Indies, he became the first Patriarch of the East.

== Chairman of the Governing Council ==
He exercised, in addition, for seven terms, the functions of the Chairman of the Government of Portuguese India—Presidente do Conselho de Governo do Estado Português da Índia (1886, 1889, 1892, 1894, 1897 and 1905).

He died, while in office as Patriarch, on 25 January 1908.

NewAdvent.org says: "In recent times one provincial council was held (1894) by Dom Antonio S. Valente, in which seventy-nine decrees were framed."

== Sources ==
- worldstatesmen.org
- Catholic Hierarchy
- GCatholic
