= Mateus de Oliveira Xavier =

Portuguese bishop (1858-1929)

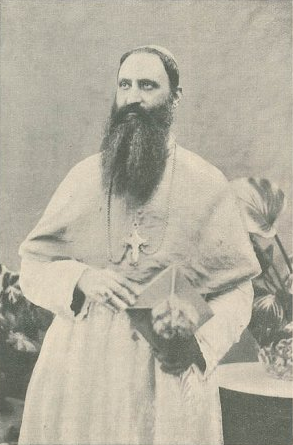
- Title: Archbishop of Goa and Daman

Personal life
- Born: 14 September 1858 Vila de Rei
- Died: 19 May 1929 (aged 70) Goa
- Home town: Valle de Urra
- Parent(s): Joaquim de Oliveira; Maria Joaquina Braz de Oliveira

Religious life
- Religion: Roman Catholic
- Denomination: Catholic
- School: University of Coimbra

Senior posting
- Based in: Roman Catholic Diocese of Cochin
- Period in office: 31 December 1908 - 19 May 1929

Dom Mateus de Oliveira Xavier (Vila de Rei, Vila de Rei, 14 October 1858 — Goa, 19 May 1929) was a Portuguese Bishop Of the Roman Catholic Diocese of Cochin and Patriarch of the East Indies.

== Biography ==
He was the son of Joaquim de Oliveira and Maria Joaquina Braz de Oliveira. At an early age, he, along with his siblings, were sent to Fundada, to live with their paternal grandparents. There, under the care of his uncles, João and Sebastião de Oliveira Xavier and Aniceto de Oliveira, he received the rudimentary theological instruction. In 1871, he was sent to the neighbouring village of Sertã to study Latin, with Father Joaquim Pedro Pereira, a distinguished professor, before completing his Latin exam at the Liceu de Santarém (lyceum of Santarém).

In October 1874, he entered the Seminário Patriarcal de Santarém (Patriarchal Seminary of Santarém) to study the ecclesiastical sciences. Once his theological studies were concluded, in October 1879, he went to Castelo Branco (seat of the Diocese) and prepared to receive religious orders, along with his brothers. Ordained presbytery on 11 June 1881, he continued on to Coimbra; in October he registered for theology studies at the university, studying with distinction and concluding in 1888.

In addition to inheriting the chaplaincy at the Convent of Santa Clara, he presided as the president of the Conference of the St. Vincent de Paul, the philanthropic association constituted by students. In October 1888, he was appointed professor of ecclesiastical and preparatory studies, as well as spiritual director at the Colégio das Missões Ultramarinas (College of Overseas Missions) in Cernache do Bonjardim. He held this position until 1893.

=== Missionary ===
In 1893, the Patriarch of the East Indies, D. António Sebastião Valente, returned to Portugal on sabbatical, in order to alleviate his failing health. Recognizing his abilities, he invited Bishop Mateus to be his private secretary. Oliveira Xavier accepted the position and left for Portuguese India on 11 January 1884, arriving on 5 March in Goa. On 7 November D. Mateus Xavier was named missionary for the Patriarchy of India. He landed in Cochim on 18 February 1894 and visited the suffragan diocese, then governed by D. João Gomes Ferreira, before carrying-on to Goa.

There, in addition to his duties, he was nominated metropolitan and pontifical judge, before finally being elected rector of the Rachol Seminary in June 1894. Undertaking a vast series of reforms at the seminary, he established a preparatory school that concentrated in theological studies. With further authorization from the government and pontificate, he created a theology faculty, turing the Rachol Seminary into primary and best institution in India.

=== Bishop ===
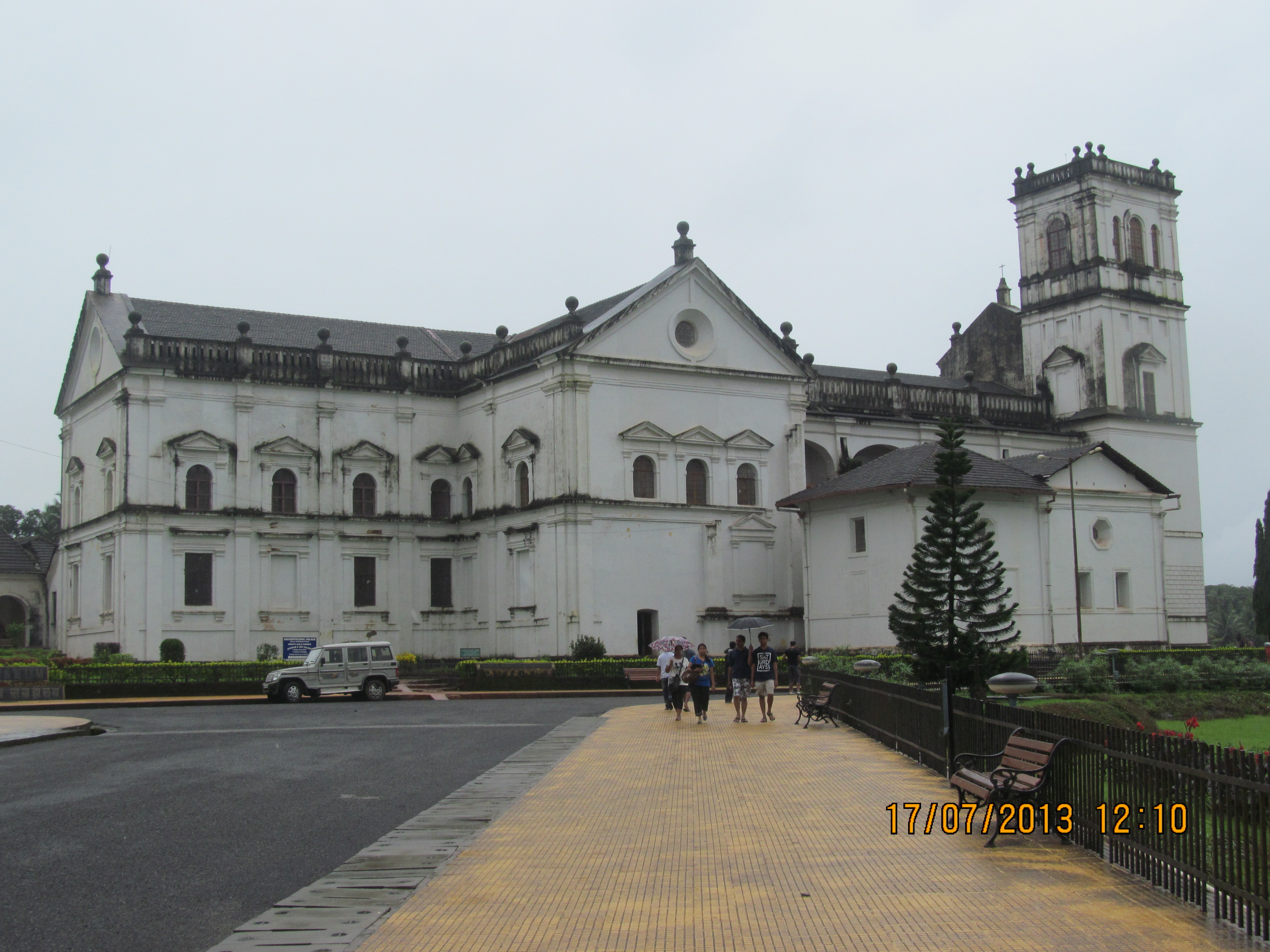
A view of the Sé Cathedral of Goa, reconstructed through initiatives of the former Bishop of Cochim

Following the death of Bishop D. João Gomes Ferreira, D. Mateus Xavier was nominated to replace him as the Bishop of Cochim on 11 October 1897. D. António Sebastião Valente and the Minister of the Navy, Henrique de Barros Gomes, supported his nomination, which was confirmed on 11 October 1897 by Pope Leo XIII. Since the Papal bulls were slow to reach India, the episcopal consecration was only held on 30 January 1898, in the Sé Cathedral of Goa. He arrived in the Diocese on 5 March, making his solemn entry to take possession of his diocese.

His first act in the Diocese was to re-begin work on the new cathedral, whose central nave fell into ruin following a stormy night: D. Mateus Xavier, therefore, had no cathedral to preach from, when he arrived. Furthermore, the Christians in the area were embroiled in controversies associated with the caste system. He sought to resolve or arbitrate many of the issues of these Christians, opening the local churches and continued work on the cathedral.

The cathedral, which was constructed in a nondescript style, that mixed Manueline and Indian ornamentation. Work on the site began in the middle of 1898. It was re-opened for worship of the Te Deum marking the coronation of Pope Pius X on 9 August 1903, eventually solemnly consecrated on 19 November 1905, assisted by patriarch D. António Sebastião Valente, local and neighbouring bishops (a total of 11 prelates).

D. Mateus Xavier contributed to the advancement of local education, expanding local schools and elevating smaller schools to lyceums, contracting 15 and 20 teachers, establishing full preparatory instruction that allowed entry to Indian universities. Later, these official schools were aggregated into the University of Madrasta, receiving subsidies from English government, under appropriate conditions.

=== Later life ===
By decree on 31 December 1908, after the death of D. António Sebastião Valente, Bishop Mateus was elevated to Archbishop of Goa and Patriarch of the East Indies (on 26 February 1909), a position he held until his death, on 19 May 1929. In 1928, with the addition of Diocese of Daman, the archbishopric was expanded, and D. Mateus Xavier became the Archbishop of Goa and Daman.

== See also ==
- Catholic Church in India
