= Filipe Neri Ferrão =

Indian Catholic cardinal (born 1953)

His Eminence Filipe Neri António Sebastião do Rosário Ferrão
- Cardinal; Archbishop of Goa and Daman; Patriarch of the East Indies
- Ferrão in 2025
- Church: Catholic
- Archdiocese: Goa and Daman
- Appointed: 16 January 2004
- Predecessor: Raul Nicolau Gonçalves
- Other posts: President of the Conference of Catholic Bishops of India (2019‍–‍present); Cardinal Priest of Santa Maria in Via (2022‍–‍present)
- Previous posts: Titular Bishop of Vanariona (1993‍–‍2004); Auxiliary Bishop of Goa and Daman (1993‍–‍2004); Vice President of the Conference of Catholic Bishops of India (2011‍–‍2017); Second Vice President of the Catholic Bishops' Conference of India (2014‍–‍2018)

Orders
- Ordination: 28 October 1979
- Consecration: 10 April 1994 by Raul Nicolau Gonçalves
- Created cardinal: 27 August 2022 by Pope Francis
- Rank: Cardinal priest

Personal details
- Born: 20 January 1953 (age 73) Mapuçá, Goa, Portuguese India
- Motto: Ut Omnes Unum Sint (Latin for 'That they all may be one') John 17:21
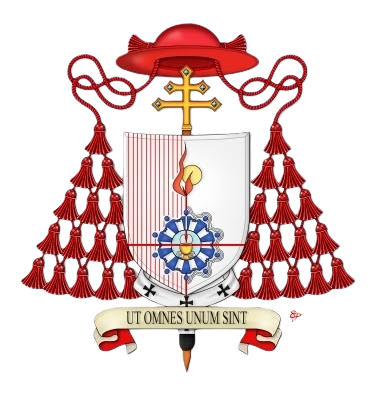
- Coat of arms

Styles of Filipe Neri Ferrão
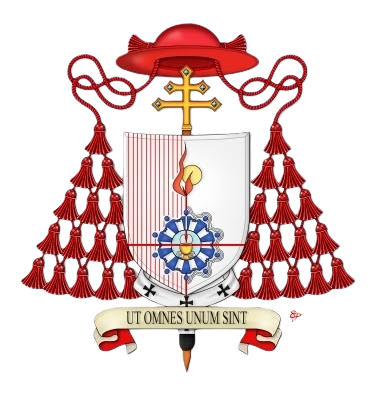
- Reference style: His Eminence
- Spoken style: Your Eminence
- Religious style: Cardinal
- Informal style: Cardinal

Filipe Neri António Sebastião do Rosário Ferrão (born 20 January 1953) is an Indian Catholic prelate who has served as Archbishop of Goa and Daman since 2004. He was previously an auxiliary bishop of the same archdiocese from 1993 to 2004. Ferrão was created a cardinal by Pope Francis in 2022.

Ferrão is the sixth prelate of Goan origin to attain the rank of cardinal and the first Archbishop of Goa and Daman to be a cardinal since an episcopal see was established there in 1557.

== Biography ==
=== Early life and education ===
Ferrão was born on 20 January 1953 in Mapusa, Goa, to Agostinho Lourenço Tomé Ferrão and Maria Palmira Eugênia Gertrudes da Conceição Nazaré; he is the youngest of their three children. (Note: There were several priests among his relations, including two maternal uncles, two paternal uncles, and four in earlier generations.) After completing the Preparatory Course at the Minor Seminary of Our Lady, Saligao-Pilerne, Goa, he went to study philosophy and theology at the Papal Seminary, Pune. Ferrão was ordained a priest on 28 October 1979. His pastoral assignments were: Parochial Vicar at Salvador do Mundo in 1979 and in Chinchinim from 1981 to 1984; Prefect of Discipline at the Minor Seminary of Our Lady, Saligão-Pilerne, from 1984 to 1986, where he was also Director of the Vocation Commission for Diocesan Clergy.

Ferrão then studied at the Pontificia Universitas Urbaniana, obtaining a licentiate degree in Biblical Theology in 1988, and then in Brussels at the International Institute Lumen Vitae, earning a licentiate degree in catechetics and pastoral theology in 1991.

Returning to Goa, he was the first director of the Diocesan Centre for Lay Apostolate from 1991 to 1994. There he launched the publication of booklets of daily scriptural reflections for the faithful: Daily Flash and Jivitacho Prokas.

His other assignments included Convenor of the Team for Transfers of Priests from 1992 to 1997; Ecclesiastical Advisor to St. Luke's Medical Guild, Goa, from 1992 to 1994, and Episcopal Vicar for the North Zone of the Archdiocese, from 1993 to 1994.

He is fluent in Konkani, English, Portuguese, Italian, French and German.

=== Bishop and archbishop ===
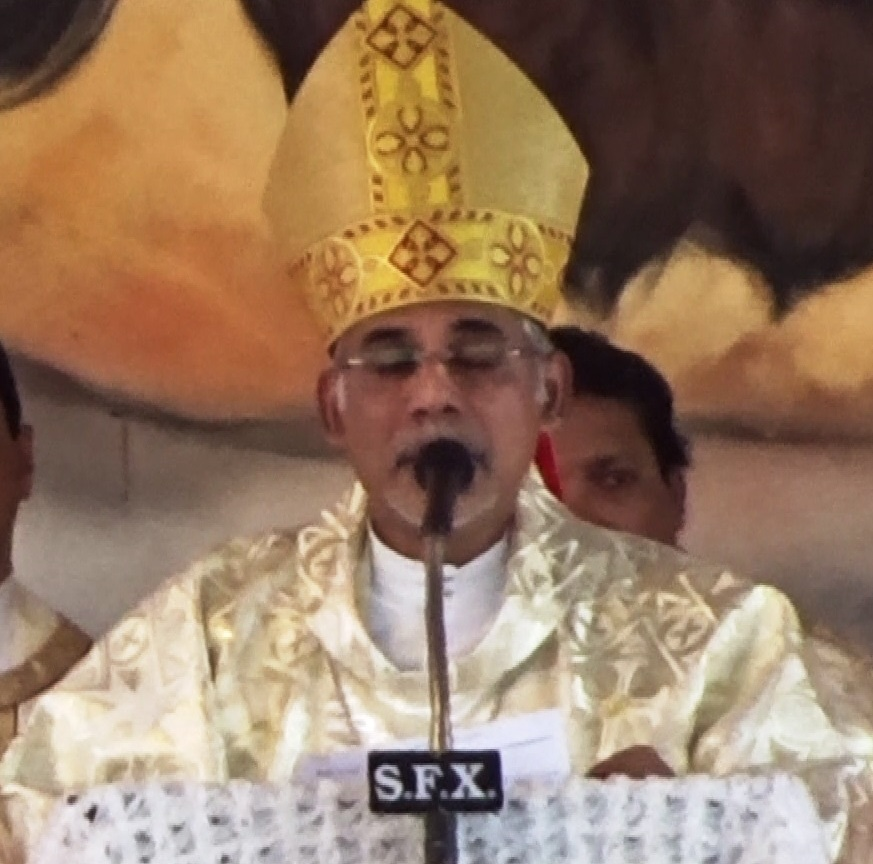
Archbishop Filipe Neri Ferrão during St. Francis Xavier Feast Mass

Pope John Paul II appointed him auxiliary bishop of Goa and Daman and titular bishop of Vanariona on 25 January 1994. He received his episcopal consecration on 10 April 1994 from Archbishop Raul Nicolau Gonçalves in the Se Cathedral in Old Goa, with bishops Aleixo das Neves Dias and Ferdinand Joseph Fonseca as co-consecrators.

On 16 January 2004, Pope John Paul named him Archbishop of Goa and Daman with the honorary title of Patriarch of the East Indies. He was installed as archbishop on 21 March 2004.

On 25 November 2006, the Archdiocese of Goa and Daman was reorganized as a metropolitan archdiocese with a suffragan diocese and no longer directly subject to the Holy See. Pope Benedict XVI named Ferrão its first archbishop.

=== Cardinal ===
On 29 May 2022, Pope Francis announced that he planned to make Ferrão a cardinal. On 27 August 2022, Pope Francis made him a cardinal priest, assigning him the title of Santa Maria in Via.

In February 2024, Ferrão was elected President of the Federation of Asian Bishops' Conferences replacing Cardinal Charles Maung Bo of Yangon, Myanmar.

On 23 October 2024, the Synod of Bishops elected Ferrão a member of the Ordinary Council of the General Secretariat of the Synod.

Ferrão participated as a cardinal elector in the 2025 papal conclave that elected Pope Leo XIV.

== See also ==
- Cardinals created by Pope Francis
- List of current cardinals
- List of titular churches
