= João de Deus Ramalho =

His Excellency João de Deus Ramalho SJ
- Bishop of Macau
- Church: Catholic Church
- Diocese: Macau
- Installed: 6 November 1942
- Term ended: 9 January 1954

Orders
- Ordination: 30 July 1921
- Consecration: 6 November 1942 by Frederick Anthony Donaghy

Personal details
- Born: 8 January 1890 São Vicente da Beira, Portugal
- Died: 4 January 1958 (aged 67) Vilar do Paraíso, Portugal
- Denomination: Roman Catholic

João de Deus Ramalho (8 January 1980 - 4 January 1958) was a Portuguese Roman Catholic Prelate and Member of the Society of Jesus. He was the Bishop of the Diocese of Macau from 1942 until his resignation in 1954.

== Biography ==
Born in São Vicente da Beira in Portugal on 8 January 1890, after completing his education in his hometown, he entered the school in Guimarães run by the Jesuits; he later joined the Jesuits on 7 September 1906.

He was ordained a subdeacon on 28 July 1921, then a deacon on 29 July, and a priest on the 30th of the same month.

In 1926, after studying Chinese, he was assigned to Zhaoqing to exercise his priestly ministry until his elevstion to the episcopate. On 13 July 1940, he was appointed Vicar General of Zhaoqing, a position he held concurrently with his duties as a missionary in Zhaoqing.

On 24 September 1942, Pope Pius XII appointed Ramalho as the Bishop of Macau, he was consecrated on 6 November 1942 by Frederick Anthony Donaghy, Apostolic Vicar of Wuchow.

On 9 January 1954, he announced that the Holy See has accepted his resignation, however, he continue to govern the diocese as Apostolic Administrator until the appointment and arrival of the new Bishop of Macau. He later return to Portugal because of his health issues.

In late 1957, he suffered a stroke that paralyzed his left side of his face, he dies on 4 January 1958 in Vilar do Paraíso, he was 67.
