= José Vieira Alvernaz =

Portuguese prelate

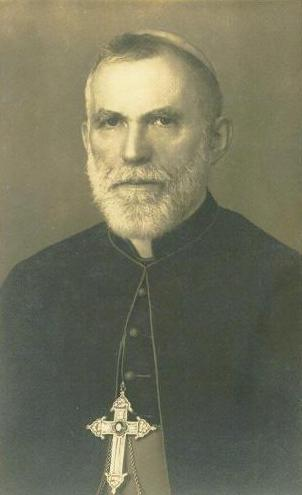
- Title: Archbishop of Goa and Daman

Personal life
- Born: 5 February 1898 Riberinha
- Died: 13 March 1986 (aged 88) Nossa Senhora da Conceição
- Resting place: Cemetery of Conceição
- Home town: Ribeirinha

Religious life
- Religion: Roman Catholic
- Denomination: Catholic

Senior posting
- Based in: Roman Catholic Diocese of Cochin
- Period in office: 16 September 1953 - 22 February 1975

Dom José Vieira Alvernaz (Riberinha, 5 February 1898 – Angra do Heroísmo, 13 March 1986) was a Portuguese prelate, Bishop of Cochin, Archbishop of Goa and Daman, Patriarch of the East Indies and one of the prominent figures of the Portuguese presence in India during the 20th century.

== Biography ==
He was ordained a priest in 1920.

In 1941, he was appointed Bishop of Cochin.

In 1950, he was appointed titular archbishop of Anasartha, co-adjunct archbishop of Goa and Daman and co-adjunct Patriarch of the East Indies. He succeeded Bishop José da Costa Nunes, in 1953, as Patriarch of the East Indies, a position he held until 1975.

After his resignation, the Holy See put the Roman Catholic Archdiocese of Goa and Daman under its direct subordination.

== Honours ==
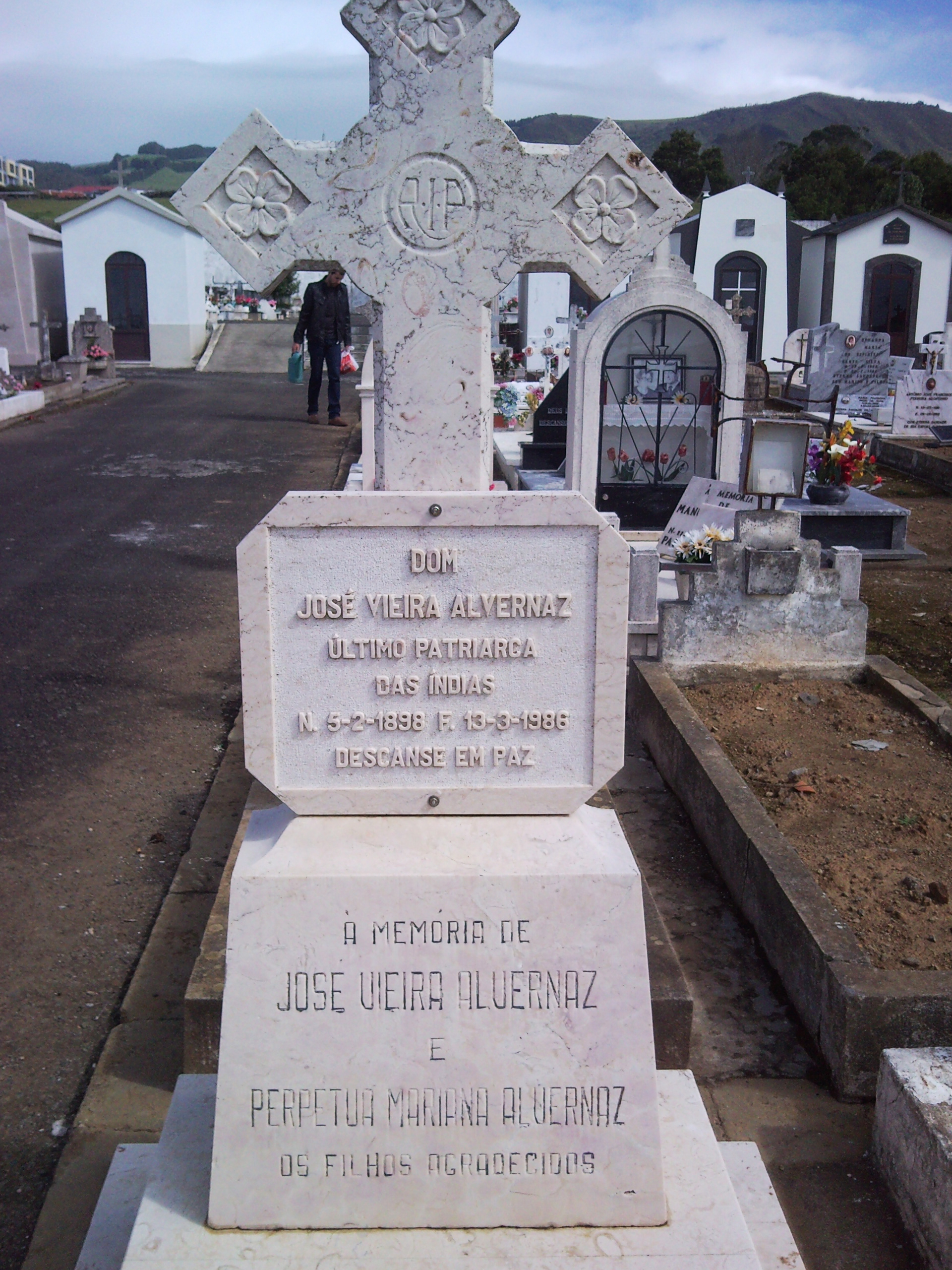
Tomb of D. José Vieira Alvernaz in the cemetery in Angra do Heroismo.

On 18 April 2012, the Museum of Angra do Heroísmo, opened an exposition entitled D. José Vieira Alvernaz, Patriarca das Índias Orientais (D. José Vieira Alvernaz, Patriarch of the East Indies).

== See also ==
- Catholic Church in Portugal
