= Goa =

State in Southwest India

- State
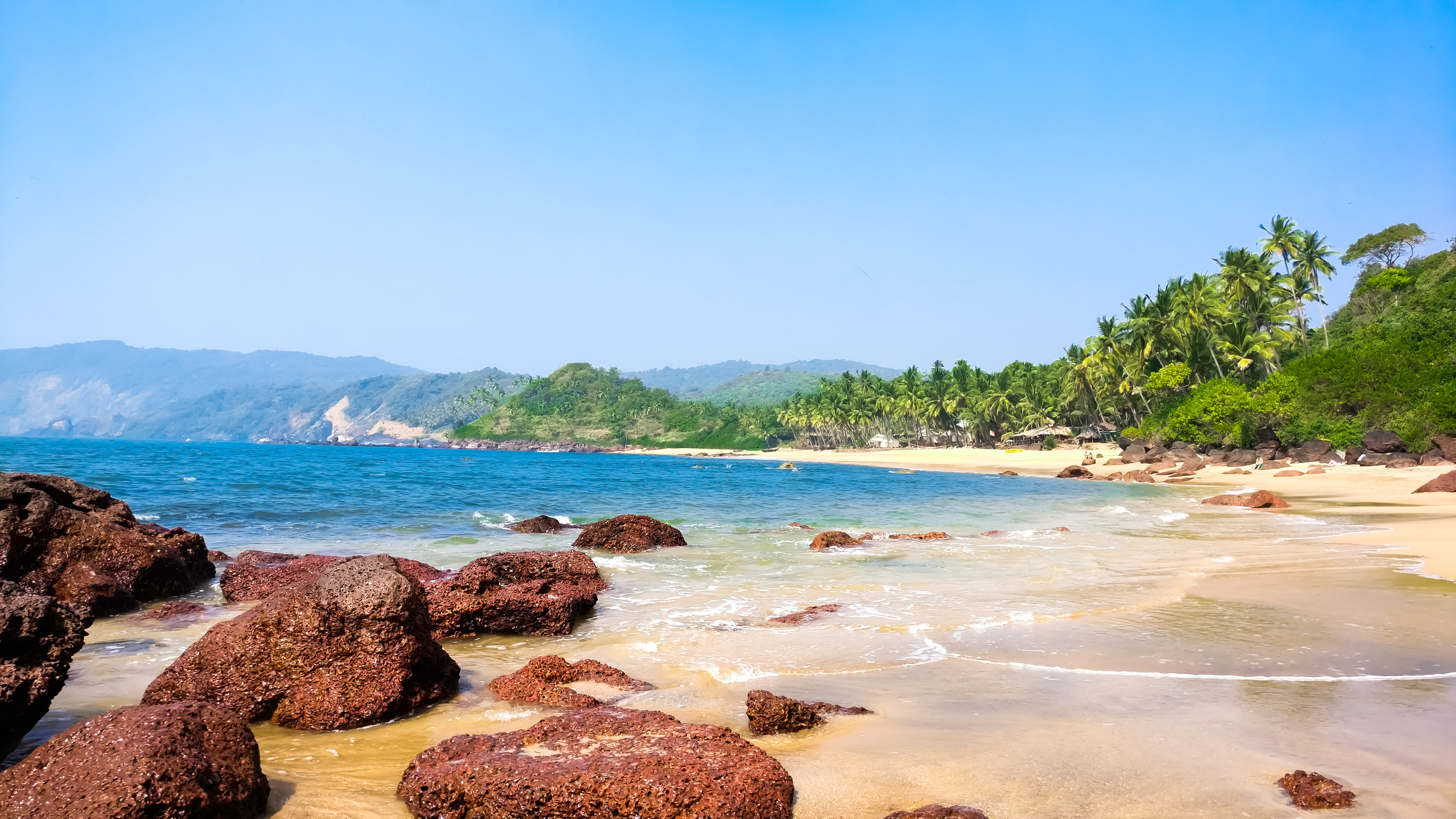
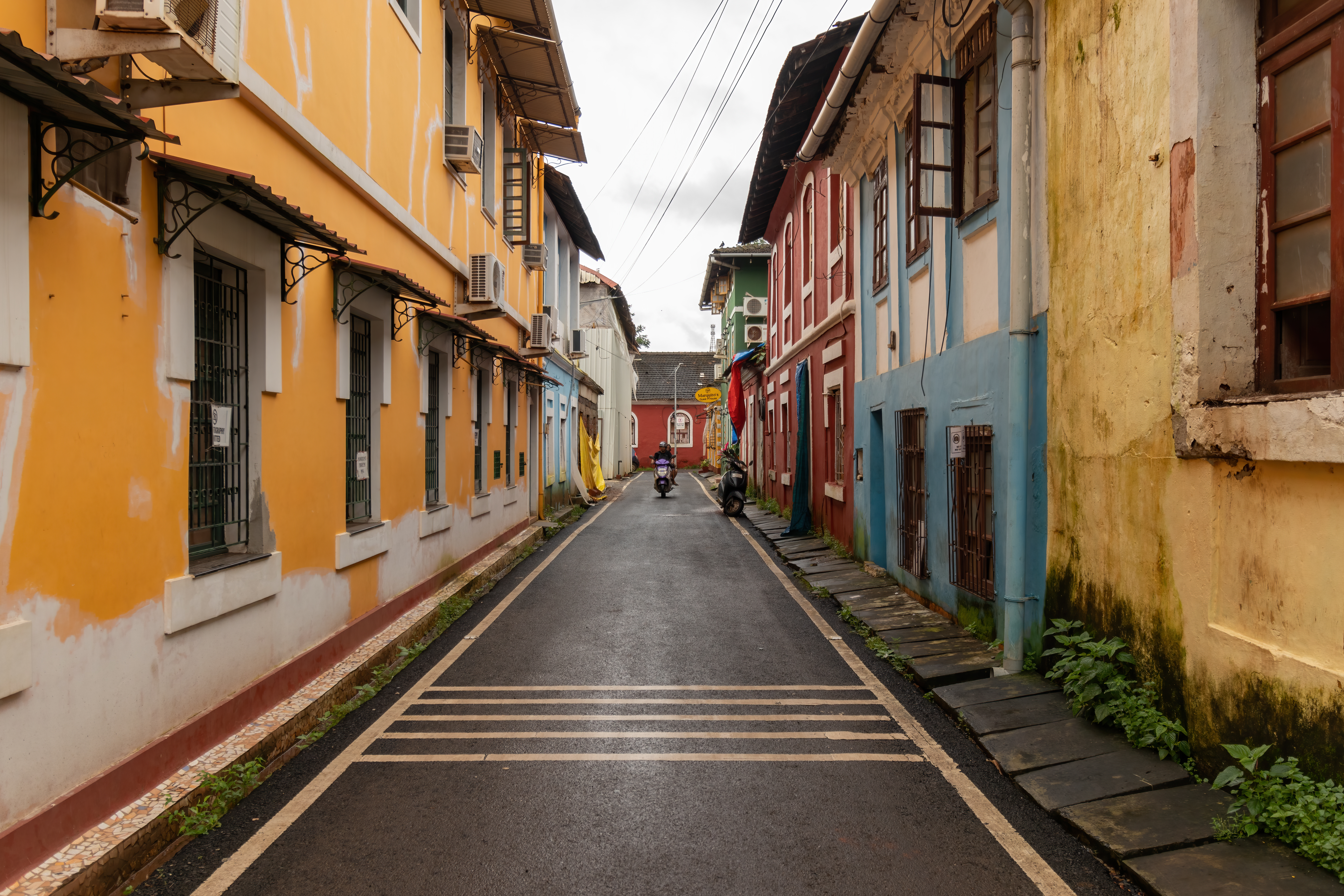
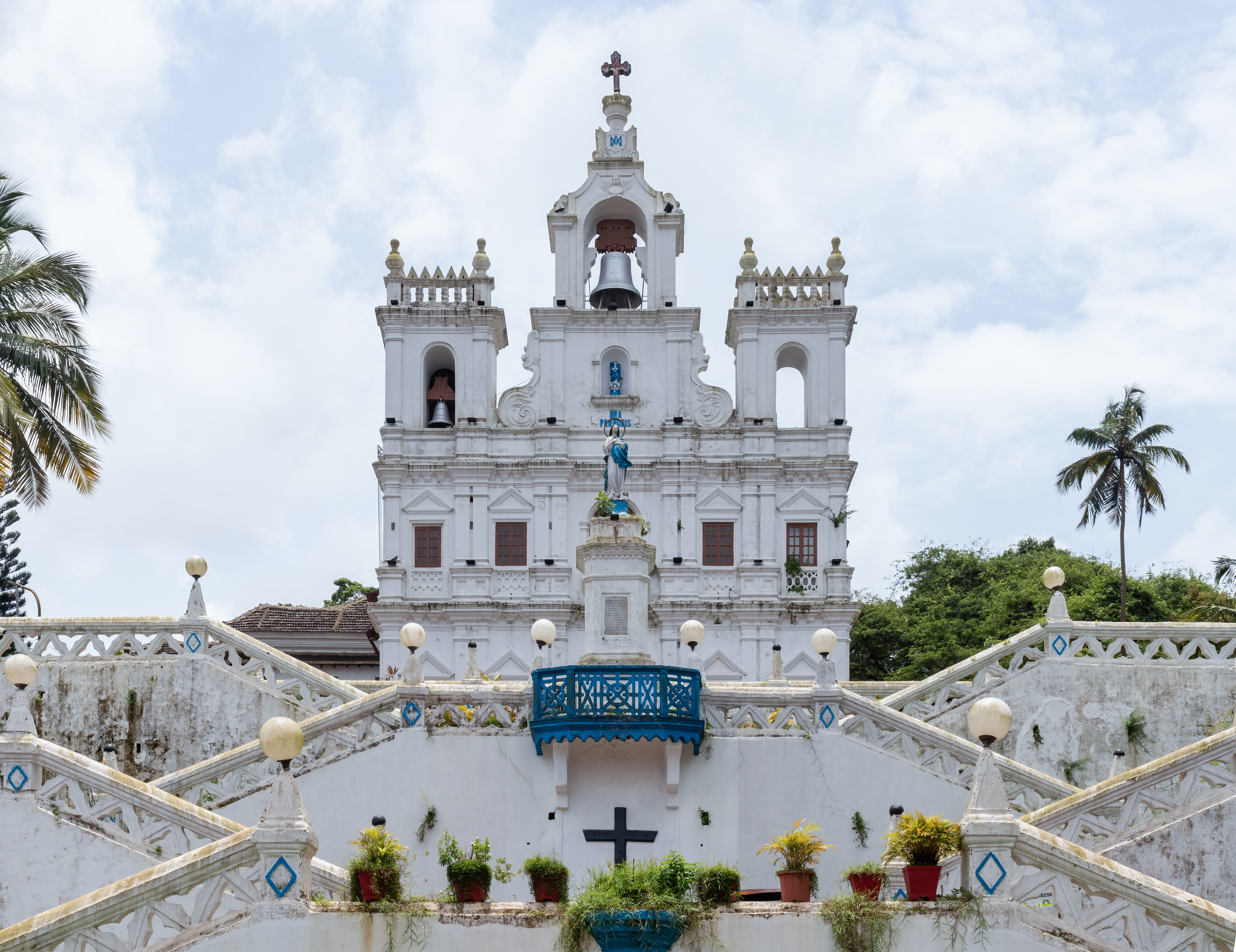
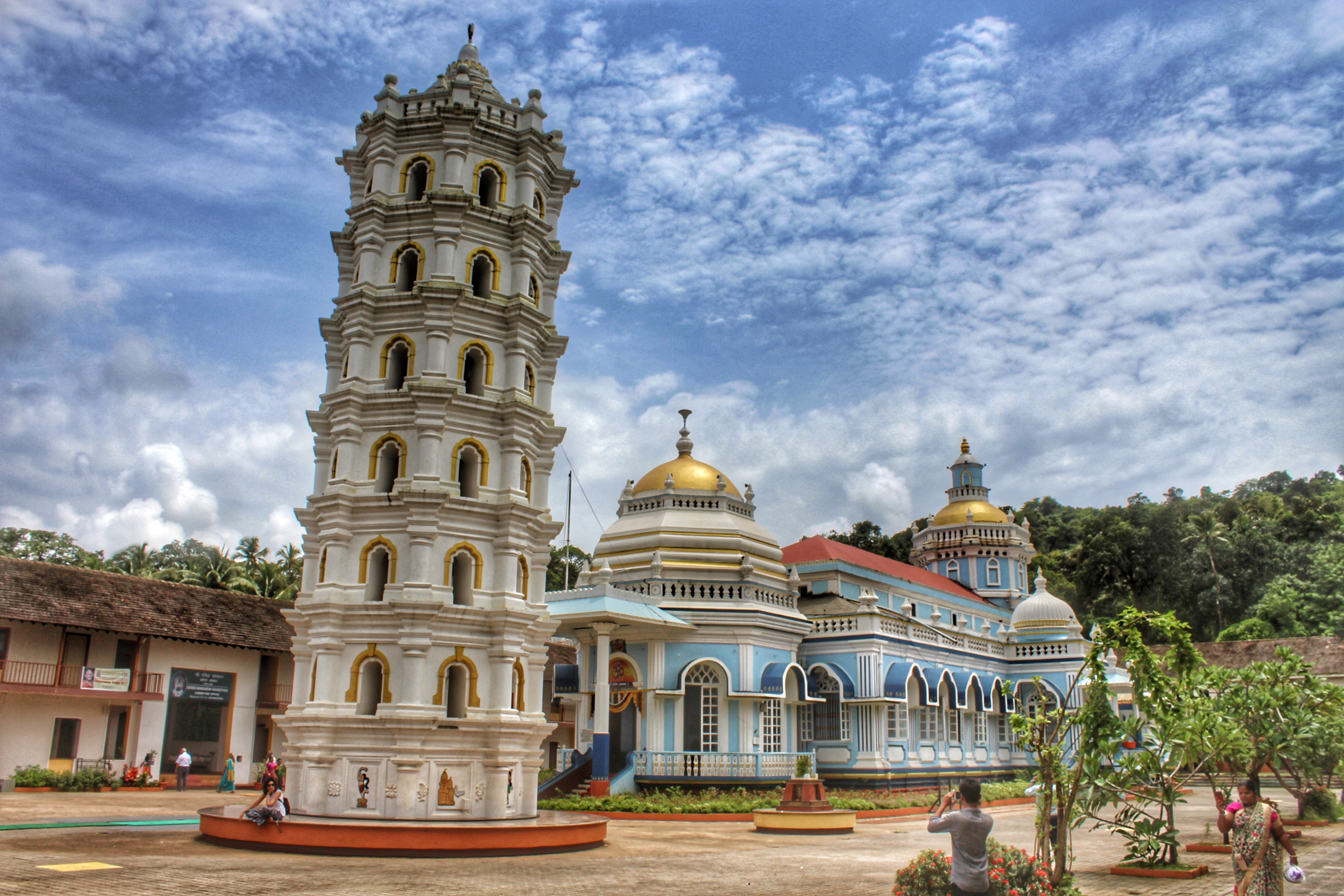
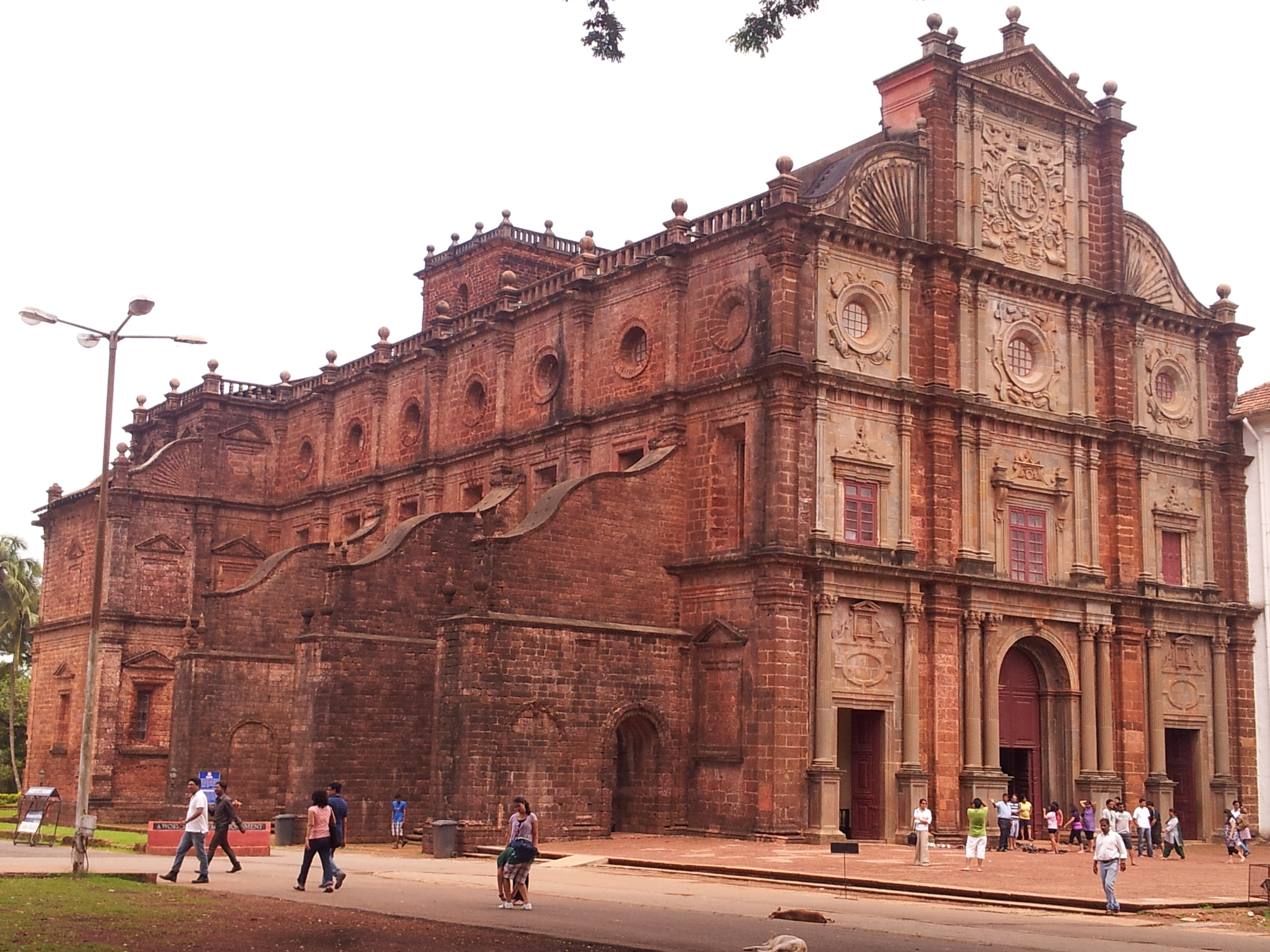
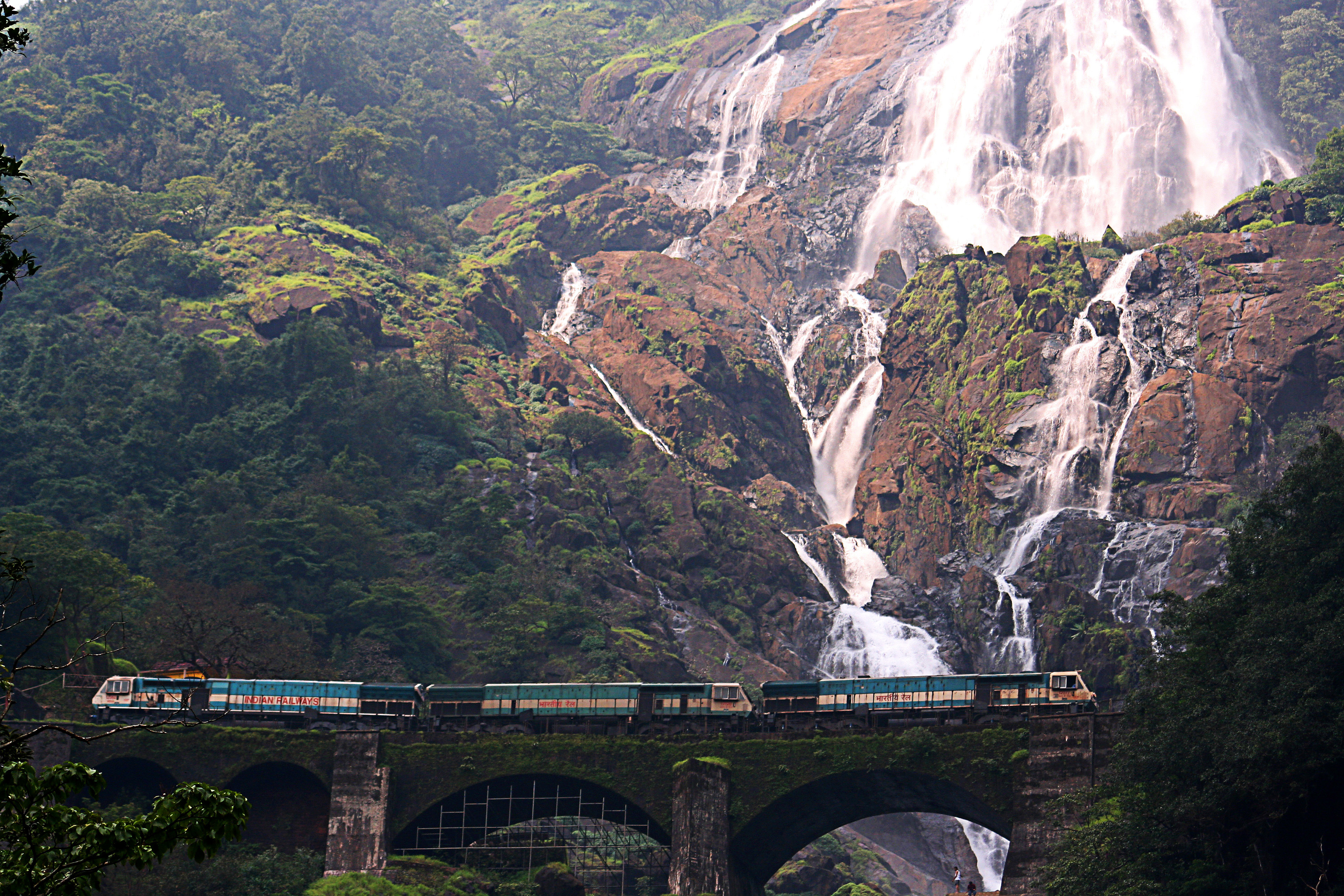
- Cola Beach Fontainhas Immaculate Conception Church Mangueshi Temple Basilica of Bom Jesus Dudhsagar Falls

- Emblem of Goa
- Nickname: "Pearl of the Orient"
- Motto: Sarve Bhadrāṇi Paśyantu Mā Kaścid Duḥkhamāpnuyāt (Sanskrit) "May everyone see goodness, may none suffer any pain"
- Location of Goa in India
- Coordinates: 15.50°N 73.83°E
- Country: India
- Region: West India
- Previously was: Goa, Daman and Diu
- Admission to union: 19 December 1961
- Formation (by bifurcation): 30 May 1987
- Capital: Panaji
- Largest city: Vasco da Gama, Goa
- Districts: 3

Government
  - Body: Government of Goa
  - Governor: Ashok Gajapathi Raju
  - Chief Minister: Pramod Sawant (BJP)

Area
  - Total: 3,702 km^{2} (1,429 sq mi)
  - Rank: 28th
- Highest elevation (Sonsogor): 1,026 m (3,366 ft)
- Lowest elevation (Arabian Sea): 0 m (0 ft)

Population (2025)
  - Total: ▲1,591,000
  - Rank: 28th
  - Density: 380/km^{2} (980/sq mi)
  - Urban: 77.89%
  - Rural: 22.11%
- Demonym(s): Goenkar, Goan

Language
  - Official: Konkani
  - Additional official: Marathi and English
  - Official script: Devanagari script

GDP
  - Total (2026–2027): ▼$15.00 billion (nominal) ▼$65.43 billion (PPP)
  - Rank: 23rd
  - Per capita: ▼$9,416 (nominal) ▼$41,073 (PPP) (2nd)
- Time zone: UTC+05:30 (IST)
- ISO 3166 code: IN-GA
- Vehicle registration: GA
- HDI (2023): ▲0.806 Very High (1st)
- Literacy (2025): 99.7% (2nd)
- Sex ratio (2025): 986♀/1000 ♂ (5th)
- Website: goa.gov.in
- Symbols of Goa
- Foundation day: Goa Day
- Bird: Flame-throated bulbul
- Flower: Jasmine
- Fruit: Cashew
- Mammal: Gaur
- Tree: Matti Terminalia crenulata
- List of Indian state symbols

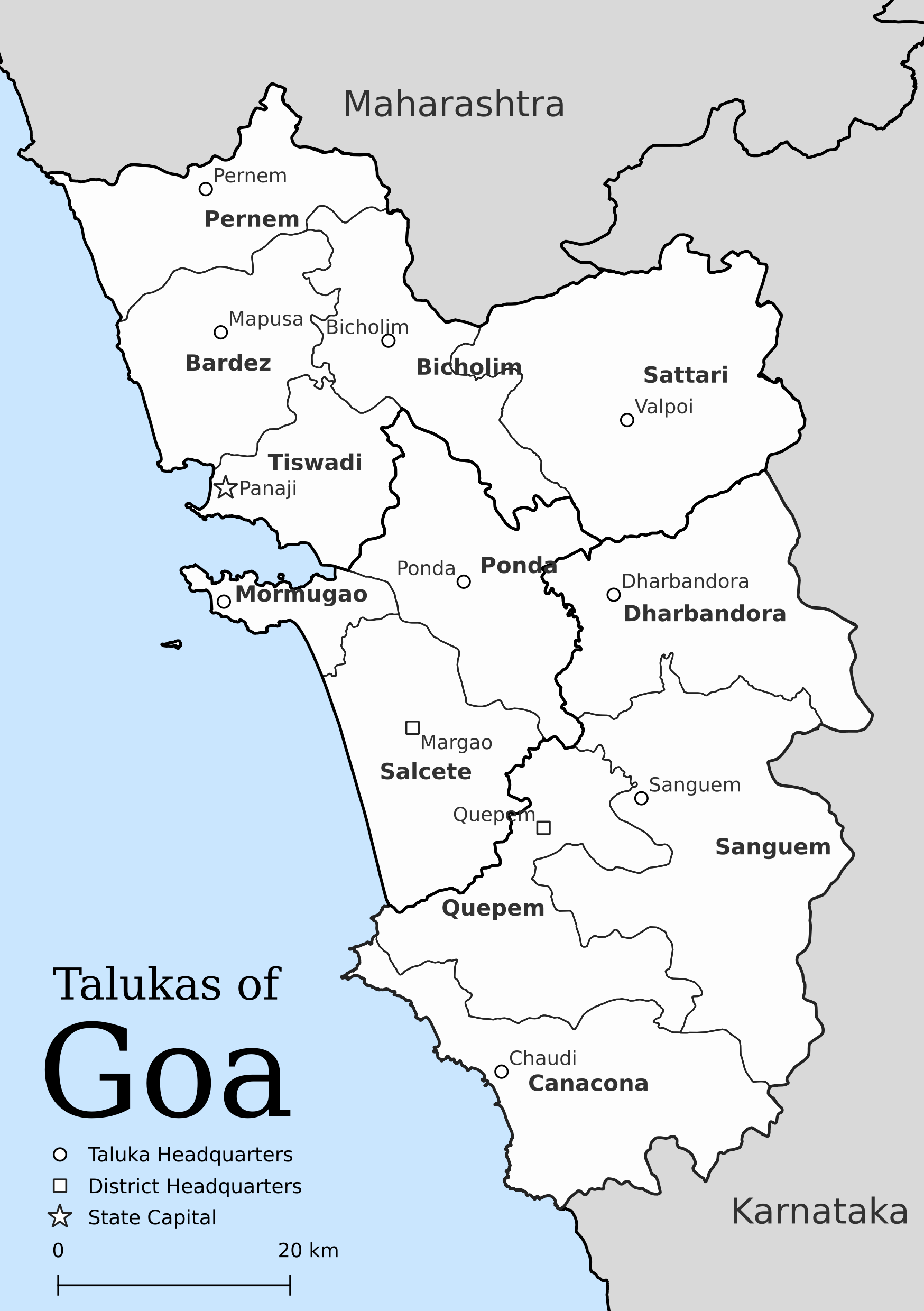
Taluka map of Goa

Goa (/ˈɡoʊ.ə/ GOH-ə; Konkani: [ɡɔ̃j]; Portuguese: [ˈɡoɐ]) is a state on the southwestern coast of India within the Konkan region. It is geographically separated from the Deccan highlands by the Western Ghats. It is bordered by the Indian states of Maharashtra to the north and Karnataka to the east and south, with the Arabian Sea forming its western coastline. It was the capital of the eastern Portuguese empire until 1961. It is India's smallest state by area and fourth-smallest by population. Panaji (Panjim) is the state's capital, while Vasco da Gama is its largest city by population. The state's official language is Konkani, spoken by the majority of its inhabitants.

The Portuguese, who first voyaged to the subcontinent in the early 16th century as merchants, conquered it on request of Timoji shortly thereafter. Goa became an overseas territory of the Portuguese Empire and part of what was then known as Portuguese India, remaining under Portuguese rule for approximately 451 years until its annexation by India in December 1961. The ancient City of Goa (now Old Goa), considered one of the greatest cities of Asia in the 16th century, was abandoned in the 19th century following disease outbreaks, and what remains of it now includes scattered churches and convents amidst ruins. The historic cities of Margão and Panjim still reflect the cultural legacy of Portugal.

Goa is one of India’s most developed small states and has the second-highest GDP per capita among all Indian states, more than twice the national average GDP per capita, and if it were a country, it would be an upper-middle-income economy. The Eleventh Finance Commission of India named Goa the best-placed state in terms of infrastructure, while India's National Commission on Population ranked it as having the highest quality of life in the country. It ranks highest among Indian states in the Human Development Index. Goa has a robust tourism sector. It has biodiversity, lying near the Western Ghats, a biodiversity hotspot.

== Etymology ==
After the Bahmani-Bijapuri city of Goa was captured by Afonso de Albuquerque in 1510, and made the capital of the Estado da Índia, the city gave its name to the contiguous territories.

The origin of the city name Goa is unclear. In ancient literature, Goa was known by many names, such as Gomanchala, Gopakapattana, Gopakapattam, Gopakapuri, Govapuri, Govem, and Gomantak. Other historical names for Goa are Sindapur, Sandabur, and Mahassapatam.

== History ==
=== Prehistory ===
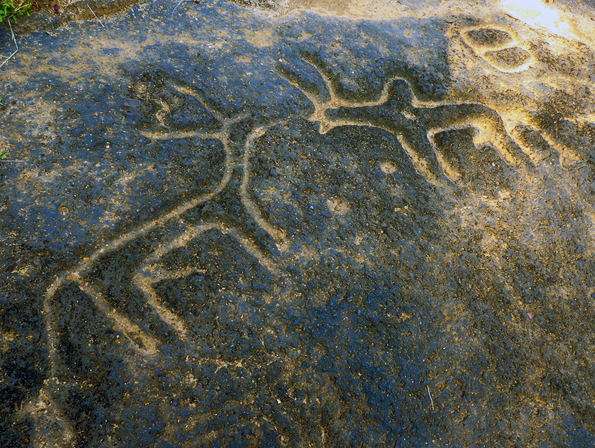
Usgalimal rock engravings

Rock art engravings found in Goa are one of the earliest known traces of human life in India. Goa, situated within the Shimoga-Goa Greenstone Belt in the Western Ghats (an area composed of metavolcanics, iron formations, and ferruginous quartzite), yields evidence for Acheulean occupation. Rock art engravings (petroglyphs) are present on laterite platforms and granite boulders in Usgalimal, near the west-flowing Kushavati river, and in Kajur. In Kajur, the rock engravings of animals, tectiforms, and other designs in granite have been associated with what is considered to be a megalithic stone circle, with a round granite stone in the centre. Petroglyphs, cones, stone-axe, and choppers dating to 10,000 years ago have been found in various locations in Goa, including Kazur, Mauxim, and the Mandovi-Zuari basin. Recently, these petroglyphs have been included in the tentative list of UNESCO world heritage sites.

Evidence of Paleolithic life is visible at Dabolim, Adkon, Shigao, Fatorpa, Arli, Maulinguinim, Diwar, Sanguem, Pilerne, and Aquem-Margaon. Difficulty in carbon dating the laterite rock compounds poses a problem for determining the exact time period.

Early Goan society underwent radical change when Indo-Aryan and Dravidian migrants amalgamated with the aboriginal locals, forming the base of early Goan culture.

=== Early history ===
In the 3rd century BC, Goa was part of the Maurya Empire, ruled by the Buddhist emperor, Ashoka of Magadha. Buddhist monks laid the foundation of Buddhism in Goa. Between the 2nd century BC and the 6th century AD, Goa was ruled by the Bhojas of Goa. The Chutus of Karwar also ruled some parts as feudatories of the Satavahanas of Kolhapur (2nd century BC to the 2nd century AD), Western Kshatrapas (around 150 AD), the Abhiras of Western Maharashtra, Bhojas of Goa, and the Konkan Mauryas as feudatories of the Kalachuris. The rule later passed to the Chalukyas of Badami, who controlled it between 578 and 753, and later the Rashtrakutas of Malkhed from 753 to 963. From 765 to 1015, the Southern Silharas of Konkan ruled Goa as the feudatories of the Chalukyas and the Rashtrakutas. Over the next few centuries, Goa was successively ruled by the Kadambas as the feudatories of the Chalukyas of Kalyani. They patronised Jainism in Goa.

In 1312, Goa came under the governance of the Delhi Sultanate. The kingdom's grip on the region was weak, and by 1370, it was forced to surrender it to Harihara I of the Vijayanagara Empire. The Vijayanagara monarchs held on to the territory until 1469, when it was appropriated by the Bahmani Sultanate. After that dynasty crumbled, the area fell into the hands of the Sultanate of Bijapur, who established as their auxiliary capital the city known under the Portuguese as Velha Goa (or Old Goa).

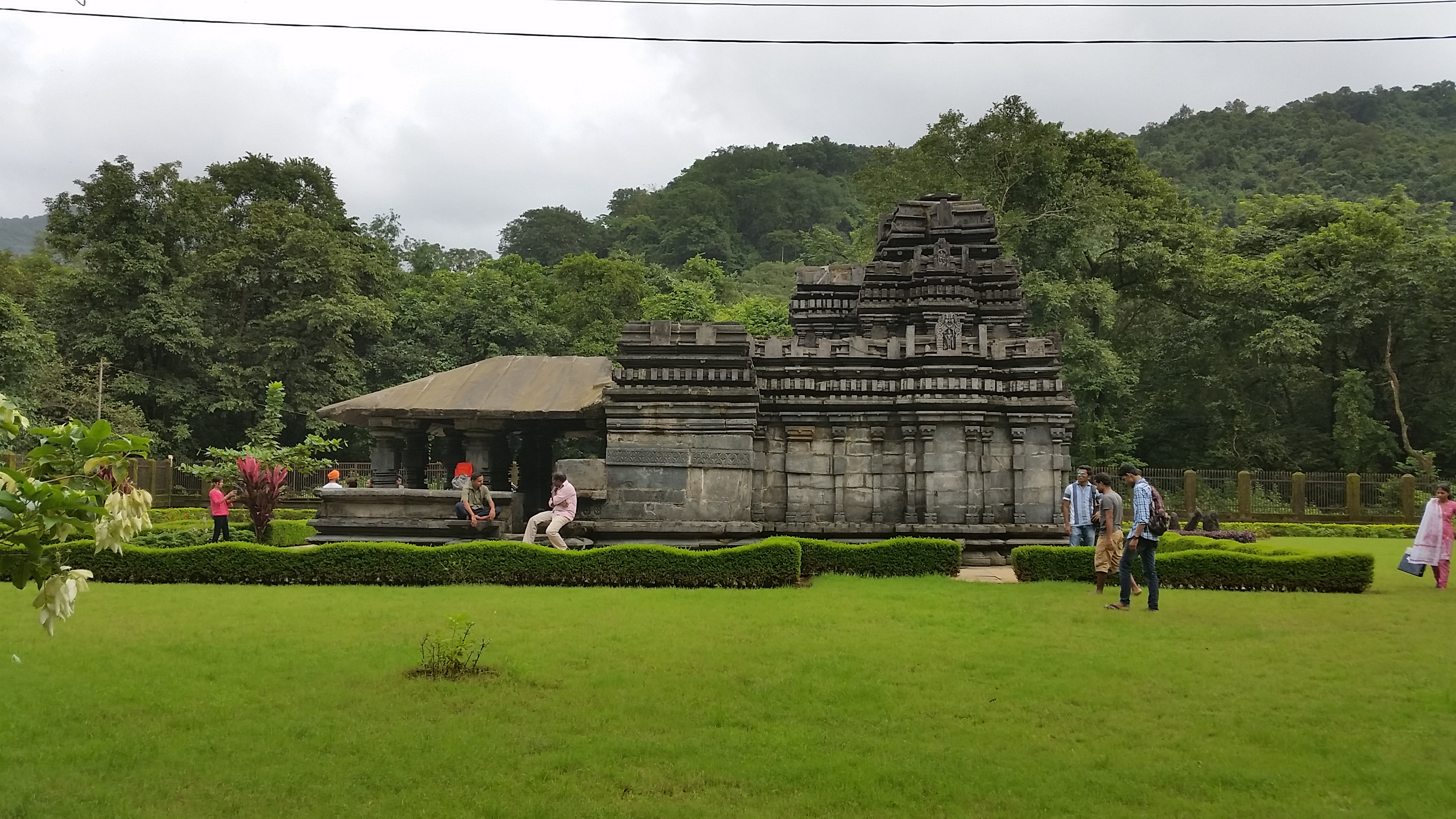
The Mahadev Temple, attributed to the Kadambas of Goa, in what is today Bhagwan Mahaveer Sanctuary and Mollem National Park

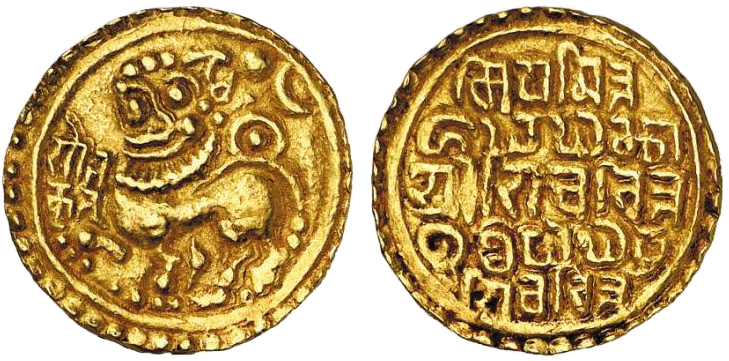
Gold coins issued by the Kadamba king of Goa, Shivachitta Paramadideva, c. 1147–1187 CE

=== Portuguese period ===
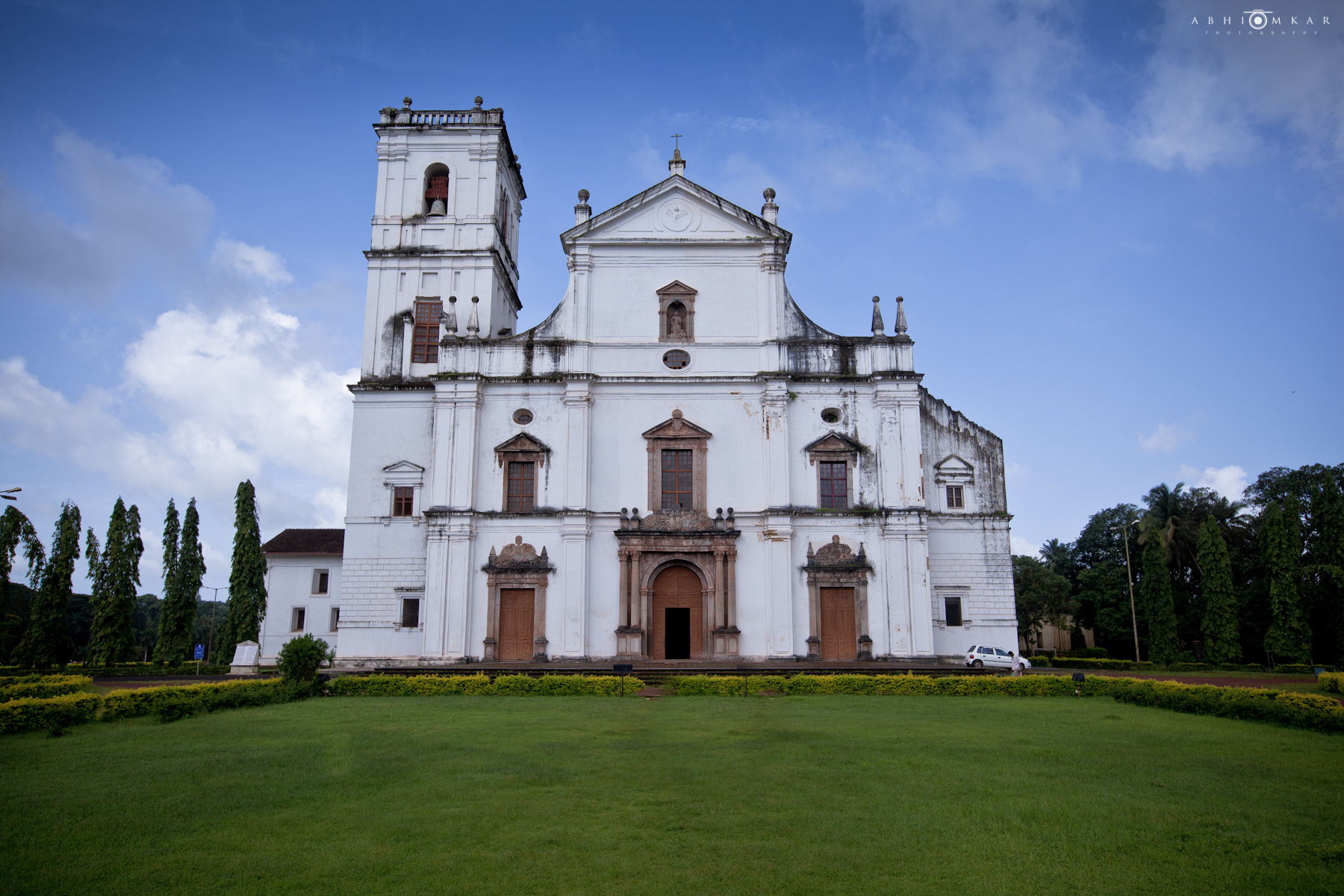
The 1619 Se Cathedral at Old Goa is an example of Portuguese architecture and is one of the largest churches in Asia.

In 1510, the Portuguese defeated the ruling Bijapur sultan Yusuf Adil Shah with the help of a local ally, Thimmayya or Timoji, a privateer. They set up a permanent settlement in Velha Goa (Old Goa). This was the beginning of Portuguese colonial rule in Goa that would last for four and a half centuries, until its annexation by India in 1961. The Goa Inquisition, a formal tribunal, was established in 1560, and was finally abolished in 1812. Alongside the Portuguese, the Croatian Republic of Ragusa maintained a small colonial settlement – Sao Braz – in the Goan village of Gandaulim during this time.

From the latter decades of the eighteenth century, the territory of Goa was composed of two segments: the central nucleus of the Velhas Conquistas (Old Conquests)—Bardez, Ilhas de Goa, and Salcete—which had been under Portuguese administration since the sixteenth century; and the Novas Conquistas (New Conquests)—Bicholim, Canacona, Pernem, Quepem, Sattari, and Sanguem—which were successively incorporated during the eighteenth century.

In 1787, Goa experienced its first revolt from its Catholic elite, with the Pinto Revolt led by a Goan noble family who revolted against the Portuguese due to racial discrimination in administration and clergy. They were betrayed by a member of the revolt. The Portuguese government executed some of the family members, while others, such as Abbe Faria, went on to join the French Revolution. This remains legend in Goa today.

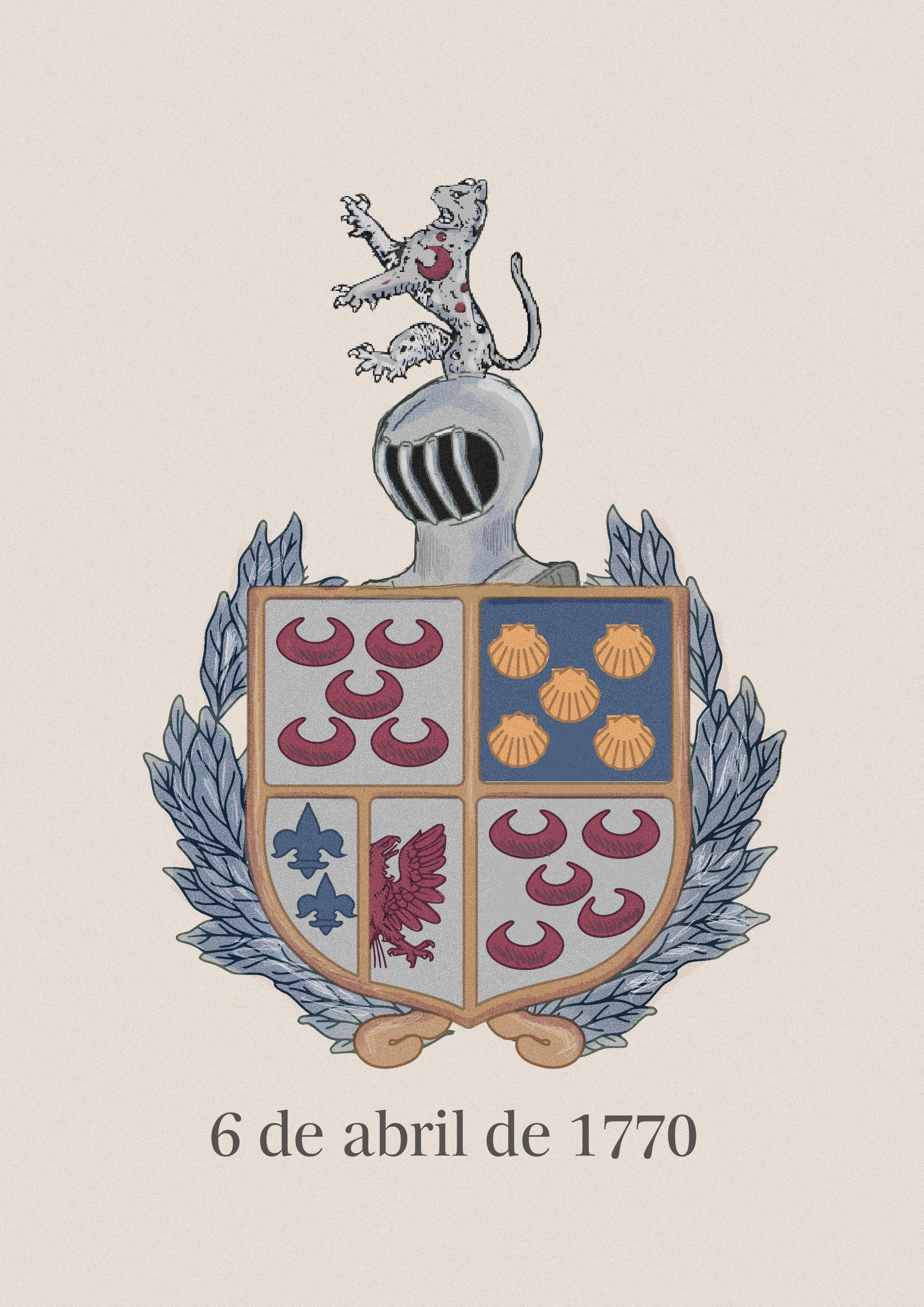
Coat of Arms of the Pintos, awarded by the King of Portugal in 1770

In 1843, the Portuguese moved the capital to the Cidade da Nova Goa (City of New Goa), today known as Panaji (Panjim), from Velha Goa (Old Goa). By the mid-18th century, Portuguese expansions lost other possessions in India until their borders stabilised and formed the Goa, Daman and Diu, which included Silvassa prior to the Annexation, it was known as Estado da Índia in Portuguese.

Some wealthy Goan zamindars such as Baron Dempo and Viscount Deshprabhu were included in the Portuguese nobility, and were among the richest men in Independent India due to the mineral wealth of Goa.

=== Contemporary period ===
On 18 June 1946, a day now celebrated as Goa Revolution Day, Ram Manohar Lohia visited Margao and delivered a speech, urging Goans to fight for their independence, triggering the Goan independence movement. After India gained independence from British rule in 1947, India requested that Portuguese territories on the Indian subcontinent be ceded to India. Portugal refused to negotiate on the sovereignty of its Indian enclaves. On 19 December 1961, the Indian Army invaded with Operation Vijay resulting in the annexation of Goa, and of Daman and Diu islands into the Indian union. Goa, Daman and Diu, were organised as a single centrally administered union territory of India. On 16 January 1967 a referendum was held in Goa, to decide the future of the Union Territory of Goa, Daman and Diu. It was the only referendum to have been held in independent India. The referendum offered the people of Goa a choice between continuing as a union territory or merging with the state of Maharashtra and the majority chose the former. On 30 May 1987, the union territory was split, and Goa was made India's twenty-fifth state, with Daman and Diu remaining a union territory.

== Geography ==
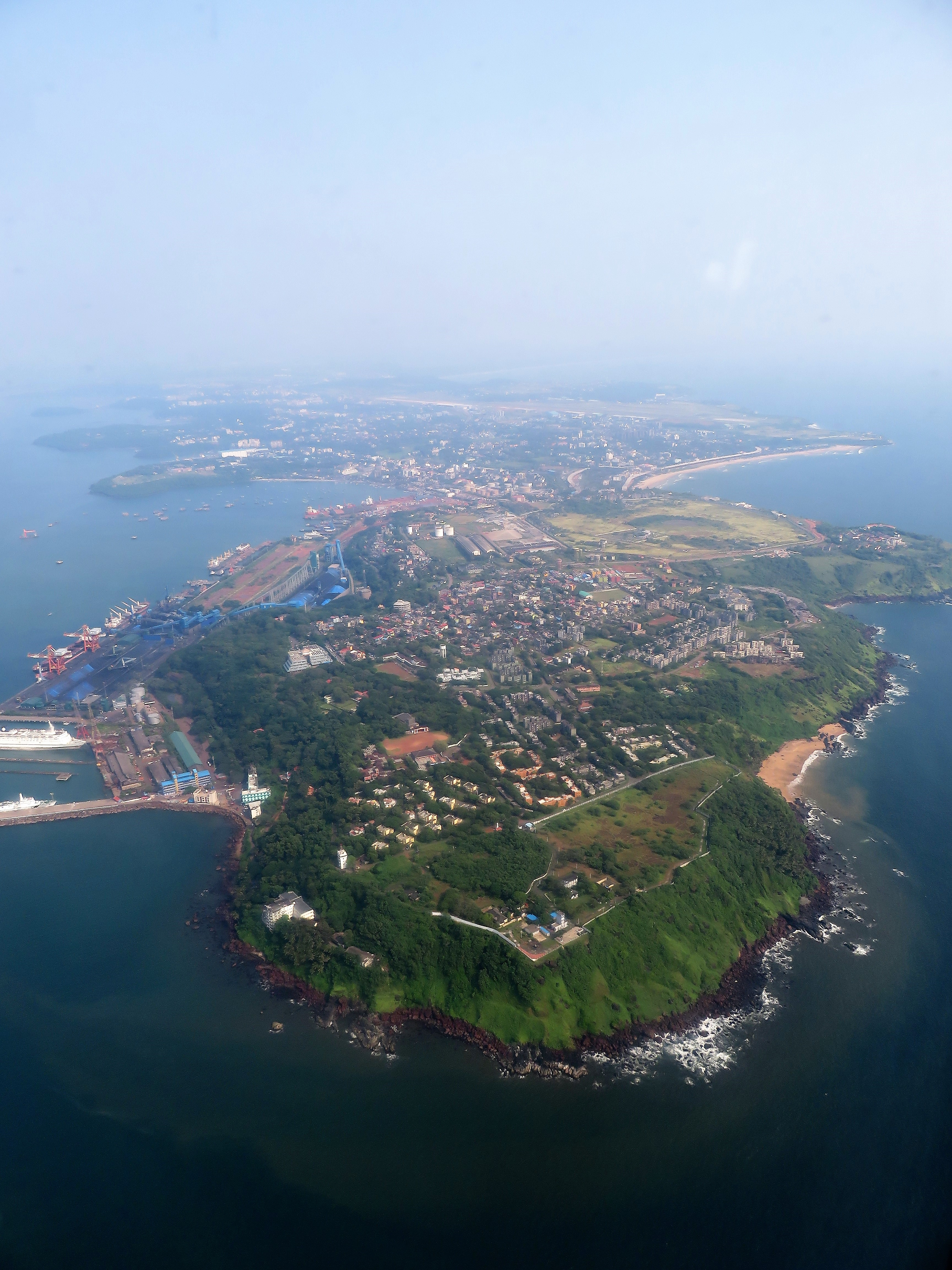
Picture of coastline of Vasco da Gama, Goa, taken from an aircraft's window

Goa encompasses an area of 3,702 km^{2} (1,429 sq mi). It lies between the latitudes 14°53′54″ N and 15°40′00″ N and longitudes 73°40′33″ E and 74°20′13″ E.

Most of Goa is part of the Konkan region along India's western coast. The Western Ghats separate the region from the Deccan Plateau. Sonsogor, at an elevation of 1,167 metres (3,829 ft), is the highest point in Goa.

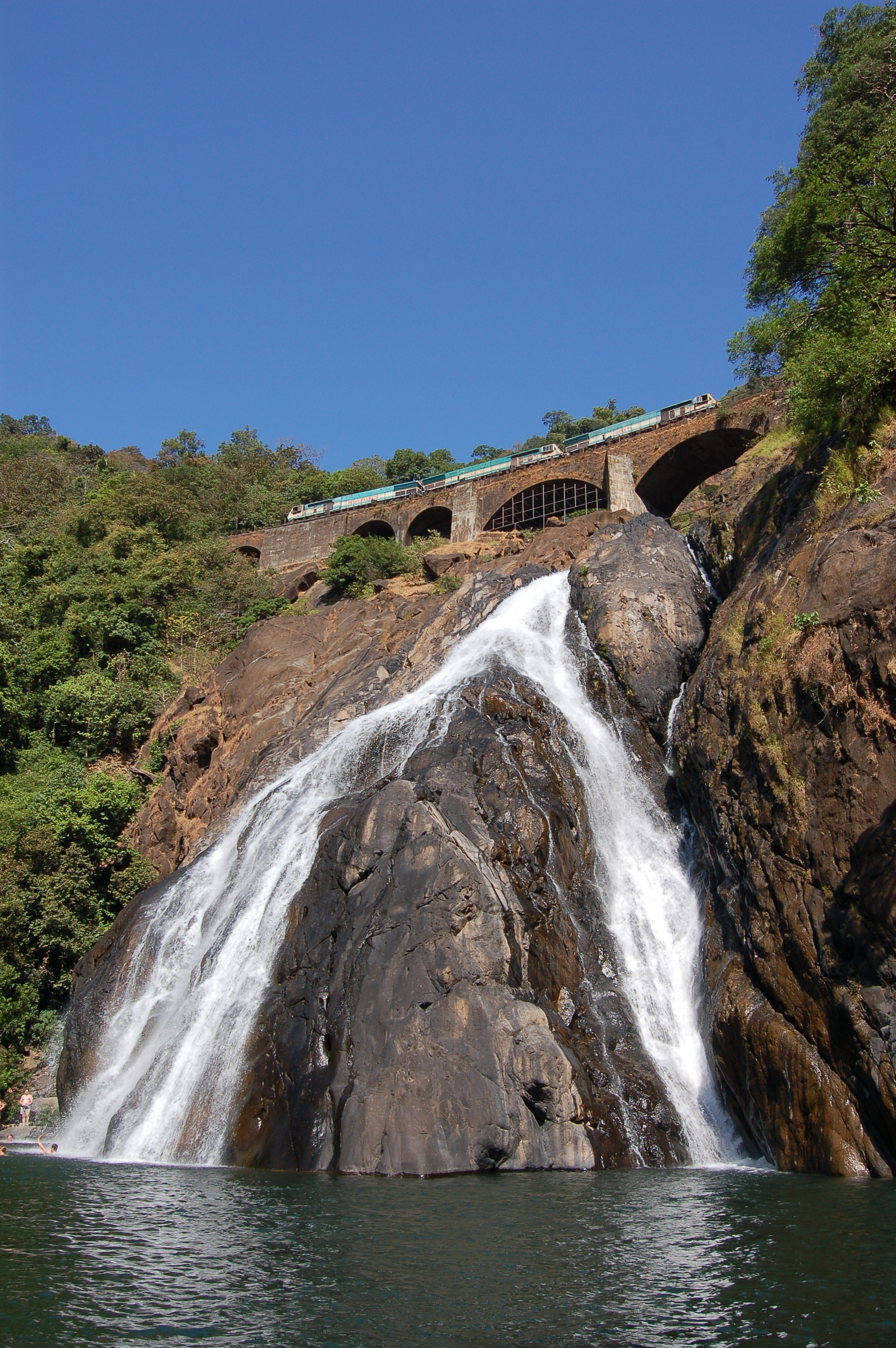
Lower half of Dudhsagar Falls

Goa's seven major rivers are the Mandovi, Zuari, Terekhol, Chapora, Galgibag, Cumbarjua canal, Talpona, and the Sal. The Zuari and the Mandovi are the most important rivers, interspaced by the Cumbarjua canal, forming a major estuarine complex. These rivers are fed by the Southwest monsoon rain and their basin covers 69% of the state's geographical area. These rivers are some of the busiest in India. Goa has more than 40 estuarine, eight marine, and about 90 riverine islands. The total navigable length of Goa's rivers is 253 km (157 mi). Goa has more than 300 ancient water tanks built during the rule of the Kadamba dynasty and over 100 medicinal springs.

Mormugao Harbour, at the mouth of the Zuari River, is considered one of the best natural harbours in South Asia.

Most of Goa's soil cover is made up of laterites rich in ferric-aluminium oxides and reddish in colour. Further inland and along the riverbanks, the soil is mostly alluvial and loamy. The soil is rich in minerals and humus, thus conducive to agriculture. Some of the oldest rocks in the Indian subcontinent are found in Goa between Molem and Anmod on Goa's border with Karnataka. The rocks are classified as Trondjemeitic Gneiss estimated to be 3,600 million years old, dated by rubidium isotope dating. A specimen of the rock is exhibited at Goa University.

=== Climate ===
Goa features an extreme tropical monsoon climate under the Köppen climate classification. Being in the torrid zone and near the Arabian Sea, the state has a hot and humid climate for most of the year. The month of May is usually the hottest, seeing daytime temperatures of over 35 °C (95 °F) coupled with high humidity due to proximity to the sea. Due to high humidity, the feels-like temperature may reach 48 °C or 118.4 °F during summer afternoons, which can cause severe discomfort and excessive sweating. Goa's three seasons are southwest monsoon period (June–September), post-monsoon period (October–January), and pre-monsoon period (February–May). Over 90 per cent of the average annual rainfall (3,048 mm or 120 in) is received during the monsoon season.

Climate data for Goa
Month	Jan	Feb	Mar	Apr	May	Jun	Jul	Aug	Sep	Oct	Nov	Dec	Year
Mean daily maximum °C (°F)	31.6 (88.9)	31.5 (88.7)	32.0 (89.6)	33.0 (91.4)	33.0 (91.4)	30.3 (86.5)	28.9 (84.0)	28.8 (83.8)	29.5 (85.1)	31.6 (88.9)	32.8 (91.0)	32.4 (90.3)	31.3 (88.3)
Daily mean °C (°F)	26.0 (78.8)	26.3 (79.3)	27.7 (81.9)	29.3 (84.7)	30.0 (86.0)	27.6 (81.7)	26.7 (80.1)	26.4 (79.5)	26.9 (80.4)	27.9 (82.2)	27.6 (81.7)	26.6 (79.9)	27.4 (81.4)
Mean daily minimum °C (°F)	19.6 (67.3)	20.5 (68.9)	23.2 (73.8)	25.6 (78.1)	26.3 (79.3)	24.7 (76.5)	24.1 (75.4)	24.0 (75.2)	23.8 (74.8)	23.8 (74.8)	22.3 (72.1)	20.6 (69.1)	23.2 (73.8)
Average rainfall mm (inches)	0.2 (0.01)	0.1 (0.00)	1.2 (0.05)	11.8 (0.46)	112.7 (4.44)	868.2 (34.18)	994.8 (39.17)	512.7 (20.19)	251.9 (9.92)	124.8 (4.91)	30.9 (1.22)	16.7 (0.66)	2,926 (115.2)
Average rainy days	0.0	0.0	0.1	0.8	4.2	21.9	27.2	13.3	13.5	6.2	2.5	0.4	90.1
Mean monthly sunshine hours	313.1	293.8	291.4	288.0	297.6	126.0	105.4	120.9	177.0	248.0	273.0	300.7	2,834.9
Source 1: World Meteorological Organization
Source 2: Hong Kong Observatory for sunshine and mean temperatures

=== Flora and fauna ===
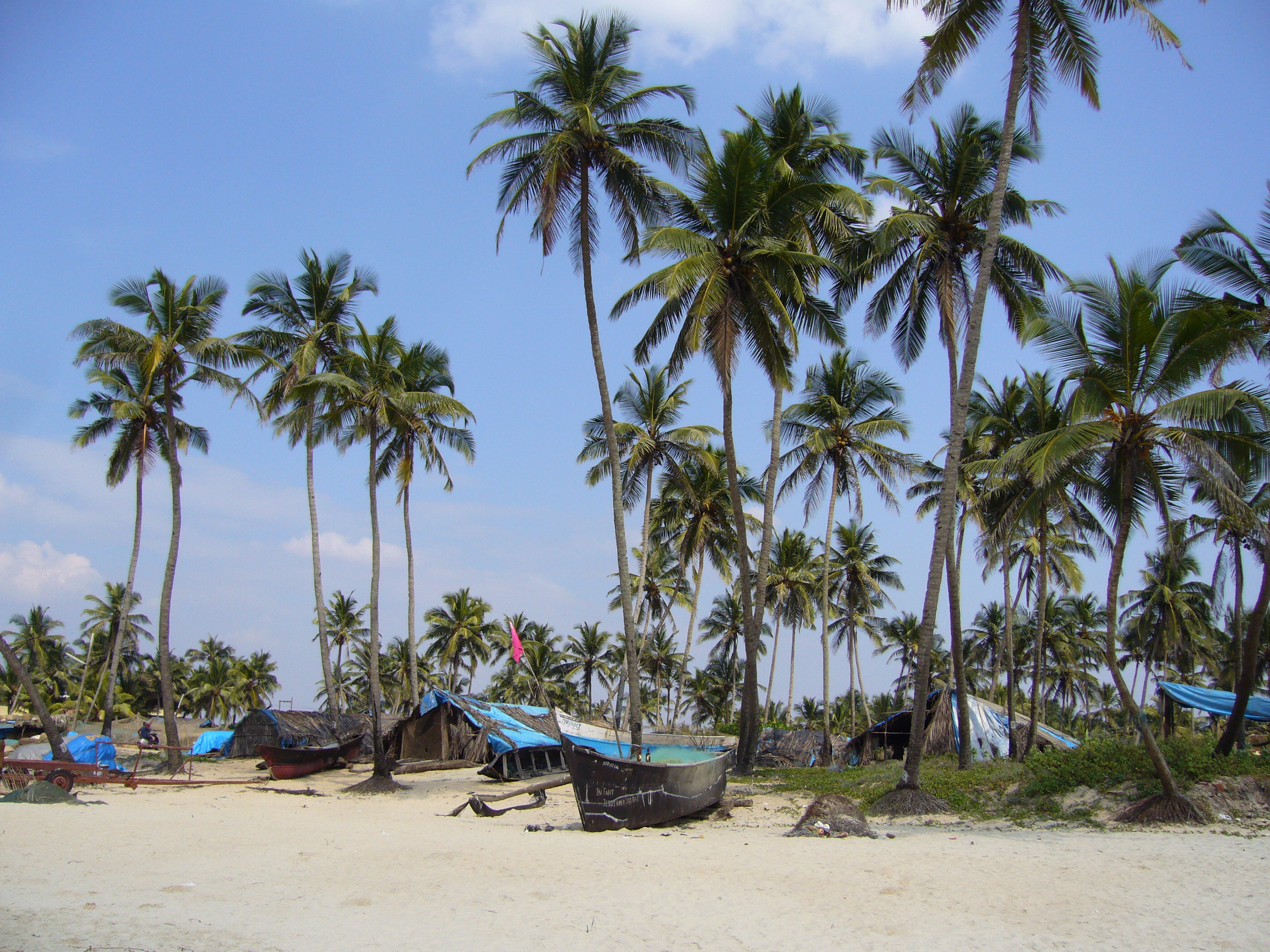
Coconut palms are a ubiquitous sight statewide.

Equatorial forest cover in Goa stands at 1,500 km^{2} (579 sq mi), most of which is owned by the government. Government-owned forest is estimated at 1,300 km^{2} (502 sq mi) while private is given as 200 km^{2} (77 sq mi). Most of the forests in the state are located in the interior eastern regions of the state. The Western Ghats, which form most of eastern Goa, have been internationally recognised as one of the biodiversity hotspots of the world. In the February 1999 issue of National Geographic Magazine, Goa was compared with the Amazon and the Congo basins for its rich tropical biodiversity.

Goa's wildlife sanctuaries boast of more than 1512 documented species of plants, over 275 species of birds, over 48 kinds of animals and over 60 genera of reptiles. Nanda Lake is the first and the only Ramsar wetland site in Goa.

Goa is also known for its coconut cultivation. The coconut tree has been reclassified by the government as a palm (like grass), enabling farmers and real estate developers to clear land with fewer restrictions.

Rice is the main food crop, and pulses (legume), ragi (finger millet), and other food crops are also grown. Main cash crops are arecanut, coconut, cashew nut, sugarcane, and fruits like banana, mango, and pineapple. Goa's state animal is the gaur, the state bird is the flame-throated bulbul, and the state tree is the Indian laurel.

The important forest products are bamboo canes, Maratha barks, chillar barks, and the bhirand. Coconut palm trees are common throughout Goa barring the elevated regions. A variety of deciduous trees, such as teak, Sal tree, cashew, and mango trees are present. Fruits include jackfruit, mango, pineapple, and blackberry. Goa's forests are rich in medicinal plants.

Foxes, wild boar and migratory birds are found in the jungles of Goa. The avifauna (bird species) includes kingfisher, myna and parrot. Numerous types of fish are also caught off the coast of Goa and in its rivers. Crab, lobster, shrimp, jellyfish, oysters, and catfish are the basis of the marine fishery. Goa also has a high snake population. Goa has many famous national parks, including the renowned Salim Ali Bird Sanctuary on the island of Chorão. Other wildlife sanctuaries include the Bondla Wildlife Sanctuary, Molem Wildlife Sanctuary, Cotigao Wildlife Sanctuary, Mhadei Wildlife Sanctuary, Netravali Wildlife Sanctuary, and Mahaveer Wildlife Sanctuary.

Goa has more than 33% of its geographic area under government forests (1,224.38 km^{2} or 472.74 sq mi) of which about 62% has been brought under Protected Areas (PA) of Wildlife Sanctuaries and National Park. Since there is a substantial area under private forests and a large tract under cashew, mango, coconut, etc. plantations, the total forest and tree cover constitutes 56.6% of the geographic area.

== Demographics ==
=== Population ===
Population growth
Year	Pop.	±% p.a.
1901	475,513	—
1911	486,752	+0.23%
1921	469,494	−0.36%
1931	505,281	+0.74%
1940	540,925	+0.76%
1950	547,448	+0.12%
1960	589,997	+0.75%
1971	795,120	+2.75%
1981	1,007,749	+2.40%
1991	1,169,793	+1.50%
2001	1,347,668	+1.43%
2011	1,458,545	+0.79%

A native of Goa is called a Goan (Goenkar in Romi Konkani). Goa has a population of 1.459 million residents as of 2011, making it the fourth least populated state of India after Sikkim, Mizoram, and Arunachal Pradesh. Population density of Goa is 394 per km^{2} which is higher than national average 382 per km^{2}. Goa is the state with highest proportion of urban population with 62.17% of the population living in urban areas. The sex ratio is 973 females to 1,000 males. The birth rate was 15.70 per 1,000 people in 2007. Scheduled Castes and Scheduled Tribes make up 1.74% and 10.23% of the population respectively. As of the 2011 census, over 76% of the population was born in Goa, while just over half of migrants to the state are from the neighbouring states of Karnataka and Maharashtra. As per a 2021 report, over 50% of the permanent resident population is of non-Goan origin, outnumbering the native ethnic Goan population.

According to the NITI Aayog's Fiscal Health Index 2025, Goa ranks third with a score of 53.6.

=== Filipino community ===
As of 2022, Goa has about 200 Filipinos, primarily women who settled after marrying Goans who had worked abroad. They formed the Fil-Goan community, with Marissa A. D’Souza serving as its first president.

=== Russian community ===
Goa attracts a significant number of Russian visitors. In 2013, approximately 103 Russians were settled in the state. They are primarily based in North Goa, particularly in the coastal town of Morjim, which is also known as "Little Russia" due to the sizeable Russian community residing there and operating local businesses.

The first Russian arrivals in Goa were reported around the year 2000. According to media sources, approximately 300,000 to 400,000 Russian tourists travel to Goa annually. This number has reportedly declined following the COVID-19 pandemic and the 2022 Russian invasion of Ukraine.

Some reports have also linked Russian nationals to drug-related activities. In 2025, the Morjim panchayat raised concerns regarding Russian-language public signages installed in the town.

=== Languages ===
Languages in Goa (2011)
1. Konkani (66.1%)
2. Marathi (10.9%)
3. Hindi (8.64%)
4. Kannada (4.65%)
5. Urdu (2.82%)
6. Others (6.92%)

The Official Language Act, 1987, of the erstwhile Union Territory of Goa, Daman and Diu makes Konkani in the Devanagari script the sole official language of Goa, but provides that Marathi may also be used "for all or any of the official purposes". Portuguese was the sole official language during Portuguese colonial rule, but its use has declined drastically since the annexation of the territory by India. The government also has a policy of replying in Marathi to correspondence received in Marathi. There have been demands for according Konkani in the Roman script (Roman Konkani) official status in the state. Proponents of Roman Konkani opine that the Official Language Act, 1987 sidelines Roman Konkani. There is widespread support for maintaining Konkani as the sole official language of Goa.

Konkani is spoken as a first language by about 66.11% of the people in the state, but almost all Goans can speak and understand Konkani. A large percentage of the population is proficient in English as well. Other linguistic groups with significant population in the state per the 2011 census are speakers of Marathi (10.89%), Hindi (8.64%), Kannada (4.65%) and Urdu (2.82%).

Historically, Konkani was neither the official nor the administrative language of the many rulers of the State. Under the Kadambas (c. 960–1310), the court language was Kannada. When under Muslim rule (1312–1370 and 1469–1510), the official and cultural language was Persian. Various stones in the Archaeological Museum and Portrait Gallery from the period are inscribed in Kannada and Persian. During the period in between the two periods of Muslim rule, the Vijayanagara Empire, which had control of the state, mandated the use of Kannada and Telugu.

=== Religion ===
Religion in Goa (2011)
1. Hinduism (66.1%)
2. Christianity (25.1%)
3. Islam (8.33%)
4. Sikhism (0.10%)
5. Other or not religious (0.39%)

Religious composition of Goa
Religion	2011 Population	%
Hinduism	964,305	66.08
Christianity	366,130	25.10
Islam	121,564	8.33
Sikhism	1,473	0.10
Jainism	793	0.05
Buddhism	15	0.00
Other religions and persuasions	3,673	0.25
Religion not stated	4,592	0.31
Total	1,458,545	100

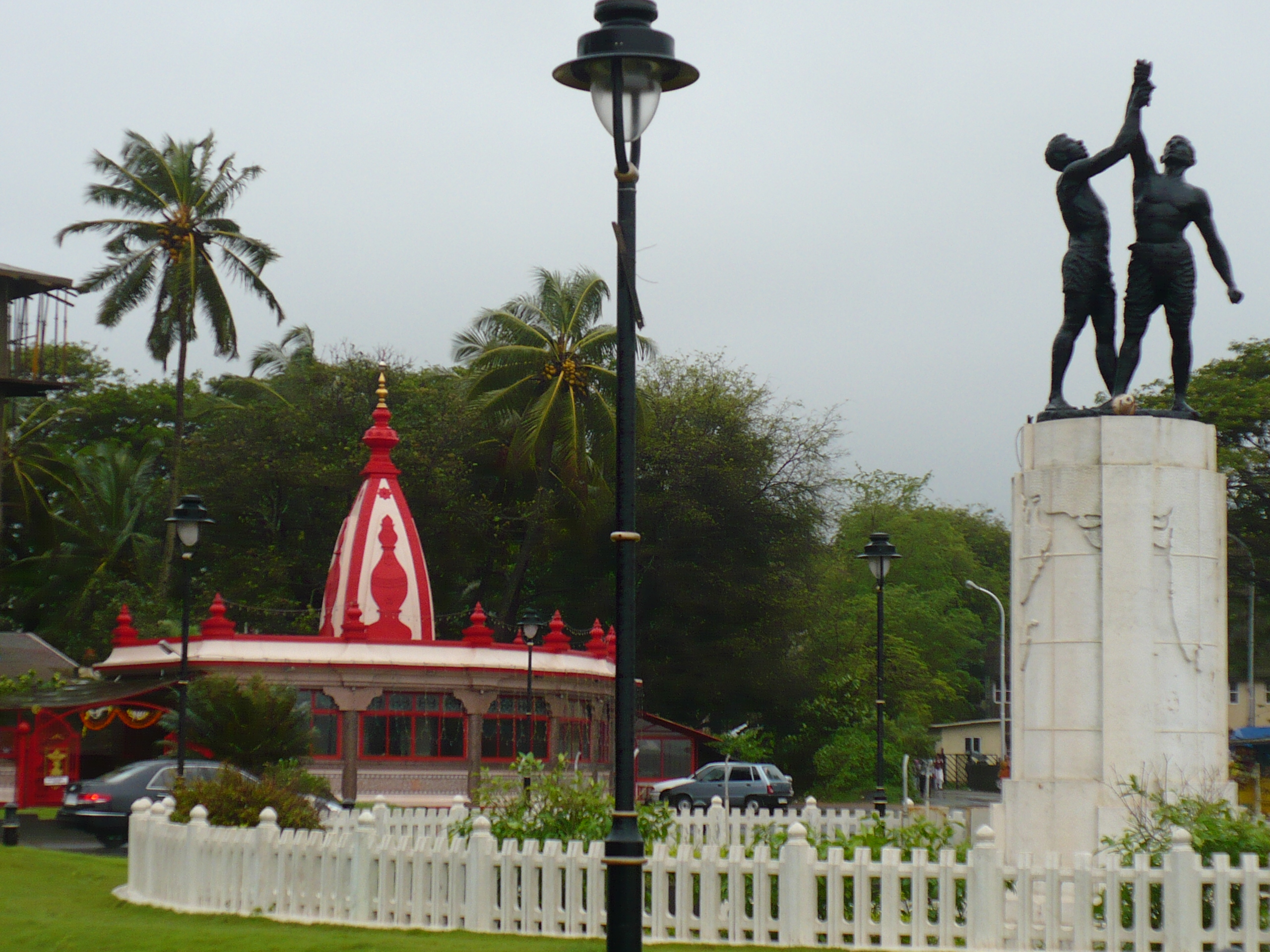
Hindu–Christian Unity Memorial at Miramar Beach

According to the 2011 census, in a population of 1,458,545 people, 66.1% were Hindu, 25.1% were Christian, 8.3% were Muslim, and 0.1% were Sikh. However, in September 2024, Goa Governor P.S. Sreedharan Pillai stated that the Muslim population of Goa has increased from 3% to 12% while the Christian population decreased from 36% to 25%. He later clarified that his remarks referred to "brain drain" and were not intended as a commentary on religious demographics.

In 1909, the Catholic Encyclopedia documented the total Catholic population in Portuguese Goa as 293,628 out of a total population of 365,291 (80.33%). Due to the Christianisation of Goa, over 90% of the Goans in the Velhas Conquistas became Catholic by the 1700s. The Novas Conquistas, which came under Portuguese rule later, remained majority Hindu. Since the 20th century, the percentage of Goan Catholics has gradually declined caused by a combination of permanent emigration from Goa to cosmopolitan Indian cities (e.g. Mumbai, Pune, Bangalore) and foreign countries (e.g. Portugal, the United Kingdom) with the mass immigration of non-Christians from the rest of India since the 20th century. By 2021, ethnic Goans accounted for less than half of the state's residents.

The Catholics in Goa state and Daman and Diu union territory are served by the Metropolitan Roman Catholic Archdiocese of Goa and Daman, the primatial see of India, in which the titular Patriarchate of the East Indies is vested.

== Government and politics ==
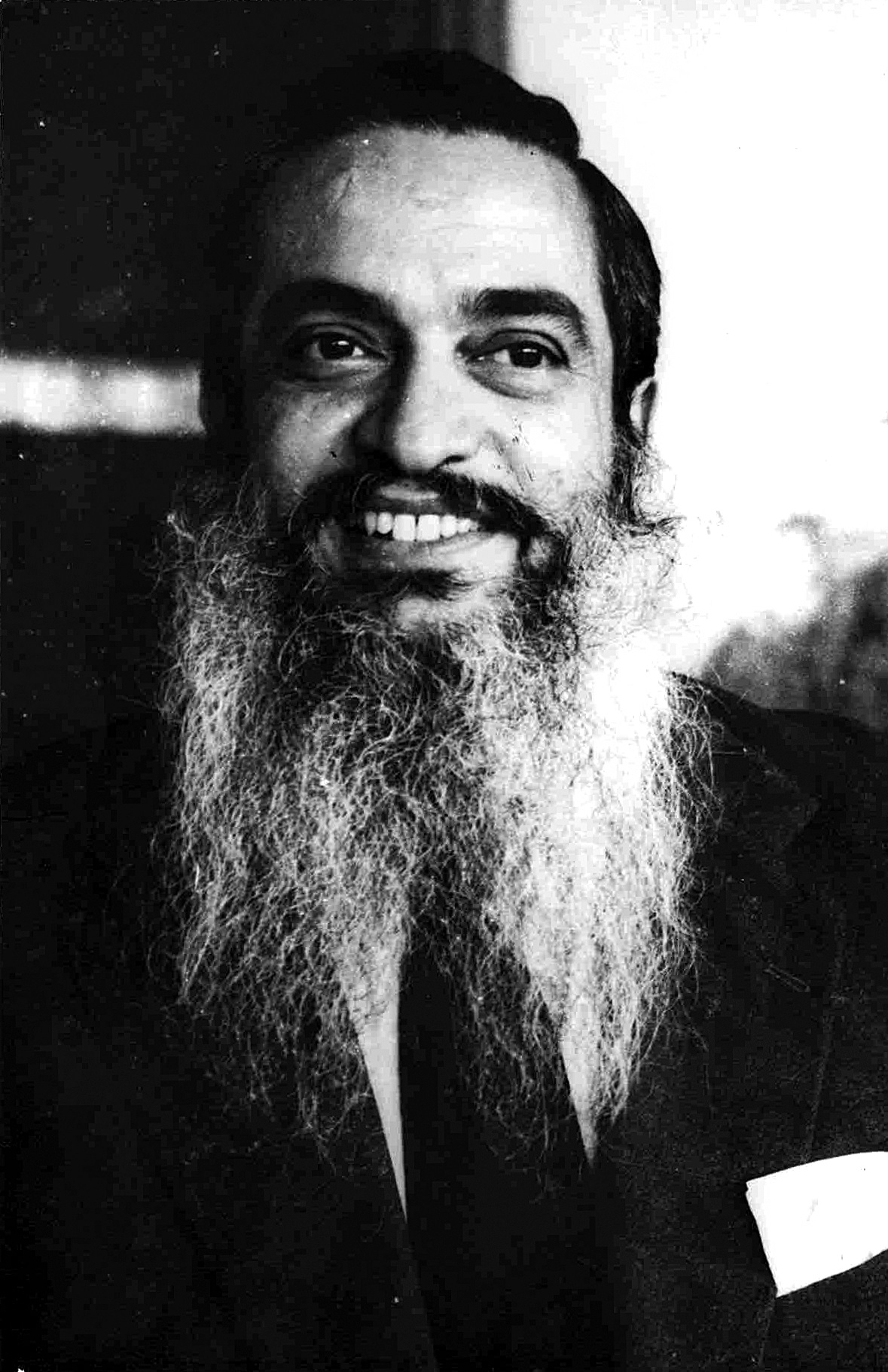
Jack de Sequeira, the father of the Goan referendum

The politics of Goa are a result of the uniqueness of this region due to 450 years of Portuguese rule, in comparison to two centuries of British rule experienced by most of the rest of India. The Indian National Congress was unable to achieve electoral success in the first two decades after the State's incorporation into India. Instead, the state was dominated by the regional political parties like Maharashtrawadi Gomantak Party and the United Goans Party.

=== Government ===
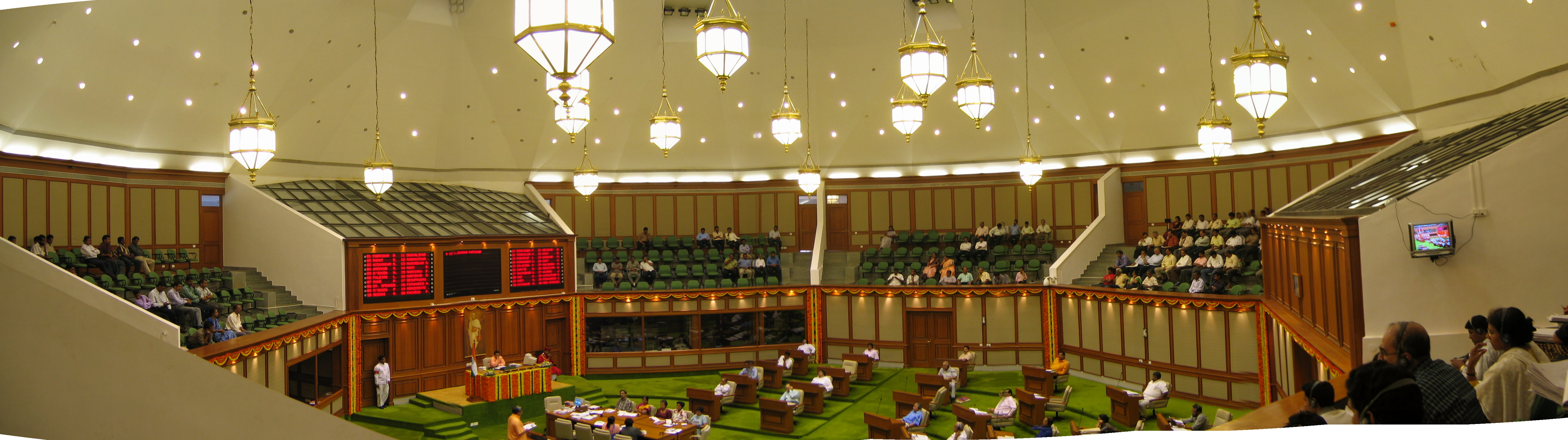
Goa Assembly

Goa has two members of parliament (MP) elected from each district representing the state in the Lok Sabha (House of the People), the lower house of the national Parliament of India. It is also has one member of parliament in the Rajya Sabha (Council of the States), the upper house of the Indian parliament.

Goa's administrative capital is based in Panaji, often referred as Panjim in English, Pangim in Portuguese and Ponjê in Konkani, the official language of the state. It lies on the left bank of the Mandovi river. The seat of the Goa Legislative Assembly is in Porvorim, across the Mandovi from Panaji. The state's highest judiciary is the Goa Bench of the Bombay High Court, a branch of the Bombay High Court permanently seated at Panjim. Unlike other states, which follow the model of personal laws framed for individual religions introduced in the days of British Raj, the Portuguese Civil Code of Goa and Damaon, a uniform code based on the Napoleonic Code was retained in Goa as well as the union territory of Damaon, Diu & Silvassa.

Goa has a unicameral legislature, the Goa Legislative Assembly, of 40 members, headed by a speaker. The Government of Goa is de jure headed by the Governor and de facto headed by the elected Chief Minister. The chief minister heads the executive, which is made up of the party or coalition elected with a majority in the legislature. The governor, the head of the state, is appointed by the president of India. After having stable governance for nearly thirty years up to 1990, Goa is now notorious for its political instability having seen fourteen governments in the span of the fifteen years between 1990 and 2005.

In March 2005, the assembly was dissolved by the Governor and President's Rule was declared, which suspended the legislature. A by-election in June 2005 saw the Indian National Congress coming back to power after winning three of the five seats that went to polls. The Congress Party and the Bharatiya Janata Party (BJP) are the two largest parties in the state. In the assembly poll of 2007, the INC-led coalition won and formed the government. In the 2012 Vidhan Sabha Elections, the Bharatiya Janata Party along with the Maharashtrawadi Gomantak Party won a clear majority, forming the new government with Manohar Parrikar as the Chief Minister. Other parties include the United Goans Democratic Party, the Nationalist Congress Party.

In the 2017 assembly elections, the Indian National Congress gained the most seats, with the BJP coming in second. However, no party was able to gain a majority in the 40 member house. The BJP was invited to form the Government by Governor Mridula Sinha. The Congress claimed the use of money power to blame its struggle on BJP and took the case to the Supreme Court. However, the Manohar Parikkar led Government was able to prove its majority in the Supreme Court mandated "floor test".

In the 2022 Goa Legislative Assembly Elections, the National Democratic Alliance (NDA) won 20 seats with support of 2 seats by MGP and 3 seats by independents while on 14 September 2022 when 8 Congress MLA switched party and joined BJP.

The current seats of NDA lies at 33 with 28 of BJP, 2 of MGP and 3 independents while the opposition Indian National Developmental Inclusive Alliance (INDIA) with 7 seats consisting of Congress at 3 seats AAP with 2 seats GFP and RGP with 1 seats each.

=== Subdivisions ===
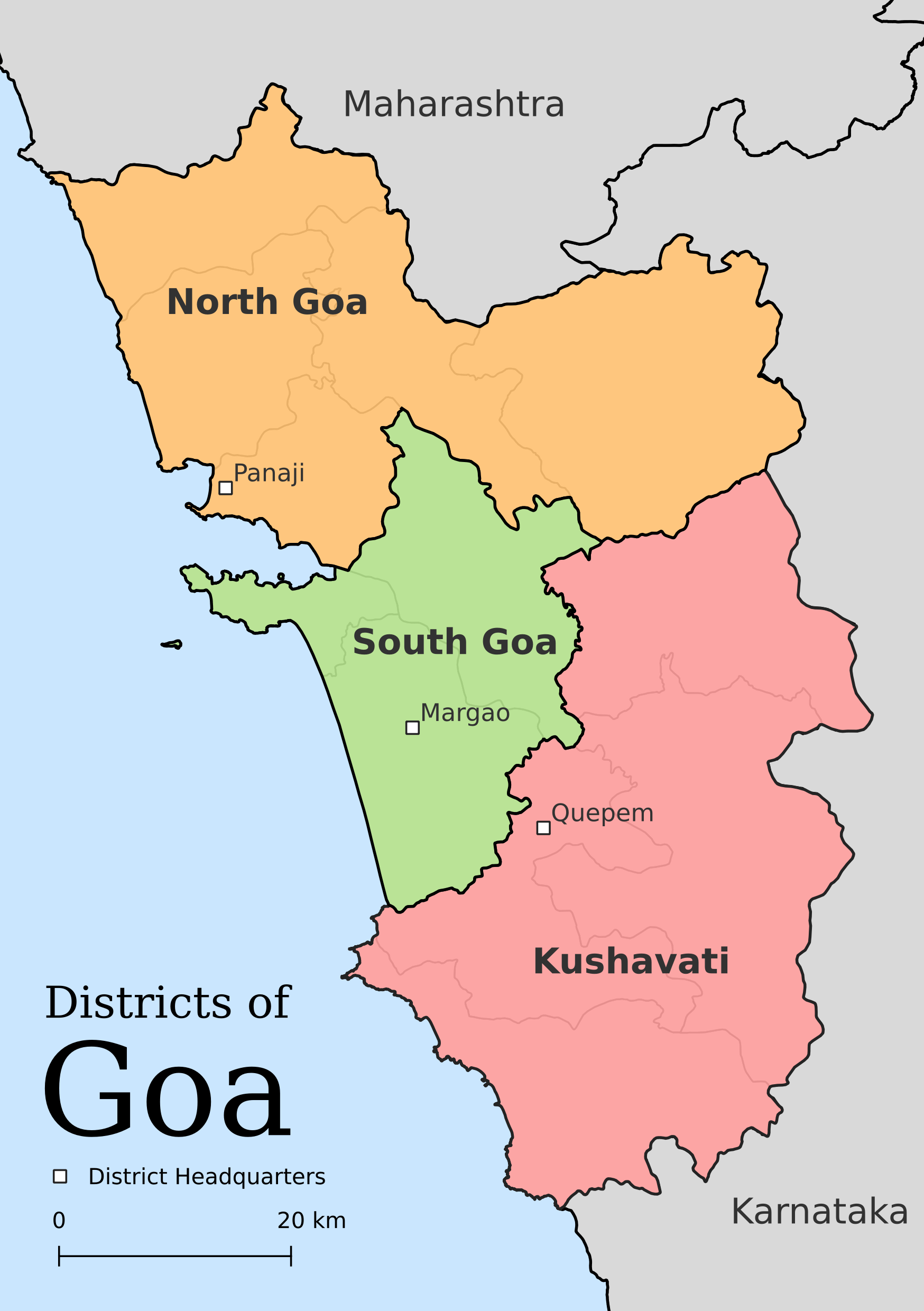
District map of Goa

The state is divided into two administrative districts—North Goa and South Goa. Each district is administered by a District Collector, appointed by the Government of Goa. These two districts are further divided into subdivisions and talukas, headed by a Deputy Collector-cum-Sub Divisional Officer and a Mamlatdar, respectively. The talukas are further divided into villages, each headed by a Talathi, who is responsible for land revenue and related matters.

Panaji (Panjim) is the headquarters of North Goa district and is also the capital of Goa. North Goa is further divided into three subdivisions—Panaji, Mapusa, and Bicholim; and five talukas (subdistricts)—Tiswadi (Panaji), Bardez (Mapusa), Pernem, Bicholim, and Sattari (Valpoi). Margao (Madgaon) is the headquarters of the South Goa district. It is also the cultural and commercial capital of Goa. South Goa is further divided into five subdivisions—Ponda, Mormugao-Vasco, Margao, Quepem, and Dharbandora; and seven talukas—Ponda, Mormugao, Salcete (Margao), Quepem, and Canacona (Chaudi), Sanguem, and Dharbandora. Goa has a total number of 334 villages.

Local government in Goa operates through a two-tier system in rural areas and urban local bodies in towns and cities. Rural local government in Goa consists of 191 Village Panchayats and two Zilla Panchayat, while urban areas are governed by 13 municipal councils and the Corporation of the City of Panaji. These local bodies are divided into wards, with representatives elected every five years.

=== Local governance ===
Goa's major cities are—Panaji, Margao, Vasco-Mormugao, Mapusa, Ponda, Bicholim, and Valpoi. Panaji (Panjim) has the only Municipal Corporation in Goa. There are thirteen Municipal Councils—Margao, Mormugao (merged with Vasco), Pernem, Mapusa, Bicholim, Sanquelim, Valpoi, Ponda, Cuncolim, Quepem, Curchorem, Sanguem, and Canacona. There are two Zilla Panchayats — South Goa and North Goa — and 191 Gram Panchayats for rural governance.

Local governance in Goa is administered through a two-tier system in rural areas and a municipal system in urban areas. Rural local bodies consist of the Zilla Panchayats at the district level and Gram Panchayats at the village level, functioning under the Goa Panchayat Raj Act, 1994. Urban areas are governed by municipal councils or municipal corporations in accordance with the Goa Municipalities Act, 1968, and the Corporation of the City of Panaji Act, 2002. These institutions are responsible for local administration, civic amenities, and community development within their respective jurisdictions.

== Economy ==
Gross state domestic product (in millions of rupees)
Year	GSDP
1980	3,980
1985	6,550
1990	12,570
1995	33,190
2000	76,980
2010	150,000

Goa's state domestic product for 2017 is estimated at $11 billion at current prices. Goa is India's richest state with the highest GDP per capita—two and a half times that of the country—with one of its fastest growth rates: 8.23% (yearly average 1990–2000). Tourism is Goa's primary industry: it gets 12% of foreign tourist arrivals in India. Goa has two main tourist seasons: winter and summer. In winter, tourists from abroad (mainly Europe) come, and summer (which, in Goa, is the rainy season) sees tourists from across India. Goa's net state domestic product (NSDP) was around US$7.24 billion in 2015–16.

The land away from the coast is rich in minerals and ores, and mining forms the second largest industry. Iron, bauxite, manganese, clays, limestone, and silica are mined. The Mormugao port handled 31.69 a million tonnes of cargo in 2007, which was 39% of India's total iron ore exports. Sesa Goa (now owned by Vedanta Resources) and Dempo are the lead miners. Rampant mining has been depleting the forest cover as well as posing a health hazard to the local population. Corporations are also mining illegally in some areas. During 2015–16, the total traffic handled by Mormugao port was recorded to be 20.78 million tonnes.

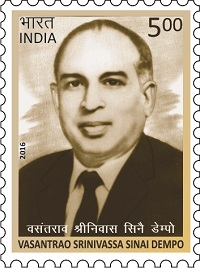
Vasantrao S. Dempo, aristocrat and Industrialist, one of Goa's wealthiest mining barons

Agriculture, while of shrinking importance to the economy over the past four decades, offers part-time employment to a sizeable portion of the populace. Rice is the main agricultural crop, followed by areca, cashew, and coconut. Fishing employs about 40,000 people, though recent official figures indicate a decline in the importance of this sector and also a fall in the catch, due perhaps, to traditional fishing giving way to large-scale mechanised trawling.

Medium-scale industries include the manufacturing of pesticides, fertilizers, tires, tubes, footwear, chemicals, pharmaceuticals, wheat products, steel rolling, fruits and fish canning, cashew nuts, textiles, brewery products.

Currently, there are 16 planned SEZs in Goa. The Goa government has recently decided to not allow any more Special Economic Zones (SEZs) in Goa after strong opposition to them by political parties and the Goa Catholic Church.

Goa is also notable for its low-priced beer, wine, and spirits prices due to its very low excise duty on alcohol. Another main source of cash inflow to the state is remittance, from many of its citizens who work abroad, to their families. It is said to have some of the largest bank savings in the country.

=== Gambling sector ===
In 1976, Goa became the first state in India to legalise some types of gambling. This enabled the state to levy taxes on gambling, strengthening the economy. Manohar Parrikar granted permanent licences to casinos in 2014. There are several casinos available in Goa. From 2018 to 2019, tax revenue from casinos reached ₹4.14 billion (equivalent to ₹5.6 billion or US$60 million in 2026).

=== Wired Infrastructure ===
Goa is the second state in India to achieve a 100 per cent automatic telephone system with a solid network of telephone exchanges. As of September 2017, Goa had a total installed power generation capacity of 547.88 MW. Goa is also one of the few states in India to achieve 100 per cent rural electrification.

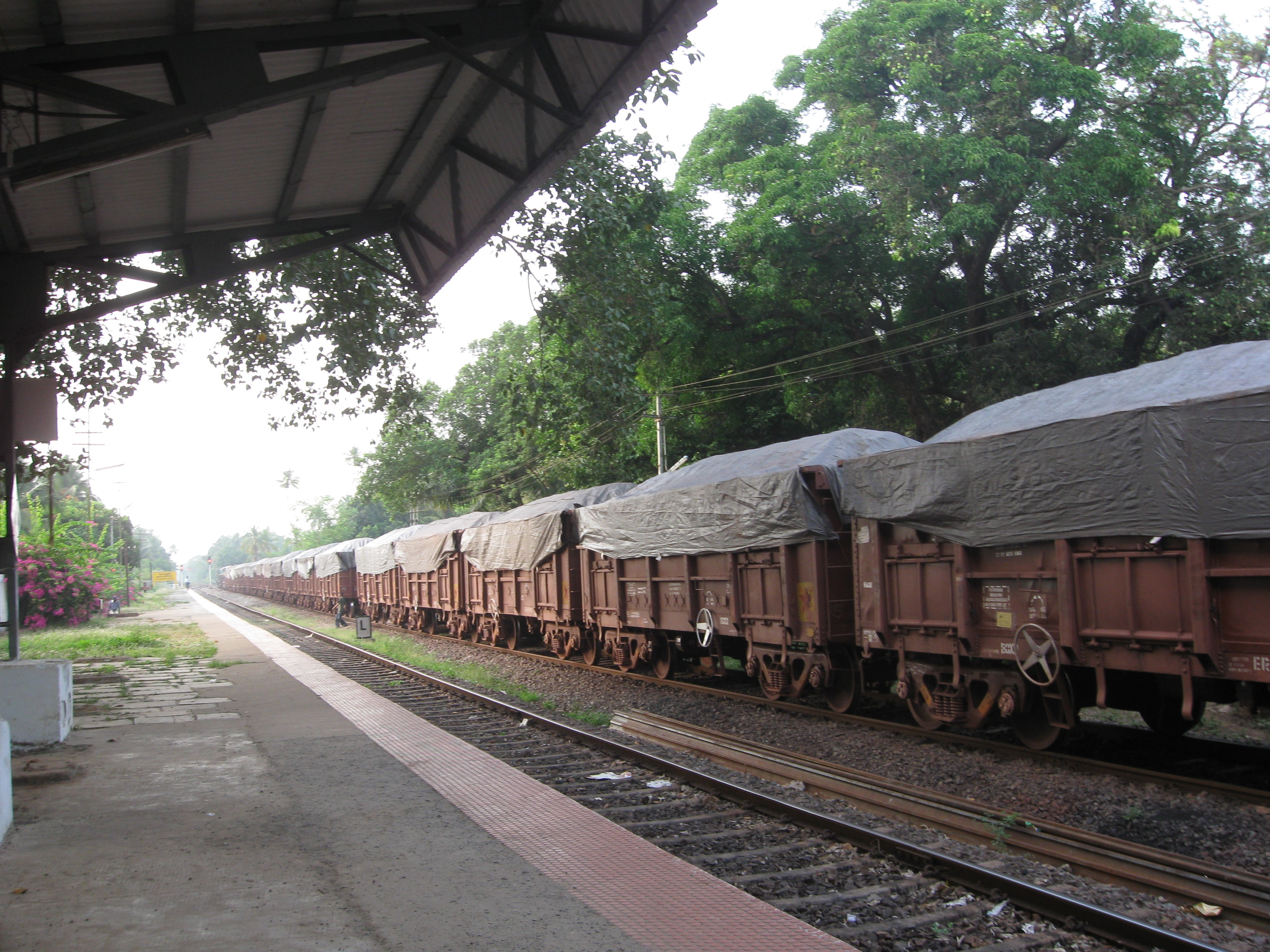
Train carrying iron ore to Marmagao Port, Vasco

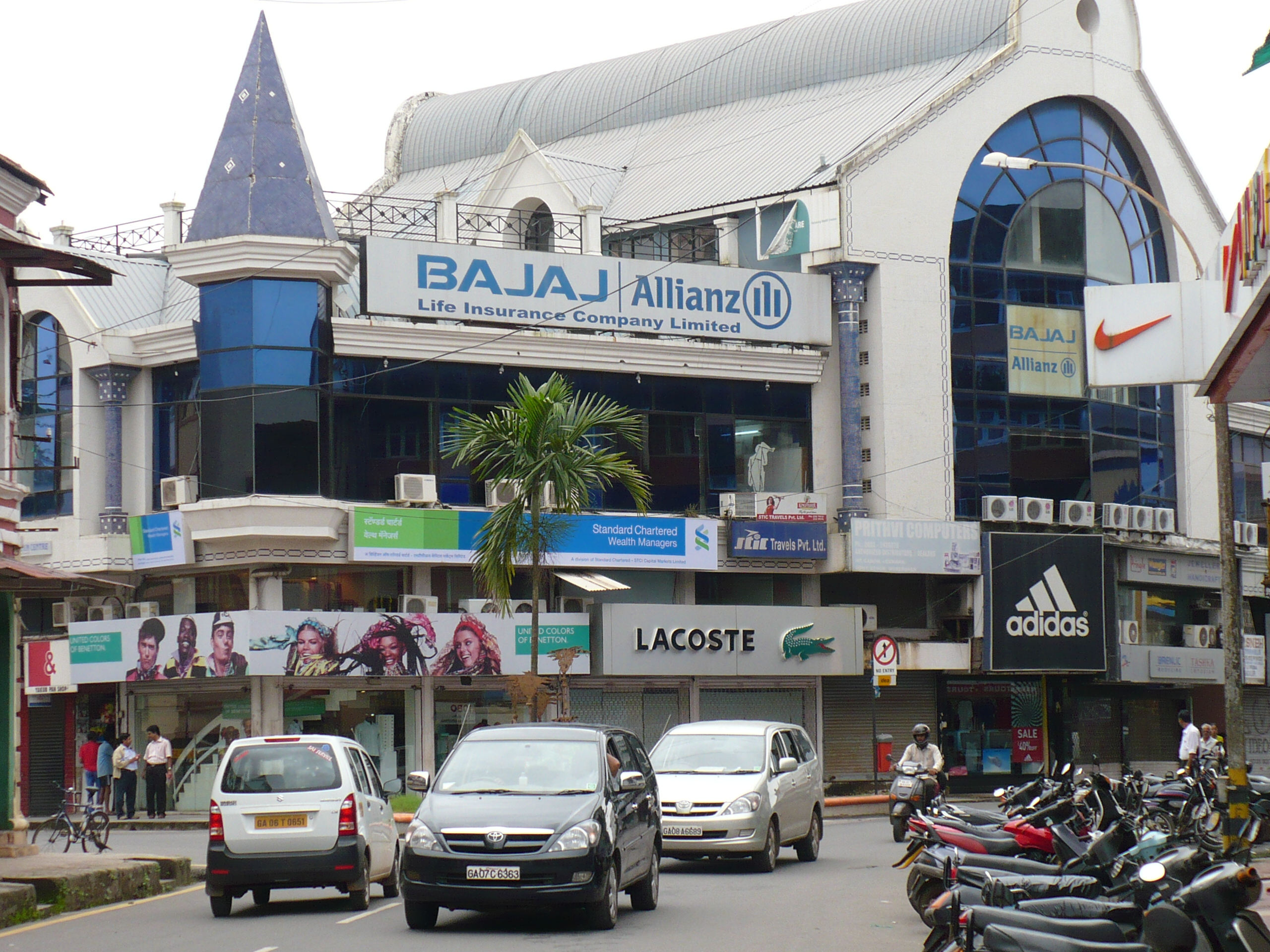
Commercial area in Panaji

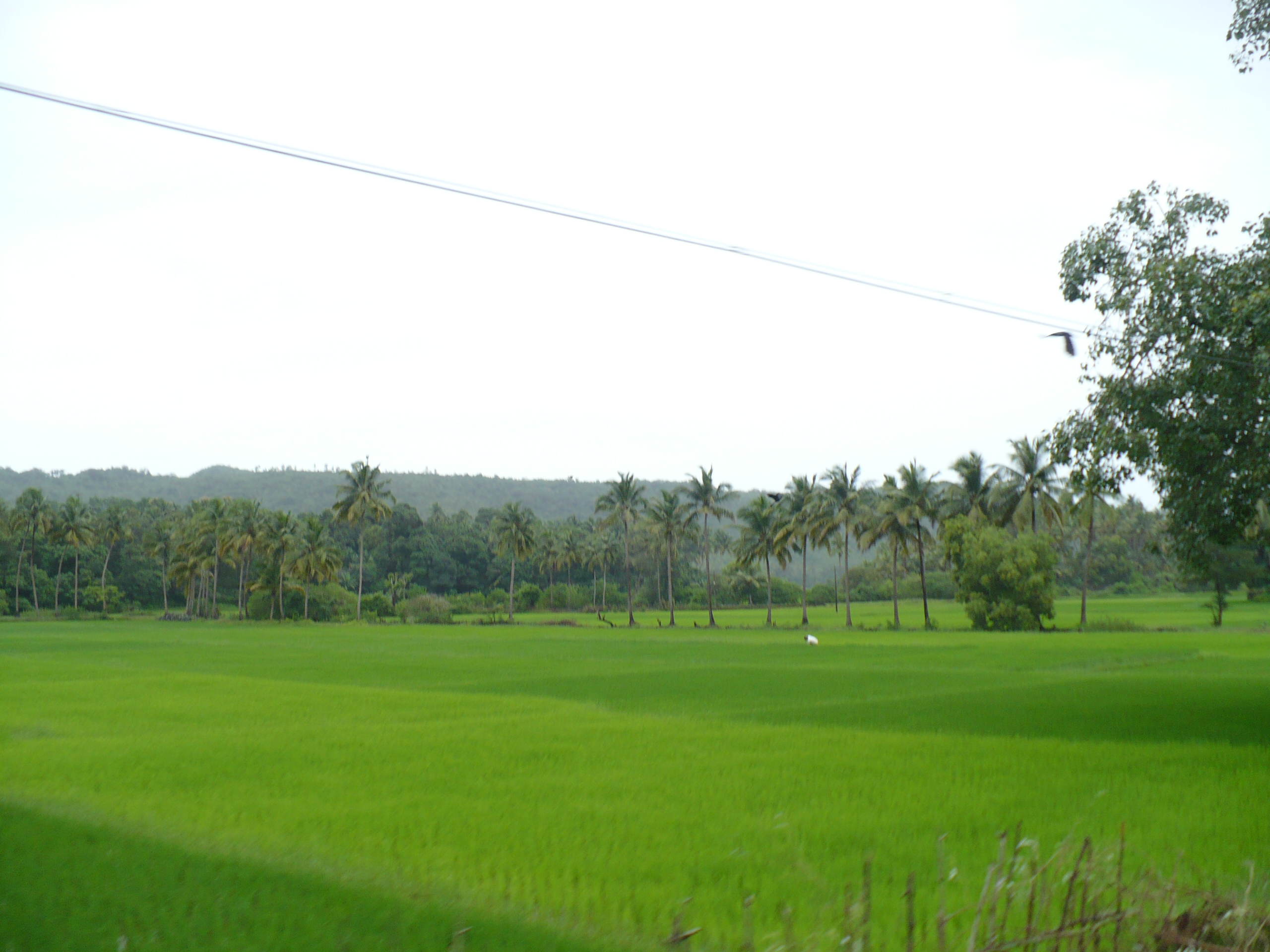
Rice paddies are common in rural Goa

== Tourism ==
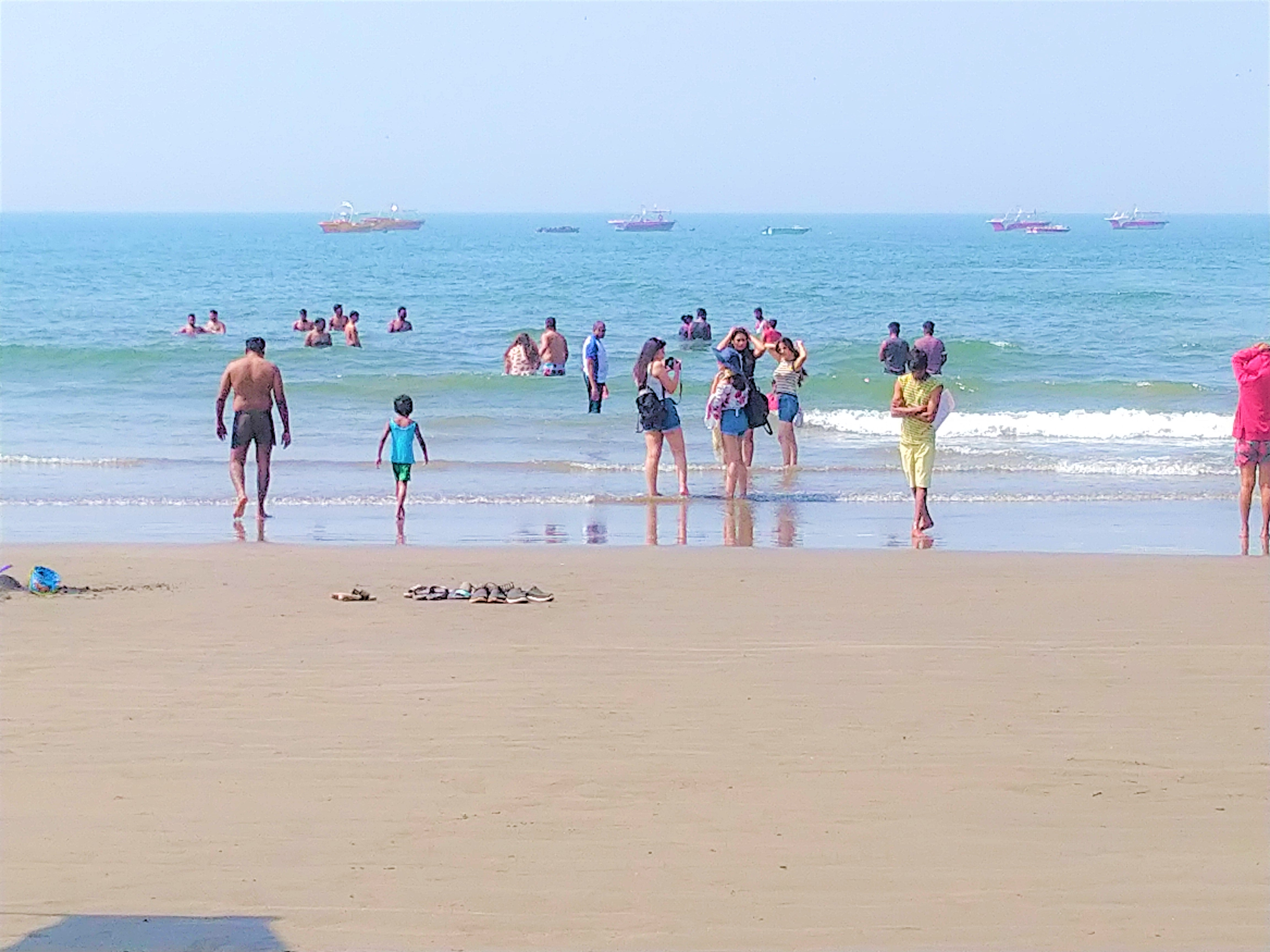
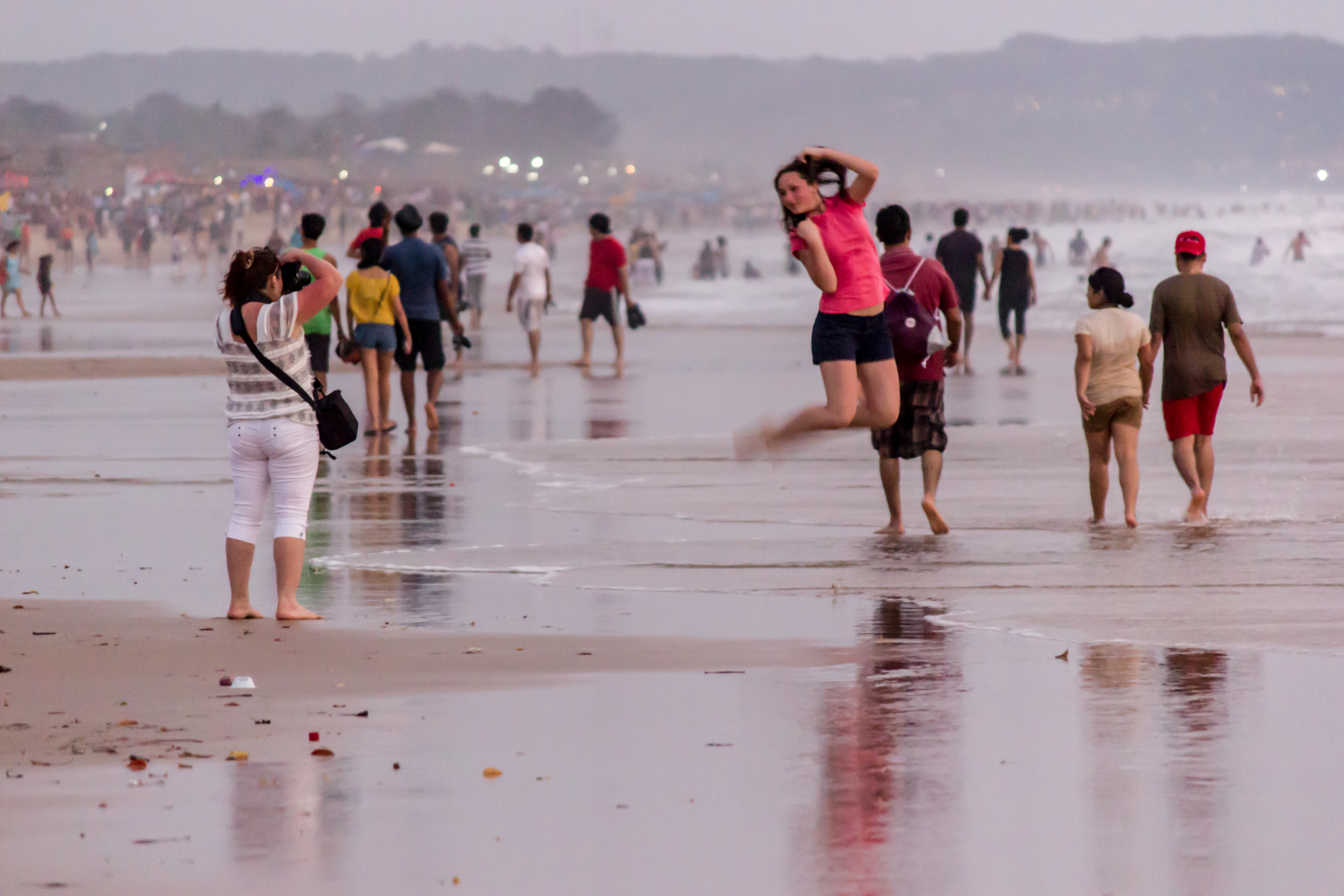
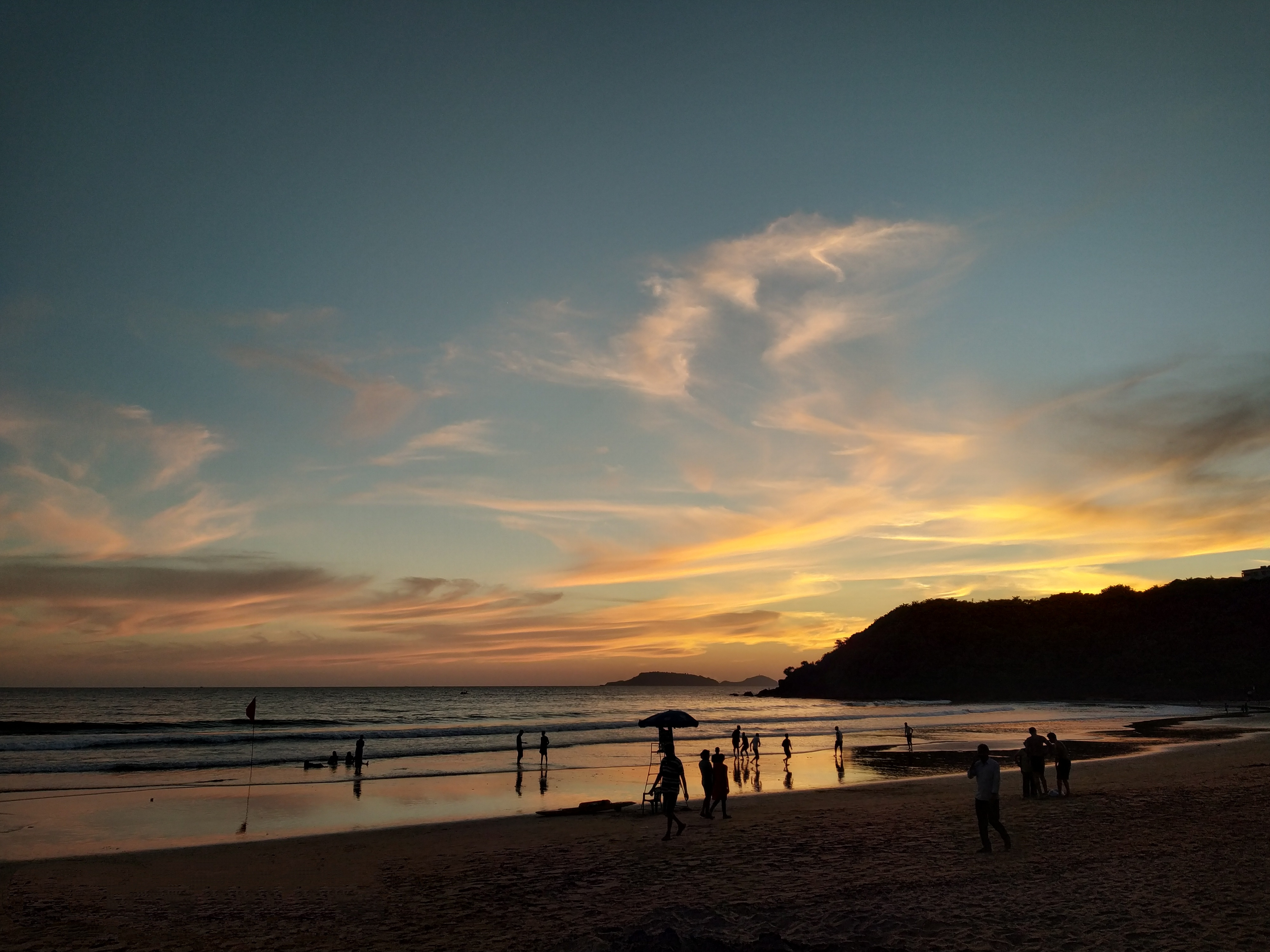
Indian and foreign tourists at beaches in Goa. Ships can be seen in the background in the top image, while hills can be seen in the background in the centre image and Bogmalo beach near Goa airport in the bottom image.

Tourism is generally focused on the coastal areas of Goa, with lower tourist activity inland. In 2010, there were more than 2 million tourists reported to have visited Goa, about 1.2 million of whom were from abroad. As of 2013, Goa was a destination of choice for Indian and foreign tourists, particularly Britons who wanted to vacation outside their countries. The state was hopeful that changes could be made which would attract a more upscale demographic.

Goa stands 6th in the Top 10 Nightlife cities in the world in National Geographic Travel. One of the biggest tourist attractions in Goa is water sports. Beaches like Baga and Calangute offer jet-skiing, parasailing, banana boat rides, water scooter rides, and more. Patnem beach in Palolem stood third in CNN Travel's Top 20 Beaches in Asia.

Over 450 years of Portuguese rule and the influence of the Portuguese culture presents to visitors to Goa a cultural environment that is not found elsewhere in India. Goa is often described as a fusion between Eastern and Western culture with Portuguese culture having a dominant position in the state be it in its architectural, cultural or social settings. The state of Goa is famous for its excellent beaches, churches, and temples.

=== Historic sites and neighbourhoods ===
Goa has one World Heritage Site: the Bom Jesus Basilica with churches and convents of Old Goa. The basilica holds the mortal remains of Saint Francis Xavier, regarded by many Catholics as the patron saint of Goa (the patron of the Archdiocese of Goa is actually Saint Joseph Vaz). These are both Portuguese-era monuments and reflect a strong European character. The relics are taken down for veneration and for public viewing (exposition), per the prerogative of the Church in Goa. The first exposition was held in 1782 nearly 230 years after the death of St. Francis Xavier. The second exposition was held 77 years after the first exposition. After the Indian annexation of Goa, the expositions were held every 10 years between December and January. The last exposition was held in 2024.

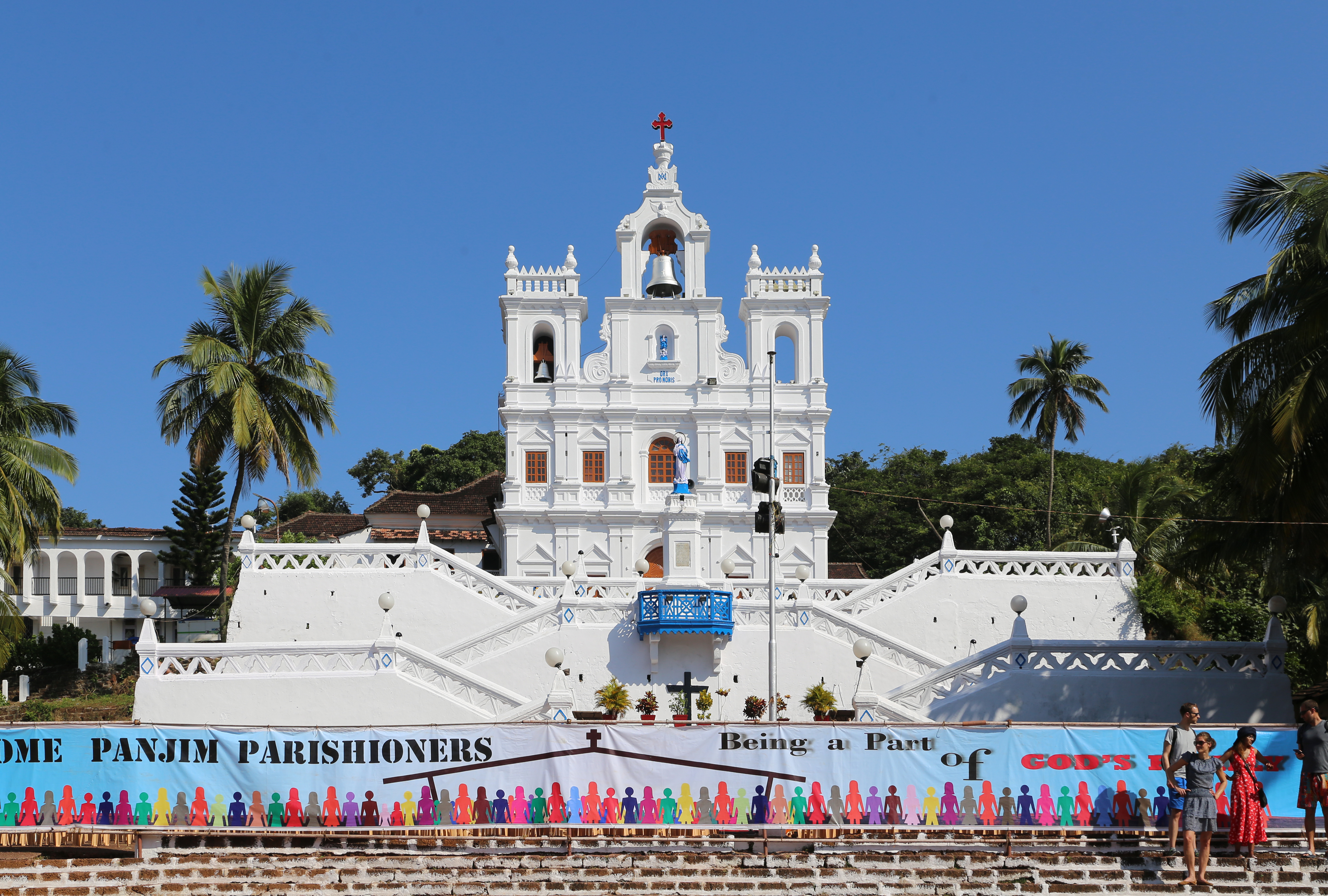
Our Lady of the Immaculate Conception Church in Panaji

Tourist Arrivals
Year	Total Arrivals	% Change
1985	775,212	Steady
1990	881,323	▲13.3
1995	1,107,705	▲23.7
2000	1,268,513	▲13.8
2005	2,302,146	▲66.3
2010	2,644,805	▲13.9
2015	5,297,902	▲76.4

The Velhas Conquistas regions are known for Goa-Portuguese style architecture. There are many forts in Goa such as Tiracol, Chapora, Corjuem, Aguada, Reis Magos, Nanus, Mormugao, Fort Gaspar Dias and Cabo de Rama.

In many parts of Goa, mansions constructed in the Indo-Portuguese style architecture still stand, though, in some villages, most of them are in a dilapidated condition. Fontainhas in Panaji has been declared a cultural quarter, showcasing the life, architecture and culture of Goa. Influences from the Portuguese era are visible in some of Goa's temples, notably the Shanta Durga Temple, the Mangueshi Temple, the Shri Damodar Temple and the Mahalasa Temple. After 1961, many of these were demolished and reconstructed in the indigenous Indian style.

=== Museums and science centre ===
Goa has three important museums: the Goa State Museum, the Naval Aviation Museum and the National Institute of Oceanography. The aviation museum is one of three in India (the others are in Delhi and Bangalore). The Goa Science Centre is in Miramar, Panaji. The National Institute of Oceanography, India (NIO) is in Dona Paula. Museum of Goa is a privately owned contemporary art gallery in Pilerne Industrial Estate, near Calangute.

=== Beaches ===
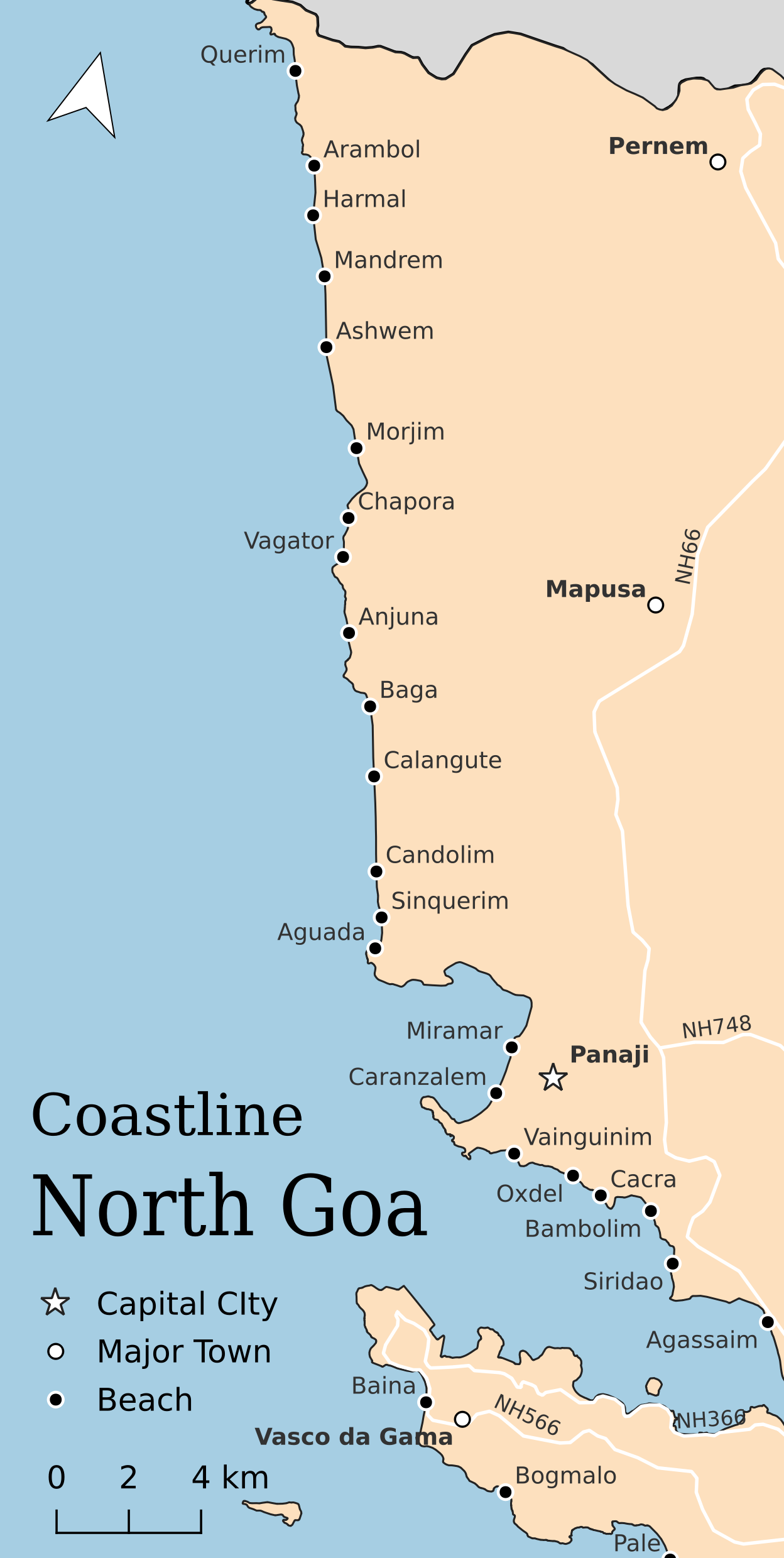
Map of North Goan coastline

Most of the beauty of Goa is present on the beaches. The coastline of about 103 kilometres (64 mi) has some of the most attractive beaches flanked by the Arabian Sea. Some of the beaches include Anjuna Beach, Baga beach, Bambolim Beach, Calangute Beach, Candolim Beach, Colva Beach, and Miramar Beach.Goa has around 54 beaches minimum by a tourist website, however including small minor beaches could take the count to 100+.

== Culture ==
Having been a Portuguese territory for over 450 years, Goan culture is an amalgamation of both Eastern and Western styles, with the latter having a more dominant role. European royal attire of kings is as much part of Goa's cultural heritage as are regional dances performed depicting a unique blend of different religions and cultures of this State. Prominent local festivals are Christmas, Easter, Carnival, Diwali, Shigmo, Chavoth, Samvatsar Padvo, Dasara etc. The Goan Carnival and Christmas-new year celebrations attract many tourists.

The Gomant Vibhushan, the highest civilian honour of the state of Goa, is given annually by the Government of Goa since 2010.

=== Dance and music ===
Being a former territory of Portugal, Goa has a dominant western musical scene with the use of instrument such as the violin, drums, guitar, trumpet and piano. It has also produced a number of prominent musicians and singers for the world of Indian music. Portuguese Fado also has significance in Goa.

Traditional Goan art forms are Corridinho, Mando, Dekhnni, Fugdi, Dulpod and Fado.

Many famous Indian classical singers hail from Goa, including Mogubai Kurdikar, Lata Mangeshkar, Deenanath Mangeshkar, Kishori Amonkar, Kesarbai Kerkar, Jitendra Abhisheki and Pandit Prabhakar Karekar.

Other famous Goan singers and musicians are Lorna Cordeiro (Nightingale of Goa), Chris Perry and Alfred Rose (Melody King of Goa).

=== Theatre ===
Natak, Tiatr (most popular) and Zagor are the chief forms of Goa's traditional performance arts. Other forms are Ranmale, Dashavatari, Kalo, Goulankala, Lalit, Kala and Rathkala. Stories from the Ramayana and the Mahabharata along with more modern social subjects are narrated with song and dance.

Jagor, the traditional folk dance–drama, is performed by the Hindu Kunbi and Christian Gauda communities of Goa, to seek the Divine Grace for protection and prosperity of the crop. The literal meaning of Jagor is "jagran", or wakeful nights. The strong belief is that the night-long performance awakens the deities once a year and they continue to remain awake throughout the year guarding the village.

Perni Jagor is the ancient mask dance–drama of Goa, performed by Perni families, using well crafted and painted wooden masks, depicting various animals, birds, supernatural power, deities, demons, and social characters.

Gauda Jagor is an impression of social life that displays all the existing moods and modes of human characters. It is predominantly based on three main characters, Gharasher, Nikhandar, and Parpati, wearing shining dresses and headgear. The performance is accompanied by vibrant tunes of Goan folk instruments like Nagara/Dobe, Ghumat, Mhadalem, and Kansallem.

In some places, Jagor performances are held with the participation of both Hindus and the Christian community, whereby characters are played by Hindus and musical support is provided by Christian artistes.

Tiatr (Teatro) and its artists play a major role in keeping the Konkani language and music alive. Tiatrs are conducted solely in the Roman script of Konkani as it is primarily a Christian community-based act. They are played in scenes with music at regular intervals, the scenes are portrayals of daily life and are known to depict social and cultural scenarios. Tiatrs are regularly held especially on weekends mainly at Kala Academy, Panaji, Pai Tiatrist Hall at Ravindra Bhavan, Margao and most recent shows have also started at the new Ravindra Bhavan, Baina, Vasco. Western Musical Instruments such as Drums, Bass, Keyboards, and Trumpets are part of the show and most of them are played acoustically. It is one of Goa's few art forms that is renowned across the world with performances popular among Goans in the Middle-East, Americas and Europe.

=== Konkani cinema ===
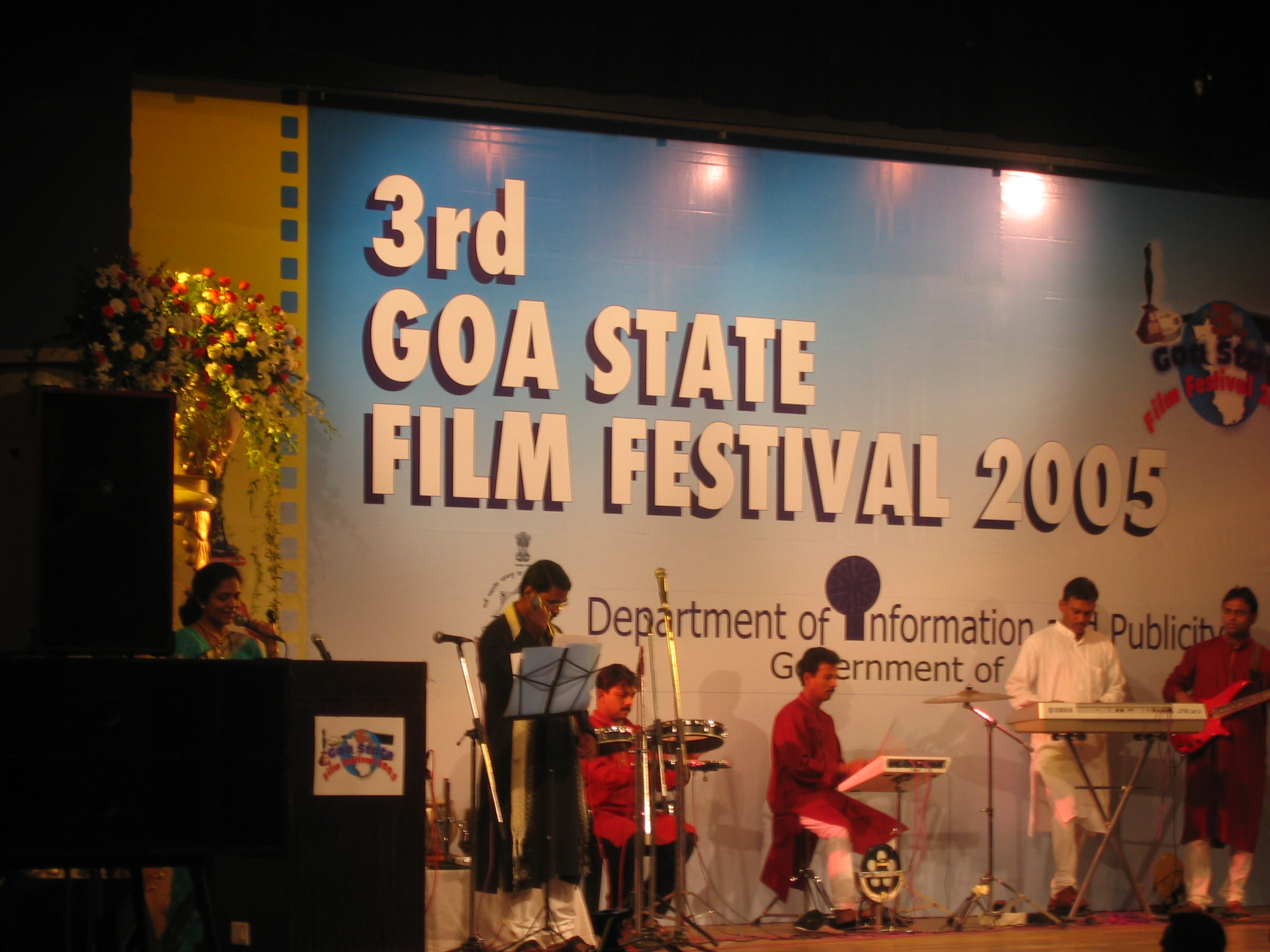
India Goa Film Festival

Konkani cinema is an Indian film industry, where films are made in the Konkani language, which is spoken mainly in the Indian states of Goa, Maharashtra and Karnataka and to a smaller extent in Kerala. Konkani films have been produced in Goa, Karnataka, Maharashtra and Kerala.

The first full-length Konkani film was Mogacho Anvddo, released on 24 April 1950, and was produced and directed by A. L.Jerry Braganza, a native of Mapusa, under the banner of ETICA Pictures. Hence, 24 April is celebrated as Konkani Film Day. Since 2004, starting from the 35th edition, the International Film Festival of India moved its permanent venue to Goa, it is annually held in the months of November and December. Konkani film Paltadcho manis has been included in the world's best films of 2009 list.

Konkani films are eligible for the National Film Award for Best Feature Film in Konkani. The most commercially successful Konkani film, as of June 2011, is O Maria directed by Rajendra Talak. In 2012, the whole new change was adopted in Konkani Cinema by introducing Digital Theatrical Film The Victim directed by Milroy Goes. Some old Konkani films are Sukhachem Sopon, Amchem Noxib, Nirmonn, Mhoji Ghorkarn, Kortubancho Sonvsar, Jivit Amchem Oxem, Mog ani Moipas, Bhuierantlo Munis, Suzanne, Boglantt, Padri and Bhogsonne. Ujwadu is a 2011 Konkani film directed by Kasargod Chinna and produced by KJ Dhananjaya and Anuradha Padiyar.

=== Goan Film Movement ===
The Gen-Z Goan Film Movement, also known as the Goan New Wave, is a youth-driven development in Goan cinema that began in late 2024 and expanded rapidly through 2025. It is characterised by a rise in independently produced short films and documentaries by Goan filmmakers under the age of 25, several of which received international festival recognition.

The movement gained early visibility after the environmental short film The Awakening by filmmaker Rameez Shaikh won the South Asian Regional Award at the Don Bosco Global Youth Film Festival on 18 October 2024. The film was subsequently screened at the WAVES International Short Film Festival in January 2025 and at the Urban Adda Film Festival in June 2025.

A significant boost to documentary filmmaking within the movement came from Prachi Shirodkar and Mario Pimenta, whose film Bhaangar Kalakusar Karigiri won Best Documentary at the Miseentage Indian Film Festival on 22 August 2025, followed by selections at NanoCon in the United States and at Jackson Doc Fest in Tennessee.

During the same period, Pimenta’s environmental short Act To Achieve received its first international screening in the United Kingdom and was later selected for the Egyptian American Film Festival in New York. His experimental horror short RAW was screened at the Willlachen Comedy & Satire Filmprize in Vienna.

The movement expanded as other youth filmmakers attracted international attention. The environmental documentary Naturally Selected, created by Valanka, Shaurya, Aniza and Anaya with support from Fundação Oriente, was included in the line-up of the Footprint Film Festival on 31 October 2025.

By late 2025, Goan Gen-Z filmmakers had collectively achieved more than ten international festival selections across documentary, environmental, social awareness and experimental genres. The movement is credited with expanding the global visibility of Goan and Konkani cinema through low-budget production methods, mobile-phone filmmaking and emerging youth-led creative networks.

=== Food ===
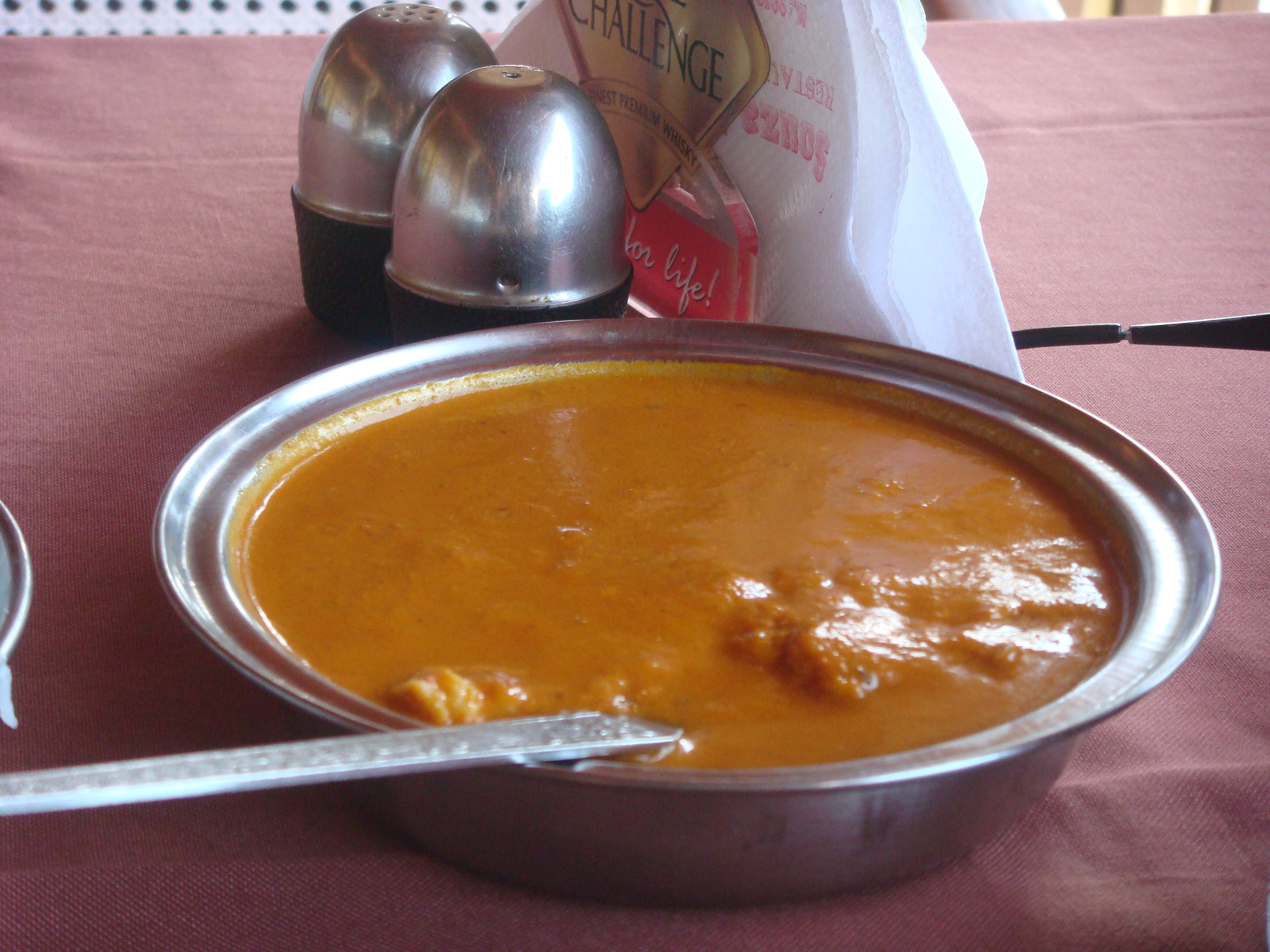
Goan prawn curry, a popular dish throughout the state

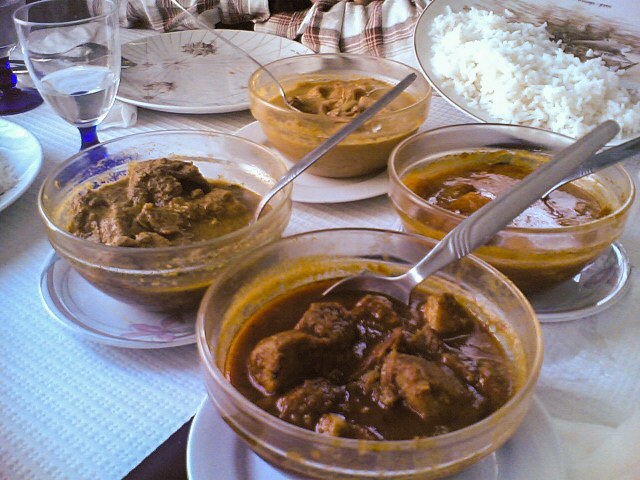
Pork vindaloo is a popular Goan curry dish in the state and around the world.

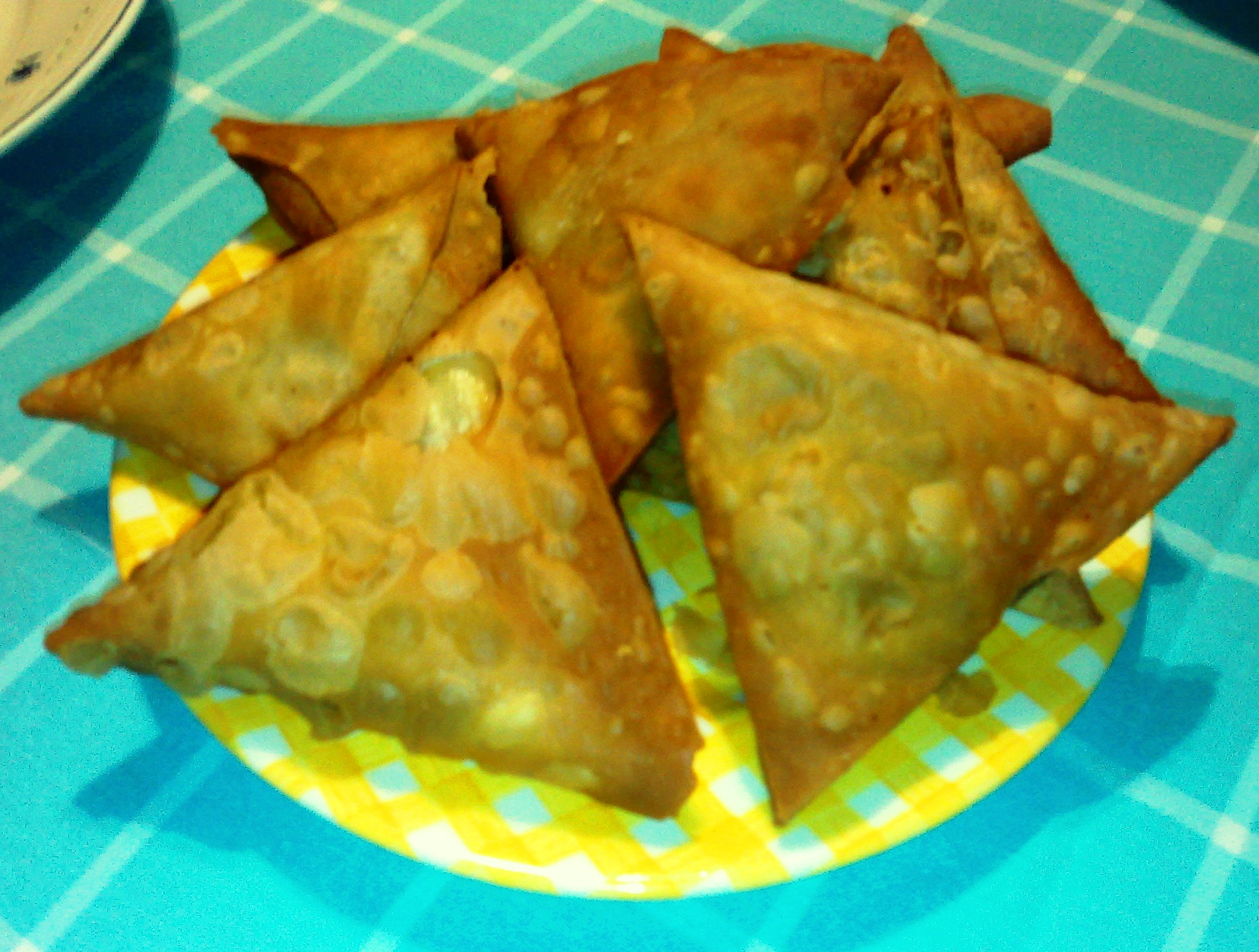
Chamuças, Goan samosas

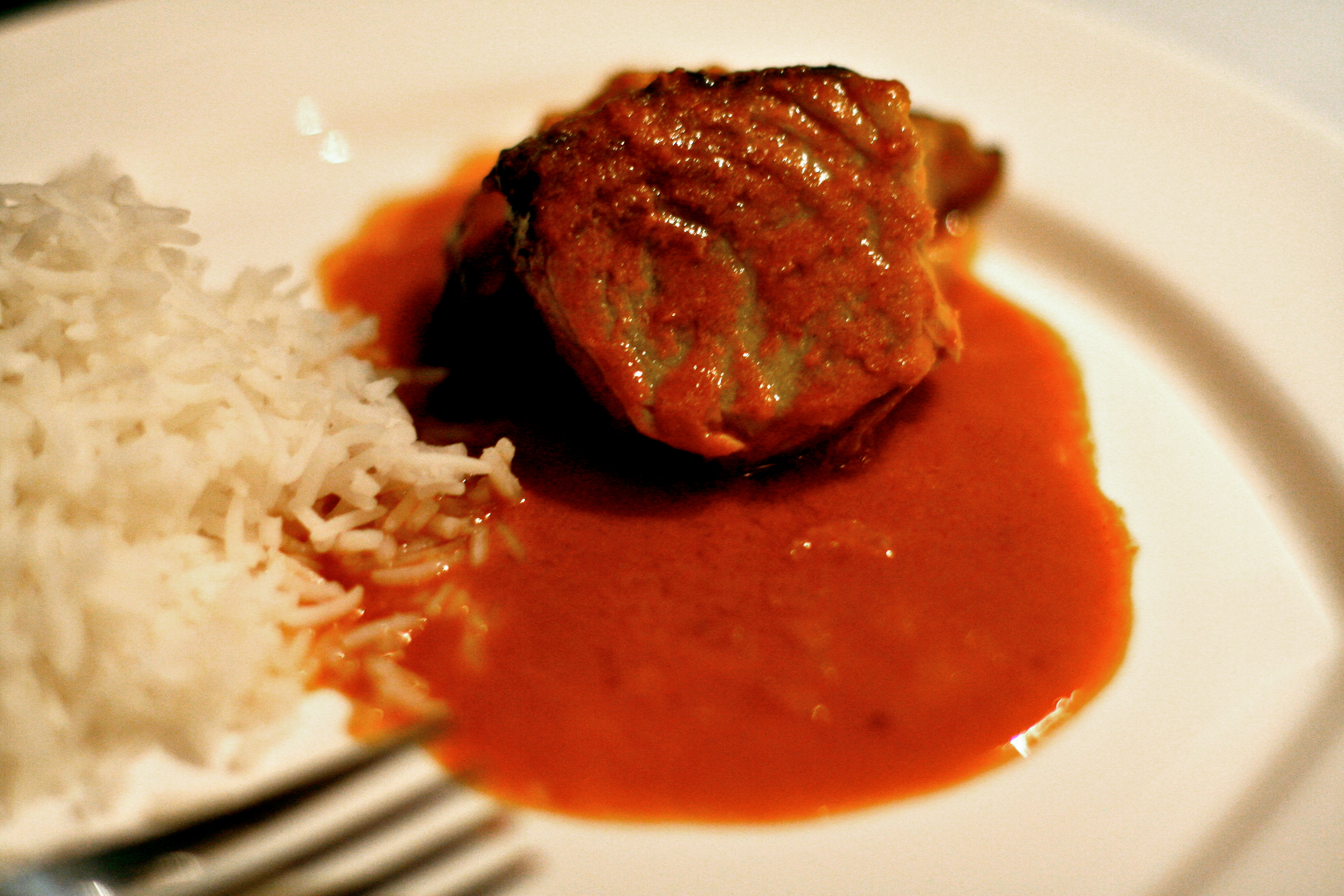
Traditional Goan fish curry

Rice with fish curry (xit koddi in Konkani) is the staple diet in Goa. Goan cuisine is famous for its rich variety of fish dishes cooked with elaborate recipes. Coconut and coconut oil are widely used in Goan cooking along with chili peppers, spices, and vinegar, used in the Catholic cuisine, giving the food a unique flavour. Goan cuisine is heavily influenced by Portuguese cuisine.

Goan food may be divided into Goan Catholic and Goan Hindu cuisine with each showing very distinct tastes, characteristics, and cooking styles. Pork dishes such as vindalho, xacuti, chouriço, and sorpotel are cooked for major occasions among the Goan Catholics. A mixed vegetable stew, known as khatkhate, is a very popular dish during the celebrations of festivals, Hindu and Christian alike. Khatkhate contains at least five vegetables, fresh coconut, and special Goan spices that add to the aroma. Sannas, Hitt, are local rice cakes and Polle, Amboli, and Kailoleo are rice pancakes; all are native to Goa. A rich egg-based, multi-layered baked sweet known as bebinca is traditional at Christmas.

Stone chocolate is a type of handcrafted dark chocolate associated with Goan cuisine. It is made using traditional techniques and often incorporates local ingredients, including spices that reflect the region's culinary heritage. The chocolate is known for its smooth texture and rich flavour, influenced by Goa's tropical climate and unique cultural blend.

The most popular alcoholic beverage in Goa is feni. Cashew feni is made from the double distillation of the fermented fruit juice of the cashew tree, while coconut feni is made from the double distillation of the fermented sap of toddy palms. Urrak is another local liquor prepared from the single distillation of the fermented cashew fruit juice. In fact the bar culture is one of the unique aspects of the Goan villages where a local bar serves as a meeting point for villagers to unwind. Goa also has a rich wine culture due to Portuguese rule.

=== Architecture ===
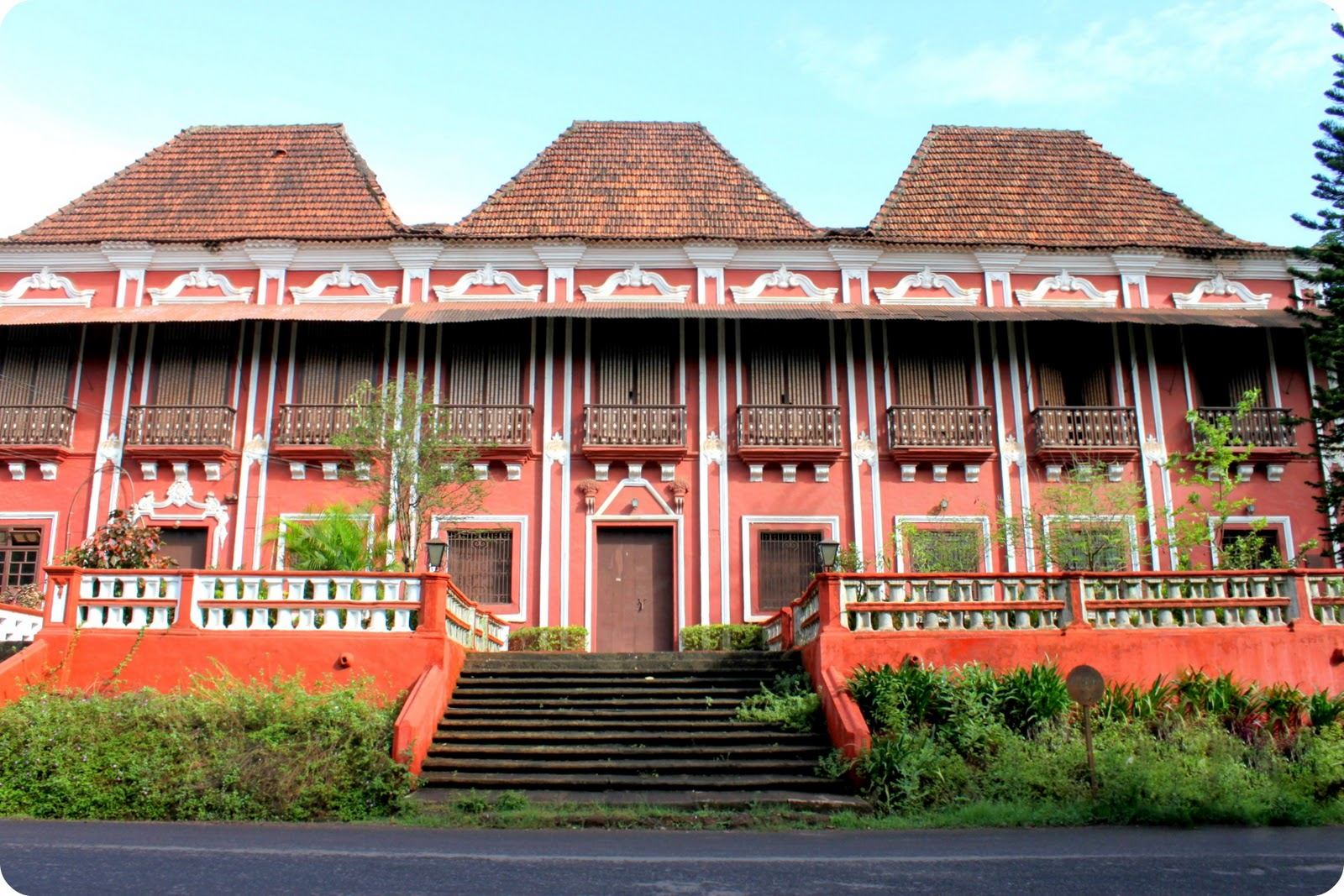
The House of the Seven Gables in Margao

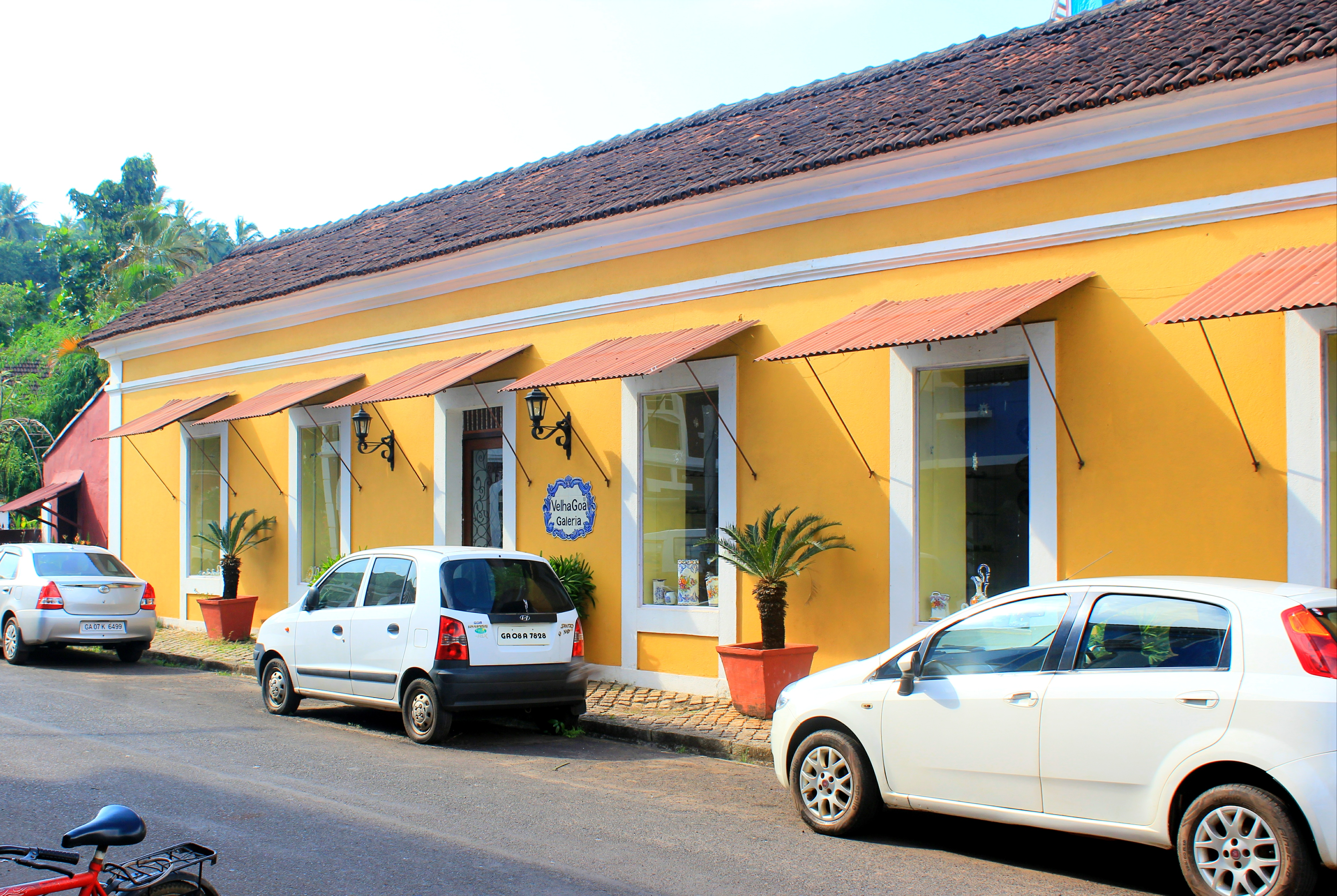
Velha Goa Galeria, in Panaji

The architecture of Goa is a combination of native Goan, Ottoman and Portuguese styles. Since the Portuguese ruled and governed for four centuries, many churches and houses bear a striking element of the Portuguese style of architecture. Goan Hindu houses do not show any Portuguese influence, though the modern temple architecture is an amalgam of original Goan temple style with Dravidian, Hemadpanti, Islamic, and Portuguese architecture. The original Goan temple architecture fell into disuse as the temples were demolished by the Portuguese and the Sthapati known as Thavayi in Konkani were converted to Christianity though the wooden work and the Kavi murals can still be seen.

== Transportation ==
=== Air ===
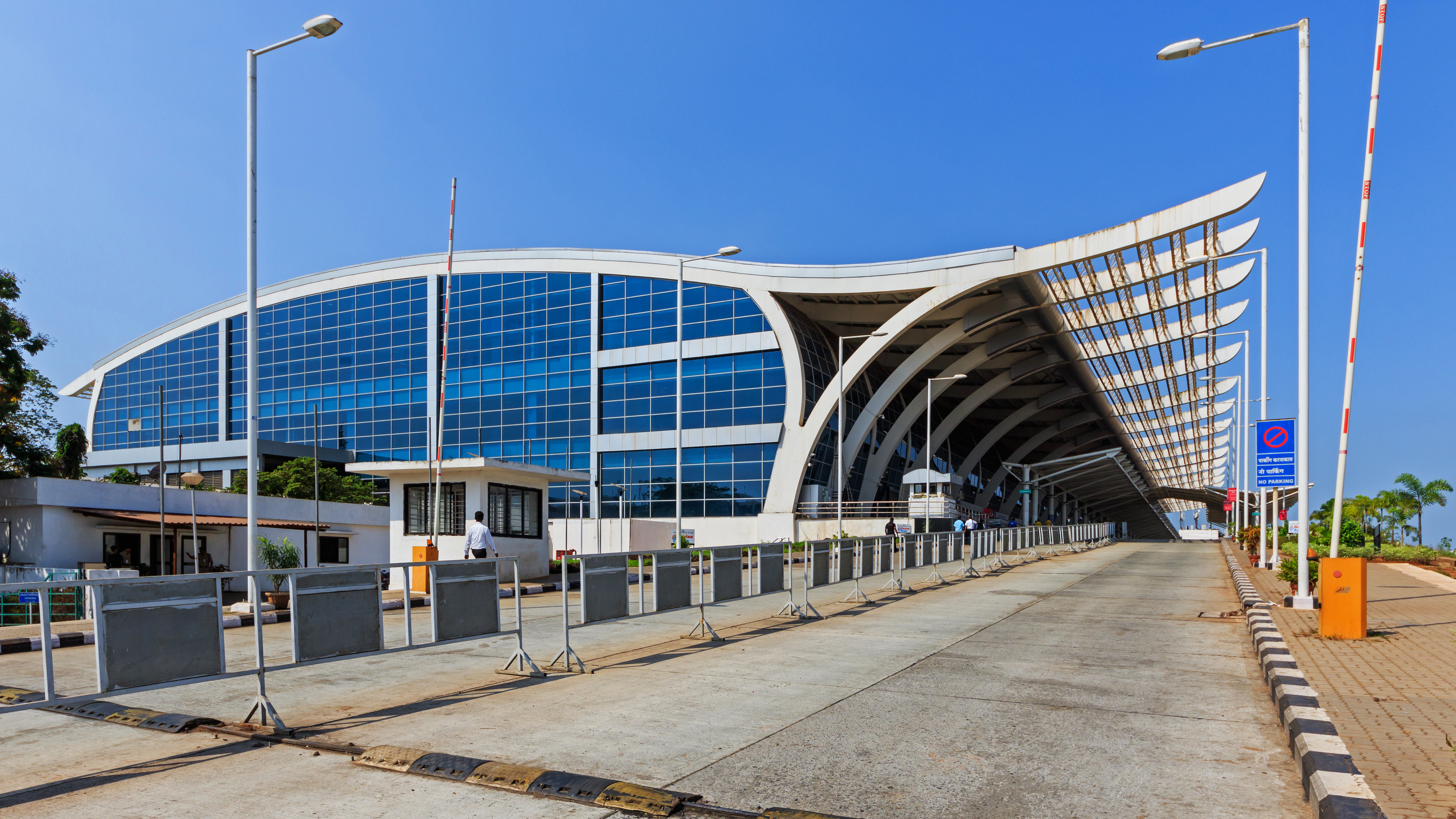
Goa International Airport, Dabolim

Goa is served by two international Airports. Goa International Airport, is a civil enclave at INS Hansa, a Naval airfield located at Dabolim, near Vasco da Gama while the Manohar International Airport is located in the North at Mopa. Within five months of its inception, Mopa airport began handling 30 per cent of all air traffic of Goa. The airports cater to scheduled domestic and international air services, with the new airport having started international operations from March 2023. Goa has scheduled international connections to Doha, Dubai, Muscat, Sharjah and Kuwait in the Middle East by airlines like Air Arabia, Air India, GoAir, IndiGo, Oman Air, SpiceJet and Qatar Airways.

=== Road ===
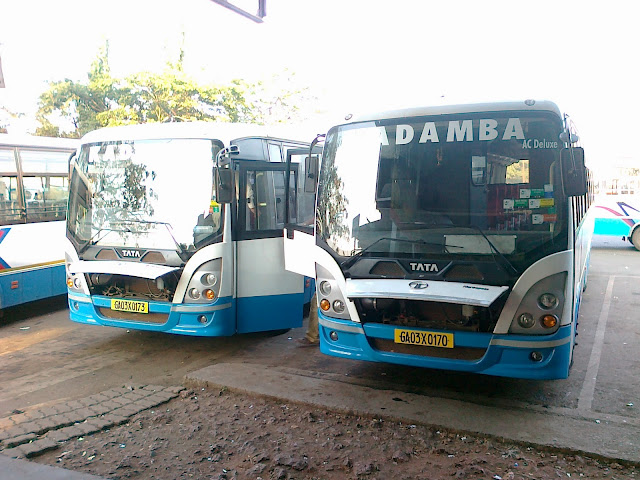
Government-run Kadamba buses at a bus station in Goa

Goa's public transport largely consists of privately operated buses linking the major towns to rural areas. Government-run buses, maintained by the Kadamba Transport Corporation, link major routes (like the Panaji–Margao route) and some remote parts of the state. The Corporation owns 15 bus stands, 4 depots and one Central workshop at Porvorim and a Head Office at Porvorim. In large towns such as Panaji and Margao, intra-city buses operate. However, public transport in Goa is less developed, and residents depend heavily on their own transportation, usually motorised two-wheelers and small family cars.

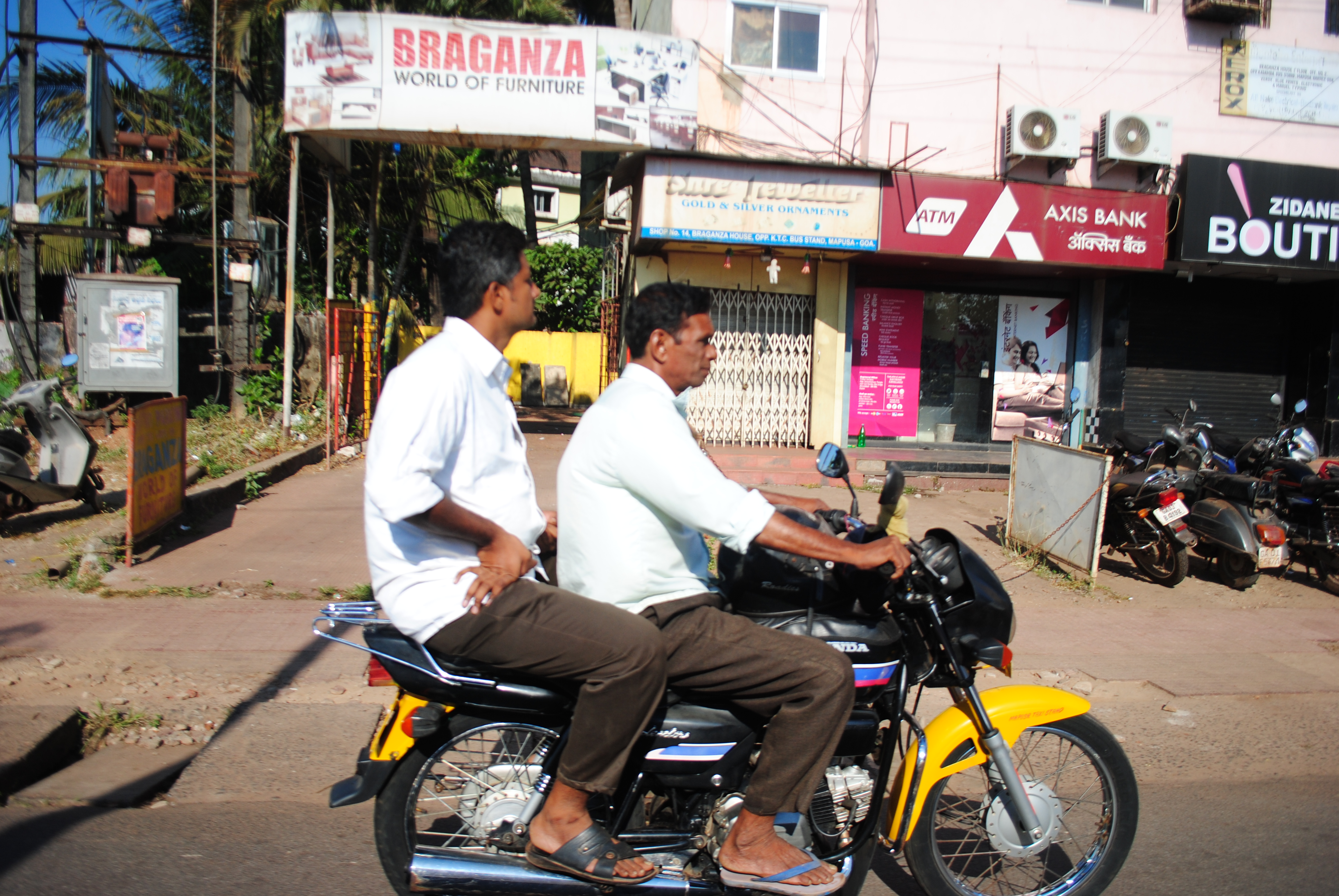
Motorcycle taxi, or pilot

Goa has four National Highways passing through it. NH-66 (ex NH-17) runs along India's west coast and links Goa to Mumbai in the north and Mangalore to the south. NH-4A running across the state connects the capital Panaji to Belgaum in east, linking Goa to cities in the Deccan. The NH-366 (ex NH-17A) connects NH-66 to Mormugao Port from Cortalim. The new NH-566 (ex NH-17B) is a four-lane highway connecting Mormugao Port to NH-66 at Verna via Dabolim Airport, primarily built to ease pressure on the NH-366 for traffic to Dabolim Airport and Vasco da Gama. NH-768 (ex NH-4A) links Panaji and Ponda to Belgaum and NH-4. Goa has a total of 224 km (139 mi) of national highways, 232 km (144 mi) of state highway and 815 kilometres (506 miles) of district highway. National Highways in Goa are among the narrowest in the country and will remain so for the foreseeable future, as the state government has received an exemption that allows narrow national highways. In Kerala, highways are 45 metres (148 feet) wide. In other states National Highways are grade separated highways 60 metres (200 feet) wide with a minimum of four lanes, as well as 6 or 8 lane access-controlled expressways.

Hired forms of transport include unmetered taxis and, in urban areas, auto rickshaws. Another form of transportation in Goa is the motorcycle taxi, operated by drivers who are locally called "pilots". These vehicles transport a single pillion rider, at fares that are usually negotiated. Other than buses, "pilots" tend to be the cheapest mode of transport. River crossings in Goa are serviced by flat-bottomed ferry boats, operated by the river navigation department.

Goa will get two new expressways in the coming years, which will connect the state and will enhance connectivity and commute with the rest of the country. They are as follows:

- Nagpur–Goa Expressway: Proposed, to be completed by 2028/29.
- Konkan Expressway: Proposed.

=== Rail ===
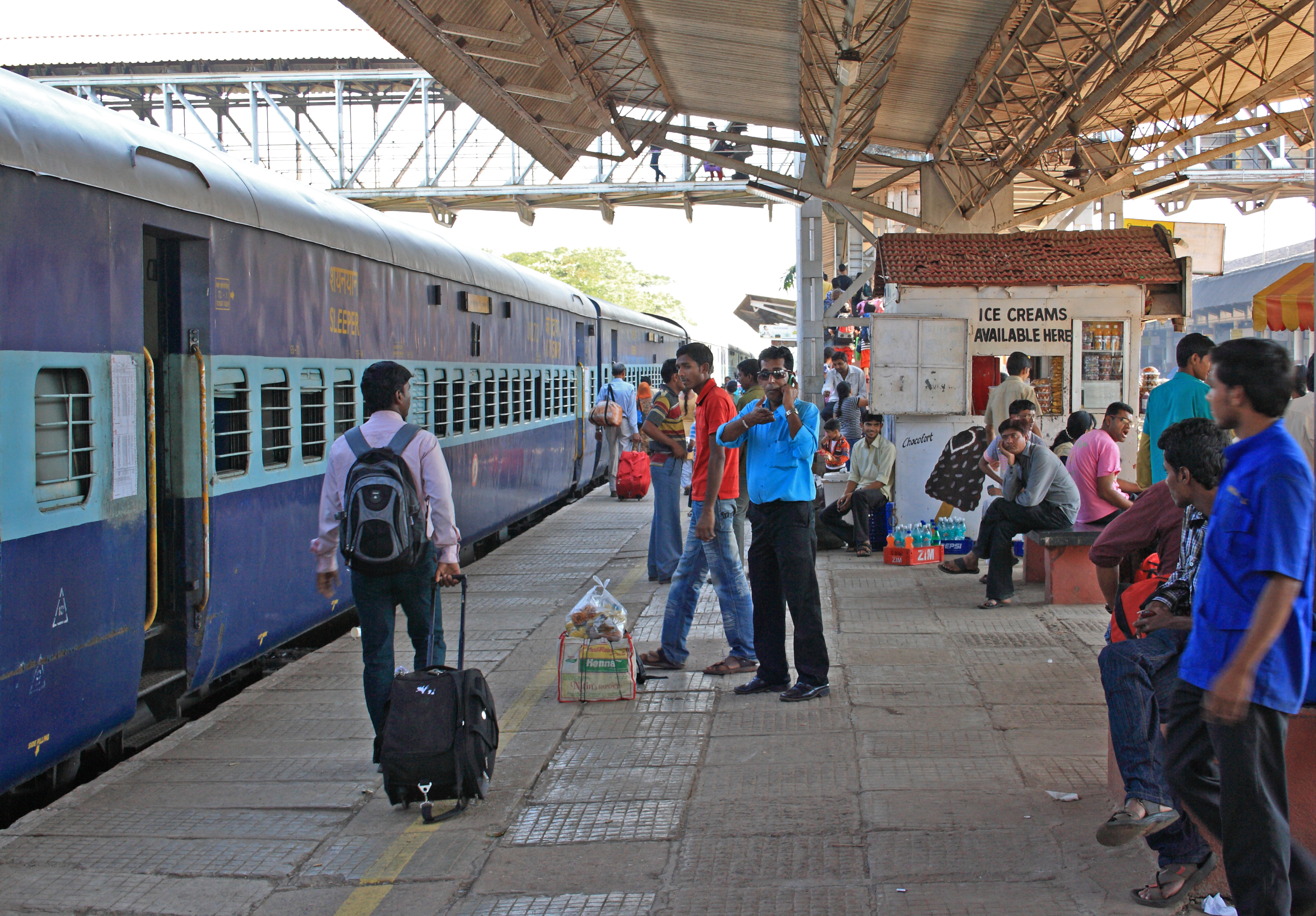
Margao railway station

Goa has two rail lines – one run by the South Western Railway and the other by the Konkan Railway. The line run by the South Western Railway was built during the colonial era linking the port town of Vasco da Gama, Goa with Belgaum, Hubli, Karnataka via Margao. The Konkan Railway line, which was built during the 1990s, runs parallel to the coast connecting major cities on the western coast.

=== Metro ===
In 2018, a metro rail was planned by the NITI Aayog, linking the capital city of Panaji. In the future, it would be extended from South Goa till the coastal city of Karwar in Karnataka, close to the Kanataka-Goa border.

=== Skybus Metro ===
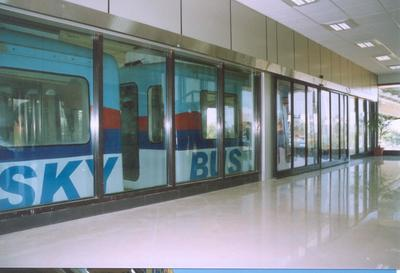
Skybus Metro car at a station

Indian scientist B. Rajaram started the ambitious Skybus Metro project under the Konkan Railway Corporation in partnership with Bharat Earth Movers Limited (BEML). Like the Wuppertal Schwebebahn in Germany, the scheme proposed an elevated, suspended railway layout where vehicles would swing from above lines. The objective was to minimise urban congestion by offering a quick and effective urban transportation alternative.

Despite its promise, the project encountered some obstacles, like as safety issues after a 2004 test run disaster. The idea ultimately faced shelving despite its early promise and creative approach to urban transportation.

Although the Skybus did not succeed, the idea demonstrated India's desire to investigate other forms of transportation, and Indian Railways was granted a patent for the system.

=== Sea ===
The Mormugao Port Trust near the city of Vasco handles mineral ore, petroleum, coal, and international containers. Much of the shipments consist of minerals and ores from Goa's hinterland. Panaji, which is on the banks of the Mandovi, has a minor port, which used to handle passengers steamers between Goa and Mumbai till the late 1980s. There was also a short-lived catamaran service linking Mumbai and Panaji operated by Damania Shipping in the 1990s.

== Education ==
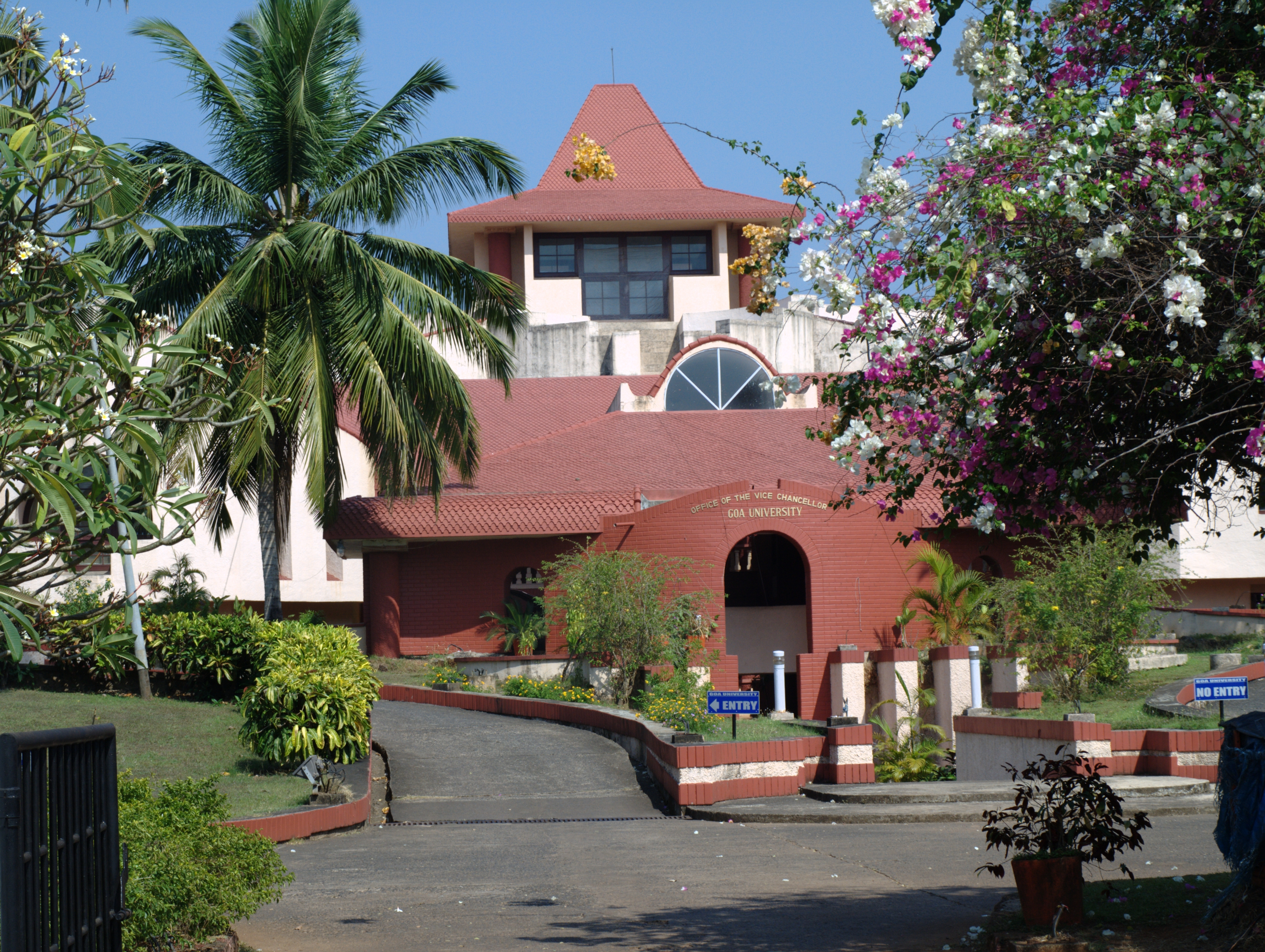
Goa University

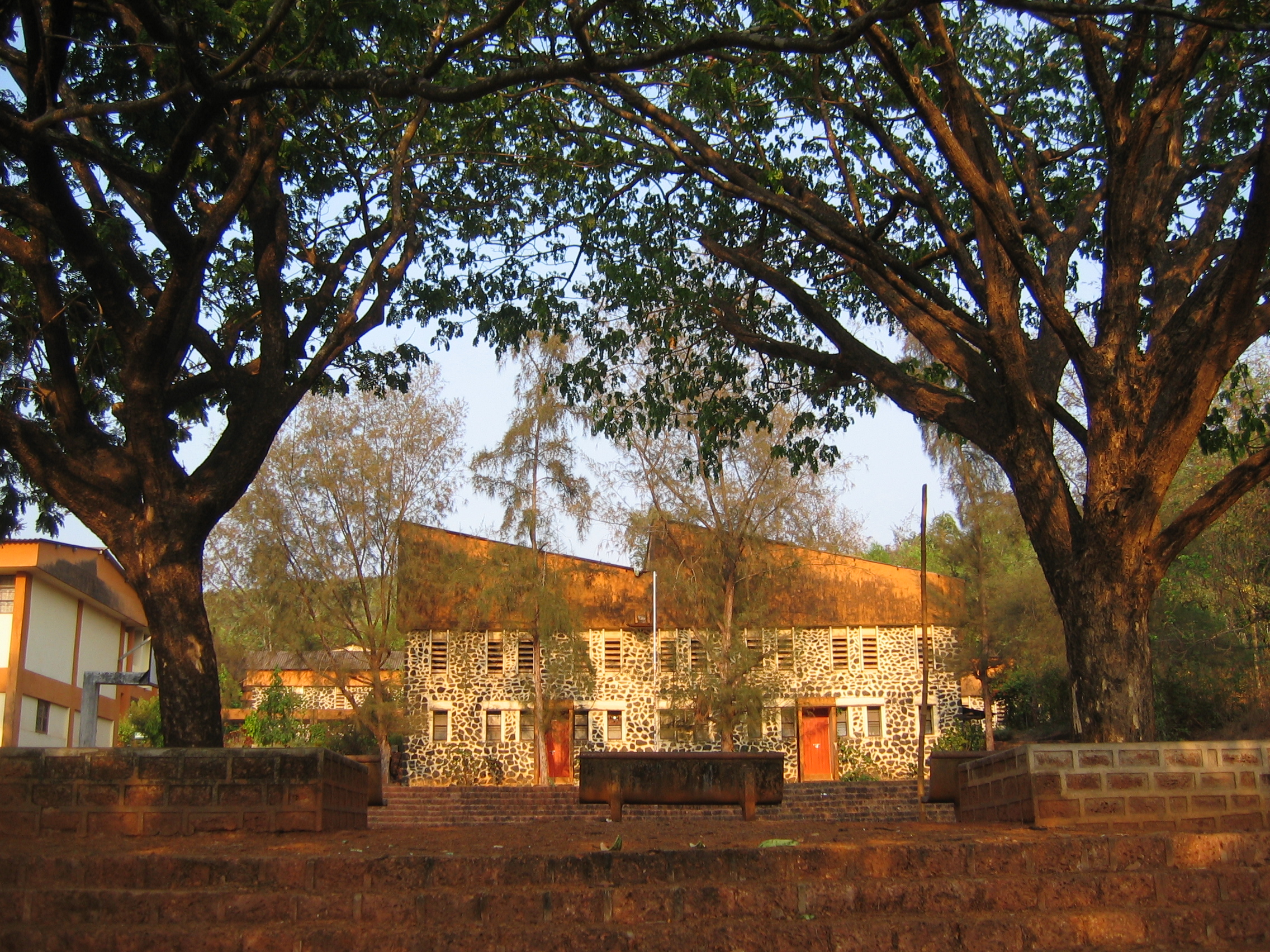
Carmel College for Women, established more than 50 years ago to address the education gender gap, is affiliated to Goa University.

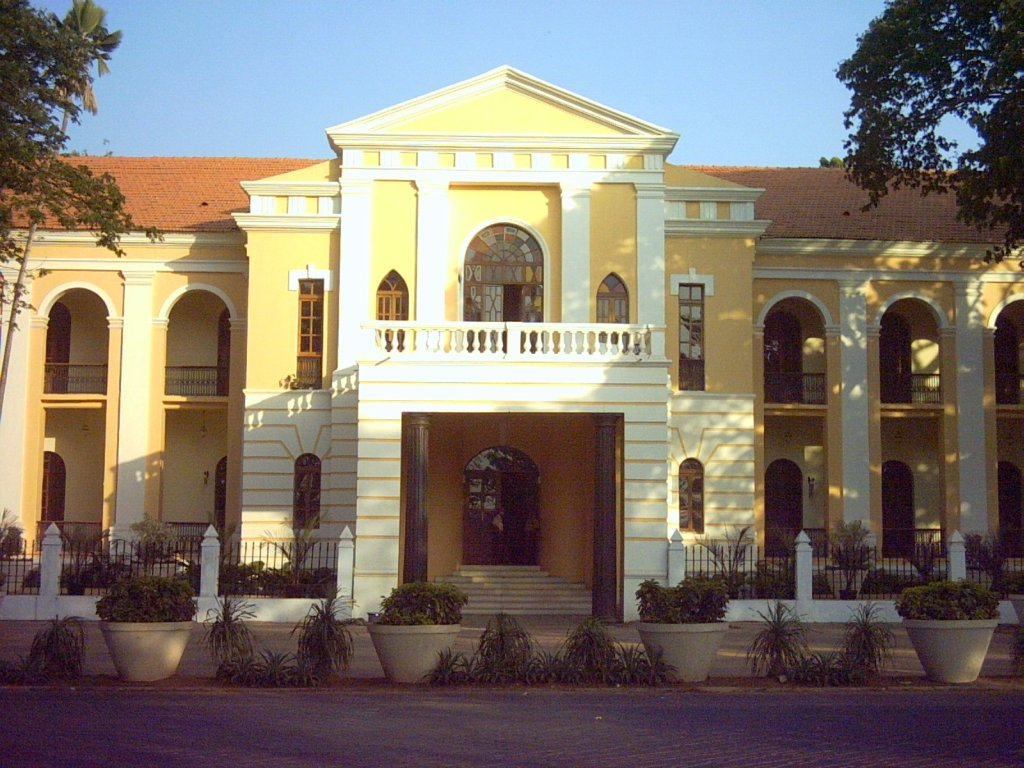
Goa Medical College, previously called Escola Médico–Cirúrgica de Goa

Goa had India's earliest educational institutions built with European support. The Portuguese set up seminaries for religious education and parish schools for elementary education. Founded c. 1542 by Saint Francis Xavier, Saint Paul's College, Goa was a Jesuit school in Old Goa, which later became a college. St Paul's was once the main Jesuit institution in Asia. It housed the first printing press in India and published the first books in 1556.

Medical education began in 1801 with the offering of regular medical courses at the Royal and Military Hospital in the old City of Goa. Built-in 1842 as the Escola Médico-Cirúrgica de (Nova) Goa (Medical-Surgical School of Goa), Goa Medical College is one of Asia's oldest medical colleges and has one of the oldest medical libraries (since 1845). It houses one of the largest hospitals in Goa and continues to provide medical education and training.

According to the 2011 census, Goa has a literacy rate of 87%, with 90% of males and 84% of females being literate. Each taluka is made up of villages, each having a school run by the government. Private schools are preferred over government-run schools. All schools come under the Goa Board of Secondary and Higher Secondary Education, whose syllabus is prescribed by the state education department. There are also a few schools that subscribe to the all-India ICSE syllabus or the NIOS syllabus. Most students in Goa complete their high school with English as the medium of instruction. Most primary schools, however, use Konkani and Marathi (in private, but government-aided schools). As is the case in most of India, enrolment for vernacular media has seen a fall in numbers in favour of English medium education. Per a report published in The Times of India, 84% of Goan primary schools were run without an administrative head.

Some notable schools in Goa include Sharada Mandir School in Miramar, Loyola High School in Margao and The King's School in São José de Areal. After ten years of schooling, students join a Higher Secondary school, which offers courses in popular streams such as Science, Arts, Law, and Commerce. A student may also opt for a course in vocational studies. Additionally, they may join three-year diploma courses. Two years of college is followed by a professional degree programme. Goa University, the sole university in Goa, is located in Taleigão and most Goan colleges are affiliated with it.

There are six engineering colleges in the state. Goa Engineering College and National Institute of Technology Goa are government-funded colleges whereas the private engineering colleges include Don Bosco College of Engineering at Fatorda, Shree Rayeshwar Institute of Engineering and Information Technology at Shiroda, Agnel Institute of Technology, and Design (AITD), Assagao, Bardez and Padre Conceicao College of Engineering at Verna. In 2004, BITS Pilani one of the premier institutes in India, inaugurated its second campus, the BITS Pilani Goa Campus, at Zuarinagar near Dabolim. The Indian Institute of Technology Goa (IIT Goa) began functioning from its temporary campus, located in Goa Engineering College since 2016. The site for permanent campus was finalised in Cotarli, Sanguem.

There are colleges offering pharmacy, architecture and dentistry along with numerous private colleges offering law, arts, commerce and science. There are also two National Oceanographic Science related centres: the National Centre for Antarctic and Ocean Research in Vasco da Gama and the National Institute of Oceanography in Dona Paula. Goa Institute of Management located at Sanquelim, near Panaji is one of India's premier business schools. In addition to the engineering colleges, there are government polytechnic institutions in Panaji, Bicholim and Curchorem, and aided institutions like Father Agnel Polytechnic in Verna and the Institute of Shipbuilding Technology in Vasco da Gama which impart technical and vocational training.

Other colleges in Goa include Shri Damodar College of Commerce and Economics, V.V.M's R.M. Salgaocar Higher Secondary School in Margao, G.V.M's S.N.J.A higher secondary school, Don Bosco College, D.M.'s College of Arts, Science and Commerce, St Xavier's College, Carmel College, The Parvatibai Chowgule College, Dhempe College, Damodar College, M. E. S. College of Arts & Commerce, S. S. Samiti's Higher Secondary School of Science and Rosary College of Commerce & Arts. As the result of renewed interest in the Portuguese language and culture, Portuguese at all levels of instruction is offered in many schools in Goa, largely private ones. In some cases, Goan students do student exchange programs in Portugal.

== Media and communication ==
Historically, the media in Goa grew in the late 1800s before being clamped down on during the rule of António de Oliveira Salazar. The first printing press in Goa was founded in 1556. In 1886, Tipografia Rangel, one of the pioneers in widescale publishing was founded. Prior to this the only existing presses were those of the government and individual family presses existing to print the political newspapers such as O Ultramar. Tipografia Rangel was among the leaders in providing print media to a larger section of society in Goa.

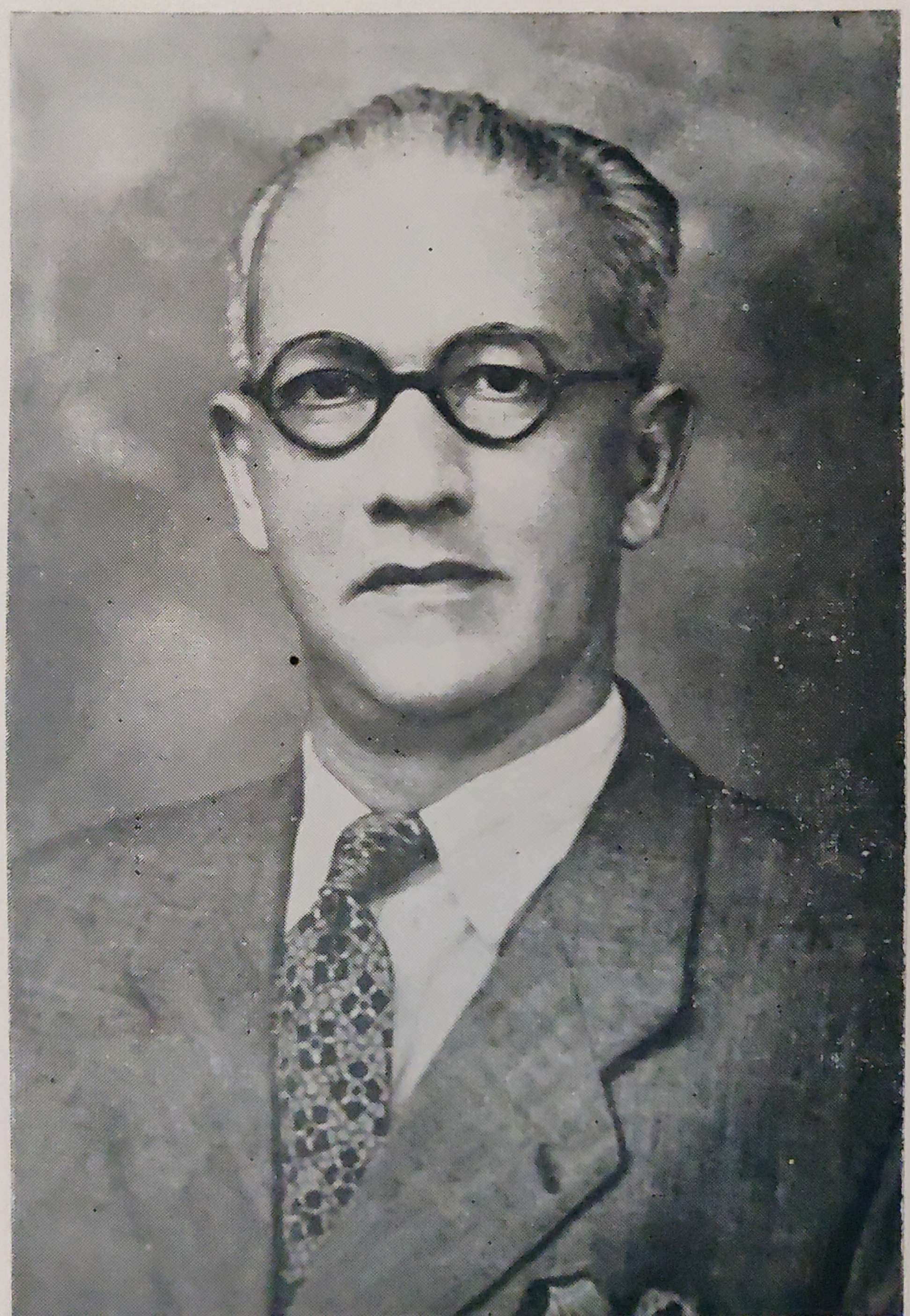
Jaime Valfredo Rangel, Director of Tipografia Rangel

Goa is served by almost all television channels available in India. Channels are received through cable in most parts of Goa. In the interior regions, channels are received via satellite dishes. Doordarshan, the national television broadcaster, has two free terrestrial channels on air. Television broadcasts (DD Goa) began in 1982.

DTH (Direct To Home) TV services are available from Dish TV, Videocon D2H, Tata Sky and DD Direct Plus. The All India Radio is the only radio channel in the state that broadcasts on both FM and AM bands. Two AM channels are broadcast, the primary channel at 1287 kHz and the Vividh Bharati channel at 1539 kHz. AIR's FM channel is called FM Rainbow and is broadcast at 105.4 MHz. A number of private FM radio channels are available, Big FM at 92.7 and Radio Indigo at 91.9 MHz. There is also an educational radio channel, Gyan Vani, run by IGNOU broadcast from Panaji at 107.8 MHz. In 2006, St Xavier's College, Mapusa, became the first college in the state to launch a campus community radio station "Voice of Xavier's".

Major cellular service operators include Bharti Airtel, Vodafone Essar, Idea Cellular (merged with Vodafone in 2018), Telenor, Reliance Infocomm, Tata DoCoMo, BSNL CellOne and Jio.

Local publications include the English language O Heraldo (Goa's oldest, once a Portuguese language paper), The Gomantak Times and The Navhind Times. In addition to these, The Times of India and The Indian Express are also received from Mumbai and Bangalore in the urban areas. The Times of India has recently started publication from Goa itself, serving the local population news directly from the state capital. Among the list of officially accredited newspapers are O Heraldo, The Navhind Times and The Gomantak Times in English; Bhaangar Bhuin in Konkani (Devanagari script); and Tarun Bharat, Gomantak, Navprabha, Goa Times, Sanatan Prabhat, Govadoot and Lokmat (all in Marathi). All are dailies. Other publications in the state include Planet Goa (English, monthly), Goa Today (English, monthly), Goan Observer (English, weekly), Vauraddeancho Ixtt (Roman-script Konkani, weekly) Goa Messenger, Vasco Watch, Gulab (Konkani, monthly), Bimb (Devanagari-script Konkani).

One electronic mailing list that is based in Goa is Goanet.

== Sports ==
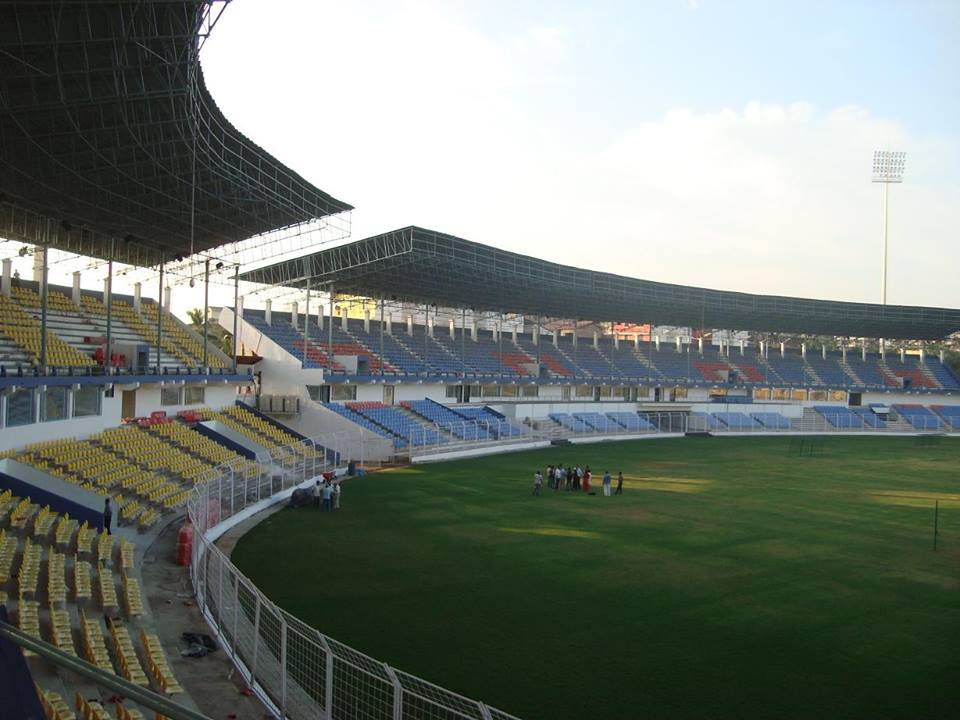
Fatorda Stadium

Association football is the most popular sport in Goa and is embedded in Goan culture as a result of the Portuguese influence. Its origins in the state are traced back to 1883 when the visiting Irish priest Fr. William Robert Lyons established the sport as part of a "Christian education". On 22 December 1959, the Associação de Futebol de Goa was formed, which continues to administer the game in the state under the new name Goa Football Association. Goa, along with West Bengal, Kerala and Northeast India is the locus of football in India and is home to many football clubs in the national I-League. The state's football powerhouses include Salgaocar, Dempo, Churchill Brothers, Vasco, Sporting Clube de Goa and FC Goa. The first Unity World Cup was held in Goa in 2014. The state's main football stadium, Fatorda Stadium, is located at Margao and also hosts cricket matches. The state hosted few matches of the 2017 FIFA U-17 World Cup and several matches of the 2022 FIFA U-17 Women's World Cup in Fatorda Stadium.

A number of Goans have represented India in football and six of them, namely Samir Naik, Climax Lawrence, Brahmanand Sankhwalkar, Bruno Coutinho, Mauricio Afonso and Roberto Fernandes have all captained the national team. Goa has its own state football team and league, the Goa Professional League. The Portuguese footballer Ronaldo and Brazilian Neymar, are revered football players in Goa.

Goa also has its own cricket team. Dilip Sardesai remains the only Goan to date to play international cricket for India. Another Goan cricketer, Suyash Prabhudessai was selected by the Royal Challengers Bangalore for a base price of ₹20 lakh in IPL 2021 and for ₹30 lakh in IPL 2022.

India (Goa) is a member of the Lusofonia Games which are hosted every four years in one of the Portuguese CPLP member countries, with 733 athletes from 11 countries. Most of the countries competing are countries that are members of the CPLP (Community of Portuguese Language Countries), but some are countries with significant Portuguese communities or have a history with Portugal. This event is similar in concept to the Commonwealth Games (for members of the Commonwealth of Nations) and the Jeux de la Francophonie (for the Francophone community).

== Organised crime ==
Several local Indian, Russian, Israeli, Brazilian, and Nigerian criminal groups are reported to be heavily involved in the organised drug trade in Goa, one of the smallest states of India. Sources reveal that there are also individual players who are British, Brazilian, French, Italian, Portuguese, and of other European nationalities. Some have been visiting the state for over two decades and have their fixed international and local clientele. Organized criminal syndicates in Brazil, such as the Primeiro Comando da Capital (PCC) and Comando Vermelho, source their cocaine from Bolivia and Peru, trafficking it into India primarily via air routes using individual passengers and professional mules who conceal the drug internally or in light luggage. Goa has, in recent days, become a principal hub of the international drug trade apart from being a key point of consumption. According to estimates, drugs flowing out of different foreign locations lands on the comparatively unguarded Goan coastline as Mumbai and its hinterland are no longer considered an easy route for trafficking since checks by the Coastguard, Navy, Customs, and other government bodies began.

== See also ==
- Konkan
- LGBT rights in Goa
- Portuguese Goa and Damaon
