= Satyagraha movement in Goa =

Resistance movement in Goa

- Part of Decolonisation of Asia
- Photographs taken during the Satyagraha movement
Date	1946 – August 15, 1955
Location	Goa, India

Belligerents
Portugal; (Estado Novo (Portugal)) State of India	India; (India) Satyagraha

Commanders and leaders
(Estado Novo (Portugal)) António de Oliveira Salazar (Estado Novo (Portugal)) Paulo Bénard Guedes (governor)	(India) Jawaharlal Nehru (India) Tridib Chaudhuri (India) S. M. Nandekar (India) Sahodrabai Rai (WIA) (India) Kamal Singh †

The Satyagraha movement in Goa was a resistance movement against Portuguese rule in Goa, from 1946 to 1955.

== Background ==
After India gained independence in August 1947, the movement for the liberation of the French and Portuguese pockets on the subcontinent grew. The Portuguese however ignored the demands for independence from both Indians and Goans, continuing to hold onto their colonies despite the growing decolonization movements. In February 1950, the Government of India suggested holding a referendum under United Nations supervision to decide the future of these Portuguese territories, but Portugal rejected the idea of transferring sovereignty. This created a tense struggle between Lisbon and New Delhi.

The Satyagraha movement in Goa, which began in 1946, continued intermittently until India became independent. The hopes for a peaceful settlement were vanished when Goan nationalists came to know of the Portuguese reply to India's first aide memoire.

In 1953, the desire for liberation grew, and a number of small, scattered nationalist organizations came together, forming the Goa action committee. The committee became the coordinating body for the various nationalist groups and began to prepare for a larger campaign aimed at achieving freedom.

Following the success of the annexation of Dadra and Nagar Haveli in August 1954, the Gandhian Goan freedom fighters in Bombay announced the satyagraha movement from 15 August 1954.

== Movement struggle ==
=== August 15, 1954 ===
With support from the Praja Socialist Party, arrangements were all made when Prime Minister Nehru declared that Indians would not be permitted to join the march, fearing that Pakistani satyagrahis would then march to Jammu and Kashmir (state).

Peter Alvares, a prominent member of the Praja Socialist Party assembled three groups of about 15 Goan satyagrahis each. The leader of each group carried the Indian tricolour.

The first group was led by Alfred Alfonso and marched from Siroda to Tiracol Fort. The Portuguese garrison-in-charge, José António Álvares, from Chinchinim, ordered his men to abandon the fort and was later imprisoned for three and a half years.

Mark Fernandes led another group from Banda, Maharashtra to Patradevi.

The third group was led by Anthony D'Souza from Majali-Karwar to the Polem border post.

While all satyagrahis were arrested, only 46 were imprisoned for one to eight years. Anthony D'Souza, however, was sentenced to 28 years of imprisonment.

=== Tiracol incident ===
A group of 15 unarmed volunteers occupied the Tiracol fort, but the Portuguese military reoccupied it the next day, opening fire, killing one volunteer, wounding 12, and arresting several others.

=== May 18, 1955 ===
On May 18, 1955, a group of 54 non–Goan satyagrahis attempted to enter Goa. They were fired upon by Portuguese police, and four were wounded. Following this, many were detained and later sent back to India.

=== July 9, 1955 ===
On July 9, 1955, a party of 52 volunteers, led by Mr. Tridib Chaudhuri, entered Goa. Although most were sent back, Mr. Chowdhury remained behind, becoming the second Indian Member of Parliament to take part in the struggle.

=== July 16, 1955 ===
On July 16, 1955, a group of 59 volunteers, led by Communist leader Mr. S. M. Nandekar, entered Goa from Banda. They were arrested and severely beaten by the Portuguese police.

=== July 25, 1955 ===
On July 25, 1955, railway traffic between India and Goa was suspended due to Portuguese interference. The Portuguese had mined sections of the railway track between Castle Rock and Goa, making it unsafe for trains. This led to the termination of trains at Castle Rock, a border station, until the situation was resolved.

=== July 28, 1955 ===
On July 28, 1955, Bombay's dock workers, under the Transport and Dock Workers Union, decided to boycott all foreign ships carrying cargo to and from Goa. This action targeted eight foreign vessels, mostly British owned, that regularly passed through Bombay, with the aim of disrupting the Portuguese trade and supporting the liberation movement.

=== August 9–12, 1955 ===
On August 9, 1955, a group of 52 Indian volunteers crossed into Goa from Majali. The Portuguese imposed dusk-to-dawn curfews in Diu and Daman after demonstrations and protests. The police responded harshly with charges and other forms of suppression. Meanwhile, heavy military preparations were made by the Portuguese, including the mounting of heavy guns along the border and orders to shoot anyone crossing.

Portuguese Foreign Minister Señor Cunha urged the Indian government to ban the planned mass march of 3,000 satyagrahis on August 15. Despite this, the Indians denied, and the Portuguese closed their legation in New Delhi, shifting their interests to the Brazilian Embassy.

=== Massacre of August 15, 1955 ===
On August 15, 1955, the eighth anniversary of India's Independence, 3,000–5,000 satyagrahis, including women, entered Goa, Daman, and Diu through jungles and swamps in support of the liberation movement. These satyagrahis represented various political parties and came from different walks of life. Within moments of crossing into the Portuguese territories, they faced resistance from the Portuguese. The Portuguese police and military charged the volunteers and opened fire on them in multiple locations. According to Indian officials, the casualties were 22 shot dead and 225 injured.

Prime Minister Jawaharlal Nehru later stated in Parliament that 1,711 volunteers had attempted to cross into Goa, with 1,691 being turned back. Around 1,249 satyagrahis entered Daman, but only five made it through, one of whom was later confirmed dead. The fate of 81 passive resisters who crossed into Diu remained unknown, though no police firing was reported there.

At various border points, groups of satyagrahis entered Portuguese territory under heavy rain. The first group, crossing the southern border at Majali, was met with gunfire after moving just 20 yards into Goa. Mrs. Sahodrabai Rai, holding the national flag, was shot at close range and fell. She was followed by Mr. Kamal Singh of Punjab, who tried to help her but was also shot dead. Another volunteer, Madhukar Chaudhury, fell while attempting to carry the flag forward.

At Palva, near Aronda, satyagrahis hoisted the Indian flag at a temple. When they refused to take it down, the police opened fire, killing one and injuring two others. Volunteers also crossed the Terekhol River and raised the flag over the Tirakul Fort. Gunshots rang out, followed by gunfire, killing Hirane Gurus, secretary of the All India Primary Teachers' Federation, and injuring others.

At Castle Rock, two groups of satyagrahis entered Portuguese territory. The first was met with a lathi charge, injuring 17 volunteers, while the second group was met with gunfire, killing six. At Sasoli, 101 satyagrahis crossed the border, with three wounded and later dying from the police shooting.

In Daman, the Portuguese police, including the governor, severely beat over 1,200 satyagrahis. One elderly sadhu was killed when he refused to retreat, while three others were seriously injured. Meanwhile, several Goans showed hoisted the Indian flag in Mormugao and Bicholim, resulting in their arrest and severe beatings.

== Aftermath ==
After the violent action taken by the Portuguese, relations between India and Portugal were cut, on August 19, 1955. This made nationalists in Goa more violent in their action.

The period between 1955 and the Liberation of Goa saw many atrocities, including killings and suppression of nationalists carried out by the Salazar regime.

After failed diplomatic efforts with Salazar, India launched Operation Vijay, the military campaign that led to the liberation of Goa and the end of 450 years of Portuguese rule.

== Bibliography ==
- Rao, R. P. (1963). Portuguese Rule In Goa 1510-1961. Asia Publishing House.
- Mendes, Sushila (2006). "Jawaharlal Nehru and the Liberation Struggle of Goa". Proceedings of the Indian History Congress. 67: 549–555. JSTOR 44147974.
- Sakshena, R. N. (June 2003). Goa Into the Mainstream. Abhinav Publications. ISBN 978-81-7017-005-1.
- Menezes, João A. (June 27, 2020). The Portuguese Presence in India Latter Day Thorns amidst Tranquilities. Notion Press. ISBN 9781648506291. "Two satyagrahas or unarmed marches into Goa, the first on August 15, 1954 of around 100 Goans and the second on August 15, 1955 of around 3,000 to 5,000 Indians, of which around 30 were shot dead and many injured as a result of defensive firing by the Portuguese Police along the frontier, particularly when they menacingly entered Tiracol Fort."
- Faleiro, Valmiki (2023-07-24). Goa, 1961: The Complete Story of Nationalism and Integration. Penguin Random House India Private Limited. ISBN 978-93-5708-175-7.
