= Pernem taluka =

Pernem Konkani: Pedne Portuguese: Perném
- Taluka
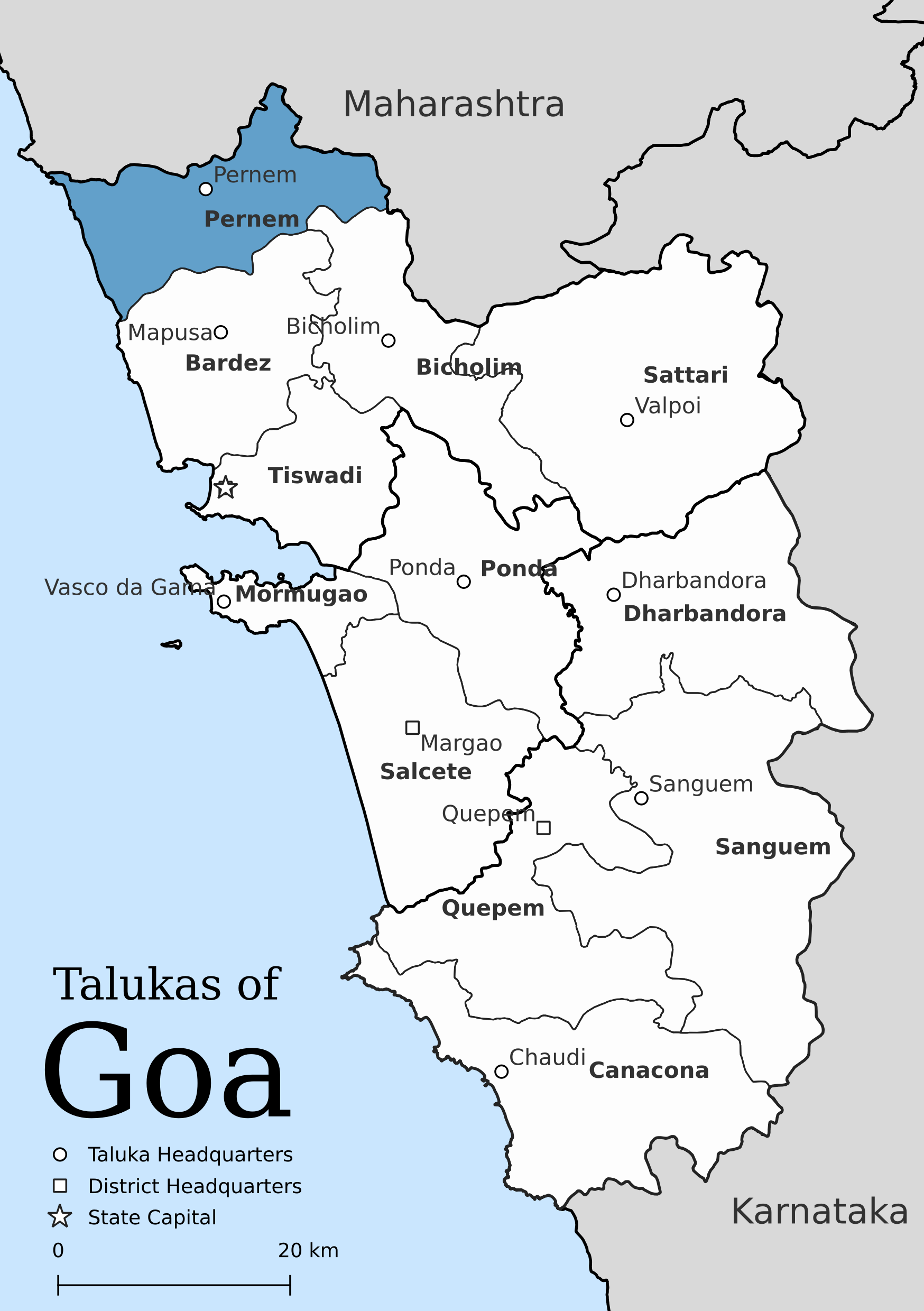
- Location of Pernem in North Goa district in Goa
- Coordinates: 15.716740°N 73.796996°E
- Country: India
- State: Goa
- District: North Goa
- Headquarters: Pernem city
- Settlements: 1 City; 4 Towns; 23 Villages

Government
  - Tehsildar: Ravishekhar Nipanikar
  - Lok Sabha constituency: North Goa
  - Assembly constituency: na
  - MLA: na

Population (2011)
  - Taluka: 75,747
  - Urban: 39.69%

Demographics
  - Literacy rate: na
  - Sex ratio: 960
- PIN: 4035XX
- Vehicle registration: GA-11
- Rain: na

Pernem is the northernmost administrative region in North Goa in India. It acts as the gateway of Goa from the Maharashtra side. It is also the name of the town of Pernem, which is its capital. It has a Municipal Council. Geographically, Pernem is surrounded by Sawantwadi sub-district (Maharashtra State) on East, the Arabian Sea on West, the Bardez and Bicholim sub-districts to the south south and Sawantwadi sub-district (Maharashtra State) to the north north. The two rivers which decide the boundary of the sub-district are Terekhol River and Chapora River. The Terekhol River acts as a border of Maharashtra and Goa while the Chapora River acts as a border between Pernem and Bardez sub-district.

== History ==
Pernem is counted as belonging to one of the two Goan sub-regions, the Novas Conquistas, or New Conquests. It was taken over, lost, and finally regained from the Rajas of Sawantwadi. The Rajas were handling the affairs of Pernem taluka through the Deshprabhu family, which, to this day, owns major lands in Pernem taluka. Sawantwadi was a state on Goa's northern border that allied sometimes with the Portuguese and sometimes with the Marathas. (The Kingdom of Sawantwadi was integrated into the district of Ratnagiri after 1947 and is now part of the district of Sindhudurg.) After the capture of Goa by the Indian Armed Forces from the Portuguese, it became part of the Union Territory of Goa.

Pernem is the Portuguese spelling (the m only makes the e nasal). The name in Konkani is Pedne, and inhabitants are called Pednekar in Konkani. The surname Pednekar, used by some native Brahmin, may indicate their origins in Pernem.

== Location ==
The Konkan Railway passes through Pernem, and there is a railway station called Pernem at a distance of about 4 km east from the town. The proposed Manohar International Airport is situated at Mopa in Pernem sub-district. National Highway 17 (NH-17), which connects Mumbai (Bombay) and Goa, passes through Pernem (bypassed at Malpem)

== Demographics ==
At the time of the 2011 Census of India, Pernem had a population of 75,747 with sex ratio of 960 females to 1000 males. Pernem taluka has an average literacy rate of 80.02%, higher than the national average of 74.04%: male literacy is 84.22% and female literacy is 75.65%. Scheduled Castes and Scheduled Tribes make up 4.05% and 0.06% of the population respectively. 39.69% of the population lives in urban areas.

=== Languages ===
Konkani and Marathi are among the most spoken languages in Pernem taluka. Since the taluka borders Maharashtra, it has a significant Marathi-speaking population.

Languages of Pernem taluka (2011)
1. Konkani (54.5%)
2. Marathi (40.7%)
3. Kannada (1.44%)
4. Hindi (1.07%)
5. Others (2.35%)

At the time of 2011 Census of India, 54.45% of the population of Pernem talukaaluka spoke Konkani, 40.69% Marathi, 1.44% Kannada and 1.07% Hindi as their first language.

=== Religion ===
Religion in Pernem taluka (2011)
Religion	Percent
Hinduism	88.89%
Christianity	10.21%
Islam	0.71%
Others	0.19%

Hinduism is followed by the majority of population of Pernem taluka. Christians form significant minority. At the time of the 2011 Census of India 88.89% of the population of the taluka followed Hinduism, 10.21% Christianity, 0.71% Islam and 0.19% of the population followed other religions or did not state religion.

== Transport ==
Pernem sub-district is well connected through road and Konkan Railway. Pernem railway station is the first railway station in Goa while coming from Mumbai. Mandovi Express, Konkan Kanya Express, Goa Sampark Kranti Express and Margao–Sawantwadi Road passenger (Train No.50107/50108 halts here). NH-17 passes through this area which connects it to Mumbai and Mangalore.

== Culture and religion ==
=== Igreja de São José ===
A Chapel in Pernem was built in 1852 by the Portuguese after their successful Novo Conquistas campaign. It was elevated into a Parish on January 2, 1855. St. Joseph Church, Pernem was rebuilt in 1864. The Parish was renovated in 2002. The Parish has 5 substations constituted of 11 Small Christian Communities. Currently, Fr. Camilo Simoes is appointed as the Parish Priest.

=== Others ===
Pedne hosts an annual fair on Kojagiri poornima at Shri Bhagavati Temple premises.

== Tourism ==
This sub-district plays a major part in tourism of North Goa district. Famous places are Kerim or Querim Beach, Arambol Beach, Terekhol Fort, Mandrem beach, Ashwem Beach, Morjim Beach, Alorna Fort (near Alorna panchakroshi).

Also near Mlpem on NH-17 there is the Shri Mulveer Temple.

=== Casa de Hospides ===
Also called the House of Hospitality (in English), this building was built by the Portuguese for the Visconde de Pernem (Viscount of Pernem). It was basically a Guest house for Europeans visiting the northern frontier of Goa. The Hindu Deshprabhus the only family from India family to receive a Viscountship in all of European nobility reside in it to this date.

== Settlements ==
=== Cities ===
Cities in the district include: Pernem City. Though it may not be large enough to be considered a city, it serves as the Sub-district's capital.

=== Towns ===
Towns in the district include: Mandrem, Morjim, Arambol, Parcem

=== Villages ===
Villages in the district include: Agarvado, Alorna, Amberem, Cansarvornem, Casnem, Chandel, Chopdem, Corgão, Dargalim, Ibrampur, Mopa, Ozorim, Paliem, Pernem, Poroscodem, Querim, Tamboxem, Tiracol, Torxem, Tuem, Uguem, Varconda, Virnora.
