= Querim Beach =

Beach in Goa, India

Coordinates: 15.709°N 73.693°E

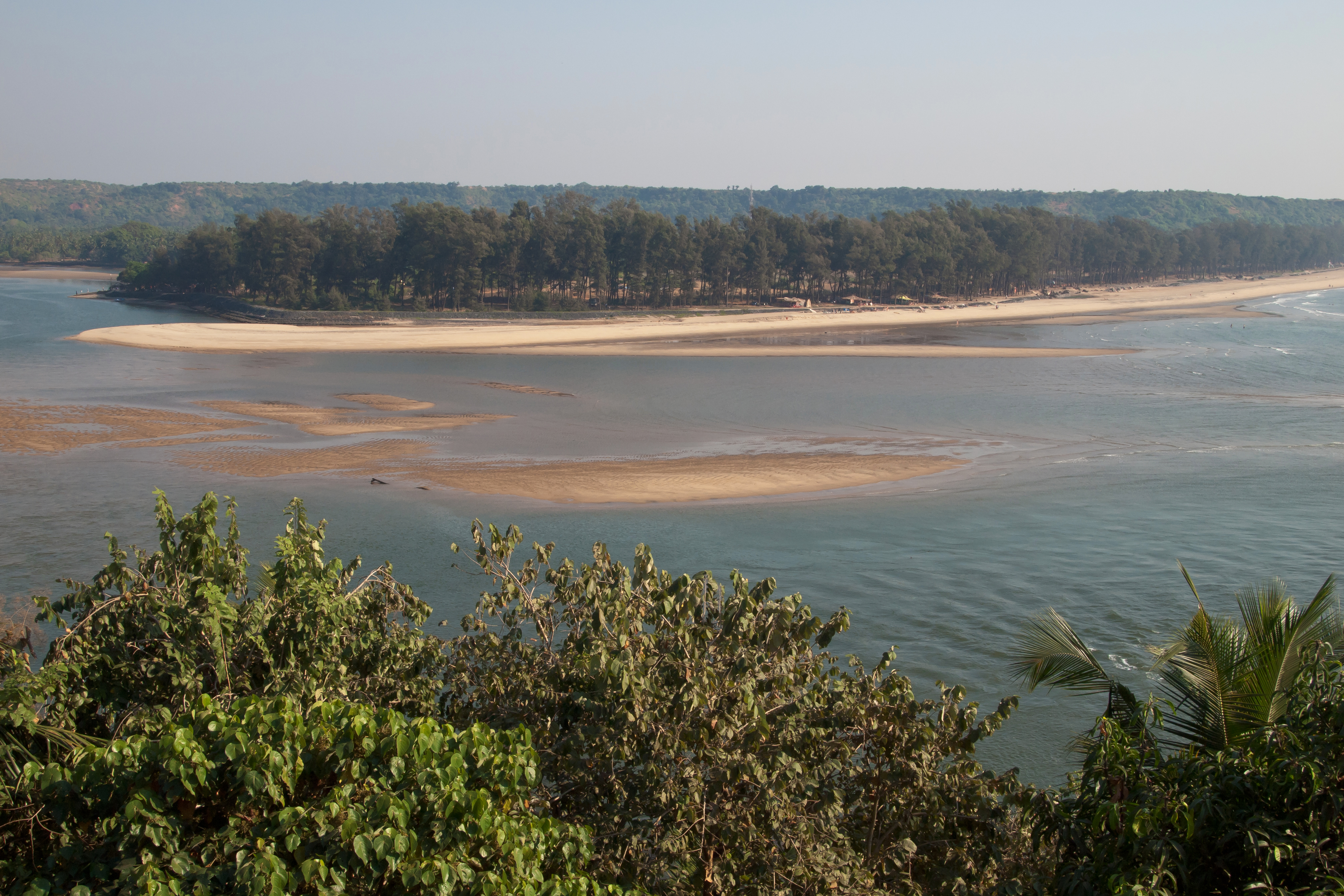
Querim Beach

Querim Beach is the sandy coastline of the Querim village of Pernem, Goa. It is the largest and northernmost beach in Goa. The beach comprises a long stretch of sand with a few rocky outcrops, rows of trees, and a river inlet of Tiracol River. It is north of the Arambol beach, but in order to reach there by foot, one has to walk through the hill and jungle between the Paliem Sweet Water Lake and Querim Beach. Querim is 30 kilometers from Mapusa. From the north side of Querim Beach, one can see a restaurant and bar on a high hill on the Tiracol side of the Tiracol River. There is also a resort by the name "Hotel Hill Rock" next to it, which is known for its peaceful atmosphere and has a small but well-equipped bistro on the property. On the highest cliff on the Tiracol side is the Fort Tiracol, which is now converted into a heritage hotel.

== See also ==
- Tourism in Goa
- Pernem
