= Patradevi =

- town
- Interactive map of Patradevi
- Coordinates: 15°47′47″N 73°51′47″E
- Country: India
- State: Goa
- District: North Goa

Languages
  - Official: Konkani
- Time zone: UTC+5:30 (IST)
- Vehicle registration: GA
- Website: goa.gov.in

Patradevi (Konkani: Potradeo) is a town in the Pernem taluk of Goa on the Goa-Maharashtra border. The Patradevi checkpost is located in this town.

There is a private bus service to Netarde.

== See also ==
- Pernem
- Mapusa
- Bicholim
- Savantwadi
- Banda
