= Querim =

Querim Keri (in Konkani)
- Village
- Location in Goa, India Querim (India)
- Coordinates: 15.713251°N 73.702764°E
- Country: India
- State: Goa
- District: North Goa
- Sub-District: Pernem

Government
  - Type: Village Panchayat
  - Body: Querim-Tiracol

Area
  - Total: 4.05 km^{2} (1.56 sq mi)

Population (2011)
  - Total: 3,038
  - Density: 750/km^{2} (1,940/sq mi)
- Demonym(s): Querikar, Kerikar

Languages
  - Official: Konkani
  - Former Official: Portuguese

Languages
- Time zone: UTC+5:30 (IST)
- PIN: 403524
- Vehicle registration: GA
- Website: www.querim-tiracolpanchayat.com

Querim or Keri is a village on the river mouth of the Tiracol River, part of the Pernem sub-division of North Goa, India. It is the northwesternmost point of the state, known for Querim Beach, the historic Church of St. Francis Xavier and a nearby Portuguese fortress.

A road connects the village to nearby Paliyem, and a ferry connects to Tiracol. The nearest town is Pernem.

== Querim Beach ==
Querim Beach is the sandy coastline of the Querim village. It is the largest northernmost beach in Goa. The beach comprises a long stretch of sand, a few rocky outcrops, rows of trees and a river inlet of Tiracol River. It is located to the north of the Arambol beach and village, but in order to reach there by foot, one has to walk through the hill and jungle between a Sweet Water Lake in Paliyem.
