= Kamlakant Chari =

Indian stage designer (1942–2014)

- Chari in an undated portrait released by Tiatr Academy of Goa in 2012
- Born: Comlo Naraina Chari; 17 November 1942; Parcem, Goa, Portuguese India, Portuguese Empire (now in India)
- Died: 1 May 2014 (aged 71); Goa Medical College, Bambolim, Goa, India
- Occupations: Stage designer; sound designer; lighting designer
- Years active: 1970s–2011
- Spouse: Bebi Babu Zo (m. 1979)
- Children: 1

Kamlakant Narayan Chari (born Comlo Naraina Chari; 17 November 1942 – 1 May 2014) was an Indian stage designer, light designer, and sound designer known for his work in Marathi theatre and tiatr productions.

== Early life ==
Kamlakant Narayan Chari, originally named Comlo Naraina Chari, was born on 17 November 1942, in Parcem, Goa, which was a part of Portuguese India during the era of the Portuguese Empire. He was born into a Hindu family to parents Naraina Comlo Chari (later Narayan Kamla Chari), hailing from Corgao-Pernem, and Loximin (later Laxmi Narayan Chari), who was a homemaker. Chari showed a strong interest in painting, design, acting, and mechanical work since he was young. His artistic path began with participating in Marathi plays in nearby villages. His stage presence was known for his acting talent, which held the audience's interest. He showed a strong enthusiasm for stage design, offering helpful ideas to improve the overall visual impact of theatrical productions. As time progressed, Chari realized his potential for innovative stage setting. This realization ignited his passion and spurred him to explore new horizons in stage design.

== Career ==
In the early stages of his career, Chari faced the challenge of not having his own stage sets and curtains. To surmount this challenge, he utilized a stage setting facility located in Mapusa, where he obtained the required stage props. At times, he even took on the responsibility of transporting all the curtains via bicycle from Mapusa to Panjim, returning them the next day after the event had ended. Chari's work and diligence yielded rewards in both his personal and professional life. Despite not achieving considerable financial success from his stage setting services, he established a reputation as a creative and well-liked stage set designer. Chari dedicated over four decades of his life to serving the Konkani tiatr stage by supplying essential stage settings. He belonged to a new wave of stage set designers, employing modern techniques and approaches. Initially, he catered to amateur tiatrists, gradually earning the opportunity to collaborate with directors such as Jacinto Vaz, M. Boyer, Fr. Freddy J. Da Costa, Remmie Colaço, and others. Through his work, Chari established a leading position for himself within the tiatr stage community. Furthermore, Chari extended his talent and expertise to Marathi dramas from the 1970s onwards. His distinctive stage settings garnered accolades and recognition not only within Goa but also at the national level.

Chari had the privilege of representing Goa at the National Theatre festival known as Bharat Rang Mahotsav. This festival, jointly organized by the National School of Drama in New Delhi and the Nehru Centre in Mumbai, served as a platform for showcasing theatrical talent from across the country. Furthermore, Chari was an active participant in multiple state-level theater festivals across cities like Mumbai, Delhi, Bangalore, Pune, and Kolhapur. During the 20th century, the influx of tiatr directors from Bombay to Goa brought about an interesting collaboration. Given the abundance of stage sets in Bombay, owing to the widespread production of dramas called nataks, these directors would transport the sets along with their productions. However, Chari's skills as a stage set designer caught the attention of popular tiatr directors like Prem Kumar and C. Alvares. Upon discovering his talent, they sought his assistance, and Chari willingly joined forces with them. While traveling through diverse villages and cities, Chari shared his knowledge with various tiatr directors, accompanied by his son Kapil, who offered assistance along the way. Although Kapil's involvement initially lacked a serious commitment, it laid the foundation for his future contributions. Chari's impact on the commercial tiatr stage was significant. In a milestone, he introduced stage sets for the first time in a tiatr production written and directed by Jacinto Vaz, a comedian of the tiatr stage. The quality of Chari's stage sets did not go unnoticed, earning admiration from other figures within the tiatr community.

During the peak period of tiatr stage shows, artists like M. Boyer, Prem Kumar, C. Alvares, Bab Peter, Mike Mehta, John Claro, Rosario Rodrigues, Roseferns, Prince Jacob, Pascoal, Mario Menezes, John D'Silva, Comedian Agostinho, Comedian Domnic, Peter Roshan, Fr. Freddy J. Da Costa, and others enlisted the skills of Chari to design stage sets for their tiatr performances. Chari's artistic abilities were not limited to the tiatr genre; he also showcased his creativity by designing unique stage sets for Chris Perry's musical productions in the 1970s. Chari's contributions were regarded in the annual competitions organized by the Kala Academy, where he crafted stage sets for the award-winning tiatrs of artists like Tomazinho Cardozo and Cezar D'Mello, among others.

His prowess in stage setting transcended cultural boundaries, as he left a mark on the Marathi stage as well. Nationally recognized for his set designing and execution, Chari's productions included Kalokh Det Hunkar, Junction Bharatpur, Themb Themb Abhal, Swapnavasavdatta, Pratima, Demaiz, Waiting Room, Natasamrat, Sandhya Chaya, Kulavadhu, and Naganand. In addition to his artistic endeavors, Chari dedicated himself to public service, serving as a panch (member) in the Merces village panchayat for a complete term from 1979 to 1983. Testament to his work and skill, Chari's collaboration with Prince Jacob's Production endured for a span of 28 years, starting around the year 1985. Chari's influence extended to other tiatr productions as well. He contributed his stage design skills to Augie D'Mello and Anil Kumar's tiatr lxob (2009), Joaquim Dias's tiatr Asha (2011), and Salvador Fernandes's tiatr Thank You Doctor (2011).

== Personal life ==
On 23 April 1979, Chari, aged 37, entered into matrimony with Bebi Babu Zo, a 28-year-old homemaker from Agaçaim. The couple underwent the process of civil marriage registration in Panaji, with Chari asserting his birthplace as Merces, Goa, despite the discrepancy with his birth certificate stating Parcem. Their son Kapil (born 1981), would later embark on a career as a stage designer in the realm of Konkani theater. Following the death of his father, Kapil embraced the responsibility of upholding and advancing his father's artistic legacy. He directed his focus towards stage sets, dedicating himself to the family business while eschewing involvement in the realms of decorations and sound systems. Chari, known for his proficiency in carpentry and painting curtains, was characterized by his strong work ethic, as he exhibited a greater inclination towards diligent labor rather than entrepreneurial pursuits.

On 1 May 2014, Chari, aged 71, died at Goa Medical College in Bambolim.
