= Paliem, Pernem, Goa =

Paliem Paliyem
- village
- Location in Goa, India Paliem (India)
- Coordinates: 15°43′0″N 73°42′0″E
- Country: India
- State: Goa
- District: North Goa
- Sub-District: Pernem

Area
  - Total: 9.9964 km^{2} (3.8596 sq mi)
- Elevation: 7 m (23 ft)

Population (2011)
  - Total: 2,776
  - Density: 277.7/km^{2} (719.2/sq mi)
- Demonym: Paliekar

Languages
  - Official: Konkani
  - Former Official: Portuguese
- Time zone: UTC+5:30 (IST)
- Postal code: 626637
- Vehicle registration: GA 11
- Website: villagepanchayatpaliem.com/paliem-village/

Paliem is a village in the Pernem Sub-Division of North Goa, India.

== Geography ==
It is located at 15°43′0″N 73°42′0″E at an elevation of 7 m above MSL. This village is located between Arambol, Corgão and Querim.

== Places To Visit ==
Paliem Beach also called Kalacha Beach is a small stretch of sandy coastline 2km from the village. Not far from the beach one can find a fresh water lake, which is actually a lagoon.

== Transport ==
Pernem is the nearest railway station. Paliem is near National Highway 17.
