= Morjim =

- Town
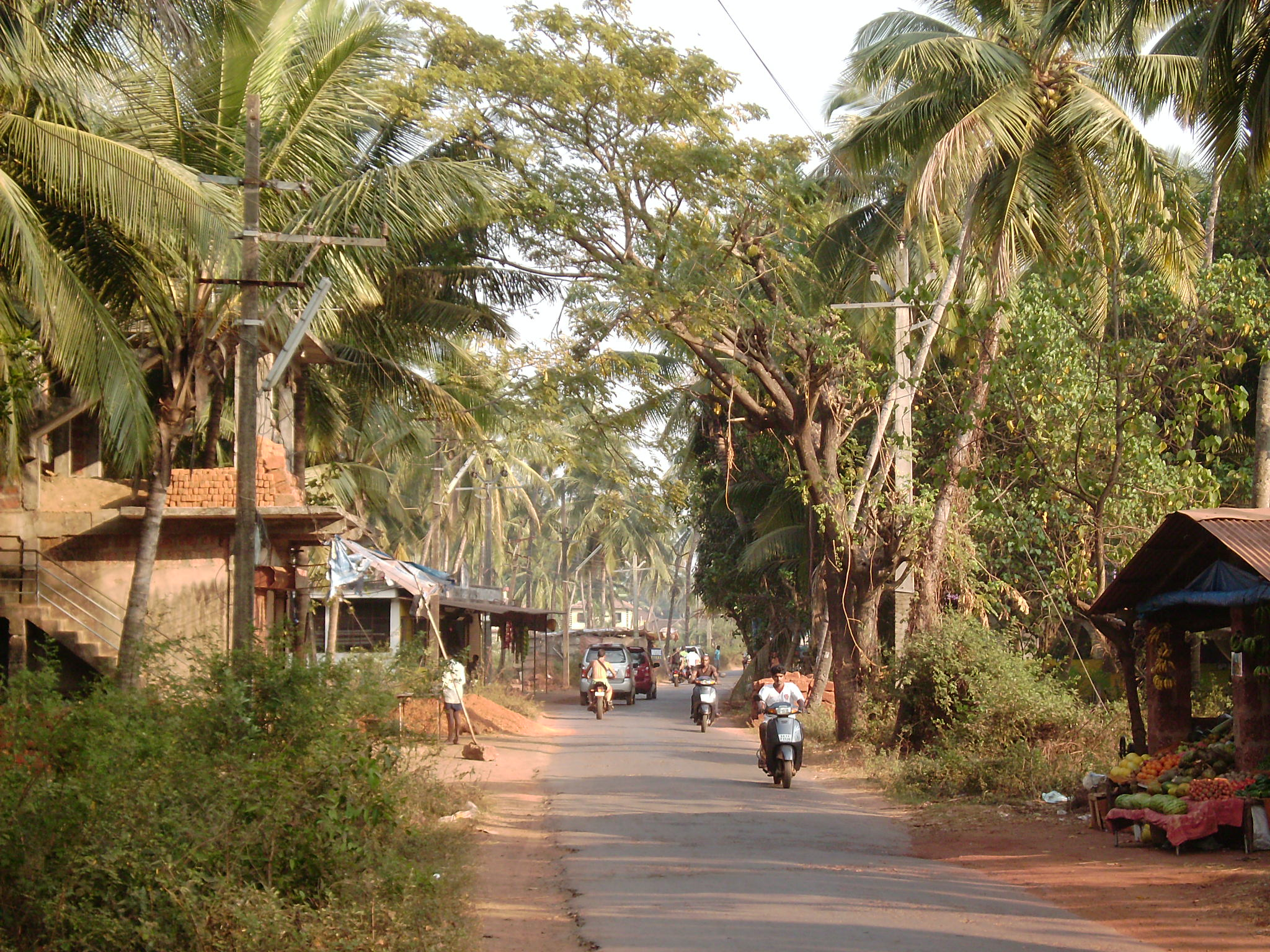
- A road in Morjim, 2010

- Location of Morjim in Goa Morjim (India)
- Coordinates: 15°37′46″N 73°44′09″E
- Country: India
- State: Goa
- District: North Goa
- Sub-district: Pernem

Population
  - Total: 6,760
- Time zone: UTC+5:30 (IST)
- Postcode: 403512
- Area code: 0832

Morjim (pronounced Morji; the second m is silent) is a census town in Pernem, Goa, India. It is situated on the northern bank of the Chapora River estuary. It is home to a variety of birds and is a nesting site for Olive Ridley sea turtles. The village has become known as "Little Russia" because of the concentration of Russian immigrants living there.

== Demographics ==
As of the 2011 India census, Morjim Census Town has population of 6,760 of which 3,356 are males while 3,404 are females.The population of children aged 0-6 is 609 which is 9.01% of total population of Morjim (CT). In Morjim Census Town, Female Sex Ratio is of 1014 against state average of 973. Moreover, the child sex ratio in Morjim is around 1010 compared to Goa state average of 942. The literacy rate of Morjim city is 89.90% higher than the state average of 88.70%. In Morjim, male literacy is around 94.69% while the female literacy rate is 85.18%

=== Russian presence ===
Local politicians have condemned the Russian presence, claiming that Russian visitors are rude, associated with crime, and involved in running businesses in violation of the Foreign Exchange Management Act.

The boom of Russian tourists in Morjim village, in the state’s north, has had a flipside. In a recent gram sabha meeting, dismayed villagers objected to the proliferation of signboards in Russian language, prompting the local panchayat to promise these will be taken down. In response to such complaints, Vikram Varma, a Goa-based lawyer in the employ of Russia's Mumbai consulate, said that of the tens of thousands of Russian visitors to and residents in the area, fifteen were implicated in illegal property deals in 2007 and two were arrested for drugs possession in 2008. He also said Russian visitors as a whole contribute roughly ₹4 billion to the local economy each year and form 40% of hotel occupancies. Nearly 75% of chartered flights to Goa come from Russia. Consul General Alexander Novikov said there is no Russian mafia in the State despite the consulate's lawyer saying the contrary.

In April 2013, Goa Chief Minister (CM) Manohar Parrikar, who is also Home Minister in charge of Police, told the legislative assembly in Goa that Russian, German or Israeli mafias were not operating in the state. He was responding to a question raised by Congress legislator Aleixo Reginaldo Lourenco. Parrikar said "unobtrusive watch" is maintained on the activities of the foreigners staying in Goa. "If any foreigner is found involved in any crime, legal action as per the law is taken", he said.

The Goa BJP Chief Minister was saying the same thing as what North Goa Police Chief said when Congress Govt was in power before BJP. North Goa's superintendent of police had said "it would be an exaggeration to talk of a Russian mafia in Goa, though there have been Russians who have hidden facts about themselves from both the Goa government and the home country.".

During the three and a half years up to August 2014, the police have registered 182 narcotic cases in the state. The nationalities of those arrested for selling drugs are mostly from Nigeria, followed by Nepalese, Indians and Britishers".

Michael Lobo, Goa's member of legislative assembly for Calangute, told Russian media that local sentiments are only against those foreigners engaged in illegal business activities in the state. Michael said "We welcome all international tourists including the Russians, whoever is going to boost our economy. There are some Russians who are doing illegal business. When I say illegal businesses, I mean businesses which are meant to be run by the local Goans and the Indians, especially where restaurants are concerned. If they come on a business visa or a work visa, they are welcome to do business in Goa."

Francisco de Braganca, president, Travel & Tourism Association of Goa (TTAG) in Sept 14 spoke about the contribution made by Russian Tourists. He said "Russia has over the years provided high number of tourists to Goa and this turf needs to be protected. There is a wrong impression about Russians in Goa on account of few issues which have happened between them and local people. However, we must not forget that Russians are amiable people and on account of their difficulty to speak any other language have a tendency to mix among themselves. We need to respect their sensibilities. Goa has not treated Russians well enough even after it has been the largest provider of charter tourists. Our mind set has to change".

Goa Chief Minister Manohar Parrikar does not believe that Russian and Israeli mafias operate in Goa, but according to leaked diplomatic cables, Mumbai police are sure of it. A US diplomatic cable dispatched by Mumbai Consul General Paul A. Folmsbee in 2009 quotes former head of Mumbai Crime Branch Rakesh Maria saying trafficking of foreign women prostitutes to Mumbai is controlled by Israeli and Russian mafia lords operating from Goa. "Maria alleged that most trafficking of foreigners to Mumbai is connected to Russian and Israeli mafia operations in Goa, explaining why Mumbai police had not cracked the trafficking ring(s)," Folmsbee's cable to the US administration said.

Rajan Ghate, a secretary of the state unit of the NCP, has demanded a thorough probe by the Central Bureau of Investigation (CBI) into the nexus between the Land Mafia, Politicians and revenue officials, which is already being probed by the Enforcement Directorate (ED).

In August 2012, Eduardo Faleiro, former Union Minister, reiterated the Russian mafia threat to Morjim and Goa. He said, "Russians with criminal background are buying properties through benami means". The state health minister Laxmikant Parsekar said at a gram sabha meeting at the Morjim village panchayat that "these Russians have all kinds of vices and the moment the Russian tourists come to one place all other tourists flee from there. Even earlier, we had tourists from other countries but we never had this problem." Parsekar said the quantity of Russian tourists in the state had triggered a virtual cultural invasion in Morjim and surrounding areas and because of their sheer numbers, the Russians were indulging in dadagiri.

At 0:00 on 31 December 2012, a resort called Club Fresh was vandalised by an armed gang consisting of more than 20 men in retaliation over business quarrels. Guests including children were injured and property damage to the resort was incurred.

== Beach ==
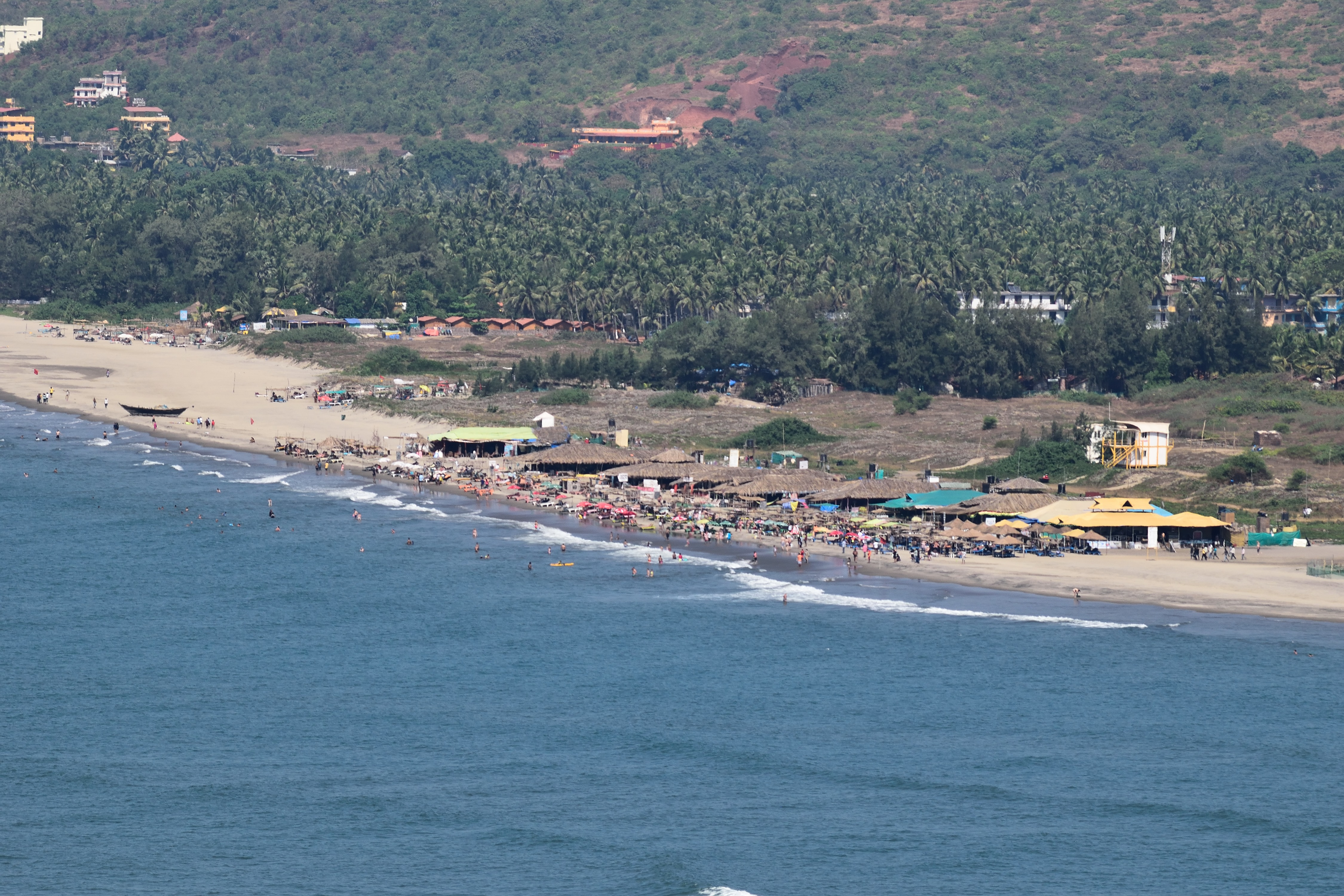
Morjim Beach in Goa

Morjim Beach is a nesting and hatching habitat of the Olive ridley sea turtle, an endangered species. They are afforded the highest degree of protection under Indian law through their inclusion in Schedule I of the Wildlife Protection Act of 1972. Egg-poaching or in any manner disturbing the turtles or their habitat is an offence punishable under Indian law.

Protection of marine turtles and their habitat has been embraced by the local community through community-based conservation efforts. These efforts were begun between 1995 and 1996 by a number of local villagers after discussions with Goa-based environmental protection groups. Before this time, the eggs were poached by fishermen, but later the fishermen became fiercely protective of marine turtles.

The Goa Forest Department supports the turtle conservation efforts and has set up a Turtle Conservation Interpretation Centre at the Forest Office in Pernem using funds allotted by the Central Government of India. The Forest Department pays a monthly stipend to young, local volunteers involved in marine turtle conservation efforts in Morjim. A few of these volunteers have found jobs with the Forest Department in recognition of their efforts. Some youth of Morjim have campaigned internationally on the Greenpeace ship Rainbow Warrior.

The Tourism Department of the Government of Goa has aided the conservation efforts by restricting temporary seasonal structures (e.g. shacks) to a portion of the beach and requiring them to operate only during daylight hours. Owners of the structures are also legally obliged not to leave beach furniture on the beach after daylight hours and not to do anything that would adversely affect marine turtle conservation.Despite the ban, an Indian fashion show with illumination and music was held well into the night on 10 December 2011, flouting the law and outraging environmentalists and locals.

In 2011 the turtles can hardly be seen because of urbanization, light pollution and noise pollution. According to a recent study of international researchers Morjim Wildlife is doomed and the village is said to be turning into be the next Calangute, turning into a dense center of tourism activity.

In March 2023, The Bombay high court, has ordered a crackdown on beach parties being held in the vicinity of turtle nesting sites along Goa’s beaches and called for an inquiry into the impact of late-night beach parties at beachfront shacks along Goa’s protected turtle nesting beaches at Morjim and Ashvem in North Goa.
