= Mopa, Goa =

Village in Goa, India

Mopa
- Village, Hamlet
- Mopa
- Nickname: De Mará
- Location of Mopa in Goa Mopa (India)
- Coordinates: 15°45′12″N 73°51′25″E
- Country: India
- State: Goa
- District: North Goa
- Sub-district: Pernem
- Time zone: UTC+5:30 (IST)
- Vehicle registration: GA
- Website: goa.gov.in

Mopa is a village near Pernem, Goa, India. Manohar International Airport is located at Mopa.
