= Pernem =

Pernem Pedne
- Town / Sub-District Capital
- Igreja de São José Pernem (1855)

- Location within Goa Location within India
- Coordinates: 15.716740°N 73.796996°E
- Country: India
- State: Goa
- District: North Goa
- Established: Early 1800s

Government
  - MLA: Pravin Prabhakar Arlekar
  - Chairperson: Manoj Harmalker

Area
  - Total: 4 km^{2} (1.5 sq mi)
- Elevation: 6 m (20 ft)

Population (2011)
  - Total: 70,726
  - Density: 18,000/km^{2} (46,000/sq mi)
- Demonym(s): Pednekar, Pernecar

Languages
  - Official: Konkani
  - Also spoken: English, Portuguese, Marathi

Religions
  - Dominant: Hinduism 93.13%
  - Minor: Christianity 5.08%
  - Historical: Roman Catholicism
- Time zone: UTC+5:30 (IST)
- Postcode: 403512
- Telephone code: 0832 2201

Pernem (Peddnne; [pɛːɽɳɛ̃ː]) is a town and a municipal council in North Goa district in the Indian state of Goa. It is the capital of the Pernem Sub-District.

== Geography ==
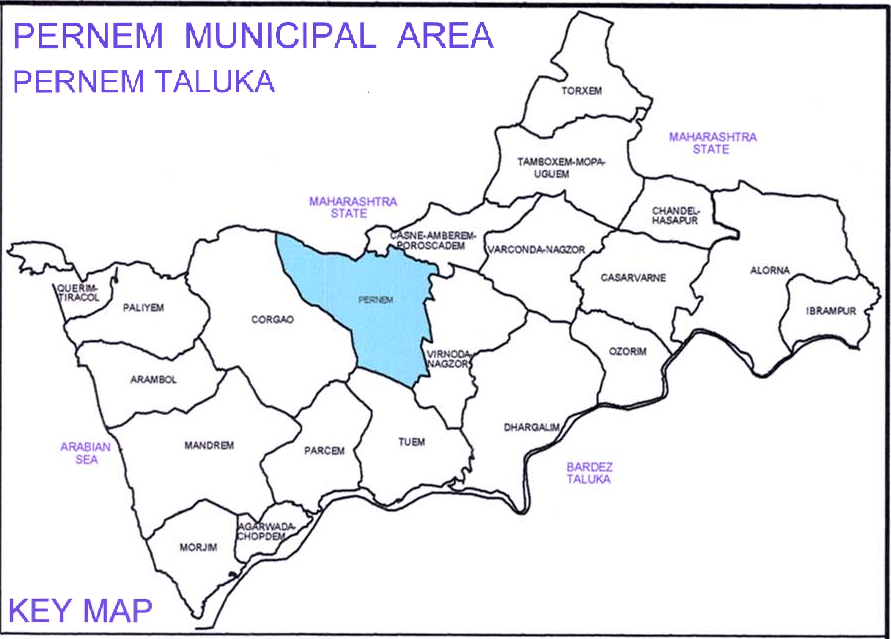
Pernem Municipal Area, with the Sub-District of Pernem, Goa.

Pernem is one of the twelve sub-districts of Goa. It consists of twenty village panchayats and one municipality (Pernem city), and is surrounded by Vengurla and Sawantwadi sub-districts of Sindhudurga to the north, Dodamarg sub-district of Sindhudurga to the east, Bardez and Bicholim to the south and the Arabian Sea to the west.

Villages and towns in the area include Agarvado, Alorna, Amberem, Arambol, Cansarvornem, Casnem, Chandel, Chopdem, Corgao, Dargalim, Ibrampur, Mandrem, Morjim, Mopa, Ozorim, Paliem, Parcem, Pernem, Poroscodem, Querim, Tamboxem, Tiracol, Torxem, Tuem, Uguem, Varconda and Virnora.

Pernem has two waterfalls, one in the Mauli Temple area at Sarmale and another in the Mulvir Temple area at Malpe.

== Demographics ==
As of 2011, Pernem has a population of 70,726, of which 36,095 are male and 34,631 are female. The literacy rate is 79.7%, with the male literacy rate at 84.1% and the female literacy rate at 75.3%.

It is estimated that Pernem's population is around 90,529 at 2022.

== Religion ==
=== Igreja de São José ===
A chapel was built in 1852 by the Portuguese after their successful Nova Conquistador campaign. It was elevated into a Parish on 2 January 1855. St. Joseph Church was rebuilt in 1864 and renovated in 2002. The Parish has 5 substations constituted of 11 small Christian communities. Fr. Paulo Dias is the Parish Priest.

=== Hindu Festivals ===
Pernem is famous for Vijayadashami. The festival spans 5 days, ending on Kojagiri Purnima. On the day of Kojagiri Pournima one of Goa's biggest feasts is organised. Temples include Adisthan Mangar, Bhagwati, Rawalnath, Bhootnath, Sateri, Dwarpal, Mauli, Gautameshwar, Narayan, Mulvir, Maruti and Shri somnath.

== Economy ==
There is no major source of income in the sub-district. The sub-district market is not large. Most of the people depend on other regions for employment. Pernem hosts around 300 to 400 small and medium enterprises. The Thursday weekly market is the second largest in North Goa.

== Government and politics ==
Pernem is part of Pernem Assembly constituency and North Goa Lok Sabha constituency.

== Education ==
There are four high schools in Pernem, namely Vikas High School, Viscount of Pernem High School, Shree Bhagwati and St. Joseph. Higher education is pursued at Govt Higher Secondary of Commerce, Arts, Science & Vocational studies, Govt College Sohirobanath Ambiye college of arts and commerce. There are no institutions for higher education for Science, Engineering and Medicine in Pernem.

== Medical facilities ==
There is one hospital in Pernem, the Government Health Centre.

== Transport ==
Pernem is well connected, by Air (Manohar International Airport), road and the Konkan Railway. Pernem railway station is the first railway station in Goa for inbound trains from Mumbai. The Mandovi Express, Konkan Kanya Express and Goa Sampark Kranti Express stop there. National Highway 66 passes through the area, connecting it to Mumbai, Pune and Mangaluru.

=== Casa de Hospides ===
Also called the House of Hospitality (in English), this building was built by the Portuguese for the Visconde de Pernem (Viscount of Pernem). It was basically a Guest house for Europeans visiting the northern frontier of Goa. The Hindu Deshprabhus the only family from India family to receive a Viscountship in all of European nobility reside in it to this date.

== List of towns and villages ==
List of towns in Pernem taluk:

- Mandrem Census Town
- Morjim Census Town
- Arambol Census Town
- Pernem Municipal Council
- Parcem Census Town

List of villages in Pernem taluk:

- Agarvado
- Alorna
- Amberem
- Cansarvornem
- Casnem
- Chandel, Pernem
- Chopdem
- Corgao
- Dhargalim
- Ibrampur
- Mopa
- Ozorim
- Paliem
- Pernem
- Poroscodem
- Querim
- Tamboxem
- Tiracol
- Torxem
- Tuem
- Uguem
- Varconda
- Virnora

== Notable people ==
- Atmaram Deshprabhu, member of Portuguese India Legislative Council and 1st Viscount of Pernem
- Jitendra Deshprabhu, Member of Legislative Assembly and Viscount of Pernem
- Vasudeva Deshprabhu, member of Portuguese India Legislative Council and 1st Baron of Pernem
- Anjanibai Malpekar, classical singer
- Prabhakar Panshikar, theatre artist
- Bhumi Pednekar, Bollywood actress
- Kishori Pednekar, Mayor of Mumbai
- Satish Pednekar, ex Minister for Home and Labour, Govt of Maharashtra
