= Netarde =

Village in Maharashtra, India

- Village
- Location within Maharashtra Location within India
- Coordinates: 15°45′24″N 73°53′31″E
- Country: India
- State: Maharashtra
- District: Sindhudurg
- Taluk: Sawantwadi

Government
  - Type: Gram Panchayat

Area
  - Total: 6.72 km^{2} (2.59 sq mi)
- Elevation: 31 m (102 ft)

Population (2011)
  - Total: 990
  - Density: 150/km^{2} (380/sq mi)

Language
  - Official: Marathi
- Time zone: UTC+5:30 (IST)
- PIN: 416511
- STD code: 02363
- Vehicle registration: MH-07

Netarde is a village in Sawantwadi Taluk, Sindhudurg District, Maharashtra, India. It is located along the state border with Goa, about 45 kilometres southeast of the district capital Oros, and 18 kilometres southeast of the taluk capital Sawantwadi. As of 2011, it had a population of 990.

== Geography ==
Netarde is located to the east of the Terekhol River. It covers an area of 672.39 hectares.

== Demographics ==
According to the 2011 Census of India, there were 252 households within Netarde. Among the local residents, 479 were male and 511 were female. The literacy rate was 73.33%, with 386 of the male inhabitants and 340 of the female inhabitants being literate.
