= Hanuman Natyagraha =

Theatre centre in Goa, India

Coordinates: 15.590°N 73.810°E

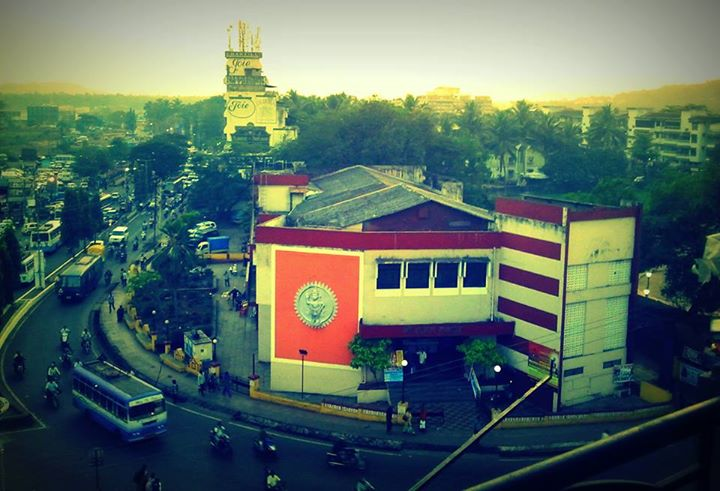
Aerial shot of the theatre centre, 2015

Hanuman Natyagraha is a prominent theatre centre, which hosts plays primarily in the Konkani and Marathi languages, in the North Goa commercial town of Mapusa.

== History ==
The Hanuman Natyagraha was established in the late 1970s as an initiative of the Hanuman Temple Committee of Mapusa to provide a dedicated venue for Konkani and Marathi theatrical performances (tiatr and natak) in North Goa. Built adjacent to the town's central Hanuman temple, the auditorium originally named "Hanuman Bhavan" was funded through community donations and designed to seat approximately 800 patrons, including a 300‑seat balcony that quickly made it Mapusa's premier cultural landmark.

Throughout the 1980s and 1990s, Hanuman Natyagraha hosted dozens of annual tiatr festivals and became instrumental in the growth of Goa's Konkani theatre movement, launching the careers of leading playwrights and actors in the region. By the 2000s, however, the facility showed signs of wear like aging seating, inadequate ventilation, and an outdated stage setup limited its ability to attract larger productions. In 2018, the Times of India reported that the temple committee had drafted a ₹1.5 crore renovation plan covering air conditioning, seating replacement, and lighting upgrades to restore Hanuman Natyagraha to its former status as Goa's leading theatre centre. Responding to growing concerns, the temple committee and Government of Goa pledged ₹30 lakh in 2019 for improvements, though progress remained slow amid funding shortfalls and debates over whether to renovate in phases or rebuild entirely.
