= Alorna =

Alorna Halarn
- village
- Location in Goa, India Alorna (India)
- Coordinates: 15°42′57″N 73°53′55″E
- Country: India
- State: Goa
- District: North Goa
- Sub-District: Pernem
- Demonym: Halarnekar

Languages
  - Official: Konkani
  - Former Official: Portuguese
- Time zone: UTC+5:30 (IST)
- Vehicle registration: GA 11

Alorna (Halarn) is a village in the Pernem Sub-Division of North Goa, India. Alorna is famous for the Alorna Fort.

== Geography ==
It is located at 15°42′57″N 73°53′55″E. This village is boundered by Menkurem to the south, Ibrampur and Sal to the east, Hansapur and the Maharashtra inter-state border to the north, and Chandel and Cansarvornem to its west.

== Fort in the village ==
The Times of India newspaper, saying that "there was a time when many bitter battles were fought over [this fort's] possession" notes that Alorna fort has "all but faded into oblivion". This news-report also points to reports of the Goa Department of Archives and Archaeology reviving the fort (in June 2018) "after more than a century of neglect".
