= Alfred Alfonso =

Indian independence activist (1924–1986)

- Born: 11 March 1924; Galjibaga, Canacona taluka, Portuguese Goa
- Died: 10 September 1986 (aged 62)
- Education: Senior Cambridge
- Movement: Goan independence movement

Alfred Afonso (11 March 1924 – 10 September 1986) was an Indian independence activist and trade union leader. He is best known for leading a group of Satyagrahis to capture the Terekhol Fort during the Goan independence movement in 1954.

== Early life and education ==
Afonso was born on 11 March 1924, at Galjibaga in the Canacona taluka of Portuguese Goa to Anthony Francisco Afonso. He completed his education up to the Senior Cambridge level.

== Goan independence movement ==
Beginning in 1946, Afonso was active in the Bombay Goan community, where he conducted political propaganda to raise awareness about the Goan independence movement. In 1951, an arrest warrant was issued against him. In 1952, he was chosen as the president of the Bombay branch of the National Congress (Goa) (NCG) and later became a member of its Executive Committee.

In 1954, Afonso resigned from the Bombay Telephones to dedicate himself fully to the independence movement.

On 15 August 1954, he led a group of 14 satyagrahis from Siroda to the Terekhol Fort. The group successfully captured the fort, hoisted the Indian tricolour, and controlled the fort for one day. Following this action, he and the other activists were arrested. During his transfer to police custody in Panaji, he was physically assaulted before and during his detention. He was then tried by the Portuguese Territorial Military Tribunal (TMT). On 31 March 1955, he was sentenced to eight years of rigorous imprisonment followed by three years of simple imprisonment. He was held at the Aguada Fort and was eventually released on 17 May 1959.

== Later career ==
Afonso later became a union leader. He was a key organizer of the National Trade Union Congress in Goa and served as the General Secretary of the National Mine Workers' Union. Professionally, he worked as a manager for a mining firm.

== Accolades ==
On 18 June 1981, the Government of Goa, Daman and Diu honoured him for his contributions to the Goan independence movement.

In 2024, it was announced that a statue of Alfonso would be placed at Terekhol in his honour. This was after some protests regarding the removal of a plaque stating his contribution to the independence movement. A book documenting his trial by the Portuguese was also released by the Goa government.

== Death ==
Alfonso died on 10 September 1986.
