= Aronda =

Village in Maharashtra

- village
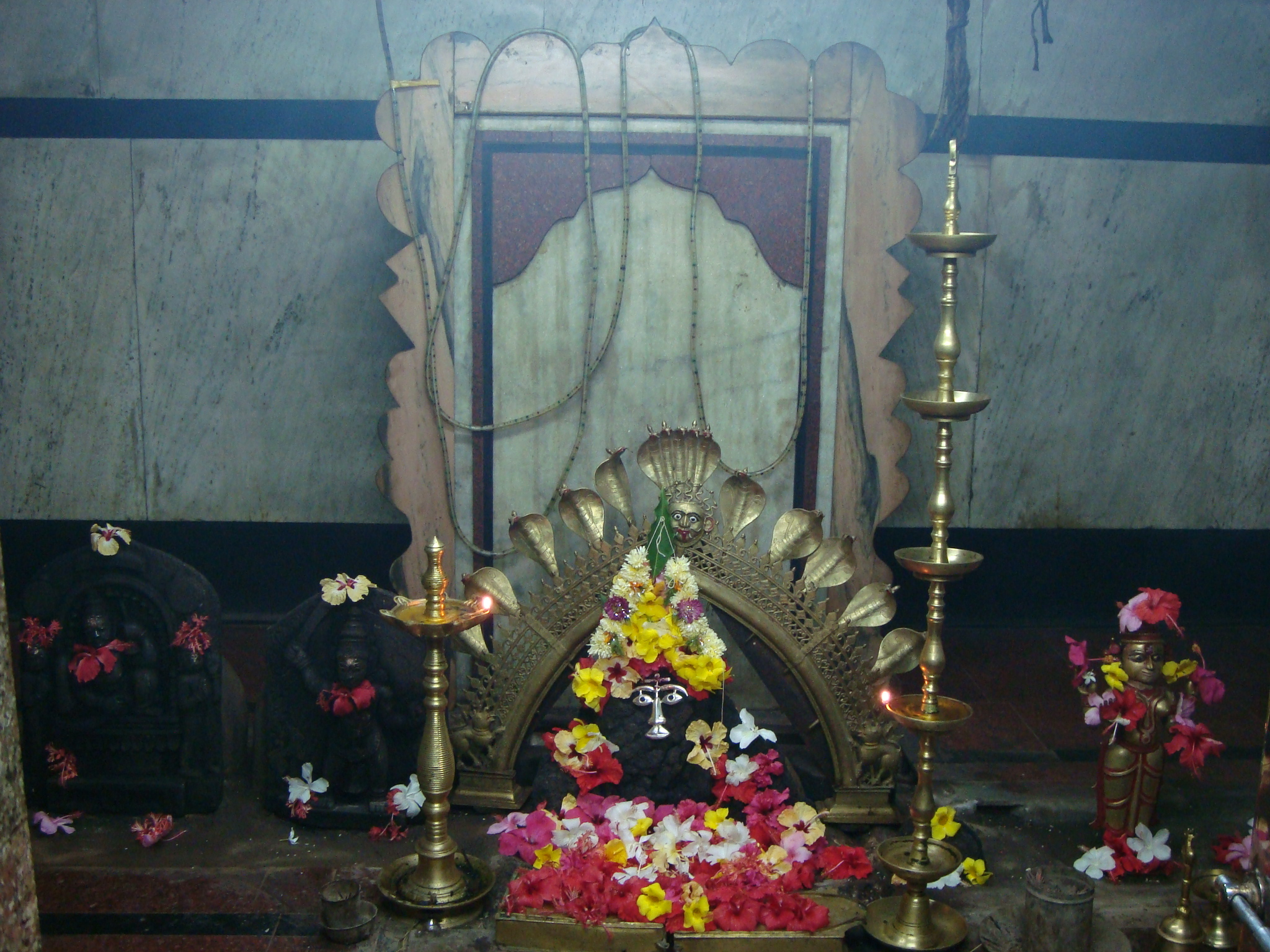
- Shrine to the gramdevata of Aronda

- Location in Maharashtra, India Aronda (India)
- Coordinates: 15°44′37.26″N 73°43′6.26″E
- Country: India
- State: Maharashtra
- District: Sindhudurg

Government
  - Body: Gram Panchayat

Area
  - Total: 4.95 km^{2} (1.91 sq mi)
- Elevation: 20 m (66 ft)

Population (2011)
  - Total: 2,465
  - Density: 498/km^{2} (1,290/sq mi)

Languages
  - Official: Marathi
- Time zone: UTC+5:30 (IST)
- Vehicle registration: MH-07
- Nearest city: Sawantwadi, Vengurla, Pernem, Mapusa
- Lok Sabha constituency: Ratnagiri Sindhudurg.
- Civic agency: Gram Panchayat

Aronda is a village in the Sindhudurg district, Maharashtra state, India. It is a port on the boundary of Goa and Maharashtra, next to Terekhol River. As of 2011, the village had a population of 2,465.

== Geography ==
Aronda is located along the southern edge of Sindhudurg district, at an average elevation of 20 metres above the sea level. It has a total land area of 495.48 hectares.

== Climate ==
Aronda has a Tropical monsoon climate (Am). It receives the most rainfall in July, with 874 mm of precipitation; and the least rainfall in January and February, with virtually no precipitation.

Climate data for Aronda
Month	Jan	Feb	Mar	Apr	May	Jun	Jul	Aug	Sep	Oct	Nov	Dec	Year
Mean daily maximum °C (°F)	30.0 (86.0)	30.4 (86.7)	31.0 (87.8)	32.0 (89.6)	31.7 (89.1)	28.1 (82.6)	26.9 (80.4)	26.8 (80.2)	27.6 (81.7)	29.3 (84.7)	30.5 (86.9)	30.5 (86.9)	29.6 (85.2)
Daily mean °C (°F)	25.7 (78.3)	26.2 (79.2)	27.3 (81.1)	28.7 (83.7)	28.9 (84.0)	26.5 (79.7)	25.5 (77.9)	25.3 (77.5)	25.8 (78.4)	26.7 (80.1)	26.9 (80.4)	26.2 (79.2)	26.6 (80.0)
Mean daily minimum °C (°F)	21.4 (70.5)	21.8 (71.2)	23.5 (74.3)	25.6 (78.1)	26.5 (79.7)	25.3 (77.5)	24.6 (76.3)	24.3 (75.7)	24.2 (75.6)	24.5 (76.1)	23.6 (74.5)	22.3 (72.1)	24.0 (75.1)
Average rainfall mm (inches)	0 (0)	0 (0)	5 (0.2)	5 (0.2)	72 (2.8)	686 (27.0)	874 (34.4)	589 (23.2)	284 (11.2)	146 (5.7)	28 (1.1)	5 (0.2)	2,694 (106)
Source: Climate-Data.org
