= Tiracol =

- Village
- Location in Goa, India Tiracol (India)
- Coordinates: 15.724248°N 73.688209°E
- Country: India
- State: Goa
- District: North Goa
- Sub-District: Pernem
- Established: 1747
- Founder: Pedro Miguel de Almeida

Government
  - Type: Village Panchayat
  - Body: Querim-Tiracol

Area
  - Total: 2 km^{2} (0.77 sq mi)

Population (2011)
  - Total: 205
  - Density: 100/km^{2} (270/sq mi)
- Demonym: Tiracolkar

Languages
  - Official: Konkani
  - Former Official: Portuguese

Languages
- Time zone: UTC+5:30 (IST)
- PIN: 403524
- Vehicle registration: GA
- Website: www.querim-tiracolpanchayat.com

Tiracol is a village on the river right mouth of the Tiracol River and part of the Pernem Sub-Division of North Goa. Due to its location, it is geographically separated from Goa by land making it a Goan exclave in Maharashtra. It also happens to be the North-Western most point of the state. It is well known for its historical Portuguese era Fort and Churches.

Though there is a road connecting the village to neighboring village of Redi, Maharashtra, the most frequented mode of entry is the ferry from Querim.

== Tiracol Fort and Church ==
Fort Tiracol, is a Portuguese era fort turned luxury hotel near the village of Tiracol. It houses the 17th Century Church of St. Anthony within its walls, which is still frequented by local residents.

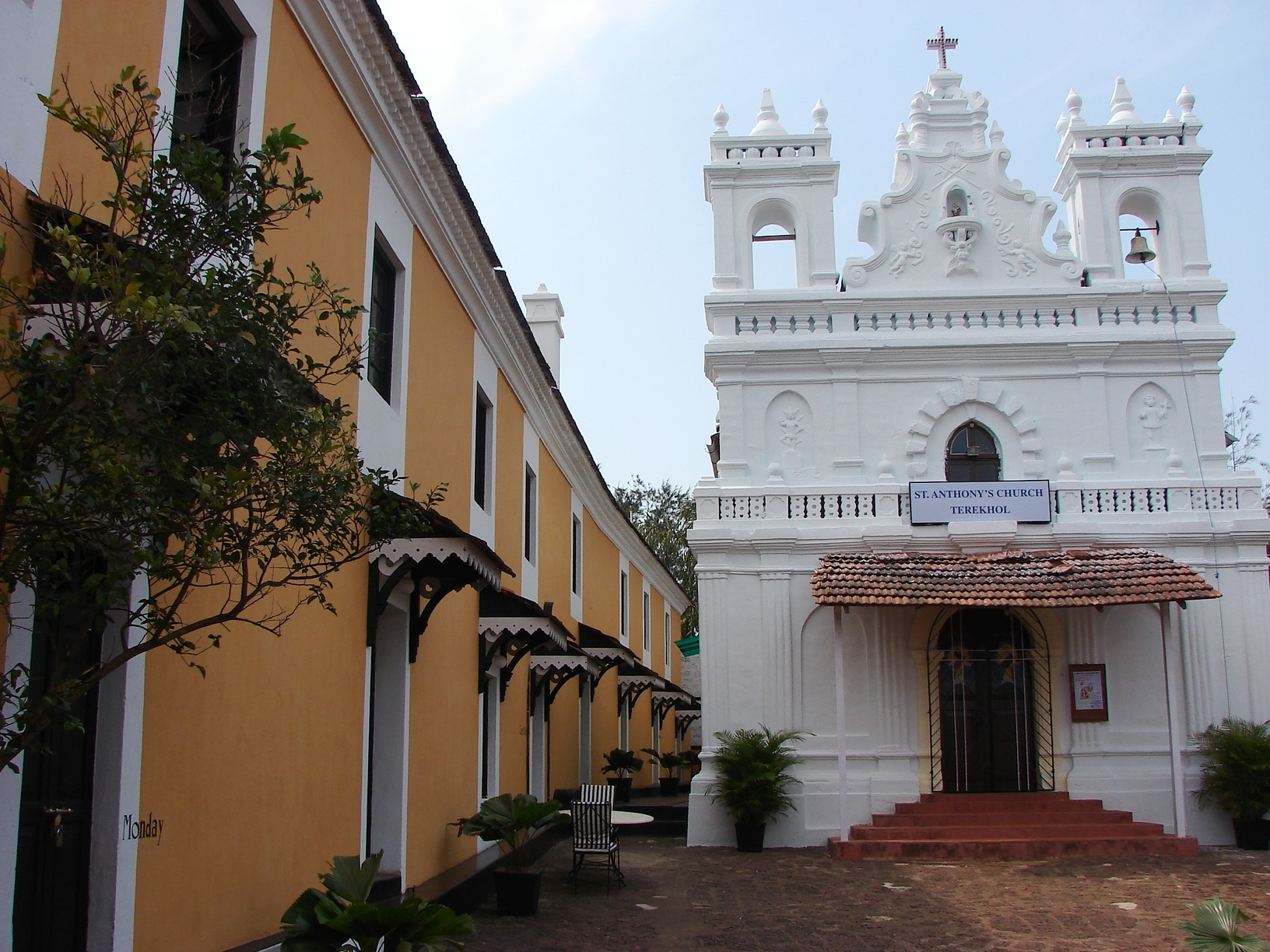
Church of St. Anthony
