= Terekhol River =

Coordinates: 15°43′N 73°42′E

Terekhol River Tiracol River
- Terekhol River, with Goa on the left and Maharashtra on the right

Location
- Country: India
- States: Goa, Maharashtra
- Districts: North Goa, Sindhudurg,
- Sub Districts: Pernem, Bicholim
- Villages: Tiracol, Querim,

Physical characteristics
- Source: undefined
  - location: Maharashtra
  - coordinates: 15.934516, 73.861644
  - elevation: 5,220 m (17,130 ft)
- Mouth: Arabian Sea, Indian Ocean
  - location: India
  - coordinates: 15.720467, 73.690546
- Basin size: 435 square kilometres (168 sq mi)
- Width
  - maximum: 1 km (0.62 mi)
- Depth
  - minimum: 0.2 m (0.66 ft)
  - maximum: 20 m (66 ft)
- Discharge
  - average: 20.9 cubic metres per second (740 cu ft/s; 20,900 L/s; 5,500 USgal/s)
  - minimum: 18 cubic metres per second (640 cu ft/s; 18,000 L/s; 4,800 USgal/s)
  - maximum: 34 cubic metres per second (1,200 cu ft/s; 34,000 L/s; 9,000 USgal/s)

Basin features
- Tributaries
  - left: 2
  - right: 0

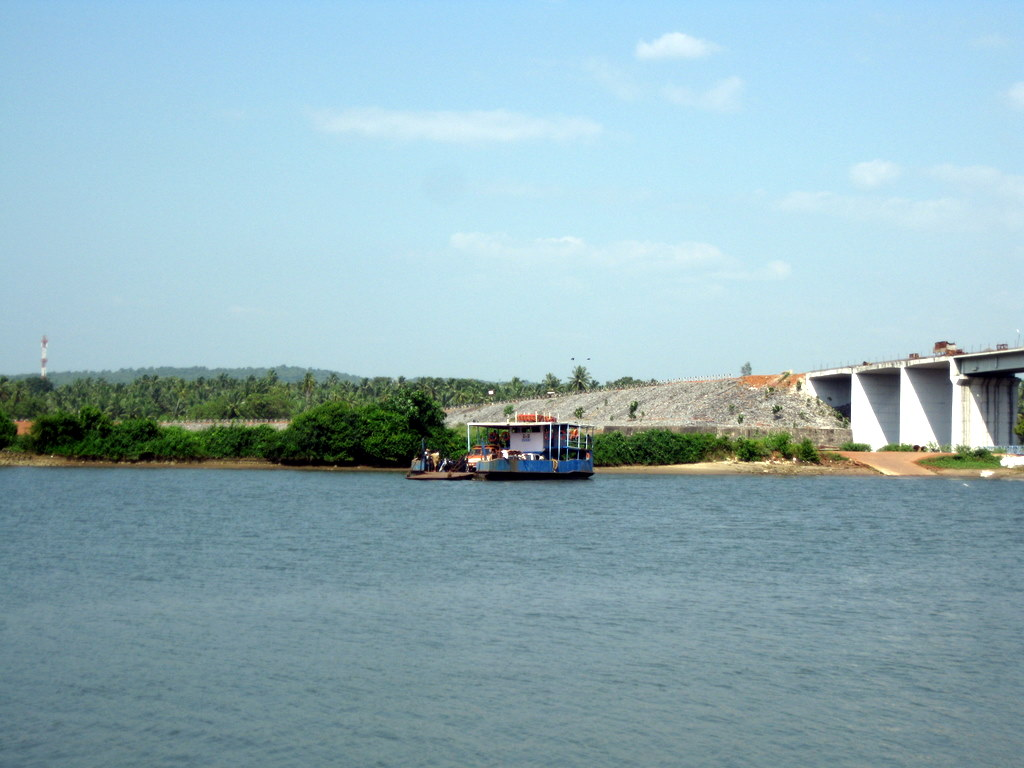
A ferry crossing Tiracol river near Kiranpani, Aronda

The Terekhol or Tiracol River is a river in western India. In its upper reaches it is known as the Banda River and in the lower reaches as the Tiracol. It forms the boundary between Sindhudurg district of Maharashtra state and North Goa district of Goa state for some distance. The Terekhol rises in the environs of the Manohargad in the Western Ghats and flows in a south-westerly direction to meet the Arabian Sea.

The Portuguese era Tiracol Fort is located on the northern mouth of this river which is also in the far north-west of Goa, which has been turned into a heritage hotel now. The fort has been converted into a tourist destination, maintained in excellent condition. From Querim, you can cross the Tiracol River by ferry and then it is 2 km to the fort.
