= Arambol =

Village in Goa, India

- Village
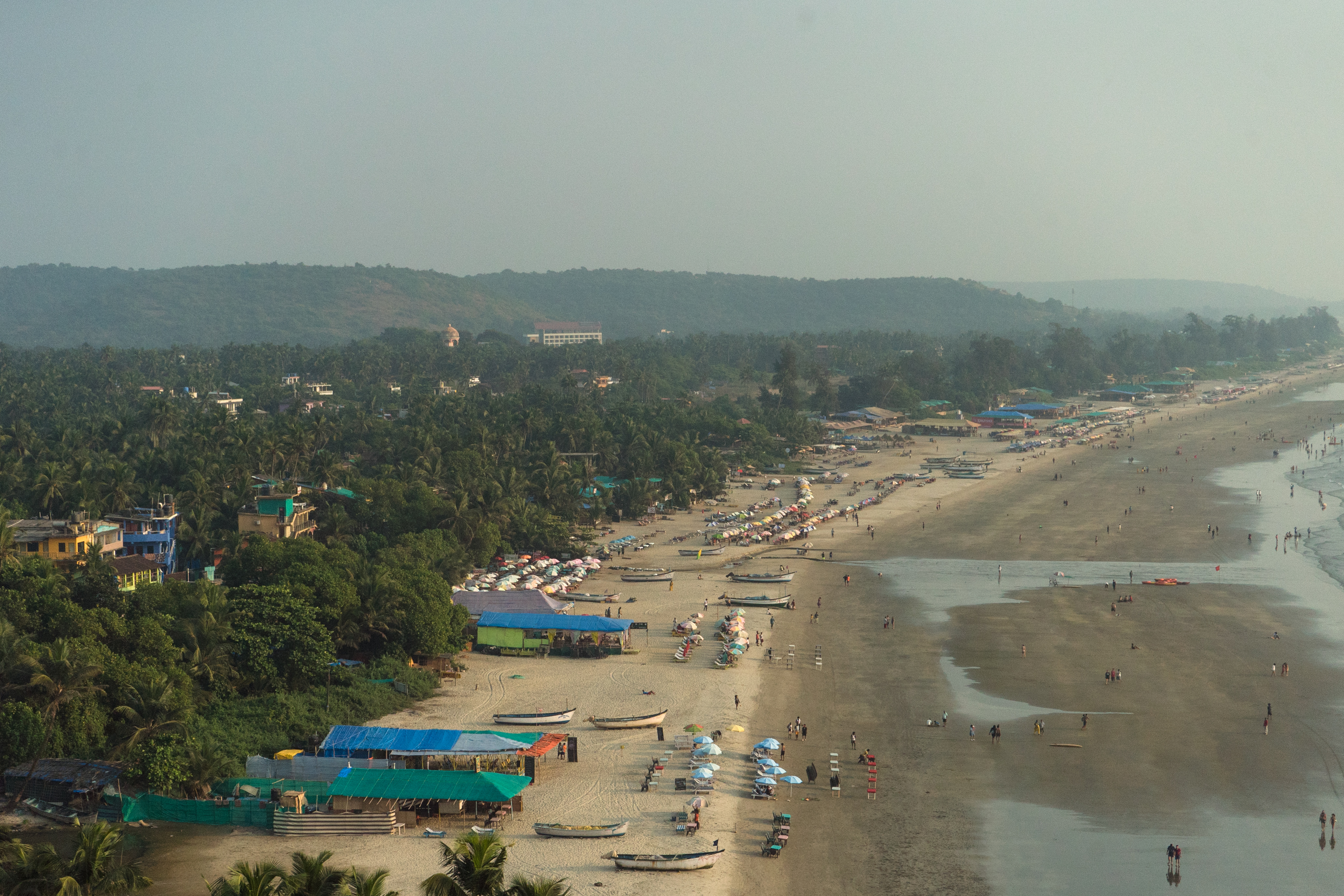
- Aerial view of Arambol beach

- Location within Goa
- Coordinates: 15°42′N 73°42′E

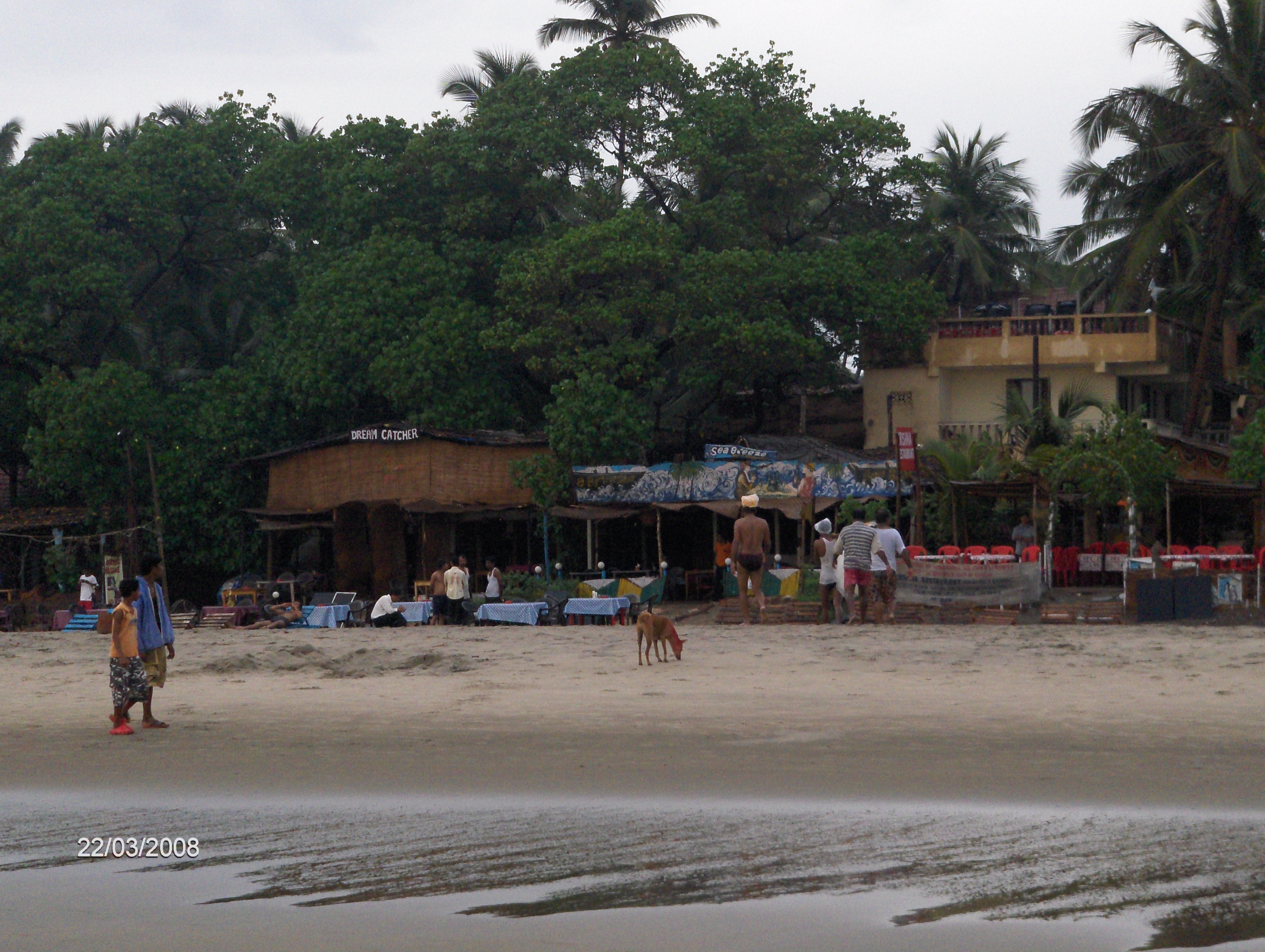
Beach Shacks in Arambol

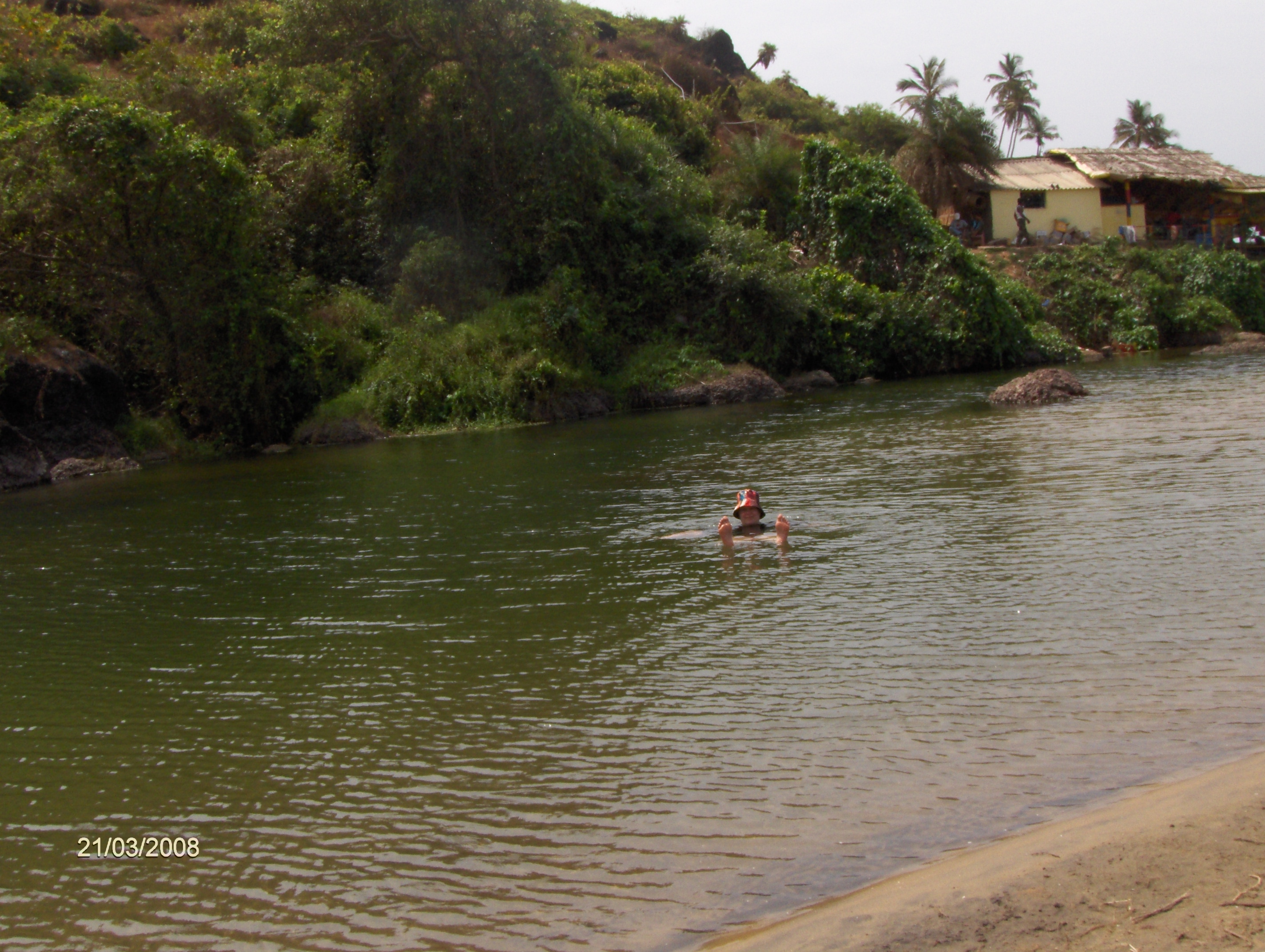
Sweet Water Lake in Arambol

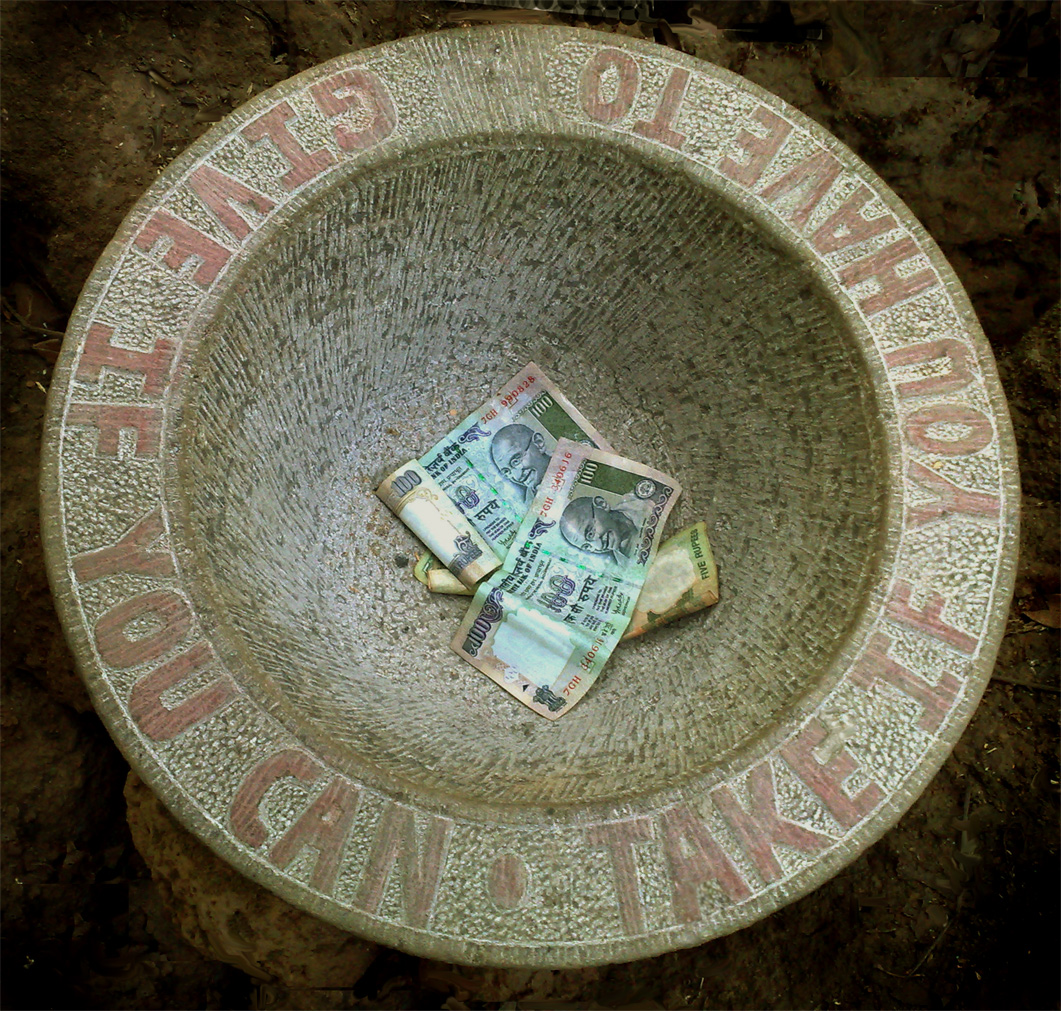
The "money stone" sculpture at the banyan tree

Arambol is a traditional fisherman village in the Pernem administrative region of North Goa, India, located 24.6 km (15.3 mi) north of Goa's capital city of Panaji. As of 2011, it has a population of around 5,300.

Its beach, bordering Keri Beach to the north and Mandrem Beach to the south, attracts many international tourists, mainly during the winter season between November and March.

== Weather ==
- Rainfall: 3,117 mm (122.7 in)
- Maximum temperature: 34 °C (93 °F)
- Minimum temperature: 23 °C (73 °F)

Arambol's warmest month of the year is usually April, with an average high of 34 °C (93 °F). The sunniest months are January, February, April, May, and December, with around 10 hours of sunshine per day. The dry period in Arambol corresponds with its main tourist season, from December to April. The warmest sea temperature is between April and June, with an average high of 29 °C (84 °F).

== Utilities and services ==
=== Sanitation and drinking water ===
The village has an open drainage system. Water is supplied from a service reservoir. The town gets it water as tap water from a treated source. The capacity of the water supply system is 650 kl (23,000 cu ft). The nearest fire fighting service is at Pernem – 13 km (8.1 mi) away.

=== Market ===
Every Wednesday, a weekly market takes place at the Arambol Bus Stand area, where local vegetable vendors sell their products.

== Religion ==
The majority of the residents are Hindu. Christian and Muslim minorities are also present. The Church of Our Lady of Mount Carmel serves the religious interests of the many Catholics in the area.

== Notable sites ==
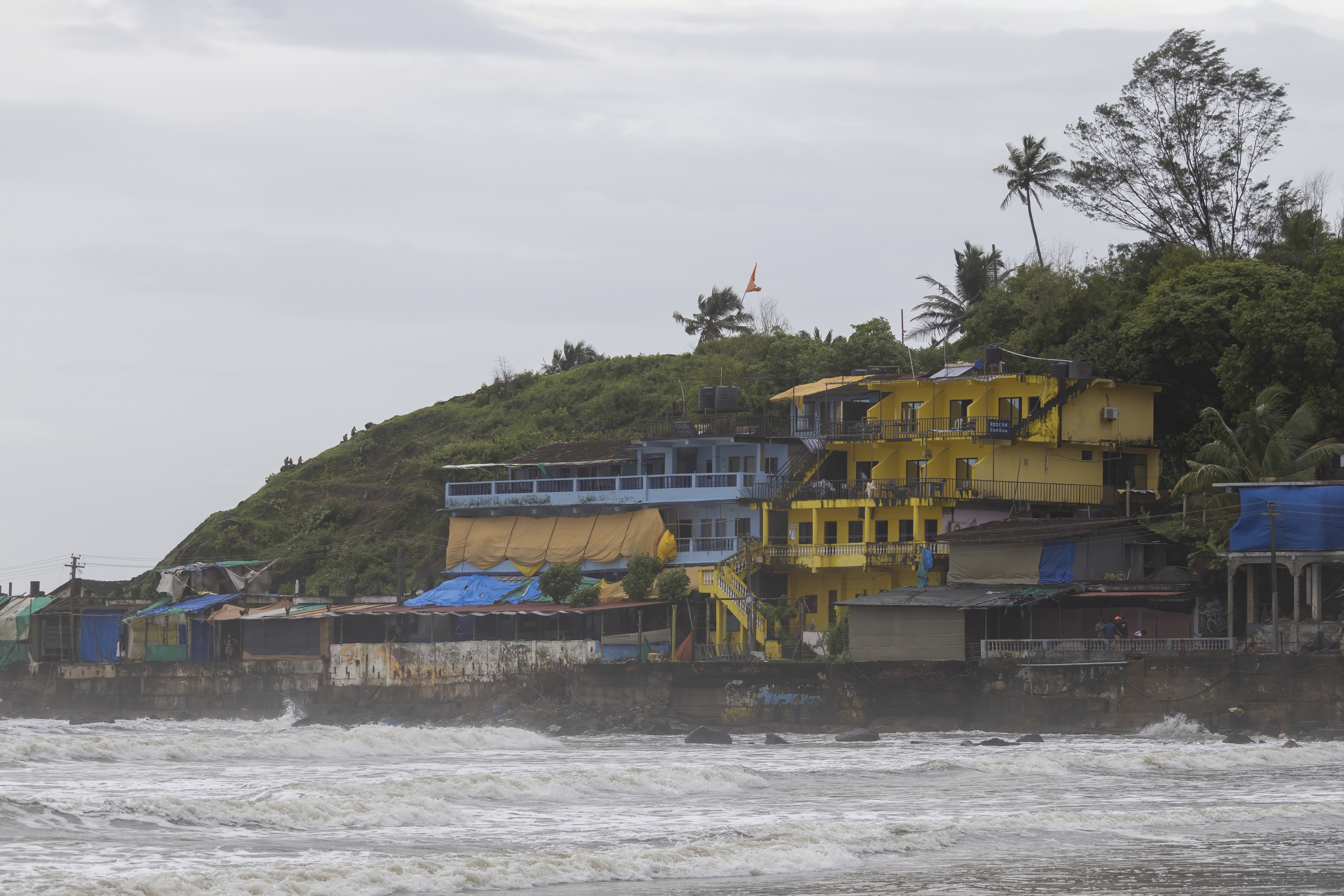
Houses along Arambol mountain

In the jungle valley there is a stone sculpture created by a Polish artist, Jacek Tylicki, titled Give if you can - Take if you have to (also called The Money Stone). It has become a pilgrimage destination.

=== Activities ===
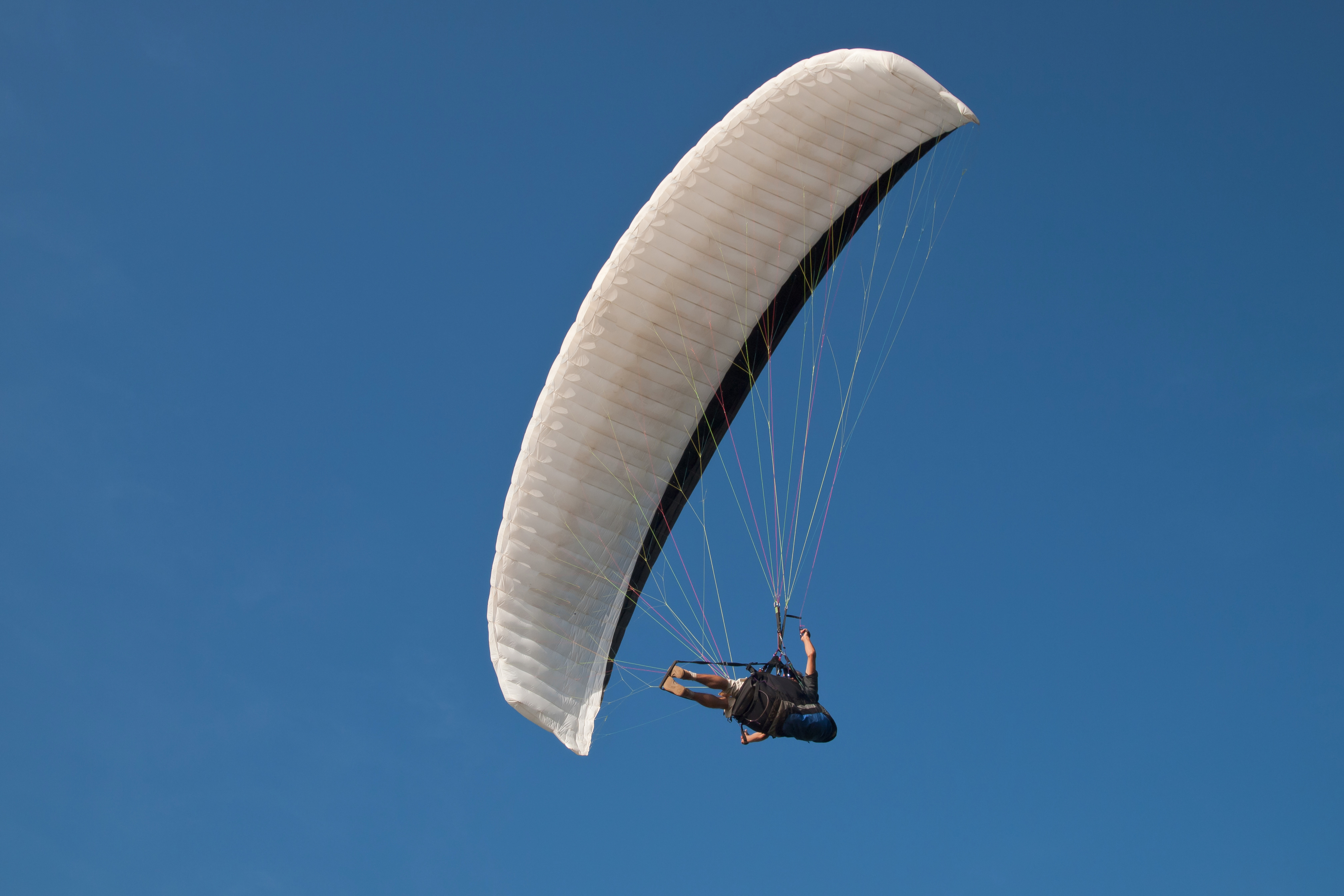
Paragliding in Arambol

Strong winds during the main season make it a significant location for leisure sports, like paragliding and kite surfing.

=== Events ===
The Tribal Dance Festival and the Indian Juggling Convention take place in Arambol. The Goa Contact Festival and In-Touch Festival both offer Contact Improvisation Dance and Somatics. All are scheduled for late January/early February.

== Harmal Chilli ==
The Harmal chilli is a variety of chilli mainly grown in this village and so named after its place of origin.

Noted for its high pungency, even a small quantity of Harmal chilli powder is sufficient to add significant flavor to dishes. Due to its intense heat, it is often blended with other spices (masalas) to create iconic Goan culinary preparations like Chicken Xacuti Masala, Garam Masala, Khatkhatem, Recheado Masala.

=== Geographical indication ===
It was awarded the Geographical Indication (GI) status tag from the Geographical Indications Registry under the Union Government of India on 14 September 2021 (valid until 13 January 2029).

The Harmal-Pernem Chilli (Mirchi) Growers Association from Pernem, proposed the GI registration of Harmal Chilli. After filing the application in May 2020, the chilli was granted the GI tag in 2021 by the Geographical Indication Registry in Chennai, making the name "Harmal Chilli" exclusive to the chilies grown in the region. It thus became the second chilli variety from Goa after Khola Chilli and the 3rd type of goods from Goa to earn the GI tag.
