= Parcem =

- Census town
- Location in Goa, India Parcem (India)
- Coordinates: 15.67°N 73.77°E
- Country: India
- State: Goa
- District: North Goa
- Elevation: 19 m (62 ft)

Population (2001)
  - Total: 4,320

Languages
  - Official: Konkani
- Time zone: UTC+5:30 (IST)
- Postal code: 403512
- Telephone code: 0832
- Vehicle registration: GA 11
- Website: goa.gov.in

Parcem is a census town in North Goa district in the Indian state of Goa.

== Geography ==
Parcem is located at . It has an average elevation of 19 metres (62 feet).

== Demographics ==
As of 2001 India census, Parcem had a population of 4320. Males constitute 51% of the population and females 49%. Parcem has an average literacy rate of 74%, higher than the national average of 59.5%: male literacy is 81%, and female literacy is 66%. In Parcem, 10% of the population is under 6 years of age.
