= Indian peers and baronets =

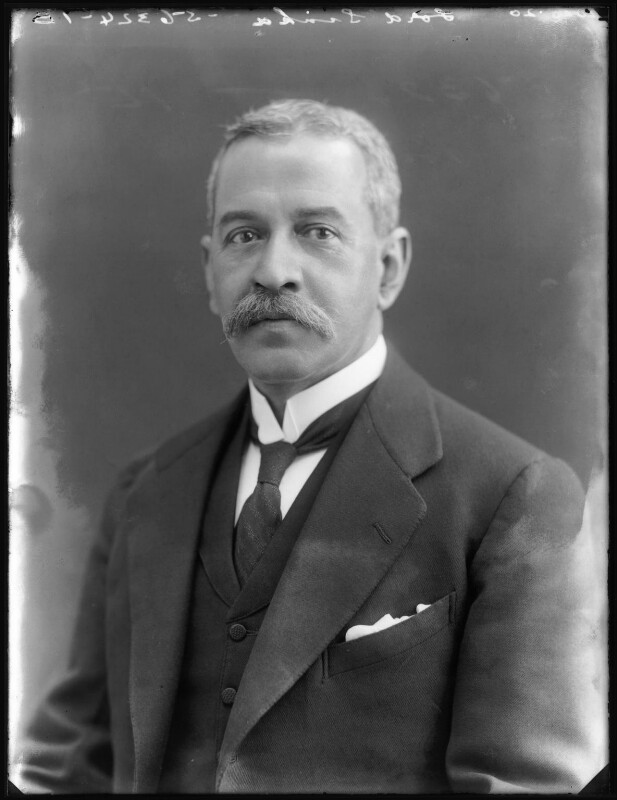
Satyendra Prasanna Sinha, 1st Baron Sinha

Following the final collapse of the Mughal Dynasty in 1857 and the proclamation of the British Raj, the new dynasty continued to maintain and recognise many of the old Mughal and Hindu styles and titles, introducing a compound honours system which awarded those titles along with British noble and aristocratic titles and knighthoods. Uniquely, the Indian subcontinent was the only possession of the Crown where British hereditary titles were conferred upon British subjects not of European ancestry. All British titles and honours became obsolete after the formation of the modern Republic of India in 1950, though they continue to be recognised by the British government.

== List of Indian peers and baronets ==
The following is a list of all peerages and baronetcies conferred upon Indians as part of the British honours system during the era of the British Indian Empire:

=== Indian peerages ===
The peerage is a hereditary British title representing the highest tier of the British nobility. Only one British Indian, Sir Satyendra Prasanna Sinha, was ever elevated to this distinguished rank and which is extant.

==== Extant ====
- Baron Sinha. The Barony of Sinha, of Raipur in the Presidency of Bengal, is a title in the Peerage of the United Kingdom that was created in 1919 for Sir Satyendra Prasanna Sinha, and the only British hereditary peerage ever created for a person of Indian origin. The son of a zamindar, Sinha was a successful London-educated barrister who in 1908 became the first Indian to be appointed as Advocate-General of Bengal, and became the first Indian member of the Governor-General's Executive Council in 1909. He represented India at the Versailles Peace Conference in 1919. Knighted in the 1915 New Year Honours, he became the first Indian Parliamentary Under-Secretary of State for India in 1919. Lord Sinha also became a member of the Imperial Privy Council. He became the first Indian Governor of Bihar and Odisha in 1920, the first Indian to be appointed a provincial governor by the British; however, he retired on health grounds in 1921 and died in 1928. The peerage title is currently held by his great-grandson, Arup Kumar Sinha, the 6th Baron Sinha (born 1966), though he is currently not officially registered with the British College of Arms.

=== Indian baronets ===
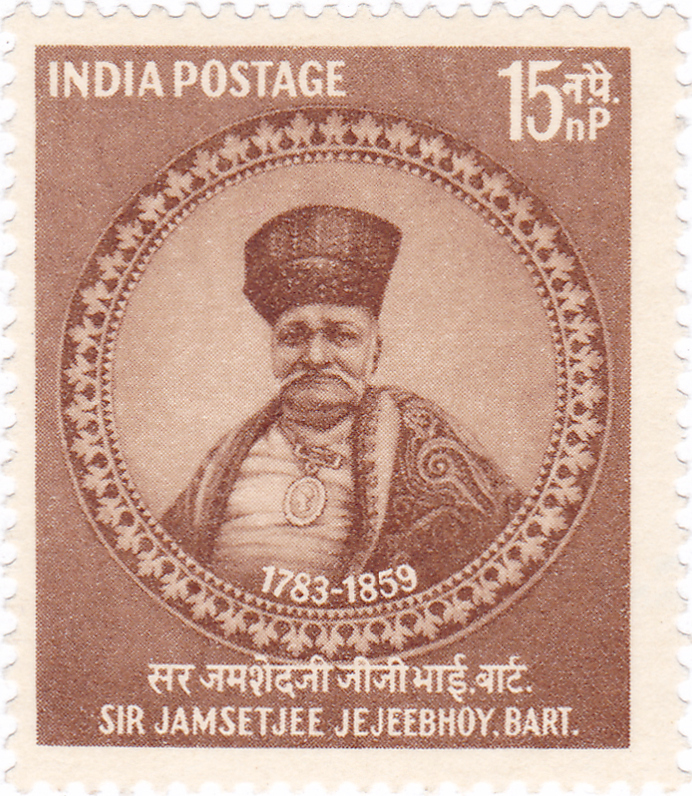
Sir Jamsetjee Jeejeebhoy, one of the most famous industrialists in Indian history

A baronetcy is a British hereditary title which was granted to several Indians, all of whom were merchants, for their services to trade and commerce.

==== Extant ====
- Jejeebhoy baronetcy, of Bombay. Created in 1857 for Sir Jamsetjee Jejeebhoy, a noted Parsi business magnate and philanthropist from Bombay (Mumbai). The first Indian to be knighted, in 1842, he was known for his immense wealth and charitable works. Under a special act, all successive heirs to the baronetcy adopt the first baronet's full name as their own. The title is currently held by Sir Jamsetjee Jejeebhoy, 8th Baronet.
- Petit baronetcy, of Petit Hall of Bombay. Created in 1890 for Sir Dinshaw Maneckji Petit, a Parsi textiles merchant and entrepreneur. Under a special act, all successive heirs to the baronetcy adopt the first baronet's full name as their own. The title is currently held by Sir Dinshaw Maneckji Petit, 5th Baronet.
- Jehangir baronetcy, of Bombay. Created in 1908 for Sir Jehangir Cowasji Jehangir Readymoney, a prominent Parsi industrialist. Under a special act, all successive heirs to the baronetcy adopt the first baronet's full name as their own. The title is currently held by Sir Cowasji Jehangir, 4th Baronet.
- Ebrahim baronetcy, of Pabaney Villa of Bombay. Created in 1910 for Sir Currimbhoy Ebrahim, a prominent Gujarati Ismaili Muslim businessman and China trader, and the first Muslim to be granted a British hereditary title. Under a special act, all successive heirs of the first baronet adopt the first baronet's full name as their own. The title is currently held by Sir Currimbhoy Ebrahim, 4th Baronet.
- Ranchhodlal baronetcy, of Shahpur in Ahmedabad. Created in 1913 for Sir Chinubhai Madhowlal Ranchhodlal, 1st Baronet, a Gujarati Hindu textile merchant and the first Hindu to be granted a British hereditary title. The title is currently held by Sir (Prashant) Chinubhai Madhowlal Ranchhodlal, 4th Baronet.

==== Extinct ====
- Sassoon baronetcy, of Kensington Gore. Created in 1890 for Sir Albert Abdullah David Sassoon, a Baghdadi Jewish banker, merchant, philanthropist and member of the noted Sassoon family, who emigrated with his family from Baghdad to India in 1832. The title became extinct with the death of his grandson, the third baronet, in 1939.
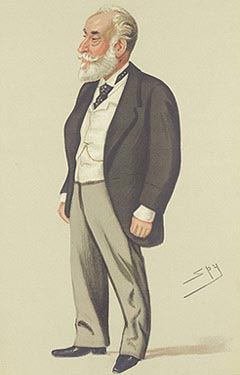
  Sir Albert Sassoon
- Sassoon baronetcy, of Bombay. Created in 1909 for Sir Jacob Elias Sassoon (1843 – 22 October 1916), the elder son of Elias David Sassoon and a nephew of Sir Albert Abdullah David Sassoon. He had no children and was succeeded under a special remainder in the letters patent by his younger brother Edward. He was succeeded by Sir E. V. Sassoon. At his death in Bermuda in 1961 the baronetcy became extinct.

== See also ==
- List of peers and fidalgos in Portuguese India
