= Mandrem =

Village in Goa, India

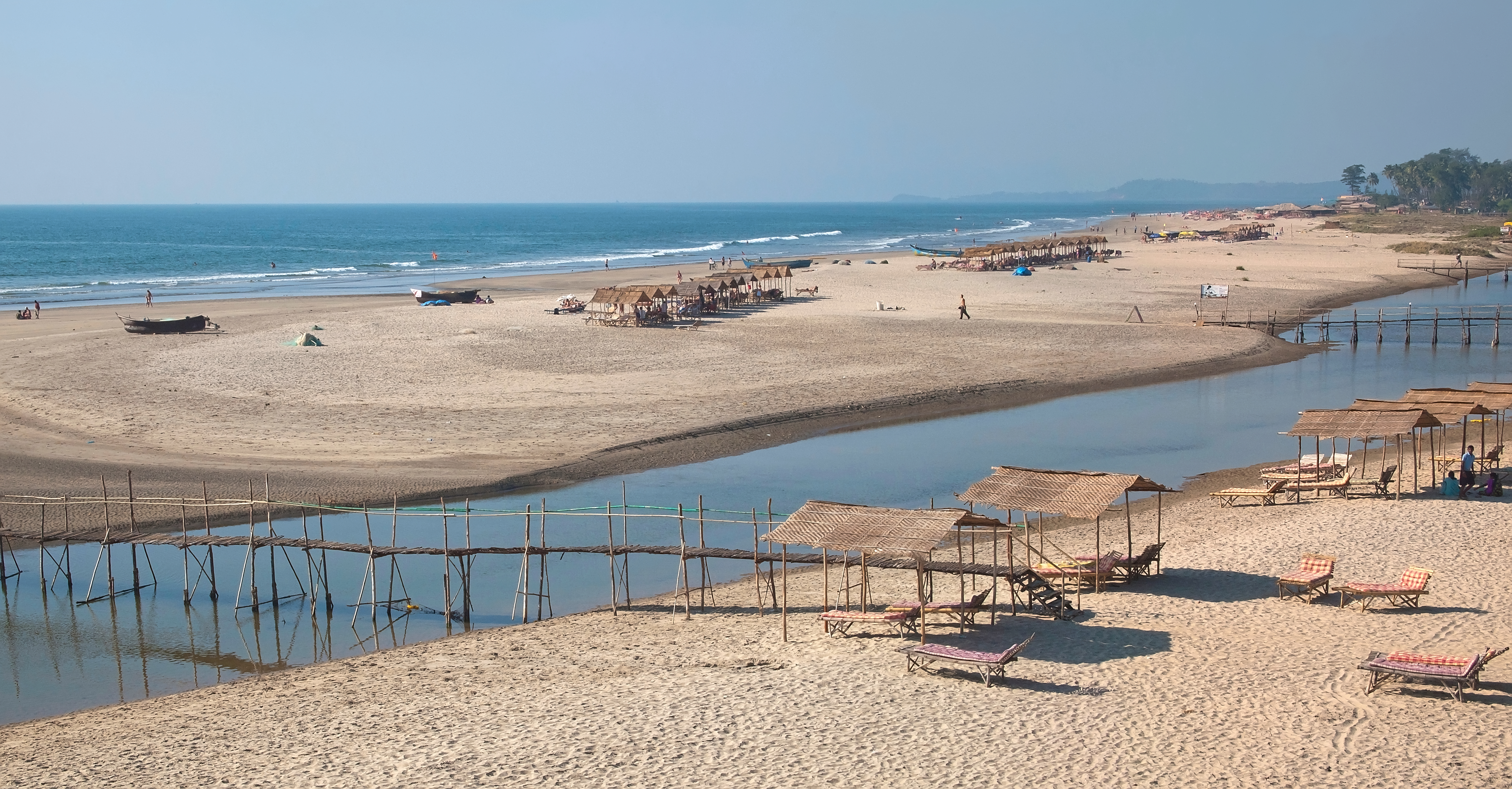
- Mandrem Beach and river

- Location in Goa, India Mandrem (India)
- Coordinates: 15.658123°N 73.713062°E
- Country: India
- State: Goa
- District: North Goa

Area
  - Total: 18.9 km^{2} (7.3 sq mi)

Population (2011)
  - Total: 8,336
  - Density: 441/km^{2} (1,140/sq mi)

Languages
  - Official: Konkani
- Time zone: UTC+5:30 (IST)
- PIN: 403527
- Vehicle registration: GA
- Website: goa.gov.in

Mandrem is a coastal village famous as a tourist spot in Pernem taluka in North Goa district of Goa state in India. It is 21 km from the capital Panaji.

== About ==
It has two main beaches: Junas and Ashvem.

The village has 11 wards.

Mandrem or Mandre, originally named as Manjrey, was converted to Mandrem by the Portuguese. The "D" is pronounced as "J" in Portuguese.

== Mandrem beach ==
Mandrem Beach is a white sand beach with clear water. The beach of Mandrem lies between the twin beaches of Morjim and Arambol. This beach is a quiet and peaceful beach. The beauty of Mandrem Beach is especially during the High Tide time when the seawater rushes into the Mandrem Creek or River. This Mandrem creek moves parallel to the waterline. Mandrem has a small fishing community and occasionally one might see local fishermen hauling their catch from the sea. The beach has been notified as a turtle nesting site under CRZ 2011.

== Government and politics ==
Mandrem is part of Mandrem (Goa Assembly constituency) and North Goa (Lok Sabha constituency).

== Notable residents ==
- Bhau Daji Lad – Sanskrit scholar, physician and antique collector. Born in Aska vaddo
- Anurag Mhamal – Goa’s first chess international master
