= Fort Tiracol =

Building in India

Coordinates: 15.7306°N 73.682°E

- Fortaleza da Santíssima Trindade
- Part of Goa
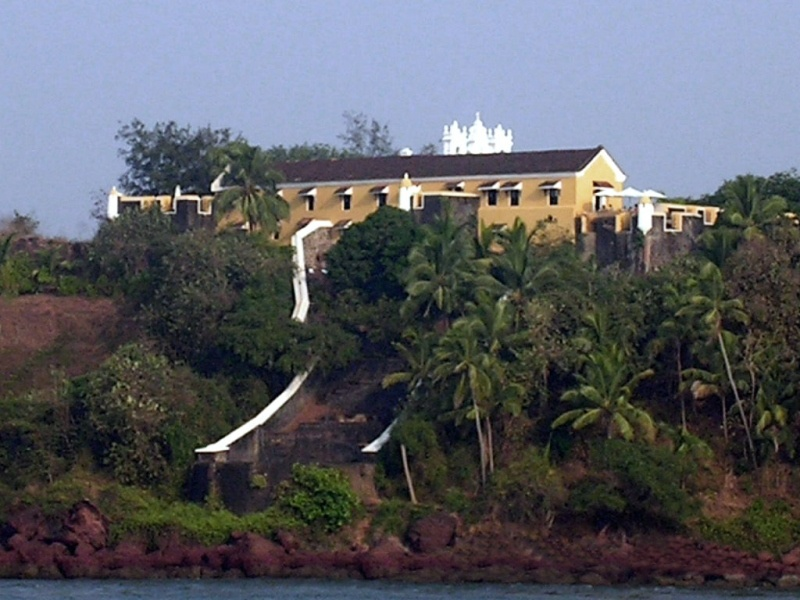

Site information
- Type: Fort and Church
- Controlled by: Government of Goa
- Open to the public: Yes
- Condition: Restored as a luxury hotel. Church still in use.

Site history
- Built: 17th century
- Built by: Raja of Sawantwadi; Viceroy Pedro Miguel de Almeida
- Materials: Granite Stones and lime mortar
- Demolished: n/a
- Battles/wars: 4

Garrison information
- Current commander: none
- Garrison: none
- Occupants: Staff and Parishioners

Fort Santíssima Trindade (Fortaleza da Santíssima Trindade in Portuguese) also known as Fort Tiracol, is a Portuguese era fort near the village of Tiracol, in the North Goa district of Goa, India. At the mouth of the Terekhol River, the fort can be reached by a ferry from Querim, 42 km (26 mi) north of Panaji.

== History ==
It is believed that the fort was originally crudely built by Khem Sawant Bhonsle, the Raja of Sawantwadi, in the 17th century. The site chosen was a hillock on the Northern (right) bank of the river, which gave a commanding view of the Arabian sea. The Bhonsles of Sawantwadi kept a sizeable fleet of navy vessels which sheltered in the Tiracol River. The fort initially consisted of 12 guns, a barrack and a chapel.

In 1746, the Portuguese under the 44th viceroy of Goa, Pedro Miguel de Almeida, waged war against the raja of Sawantwadi, as a retaliation to constant border raids. On 16 November 1746, de Almeida brought the Portuguese fleet up to the river, waged a fierce maritime engagement against the naval forces of the Raja of Sawantwadi in which the Portuguese defeated the Sawantwadi forces utterly. Several skirmishes on land followed and Fort Tiracol was finally surrendered on 23 November 1746 to the Portuguese.

The fort became an important part of Portuguese maritime defences; being extensively revamped in 1764. It remained in Portuguese control till December 1961 when the Portuguese forces in the subcontinent were defeated by India.

On 17 February 1819, following the defeat of the Marathas, a treaty was signed by Raja Bhonsle Khem Sawunt of Sawantwadi who recognised British suzerainty. This treaty effectively abolished the strategic importance of the fort, as it became an enclave in territory controlled by British allies.

During the Portuguese Civil War, the fort served as a rebel stronghold during an uprising in 1825 against the Portuguese led by Dr. Bernardo Peres da Silva, the first Goan-born viceroy of Goa. It was greatly damaged but the fort and the chapel were later rebuilt. A ruthless Commandant, "Tiger-killer" da Cunha entered the fort and ordered the beheading of the entire garrison and the placing of the heads on stakes.

Fort Tiracol was a symbolic location where freedom fighters from Goa demonstrated from time to time. On 15 August 1954, Satyagrahis protesting Portuguese rule entered Goa from three different directions - one of which was from the North to Fort Tiracol, which was occupied and flew the Indian flag for a day before they were captured and imprisoned.

Now, Fort Tiracol has been converted into a hotel, called the Fort Tiracol Heritage.

== Igreja de Santo António ==
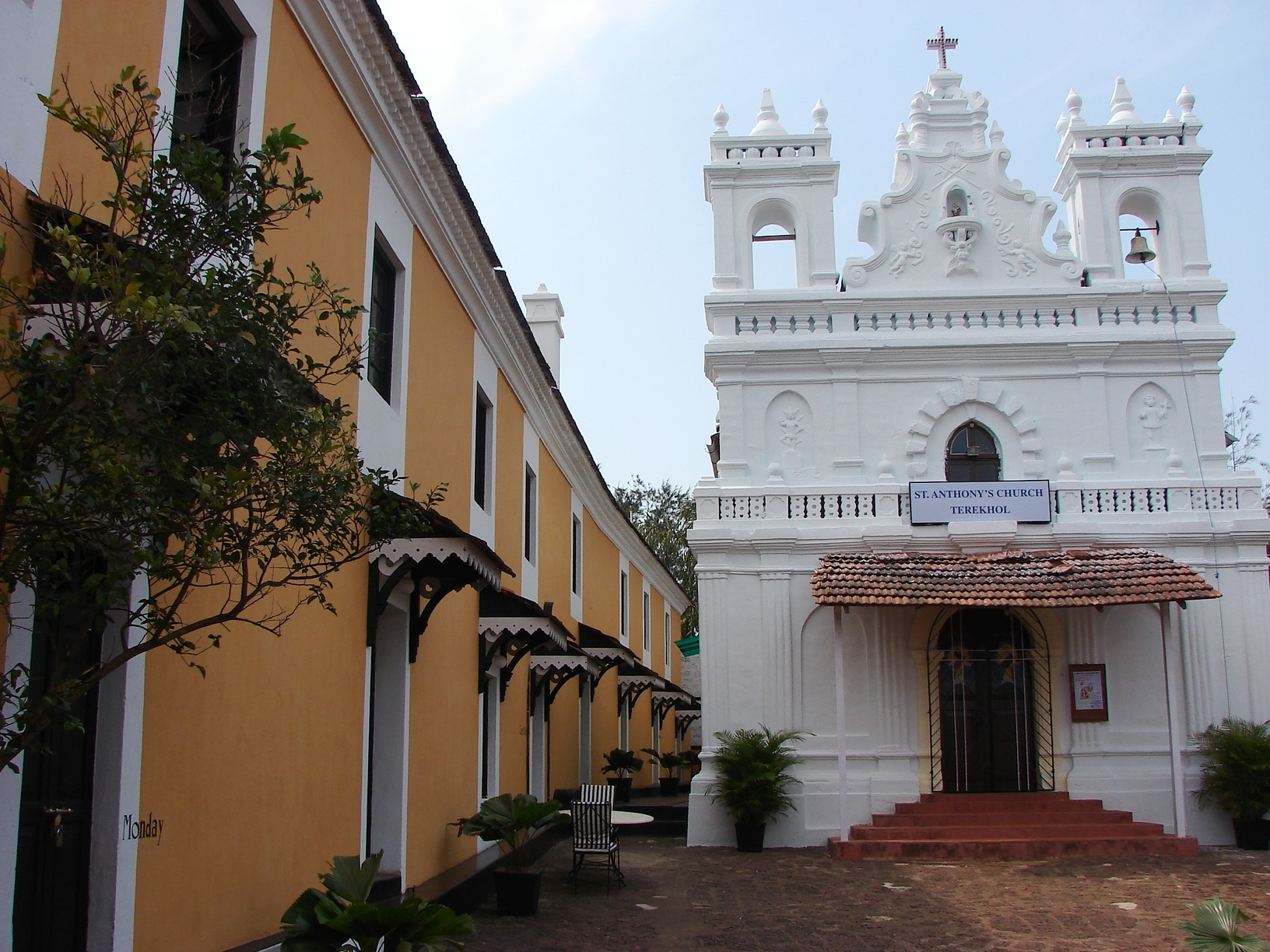
Tiracol Church.

A Chapel for the Holy Trinity was constructed in the fort courtyard by de Almeida after its capture. This later became the century-old Church of St. Anthony. Mass is held every Sunday at 9:00 am. The church is not open to the general public at other times, except on certain occasions, such as the annual feast that is usually held in May.

== See also ==
- Siege of Tiracol
