= North Goa district =

- District
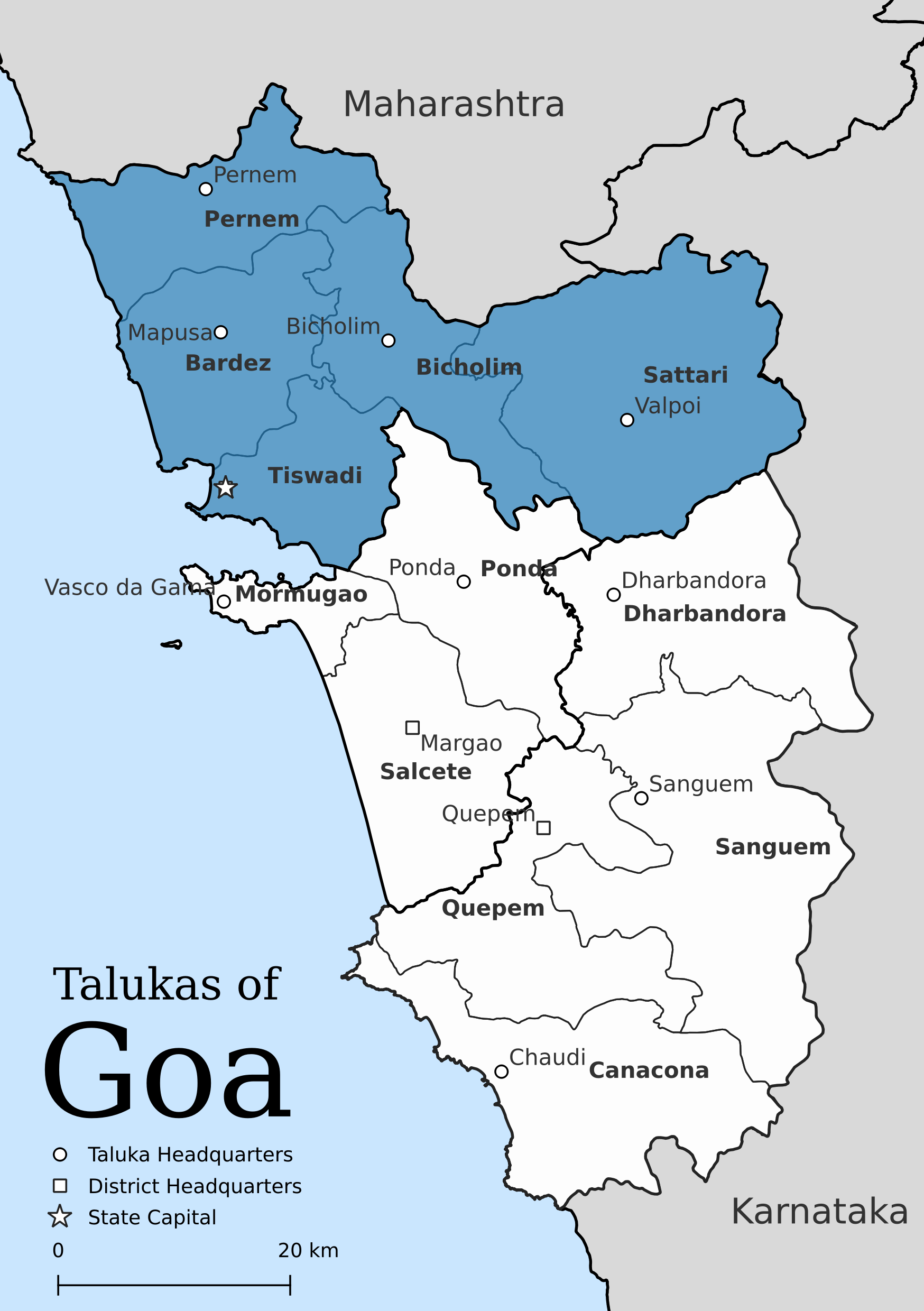
- North Goa district in Goa state
- Country: India
- State: Goa
- Headquarters: Panaji
- Taluka: 1. Tiswadi; 2. Bardez; 3. Pernem; 4. Bicholim; 5. Sattari

Government
  - District collector: Dr. Sneha Gitte, I.A.S.
  - Superintendent of Police: Akshat Kaushal, IPS
  - Lok Sabha constituencies: North Goa
  - Member of Parliament, Lok Sabha: Shripad Naik (BJP)
  - Zilla Parishad, Chairperson: Siddesh Naik

Area
  - Total: 1,736 km^{2} (670 sq mi)
  - Rank: 2nd
- Highest elevation (Sonsogor): 1,166 m (3,825 ft)

Population (2011)
  - Total: 818,008
  - Rank: 1st
  - Density: 471.2/km^{2} (1,220/sq mi)
  - Urban: 60.28%

Demography
  - Language: Konkani

Human Development
  - Literacy: 89.57
  - Sex ratio: 963
- Time zone: UTC+05:30 (IST)
- PIN: 4030xx, 4031xx, 4032xx, 4034xx, 4035xx (North Goa)
- Telephone: +91 0832
- Vehicle registration: GA-01
- Climate: Am (Köppen)
- Largest city: Panaji (21.01 km^{2} (8.11 sq mi))
- Largest city (by population): Mapusa
- Average annual precipitation: 320 cm (3,200 mm) (June–September)
- Website: northgoa.gov.in

North Goa district is one of the three districts that constitutes the state of Goa, India. The district has an area of 1,736 square kilometres (670 square miles), and is bounded by Kolhapur and Sindhudurg districts of Maharashtra state to the north and by Belagavi district of Karnataka to the east, by South Goa district to the south, and by the Arabian Sea to the west.

== Historical background ==
At the advent of the Portuguese in AD 1510, all of today's northern territories (Ilhas, Bardez, Pernem, Bicholim, Antruz, and Sattari) were part of the Bijapur Sultanate. Conflicts between the Adil Shahi dynasty and the Portuguese soon followed. Ilhas and Bardez were annexed by the Portuguese after their successful conquest and the region is now called Velhas Conquistas (Old Conquests). After the fall of the Deccan sultanates and rise of the Marathas in the late 1600s, the remaining region eventually fell under the control of the Maratha Kingdom of Sawantwadi until AD 1783. These territories were seen as safe haven for the Hindus, Muslims and new-Christians who fled the Portuguese Inquisition taking place in Goa. These territories were acquired by the Portuguese as part of Novas Conquistas (New Conquest) in the late 18th century. They remained with the Portuguese until 1961 when they were annexed by India.

Goa and two other former Portuguese enclaves became the union territory of Goa, Daman, and Diu, and Goa was organized into a single district in 1965. On 30 May 1987, Goa attained statehood (while Daman and Diu remained a union territory), and Goa was reorganized into two districts, North Goa and South Goa.

=== Portuguese in Goa (1510–1961) ===
==== Advent of Portuguese (1498) ====
Lured by the thrill of discovery and goaded by the prospect of seeking Christians and spices Portugal embarked on perilous voyages to the Orient which culminated in Bartholomew Dias’ trip around the Cape of Good Hope. This spectacular breakthrough opened new vistas. A decade later Vasco Da Gama set off eastwards and in AD 1498 landed in Calicut and broke the Arab monopoly of trade.

==== Estado Da India (1510) ====
Fired with the dream of establishing an Eastern Empire for Portugal, Afonso De Albuquerque, Governor-General of Goa, set to acquire strategic centers also the trade route. At the invitation of the Admiral of the Vijayanagar's fleet, he occupied Goa with little initial opposition. Though temporarily routed, he triumphantly regained possession of the city on 25 November 1510, and kneeling in the public square he dedicated Goa to St. Catherine whose feast was on that day.

In 1530 Goa became the capital of the Portuguese Empire in the East and mistress of the sea from the Cape of Good Hope to the China Sea.

==== Saint Francis Xavier (1542–1552) ====
The arrival in AD 1542 of a young Spanish nobleman turned Jesuit. With a background of academic learning, he made a tremendous impact. His compassion for the weak and the downtrodden, his dynamic zeal and his innate holiness edified many. Two years after his death in AD 1552, the incorrupt body of the saint was enshrined in Goa. It has continued to attract pilgrims from all over the world even to this day.

==== India's first printing press (1556) ====
The first printing press of moveable types in the whole of India printed Doutrina Christa written by Francis Xavier & Garcia de Orta called Colloquios Dos Simples Drogos Medicinais and an early work of the poet Luis De Camoes entitled Os Disparates Da India.

=== Indian Incersions (1946–1961) ===
==== Jai Hind Movement (1946) ====
To intensify the flickering torch of freedom, the Indian Socialist leader, Dr. Ram Manohar Lohia, courted arrest on 18 June 1946 by defiantly addressing a mammoth meeting in Goa.

In August 1946, at Londa on the border, a mass meeting of Goan nationalist workers charted out a plan of non-violent action. To express the peoples's longing for freedom, satyagrahas were launched until the year ended in different parts of the Portuguese enclaves and resulted in 1500 Goans being imprisoned and the ring leaders deported.

==== Goa Action Committee (1953) ====
After the French withdrawal from India, a futile attempt was made by the Government of India to negotiate with Portugal for a peaceful transfer of its possession to the Indian Union. Consequently, the Goa Action Committee was formed in Bombay to awaken sympathy for its cause within the country and abroad.

==== Operation Vijaya (1961) ====
In 1958 all parties amalgamated under the banner of Goan Political Convention presided over by Professor Aloysius Soares.

Through action by Armed forces, the Government of India entered Goa. Scant resistance was offered and in December 1961 with hardly any bloodshed, Goa was liberated from the Portuguese.

== Geography ==
Its geographical position is marked by 15° 48′ 00″ N to 14° 53′ 54″ N latitudes and 73° E to 75° E longitudes

=== Climate ===
Climate data for Panaji (1971–1990)
Month	Jan	Feb	Mar	Apr	May	Jun	Jul	Aug	Sep	Oct	Nov	Dec	Year
Record high °C (°F)	36.6 (97.9)	39.2 (102.6)	39.0 (102.2)	39.8 (103.6)	38.6 (101.5)	35.9 (96.6)	32.3 (90.1)	34.0 (93.2)	33.2 (91.8)	37.2 (99.0)	37.2 (99.0)	36.6 (97.9)	39.8 (103.6)
Mean daily maximum °C (°F)	32.0 (89.6)	31.7 (89.1)	32.2 (90.0)	33.1 (91.6)	33.4 (92.1)	30.3 (86.5)	29.1 (84.4)	28.7 (83.7)	29.8 (85.6)	31.8 (89.2)	32.9 (91.2)	32.7 (90.9)	31.5 (88.7)
Daily mean °C (°F)	26.0 (78.8)	26.3 (79.3)	27.7 (81.9)	29.3 (84.7)	30.0 (86.0)	27.6 (81.7)	26.7 (80.1)	26.4 (79.5)	26.9 (80.4)	27.9 (82.2)	27.6 (81.7)	26.9 (80.4)	27.4 (81.3)
Mean daily minimum °C (°F)	19.9 (67.8)	20.7 (69.3)	23.2 (73.8)	25.5 (77.9)	26.5 (79.7)	24.8 (76.6)	24.3 (75.7)	24.0 (75.2)	24.0 (75.2)	23.9 (75.0)	22.2 (72.0)	21.0 (69.8)	23.3 (73.9)
Record low °C (°F)	14.4 (57.9)	13.3 (55.9)	17.5 (63.5)	19.4 (66.9)	20.9 (69.6)	20.9 (69.6)	20.5 (68.9)	21.7 (71.1)	21.0 (69.8)	20.0 (68.0)	15.3 (59.5)	15.7 (60.3)	13.3 (55.9)
Average precipitation mm (inches)	0 (0)	0 (0)	1 (0.0)	5 (0.2)	56 (2.2)	861 (33.9)	853 (33.6)	622 (24.5)	237 (9.3)	111 (4.4)	35 (1.4)	2 (0.1)	2,813 (110.7)
Average rainy days (≥ 1.0 mm)	0.0	0.1	0.1	0.6	3.8	24.0	28.2	27.2	14.9	6.6	3.5	0.3	109.3
Average relative humidity (%)	67	69	71	71	71	85	88	89	86	80	70	64	76
Mean monthly sunshine hours	311.8	290.2	291.0	289.0	296.5	125.1	105.7	122.1	177.1	247.7	272.6	299.3	2,828.1
Source 1: NOAA
Source 2: India Meteorological Department (record high and low up to 2010)

== Politics ==
District	No.	Constituency	Name	Party	Alliance	Remarks
North Goa	1	Mandrem	Jit Arolkar	Maharashtrawadi Gomantak Party	NDA	
North Goa	2	Pernem (SC)	Pravin Arlekar	Bharatiya Janata Party	NDA	
North Goa	3	Bicholim	Chandrakant Shetye	Independent	NDA	
North Goa	4	Tivim	Nilkanth Halarnkar	Bharatiya Janata Party	NDA	Cabinet Minister
North Goa	5	Mapusa	Joshua D'Souza	Bharatiya Janata Party	NDA	
North Goa	6	Siolim	Delilah Lobo	Indian National Congress	UPA	Switched from INC to BJP on 14 September 2022
North Goa	6	Siolim	Delilah Lobo	Bharatiya Janata Party	NDA	Switched from INC to BJP on 14 September 2022
North Goa	7	Saligao	Kedar Naik	Indian National Congress	UPA	Switched from INC to BJP on 14 September 2022
North Goa	7	Saligao	Kedar Naik	Bharatiya Janata Party	NDA	Switched from INC to BJP on 14 September 2022
North Goa	8	Calangute	Michael Lobo	Indian National Congress	UPA	Switched from INC to BJP on 14 September 2022
North Goa	8	Calangute	Michael Lobo	Bharatiya Janata Party	NDA	Switched from INC to BJP on 14 September 2022
North Goa	9	Porvorim	Rohan Khaunte	Bharatiya Janata Party	NDA	Cabinet Minister
North Goa	10	Aldona	Carlos Alvares Ferreira	Indian National Congress	UPA	
North Goa	11	Panaji	Atanasio Monserrate	Bharatiya Janata Party	NDA	Cabinet Minister
North Goa	12	Taleigao	Jennifer Monserrate	Bharatiya Janata Party	NDA	
North Goa	13	Santa Cruz	Rodolfo Louis Fernandes	Indian National Congress	UPA	Switched from INC to BJP on 14 September 2022
North Goa	13	Santa Cruz	Rodolfo Louis Fernandes	Bharatiya Janata Party	NDA	Switched from INC to BJP on 14 September 2022
North Goa	14	St. Andre	Viresh Borkar	Revolutionary Goans Party		
North Goa	15	Cumbarjua	Rajesh Faldessai	Indian National Congress	UPA	Switched from INC to BJP on 14 September 2022
North Goa	15	Cumbarjua	Rajesh Faldessai	Bharatiya Janata Party	NDA	Switched from INC to BJP on 14 September 2022
North Goa	16	Maem	Premendra Shet	Bharatiya Janata Party	NDA	
North Goa	17	Sanquelim	Pramod Sawant	Bharatiya Janata Party	NDA	Chief Minister
North Goa	18	Poriem	Deviya Rane	Bharatiya Janata Party	NDA	
North Goa	19	Valpoi	Vishwajit Pratapsingh Rane	Bharatiya Janata Party	NDA	Cabinet Minister
North Goa	20	Priol	Govind Gaude	Bharatiya Janata Party	NDA	
North Goa	21	Ponda	Ravi Naik	Bharatiya Janata Party	NDA	Cabinet Minister
North Goa	22	Siroda	Subhash Shirodkar	Bharatiya Janata Party	NDA	Cabinet Minister
North Goa	23	Marcaim	Sudin Dhavalikar	Maharashtrawadi Gomantak Party	NDA	Cabinet Minister

== Administration ==
The administrative headquarters of the district is Panaji, which is also the capital of the state of Goa. The district forms part of a greater region called the Konkan. Ms Mamu Hage, IAS, is the District Collector.

The district is divided into three subdivisions— Panaji, Mapusa, and Bicholim; and five talukas—Tiswadi (Panaji), Bardez (Mapusa), Pernem, Bicholim, and Sattari (Valpoi).

Each subdivision is headed by a Deputy Collector & Sub Divisional Officer, and each talukas under a Mamlatdar. Each talukas again subdivided into revenue villages, headed by talathis.

Ponda taluka was transferred from North Goa district to South Goa district in January 2015.

=== Zilla Parishad ===
North Goa Zilla Panchayat is an elected body at district level, who look after the rural governance of the district, headed by a President/Chairperson.

== Demographics ==
Historical population
Year	Pop.	±% p.a.
1900	294,074	—
1910	306,323	+0.41%
1920	288,039	−0.61%
1930	313,614	+0.85%
1940	336,628	+0.71%
1950	330,874	−0.17%
1960	349,667	+0.55%
1971	458,312	+2.49%
1981	568,021	+2.17%
1991	664,804	+1.59%
2001	758,573	+1.33%
2011	818,008	+0.76%

=== Population ===
According to the 2011 census North Goa has a population of 818,008 which is roughly equal to the nation of Comoros or the US state of South Dakota. This gives it a ranking of 480th in India (out of a total of 640). The district has a population density of 471 inhabitants per square kilometre (1,220/sq mi). Its population growth rate over the decade 2001–2011 was 7.8%. North Goa has a sex ratio of 959 females for every 1000 males, and a literacy rate of 88.85%. The Scheduled Castes and Scheduled Tribes make up 2.15% and 6.92% of the population of the district.

=== Language ===
Languages of North Goa district (2011)
1. Konkani (65.9%)
2. Marathi (14.4%)
3. Hindi (8.65%)
4. Kannada (3.62%)
5. Urdu (2.89%)
6. Portuguese (0.92%)
7. Others (3.70%)

Konkani is the mother tongue of a majority of the people living in North Goa district. Portuguese is also spoken and understood by a small number of people.

At the time of the 2011 Census of India, 65.86% of the population in the district spoke Konkani, 14.36% Marathi, 8.65% Hindi, 3.62% Kannada, 2.39% Urdu, 0.92 Portuguese, 0.86 English, 0.80 Malayalam, 0.68% Telugu, 0.47% Tamil, 0.46% Gujarati and 0.43% Bengali as their first language.

=== Religion ===
Religion in North Goa district
Religion	Percent
Hinduism	74.0%
Christianity	18.4%
Islam	6.9%
Others	0.7%

Taluka	Hindu	Christian	Others
Pernem	67,330	7,735	682
Bardez	158,405	60,784	18,251
Tiswadi	110,760	49,149	17,310
Bicholim	89,069	1,687	7,199
Satari	57,944	804	5,069

Hinduism (74%) is followed by the majority of population of North Goa. Christians (18.4%) form a significant minority.

== Tourism ==
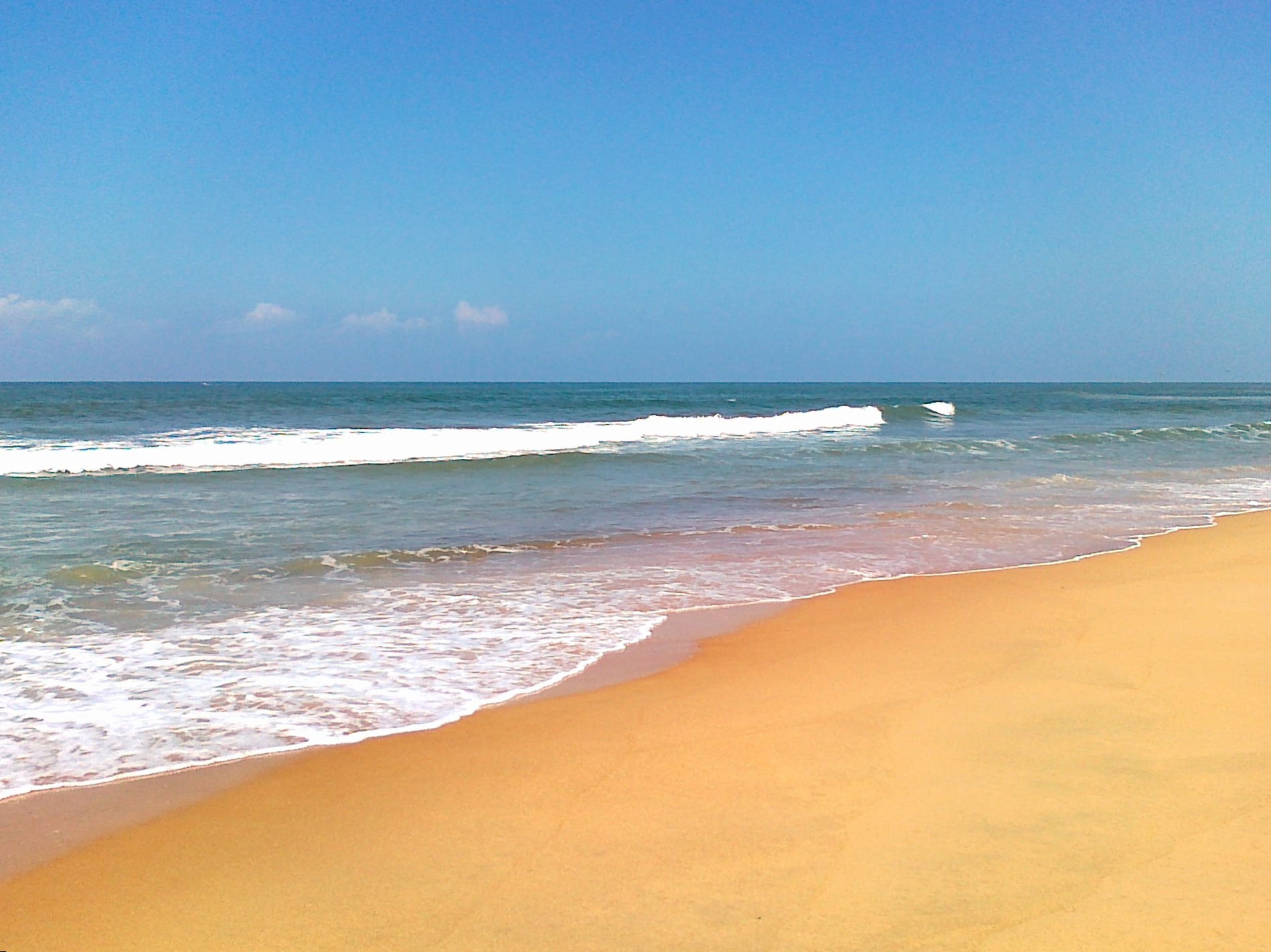
Candolim Beach Goa

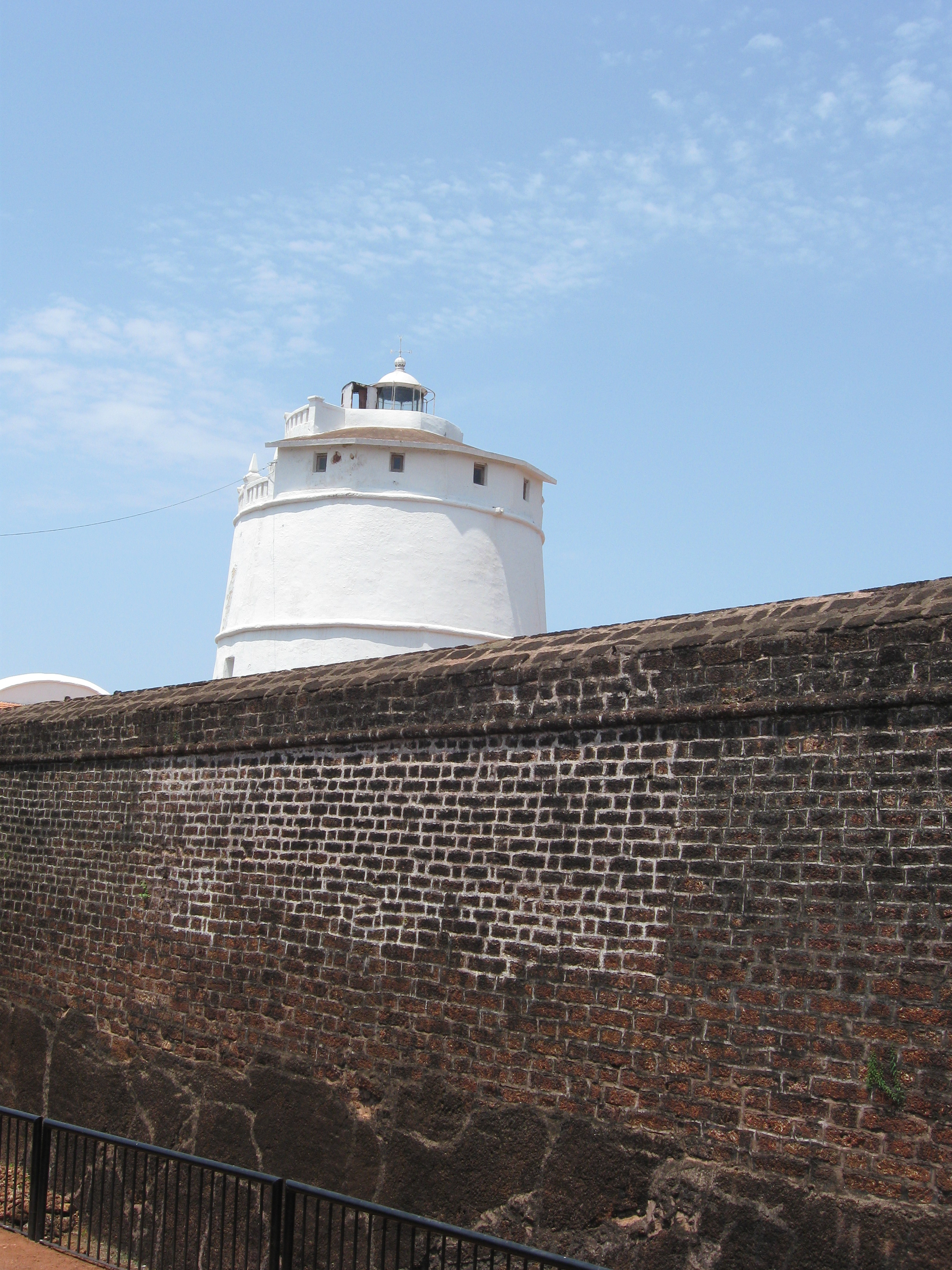
Fort Aguada Light House

North Goa is known for its beaches, which include Anjuna Beach, Candolim Beach, Mandrem Beach, Calangute Beach, Morjim Beach, and Arambol Beach. Other tourist sites include Fort Aguada, the church of Mae De Deus, the temple of Boghdeshwara, and the Hanuman Natya Graha theatre centre. Chorao, Divar Island are islands of North Goa which are accessible via a ferry crossing.
