= Maratha–Portuguese War (1683–1684) =

Campaign against Goa and Bombay of Portuguese India

Maratha–Portuguese War 1683–1684
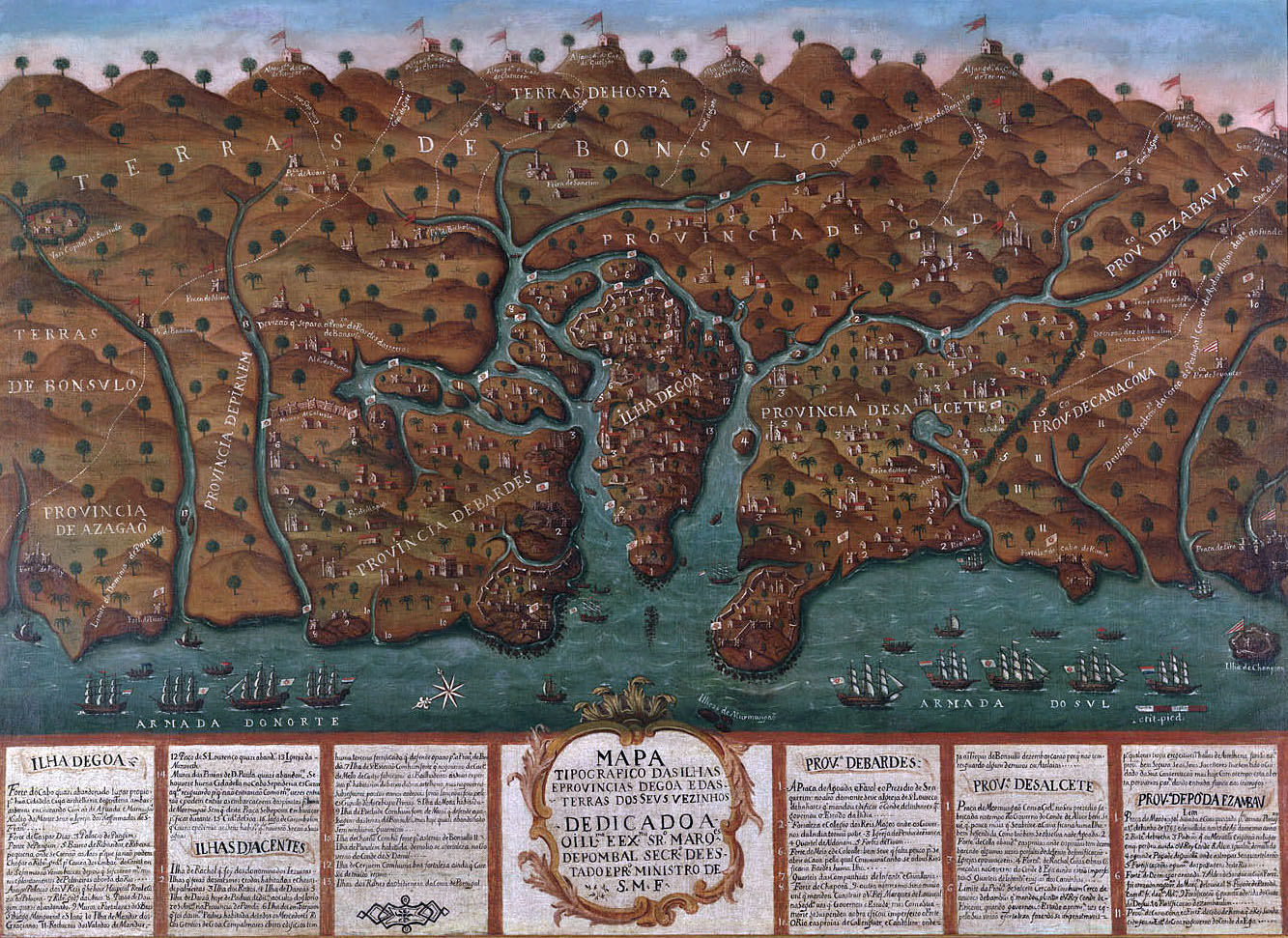
- Portuguese topographic map of Goa, 18th century.
Date	April 1683 – 6 February 1684
Location	Konkan, India

Belligerents
Maratha Empire; Supported by: British East India Company	Portuguese Empire; Kingdom of Sawantwadi; Supported by: Mughal Empire

Commanders and leaders
Sambhaji; Yesaji Kank; Krishnaji Kank †	Count of Alvor

Strength
11,000 infantry, 6,000 cavalry	3,700 infantry, 20 cannons, Unknown naval vessels Desai rebels

Casualties and losses
Unknown	Unknown

The Maratha–Portuguese War of 1683–1684 or Sambhaji's Invasion refers to the Maratha invasion of the Portuguese-controlled portions of Goa and Bombay areas of Konkan. The conflict between the Mahratta Confederacy and the Portuguese in Goa and Bombay; continued on various fronts in between 1683 and 1684.

The Portuguese had maintained relations with the Marathas under Shivaji, in order to check the Deccan Sultanates. In 1682, two years after the death of Shivaji, Sambhaji started arming & fortifying the border along Portuguese territories. The concerned Portuguese then aligned themselves with the Moghals.

Their concern materialised in a series of Maratha raids on Goa, Bombay & other parts of the Konkan region. Sambhaji invaded Goa, temporarily occupied many forts, ports & razed villages there. His forces pillaged Salcette and Bardes in South Konkan for 26 days, burned down villages, destroyed churches, raped Konkani women, captured men and women as slaves, and sold them to Arabs and the Dutch later on. Sambhaji also plundered or ransacked places of North Konkan near Bombay, he besieged the fortresses of Chaul, Damaon & Bassein (Vasai) in the north. The Maratha forces were preemptively mobilised, and the Portuguese situation eventually became dire. Sambhaji had intended to capture the city of Old Goa, but the violence ceased, his forces retreated from most Portuguese lands in the Konkan, on 2 January 1684, to avoid the large Moghal army led by Shah Alam I (Muazzam).

The Desais of Sawantwadi rebelled and sided with the Portuguese in the conflict, as they were forced to give up their political privileges due to Maratha supremacy. According to the Portuguese: This was the first time when the British, secretly aided the enemy, by providing the Mahrattas with weapons, artillery & munitions.

== Background ==
The Portuguese Empire was a powerful naval empire that had established several enclaves on the west coast of India. The Portuguese territories of Damaon, Chaul, Vasai (Bassein) & several others bordered the Mahratta Confederacy; including the capital at Old Goa.

The Marathas during the lifetime of Shivaji had maintained relations with Portuguese India, as Shivaji's famous Bhavani and Firangi swords were of Portuguese origin. However, his expansionist successor Sambhaji, wanted to check the Portuguese by constructing forts at strategic locations, such as the island of Anjediva, off the coast of present-day North Canara; and Parsik Hill in modern-day New Bombay. Sambhaji also fostered good relations with the Yarubid Omanis, an enemy of the Portuguese. The Portuguese were alarmed at the mobilisation of Maratha forces at their borders and attempted to stop the construction of the forts in 1683. On 5 May 1682 the Portuguese fortified Angediva Island. and later also fortified Parsik Hill. In December 1682, the Portuguese allowed the Mughal army to pass through their northern territories to attack the Marathas. The Portuguese also annexed Parsik in January 1683, the Portuguese viceroy received at Goa a letter from Aurangzeb requesting that the Portuguese declare war on the Marathas, but the viceroy refused and said that the Portuguese did not declare wars unless for very serious reasons, which was not the case.

The Portuguese Viceroy Francisco de Távora in turn wanted the capture of Sambhaji.

== Bassein theatre ==
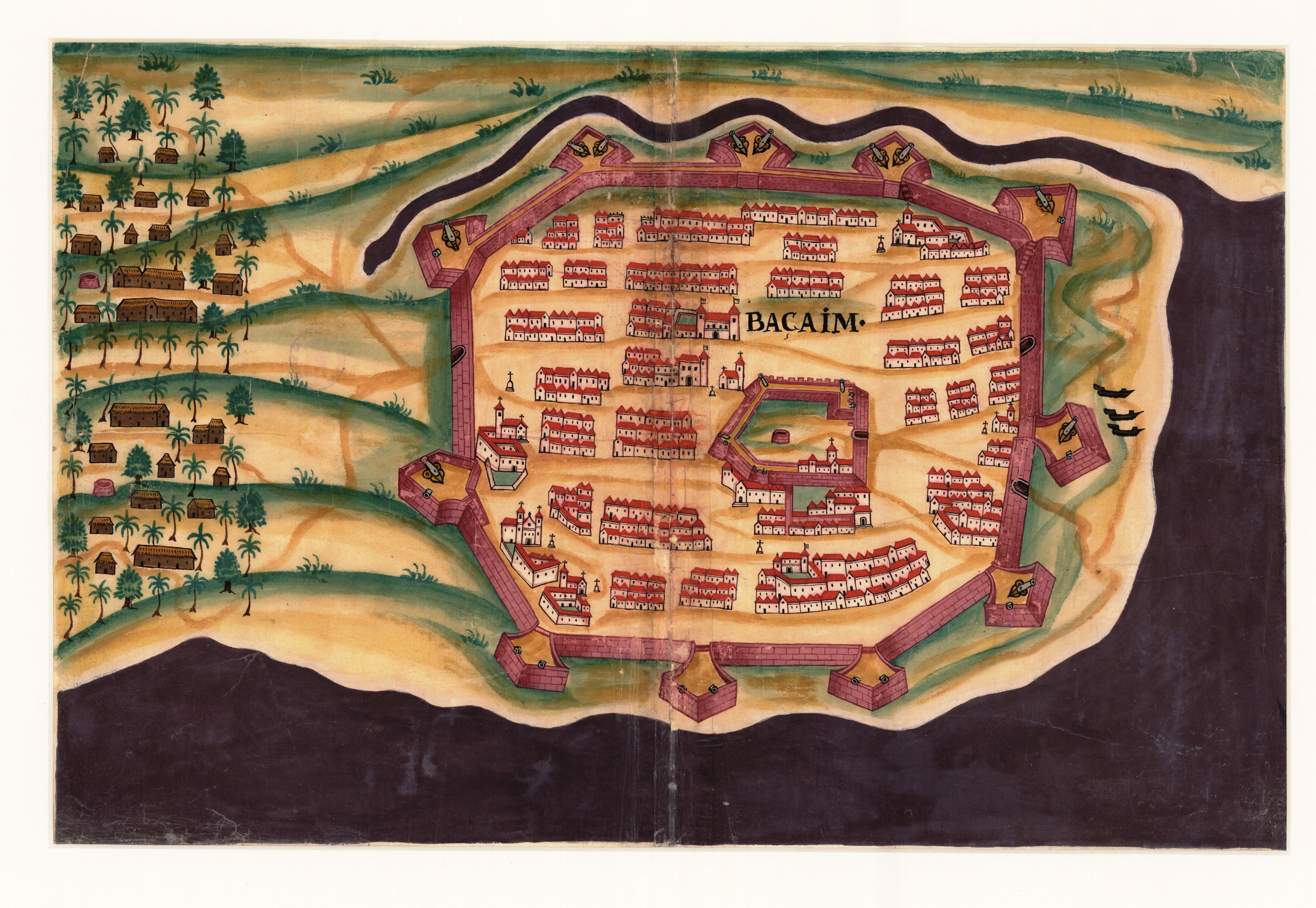
The Portuguese fortress of Bassein.

Between April and May 1683, the Marathas invaded Portuguese Konkan in the north and plundered Portuguese-controlled towns and villages at Dahanu, Asheri, Trapor, & Vasai (Bassein). Sambhaji's Peshwa Nilopant Pingle devastated, plundered and occupied 40 miles of Portuguese territory including the villages of Chembur, Talode, Kolve, Mahim, Dantore & Sargaon. Mahrattas also temporarily occupied some forts around Bassein and Damaon.

== Chaul theatre ==
The Brahmin Peshva Nilopant Pingle kept the pressure on Chaul. The Marathas plundered the villages in July 1683. On 10 August 1683 they sieged Chaul with 2000 horsemen and 6000 infantry in the siege of Chaul. On August 18, they attempted to storm the fortress, however they were repulsed.

== Goa theatre ==
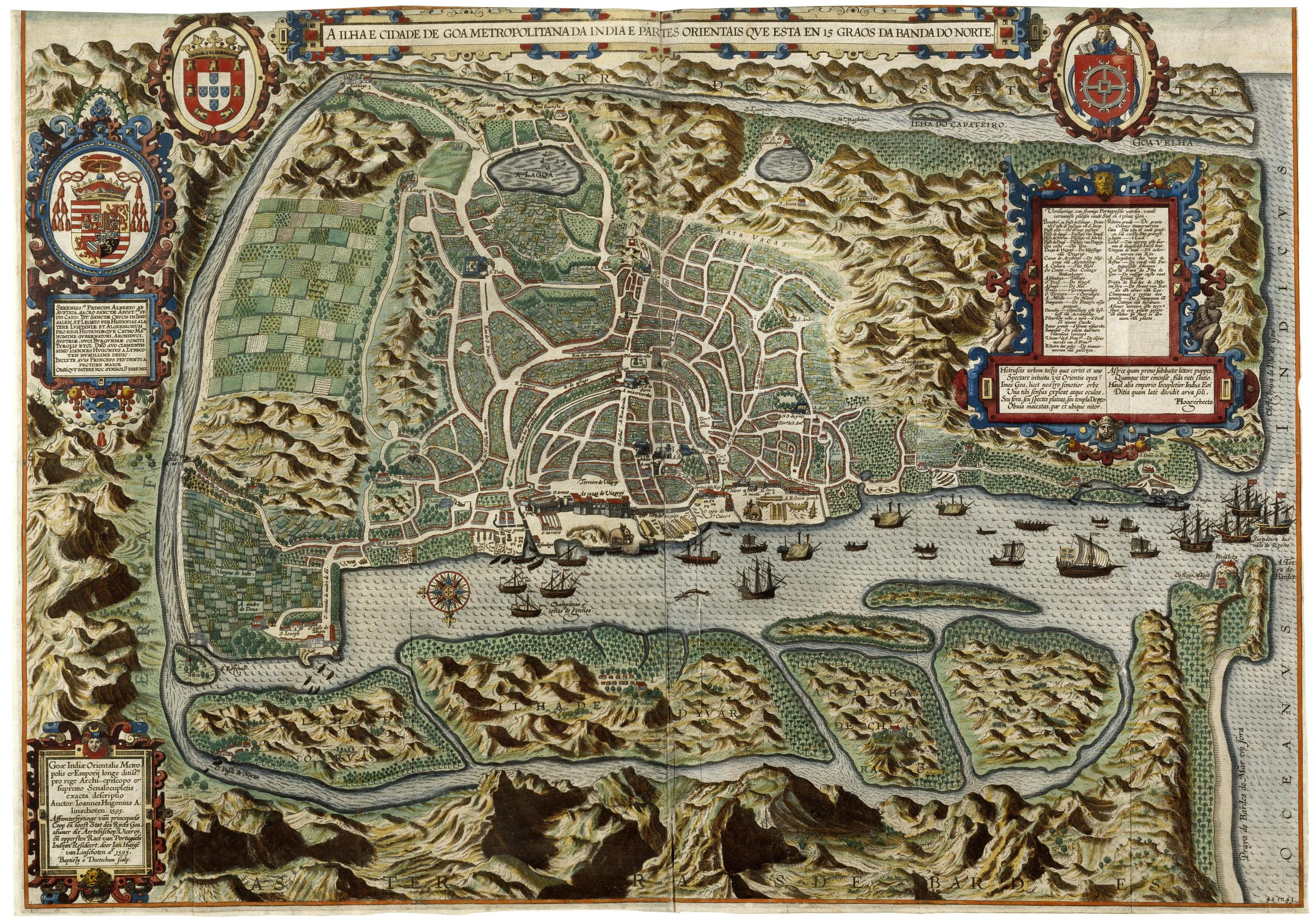
Portuguese Goa

Because that year Portugal did not send soldiers to India, Maratha forces were able to invade the mainland Portuguese districts of Bardes in the north and Salcete to the south, raiding and burning everything in their path and sacking churches. This was the first time the Marathas employed their tactic of attacking Goa as a diversionary tactic to their operations further north.

According to an account by Padre Francisco de Souza, Marathas looted, destroyed Churches and raped Christian women. After they had completed sacking, they carried off with themselves many men, women and children whom they later sold to Arabs and Dutch. Jadunath Sarkar notes that the Marathas were notorious for gang-raping women during invasions, including the invasion of Goa under Sambhaji. He elaborates on this by quoting a contemporary account of the event.

These enemies were so barbarous that when a woman appeared very beautiful (lit., best) to them, five or six of them violated her by lying with that woman alone, Up to now nowhere else in India has such barbarity been seen, nor even among the Kafris (Negroes). For this reason, many women of Margaon ... threw themselves into pools, where they died of drowning. Others who bravely resisted the lewd intentions of some of the enemy soldiers, were killed with strokes of the broadsword, and of some others the breasts were cut off.

In response, the Portuguese arrested the Maratha envoy in Goa Yesaji Gambhir. Maratha merchant ships were also arrested.

The Portuguese viceroy Francisco de Távora mobilised the civilians and clergymen in the city into a defensive force of militias and established a last line of defense at Mormugão fort.

=== Battle of Ponda ===
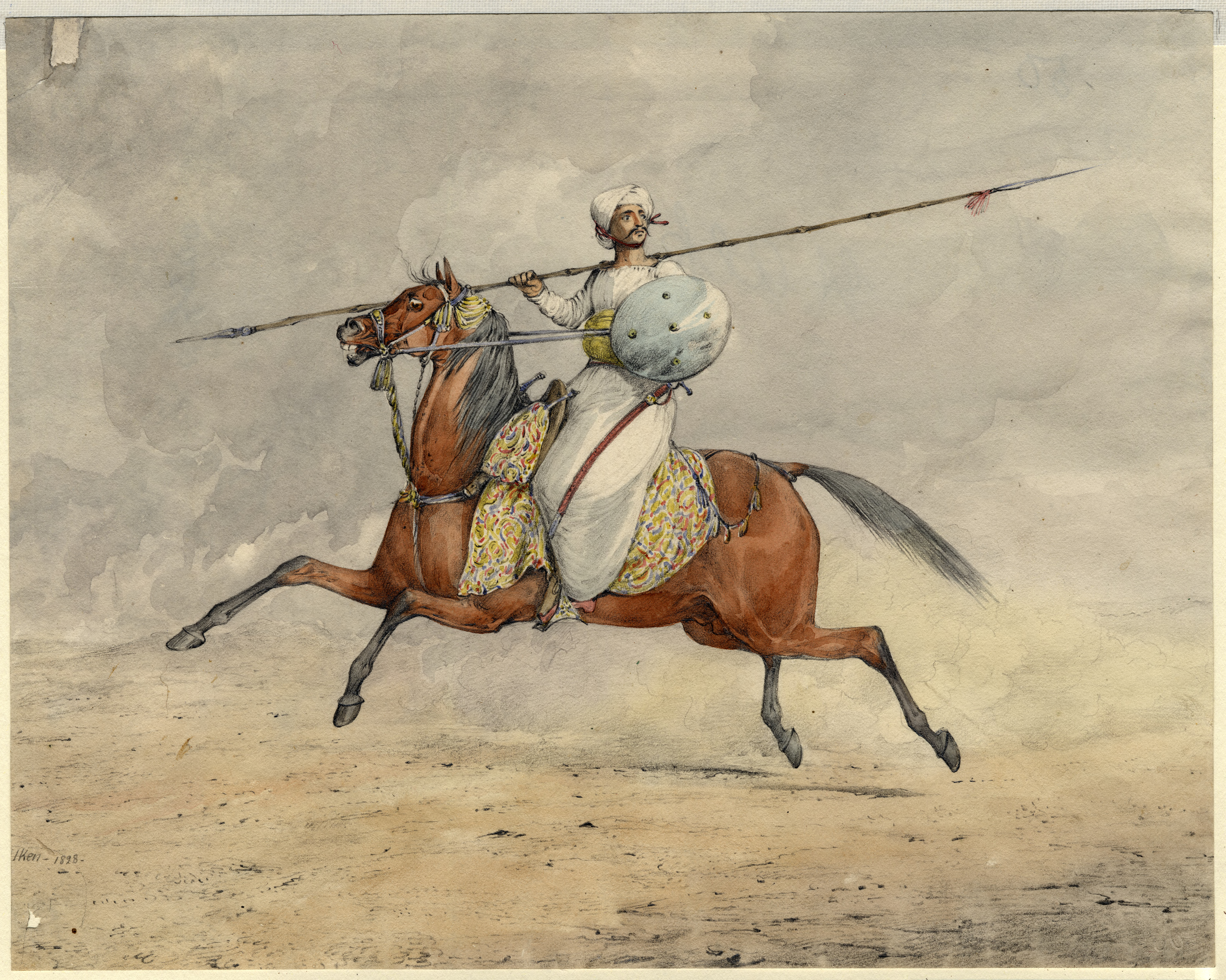
Maratha horseman.

The Ponda Fort near the capital city of Velha Goa was a strategic Maratha position. Hence the Portuguese viceroy Francisco de Távora led an attack on it in October 1683, attempting to prevent raids on Goa. The Portuguese viceroy attacked Ponda to compel the Marathas to lift the siege of Chaul and heavily damaged the Ponda Fort; so that they may go back to the inland Panhala Fort near Chaul. He marched towards the fort with 1206 Portuguese soldiers and 2500 Christian auxiliaries from Salcete. Most of the Konkan Desais (lords) maintained friendly relations with the Portuguese; the Desai of Bicholim and the Ranas of Sanquelim lived in Portuguese territory; the Dulba Desai of Ponda, and the vatandar of Revode, Nanonde, and Pirna Satroji Rane joined the Portuguese against the Marathas.

The viceroy camped at the border village of Agaçaim on 27 October 1683. They crossed the river and reached the villages west of Ponda on 7 November. Veteran Maratha general Yesaji Kank and his son Krishnaji were stationed at Ponda with a force of 600 Mavalas. The Marathas resisted the initial Portuguese infantry charges. In one of these skirmishes Krishnaji Kank was wounded heavily, he died a few days later. However, The Portuguese heavy bombardment managed to break through the walls of the fort, severely damaging it. Heavy rains however impeded Portuguese movements.

Sambhaji ordered reinforcements to press on the advantage of the Portuguese retreat at Ponda and elsewhere. By 9 November Maratha reinforcements, which included Sambhaji himself, arrived from Rajapur to rescue the fort. He had 800 cavalry and 600 infantry. The viceroy thought that Sambhaji would attack him to the rear to cut his line of communication with Goa, hence on 10 November, he called for a general retreat towards the Durbhat port. The Marathas attacked the retreating Portuguese by attacking them from a hill above a nearby creek. The viceroy was wounded during this skirmish. On 12 November most of the Portuguese army reached Goa. The Portuguese conducted an organised withdrawal and returned safely without the loss of equipment. Portuguese praised the victory of Sambhaji and they described him as a war-like prince.

=== Siege of Goa ===
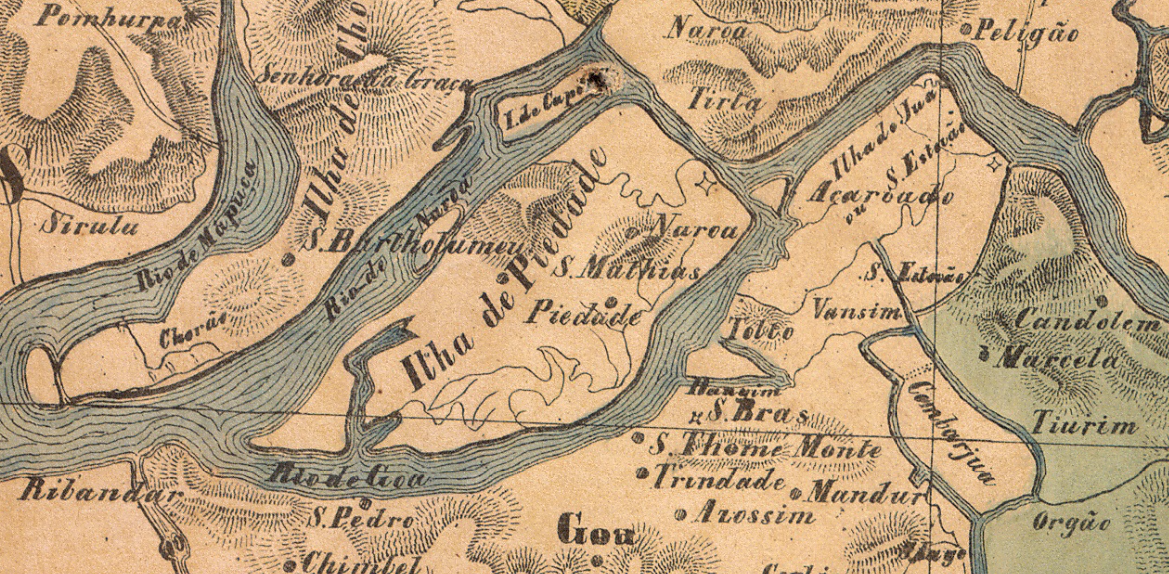
Islands of Goa with Santo Estêvão (Jua) on the right.

On the night of 24 November 1683, when the tide was low, Sambhaji's full force attacked the unsuspecting fort and village on Santo Estêvão island. They captured Fort Santo Estevão by killing its garrison, looted the native Goan villagers, and burned down the parish church. The following day a battalion of 200 men marched from Goa to Santo Estevão under the personal command of the Viceroy in order to recapture the island. They engaged in fighting but soon after retreated. Seeing the size of the Maratha army, and the devastation caused by them, the battalion retreated.

After the arrival of the retreating army and the fall of Santo Estêvão, the Portuguese broke the bunds of rice fields on the outskirts of the city of Goa. This flooded the fields with river water and increased the width of the river. Sambhaji had intended to assault Goa but was prevented by the rising tide combined with the flood of the rice fields. The Marathas later retreated due to the probability of a Portuguese naval attack.

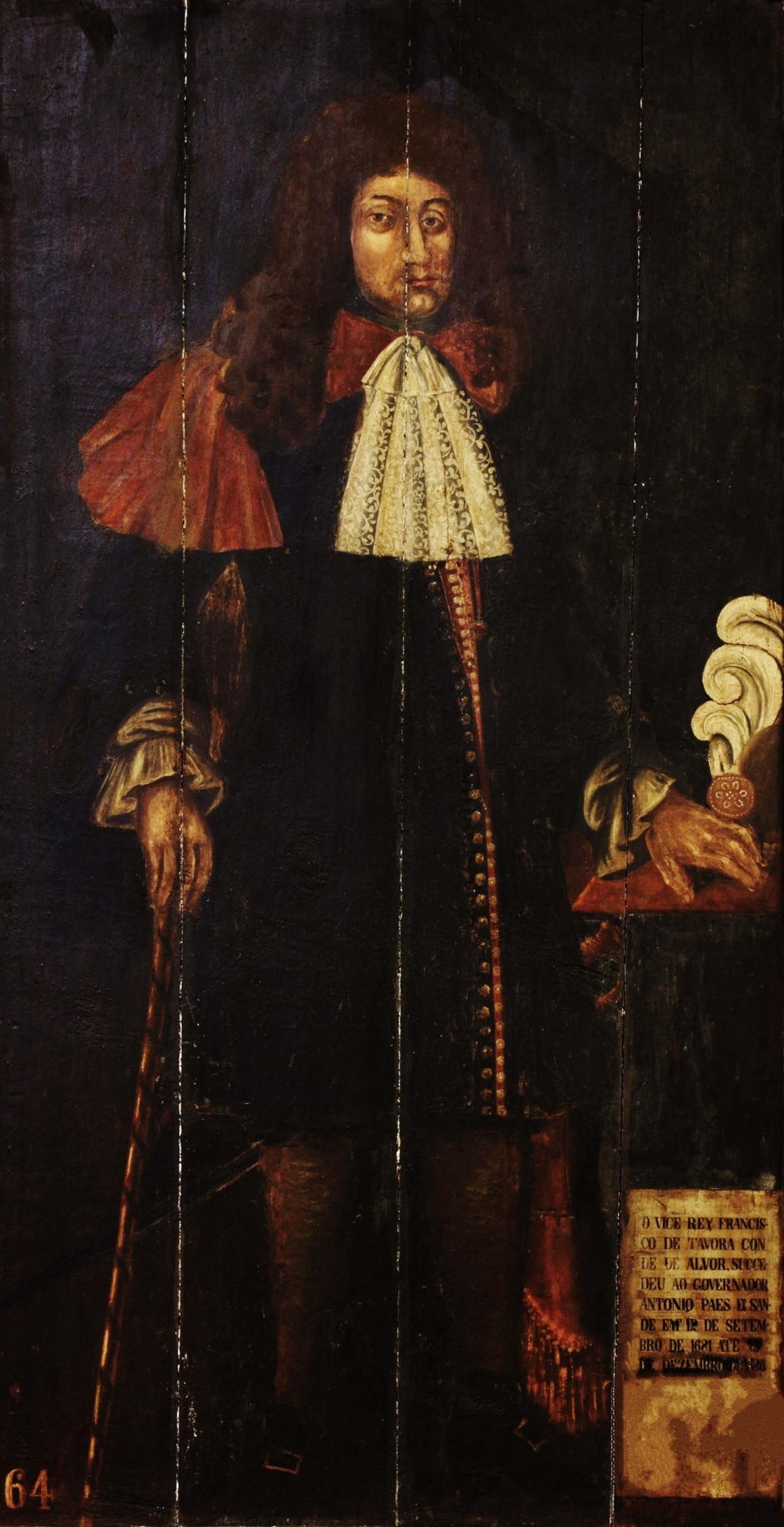
The Portuguese viceroy of Goa, Count of Alvor Dom Francisco de Távora.

The viceroy Dom Francisco de Távora wrote to the Mughal emperor Aurangzeb informing him of the attack on Goa and urging him to move against the Marathas. News reached both Sambhaji and the viceroy, that a Mughal prince, Muazzam, had entered into Maratha territory with a 100,000 strong force. The Mughals took advantage of Sambhaji's war with the Portuguese. Sambhaji tried to bribe Muazzam to get him to use his army against the Portuguese before the Mughal army could reach Goa. With this failing, Sambhaji prepared to storm Portuguese territory and attack poorly defended villages.

On 11 December 1683, 6000 Maratha cavalry and 8000-10000 infantry attacked the areas of Salcette and Bardes. The Portuguese successfully defended the inner territories of Ilhas de Goa and Mormugão from the onslaught of Marathas. All the other villages and forts were temporarily occupied by the Marathas. The Commissioner of the French East India Company, François Martin, described the poor condition of the Portuguese during this time. After having laid waste to the outer districts of Salcete and Bardez, the Marathas had started closing in towards the Islands of Goa. The viceroy was concerned that if things remain unchanged, Sambhaji would soon capture Goa. During this time, Muazzam was pillaging Maratha territory as he made his approach towards Sambhaji. When Sambhaji learned of Muazzam's arrival at Ramghat, fearing the large Moghul army, he retreated all his forces back to Raigad Fort on 2 January 1684.

Contemporary sources give credit to Francis Xavier for saving Goa: the Portuguese viceroy had placed a request in the saint's hands for Xavier to take over governance of Goa and save it from the Maratha army, along with his baton. Xavier then caused the Mughal army to threaten the Marathas, which in turn saved Goa.

== Treaty of Ponda 1684 ==
Since he was unable to fight a war on two fronts, Sambhaji asked the Portuguese for a peace treaty. He sent Prince Akbar and Kavi Kalash to negotiate with the Portuguese. After long negotiations, a final treaty was approved at Mardangad in Ponda, between 25 January and 4 February.

The Luso-Maratha Treaty of Ponda of 1684 stipulated that 1) All lands, forts, artillery, and weapons would restitute to Portugal; 2) All captured vessels would be returned; 3) All prisoners would be returned; 4) Sambhaji would be paid a pension in exchange for helping defend Portuguese territory; 5) Mutual free trade and liberty of movement; 6) Prohibition of Mughal trade ships to pass within range of the artillery of Portuguese fortresses; 7) Pardon from Sambhaji to the Desai's in Goa; 8) On the request of the Portuguese, Sambhaji was prohibited from building forts along the Portuguese border.

The Marathas retreated from all their new possessions, in order to concentrate their forces against the Mughals. Hostilities ceased on 6 February.

== Aftermath ==
The campaign was a severe breach of trust in Maratha–Portuguese relations. On 12 January 1684, the viceroy called a meeting of the state council to shift the capital Goa to Mormugao fortress further west. This proposal was rejected, and the capital continued to be the City of Goa.

The Marathas did not willingly return occupied territory to Portugal, and parts of it, like Caranja island, had to be forcibly recaptured. The Marathas did not respect the peace treaty for very long and conflicts between the two powers continued in the following years, as Marathas continued raiding Portuguese territory. The viceroy, therefore, promoted a coalition with the rebellious Konkan Desai's, and signed with them a secret treaty against the Marathas on 8 February 1685.

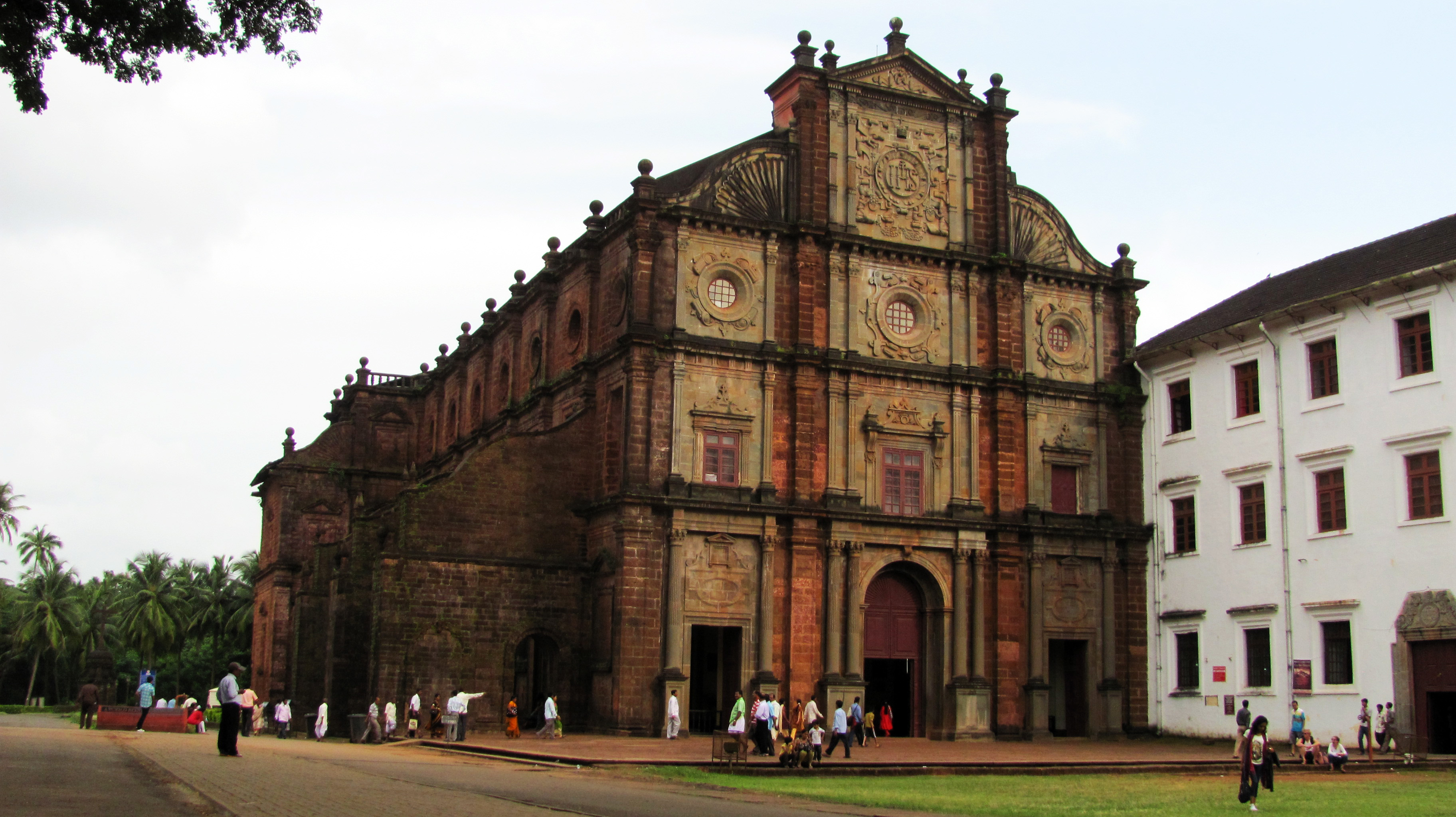
Bom Jesus Basilica

It is said that when the Marathas occupied Santo Estêvão island, the viceroy went to see the body of Francis Xavier, in the Bom Jesus shrine in the Velha Goa city, placed his sceptre on the dead saint's relic and prayed for his grace to avert the Maratha threat.

== See also ==
- Hindutva terrorism
- Luso–Maratha War (1729–1732)
- Mughal–Portuguese War (1692–1693)
- Military history of Portugal
- Mughal invasions of Konkan (1684)
- Mahratta Invasion of Bassein
- Maratha invasions of Bengal
- Portuguese India
- Sack of Surat
