= Fort Santo Estevão =

- Fortaleza de Santo Estevão
- Goa in India
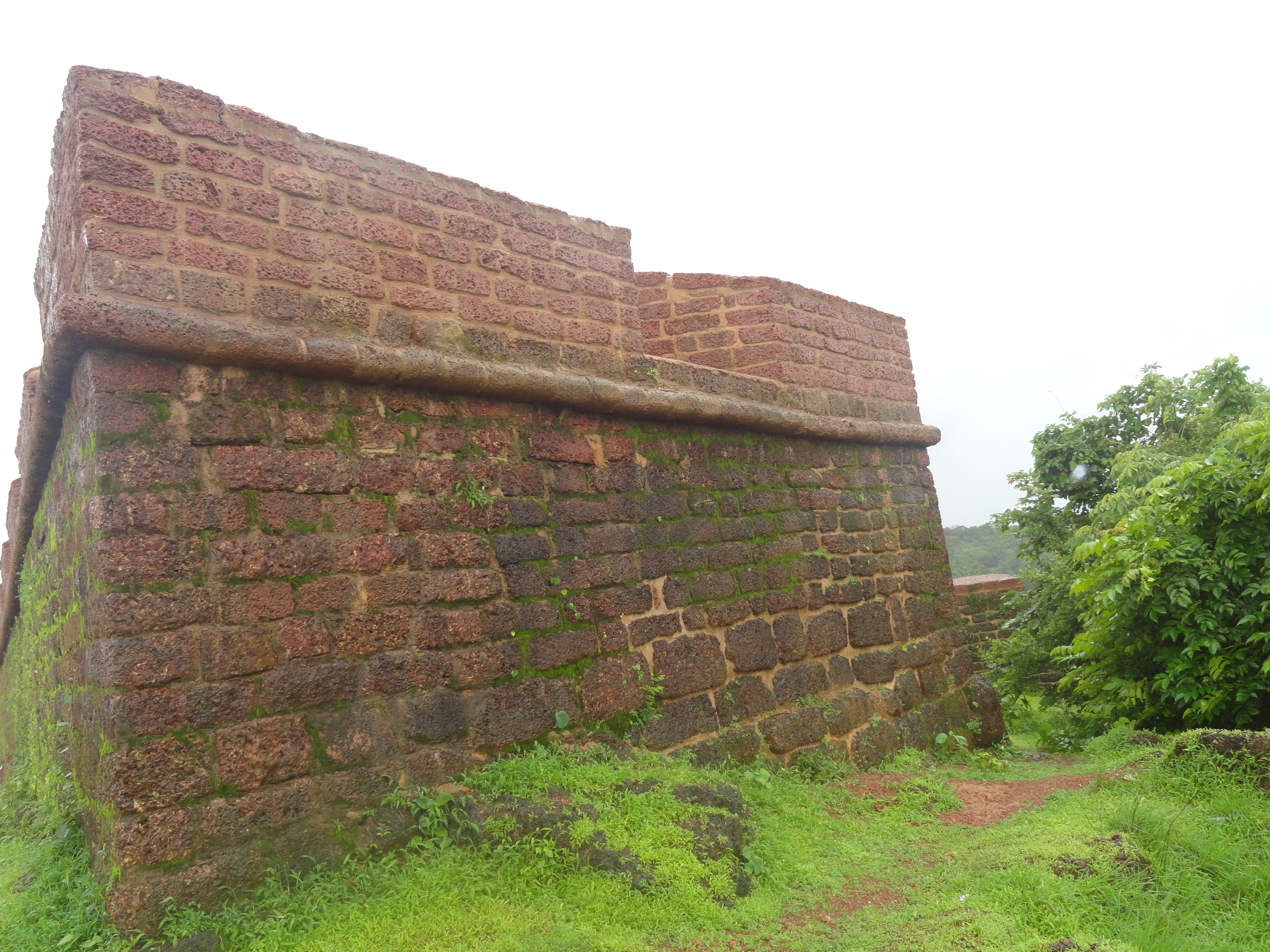
- Walls of Santo Estevão.

Site information
- Condition: Good

Location
- Coordinates: 15°32′10″N 73°57′15″E

Site history
- Built by: Portuguese Empire

Fort Santo Estevão (Fortaleza de Santo Estevão in Portuguese) is a military structure erected in Santo Estevão Island, in Goa, by the Portuguese.

Built on the highest point of Santo Estevão Island, it was originally built as a watchtower to guard the Mandovi River, in 1550. It was the easternmost defensive structure in the Velhas Conquistas. After the first Maratha incursions against Goa, in 1666-1668, The structure was expanded into a small fort. In 1683, the Marathas attacked Goa and managed to breach into the island of Santo Estevão because the corps of auxiliaries tasked with defending it fled from their enemy. The Marathas captured the fort and massacred its garrison.

After the annexation of the Novas Conquistas, the fort lost its military purpose. It was abandoned in 1811 by decree of the Viceroy of India Dom Bernardo José Maria da Silveira e Lorena.

Restoration works were undertaken on the fort in 2012.

== See also ==
- Portuguese India
- History of Goa
- Maratha invasion of Goa (1683)
