= Luso-Maratha War (1729–1732) =

Historical conflict in India

Luso–Maratha War
Date	May 1729 – 30 January 1732
Location	Konkan, India
Result	Status quo ante bellum

Belligerents
Portuguese Empire; East India Company	Maratha Empire

Commanders and leaders
(Portuguese Empire) João de Saldanha da Gama (Portuguese Empire) Francisco Mesquita (Portuguese Empire) Martinho Silveira	(Maratha Empire) Bajirao I (Maratha Empire) Pilaji Jadhavrao

The Luso–Maratha War was a military conflict fought between the Portuguese and the Maratha Empires, initiated by the Marathas invading and raiding Portuguese-controlled villages near the walled city of Damaon.

== Context ==
After a war against the Marathas, João Saldanha da Gama Portuguese viceroy at Old Goa, had previously signed with the Maratha Confederacy a peace treaty in 1726, which resulted in the "peace of Bassein", which would prove to be brief.

Despite the peace treaty, in May 1729, Maratha forces under the command of Pilaji Jadhavrao raided two villages in the vicinity of the Portuguese fortified city of Damaon. Since the Marathas often excused their raids as the work of brigands, the captain of the Portuguese forces in the area, General Francisco da Guerra de Mesquita, was instructed by the viceroy to conduct limited retaliatory attacks against the border Maratha towns from which such raids had come.

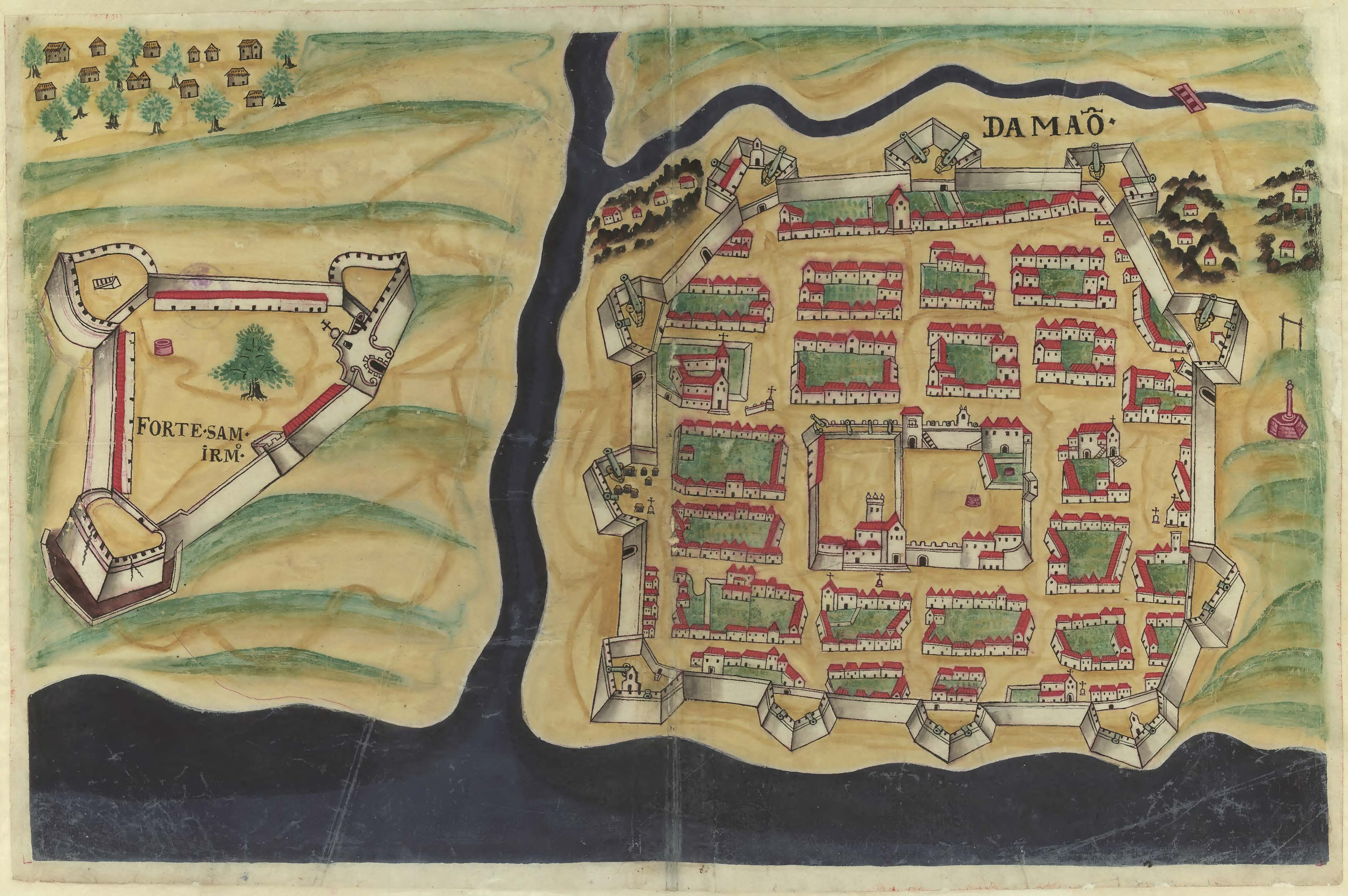
Portuguese forts of Daman

The Marathas took Portuguese retaliation of their raids as a sign that the peace treaty had been broken. By the end of May 1730, the Marathas invaded the areas around Bassein (Vasai) and war spread across the Konkan region. The Mahratta Confederacy had not attacked Portuguese territory in so much force since the time of Sambhaji.

== Course of hostilities ==
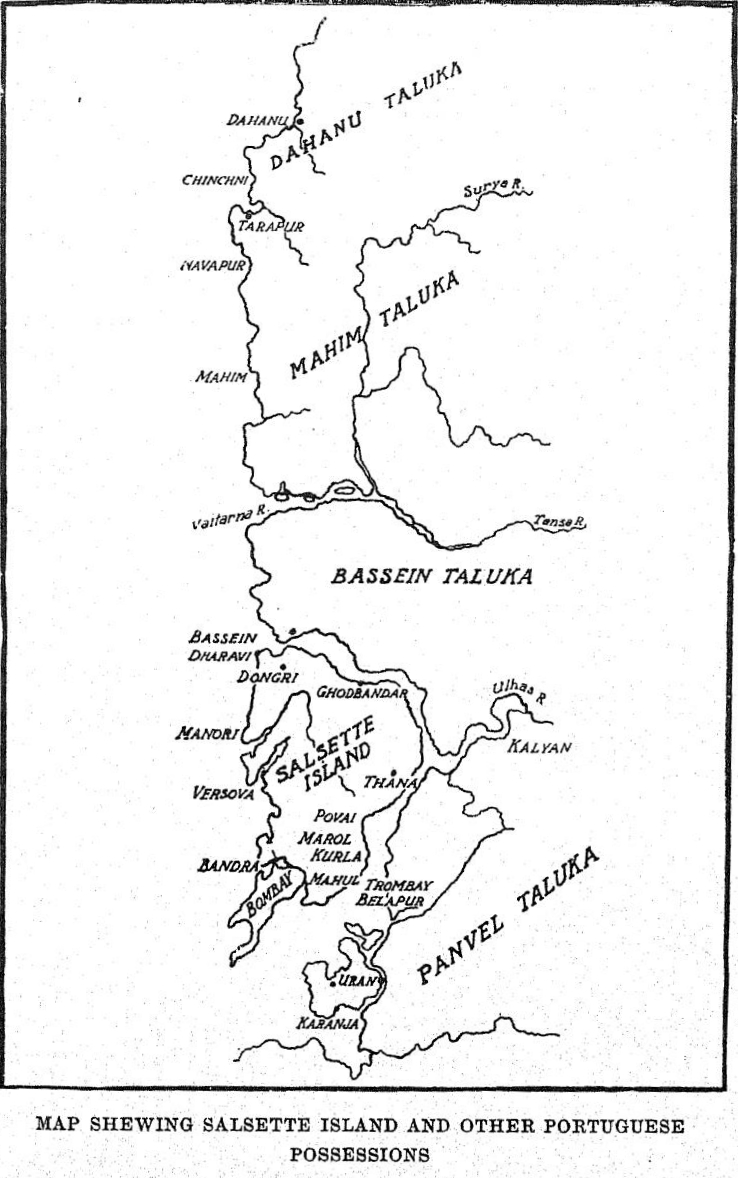
Portuguese territory in the north Konkan.

In spite of Maratha numerical superiority, lack of internal unity made military operations difficult, and the Portuguese viceroy was approached with a peace offer through the English East India Company governor Robert Cowan in Bombay. The viceroy proposed to return captured Maratha belongings, however he refused to sign a peace while Portuguese territory was occupied by Maratha forces while the Marathas refused to return captured spoils or make peace unless the Portuguese paid tribute and allowed Hindu temples to be built on their territory.

Realizing that the Marathas would not make peace unless directly threatened, the viceroy dispatched reinforcements from Goa were to general Guerra de Mesquita, along with instructions to persistently raid Maratha territory and also engage in psychological warfare by threatening to forcibly baptize Hindu prisoners, which in the words of the viceroy, "they resent much" though the general was forbidden from actually carrying out this task. On 28 October 1730 Bagi Rao wrote to the British governor in Bombay stating: "The dispute between us and the Portuguese over Galiana-Biundi is notorious, and we have been conquering and will conquer their territories."

The British aided the Portuguese in 1730 with 200 musketeers, of which 50 were Europeans and 150 sepoys, 250 sepoys and 6 galliots.

By then, the shortage of fodder in the region threatened to bring Maratha cavalry incursions to a halt. Although numerically inferior, the Portuguese prevented the Marathas from taking advantage of their numerical superiority by engaging in vigorous offensive warfare with a mobile army, which pinned the Marathas. On April 3, 1731, the viceroy decreed a general conscription for all Portuguese except those charged with Lèse-majesté. After reinforcements had arrived in Bassein, through persistent Portuguese attacks, Maratha offensive operations ceased.

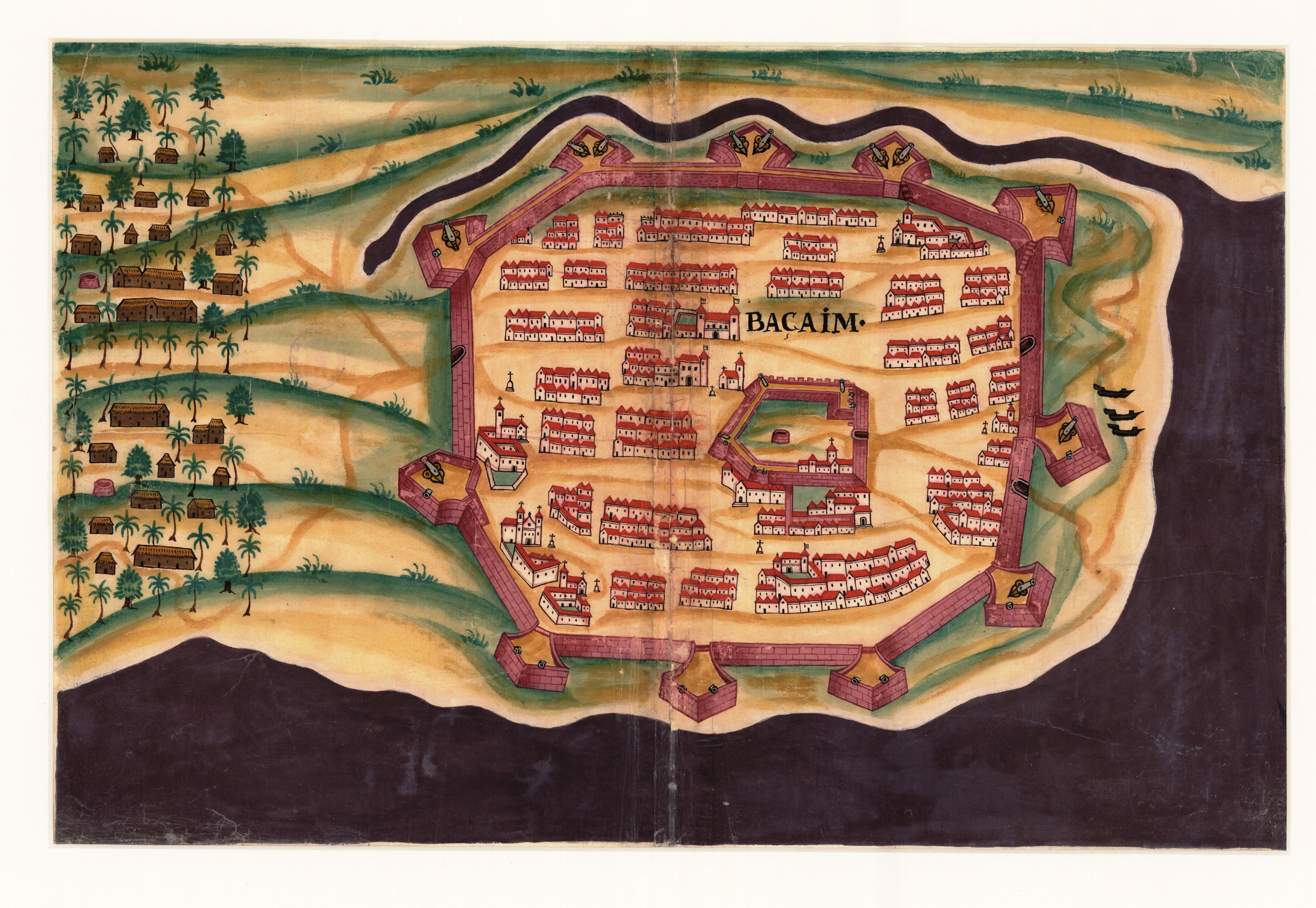
Portuguese fortified city of Bassein.

Successful Portuguese operations brought the Marathas to the negotiating table. During negotiations however, in mid June Pilaji Jadhavrao captured a Portuguese fort in Cambá without firing a shot, by convincing its garrison to hand it over. It appears the Portuguese commander Luís de Melo de Sampaio was invited for talks under the guise of a truce and then held hostage until the fort was evacuated. The viceroy later criticized Melo de Sampaio for having failed the established custom of requesting hostages from the Marathas before talks, which would have uncovered the ruse. As a result of the treachery, the Portuguese called off peace negotiations, arrested the Maratha ambassador along with his family and attendants and hostilities continued.

Persistent Maratha offers for peace in exchange for tribute, without withdrawing from Portuguese territory, were refused. The Marathas threatened to invade Goa, capital of Portuguese India, however this failed to intimidate the viceroy. At the same time, the Portuguese sought to convince the Mughals to attack the Marathas. Local Indian lords proved unreliable in their support for either side, inconsistently favouring whoever appeared to have the military advantage or initiative.

== Treaty of Bombay 1732 and peace ==
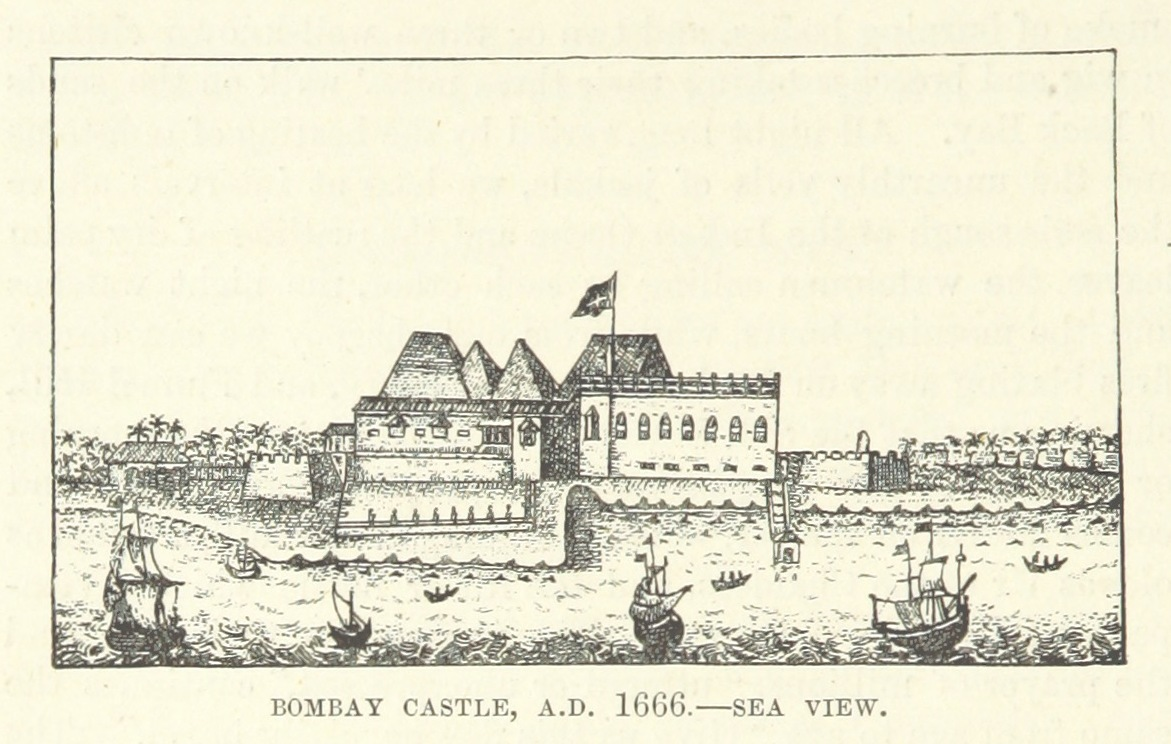
Bombay Castle.

By January 1732, the Marathas had been immobilized for six months, unable to effectively combat the Portuguese due to internal civil affairs in their territories beyond the Konkan, and a Mughal army under the command of Quiliscan was fast approaching. Many Marathas had begun to seek refuge in Portuguese territory from the advancing Mughals. The Portuguese had secretly promised aid to the Mughals against the Marathas.

Under the mediation of the British governor in Bombay, in 30 January a peace treaty was signed in Bombay Castle between the Portuguese, represented by Francisco de Melo de Castro and the Marathas, represented by Siva Rama Pandit and Raiagi Ramagi.

== Aftermath ==
The Marathas withdrew from Portuguese territory. Nevertheless, Bajirao planned to resume hostilities against the Portuguese with an attack on Salcette Island on 13 March 1733. Peace would prove to be short, as five years later the Marathas would again invade Portuguese territory and attack Bassein.

== See also ==
- Maratha–Portuguese War (1683–1684)
- Portuguese India
- Mughal-Maratha Wars
- Battle of Vasai

== Sources ==
- Lobato, Alexandre (1965). Relações luso-maratas, 1658-1737 (in Portuguese). Centro de Estudos Históricos Ultramarinos.
- Pedro Nobre: "The East India Company and the Portuguese loss of the Província do Norte" in Revista Tempo
- Frederick Charles Danvers: The Portuguese in India A. D. 1571-1894 W. H. Allen & Co. Limited, 1894,
- Panduronga Pissurlencar: Portuguese-Maratha Relations, Maharashtra State Board for Literature and Culture, Bombay, 1983
- Peshwa Bajirao maratha expansion
