= Siege of Alorna =

1746 conflict between the Portuguese and Maratha Empires in Goa, India

Coordinates: 15.700°N 73.905°E

- Part of Novas Conquistas
Date	4 May 1746
Location	Pernem, Goa
Result	Portuguese victory

Belligerents
Portuguese Empire	Maratha Empire: Sawantwadi State

Commanders and leaders
Dom Pedro Miguel de Almeida Portugal e Vasconcelos: Colonel Pierripont; Fleet general António de Figueiredo e Utra	Gomo Saunto

Strength
1,500 infantry, 900 cavalry	1,100 infantry, 300 cavalry.

Casualties and losses
36 dead.	500 dead.

The siege of Alorna in 1746 was a military engagement that took place in India, between Portuguese forces under the command of the Viceroy of India, Dom Pedro Miguel de Almeida Portugal, and those of the Sawantwadi State then part of the Maratha Confederacy, which were defeated. It was the crowning achievement in the career of Dom Pedro Miguel as Viceroy of India, and as a reward for his services to the Portuguese Crown he was later attributed the title Marquis of Alorna.

== Context ==
In 1741, the Marathas overran the Bardez and Salcette districts of Portuguese Goa, being later forced to withdraw by the Viceroy, Marquis of Louriçal. An enemy of the Portuguese, the neighbouring Bhonsles of Sawantwadi, who were part of the Maratha Confederacy, were forced to make peace, but shortly afterwards renewed the hostilities against Goa, harassing its shipping and raiding its border territories.

The fort of Alorna is located by the Arondem river, close to the Western Ghats. Although erected in a disfavourable low territory, the quality and extension of its fortification works made it an important position, from which the Bhonsles launched successive raids on Portuguese territory, around Goa.

Considering the capture of the fort necessary to ensure the security of the hinterland around Goa, particularly the district of Bicholim, the Portuguese Viceroy of India Dom Pedro Miguel de Almeida Portugal e Vasconcelos determined to capture it in 1746. The fort was commanded by a close relative of the Sardesai.

Portuguese forces numbered 900 men divided in 6 companies of grenadiers and 17 light companies, 900 horsemen, 150 men in 2 companies of artillery, 250 caçadores from Bardez and Salcette divided in 2 companies, and 1200 sepoys.

== The siege ==
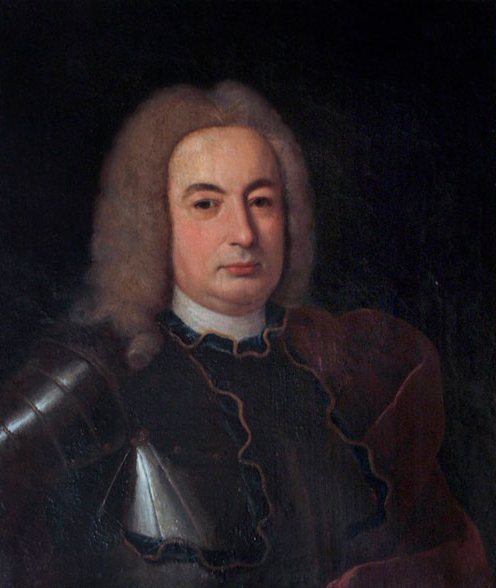
The Marquis of Alorna.

On the morning of May 4th 1746, Portuguese forces marched to Alorna by land and via the river, the Viceroy travelling on light ships up the river. By 10am, Portuguese boats bombarded a set of timber and earthen stockade the Bhonsles had erected by the river banks upstream and garrisoned with 300 men, which was captured by grenadiers. Once the infantry and cavalry was across, they marched to Alorna.

The fort of Alorna was built next to the river and consisted of an outer moat, outer walls with a single gate, inner moat and a square citadel with five towers. The entire complex was surrounded by thick bamboo woods.

The Portuguese began the siege by attacking the forts outer front gate with axes and gunpowder explosives, which were breached. Before they could assault the inner citadel, 300 horsemen of the Bhonsles attempted to attack the Portuguese artillery and baggage trains, however they were repulsed.

Meanwhile, the Bhonsles attempted to attack the Portuguese vessels stationed in the Chapora River with 15 galvetas, however they were unable to sail up the river due to two Portuguese warships deployed by the rivermouth.

After five hours of fighting, the fort was stormed by the Portuguese grenadiers, both via its gate, which was breached by gunpowder explosives, and taken by ladder assault.

== Aftermath ==
Novas Conquistas and Velhas Conquistas of Goa, Portuguese India.

The use of gunpowder explosives (petardos) to blast open the doors of Alorna proved decisive, as such weapons had never been seen or used in the region before.

After its capture, the fort was named Santa Cruz by the Portuguese soldiers. Subsequently, the forts of Bicholim and Sanquelim were also captured. Later that same year, between November and December the Portuguese captured the forts of Tiracol and Rarim. Two years later Neutim was captured.

In 1758, the Bhonsles attacked Alorna, Bicholim and Sanquelim, but failed to capture them.

After signing a treaty, the Portuguese government restored the fort of Alorna to the Bhonsles in 1761. Raids on Portuguese territory however, resumed after the fort was handed back to the Marathas and since the peace treaty would not be respected, the fort was once more captured by orders of Viceroy Dom Frederico Guilherme de Sousa, on 25th of August 1781.

== See also ==
- Portuguese India
- Alorna fort
- Siege of Tiracol
