= Siege of Tiracol =

1746 siege

- Part of Novas Conquistas
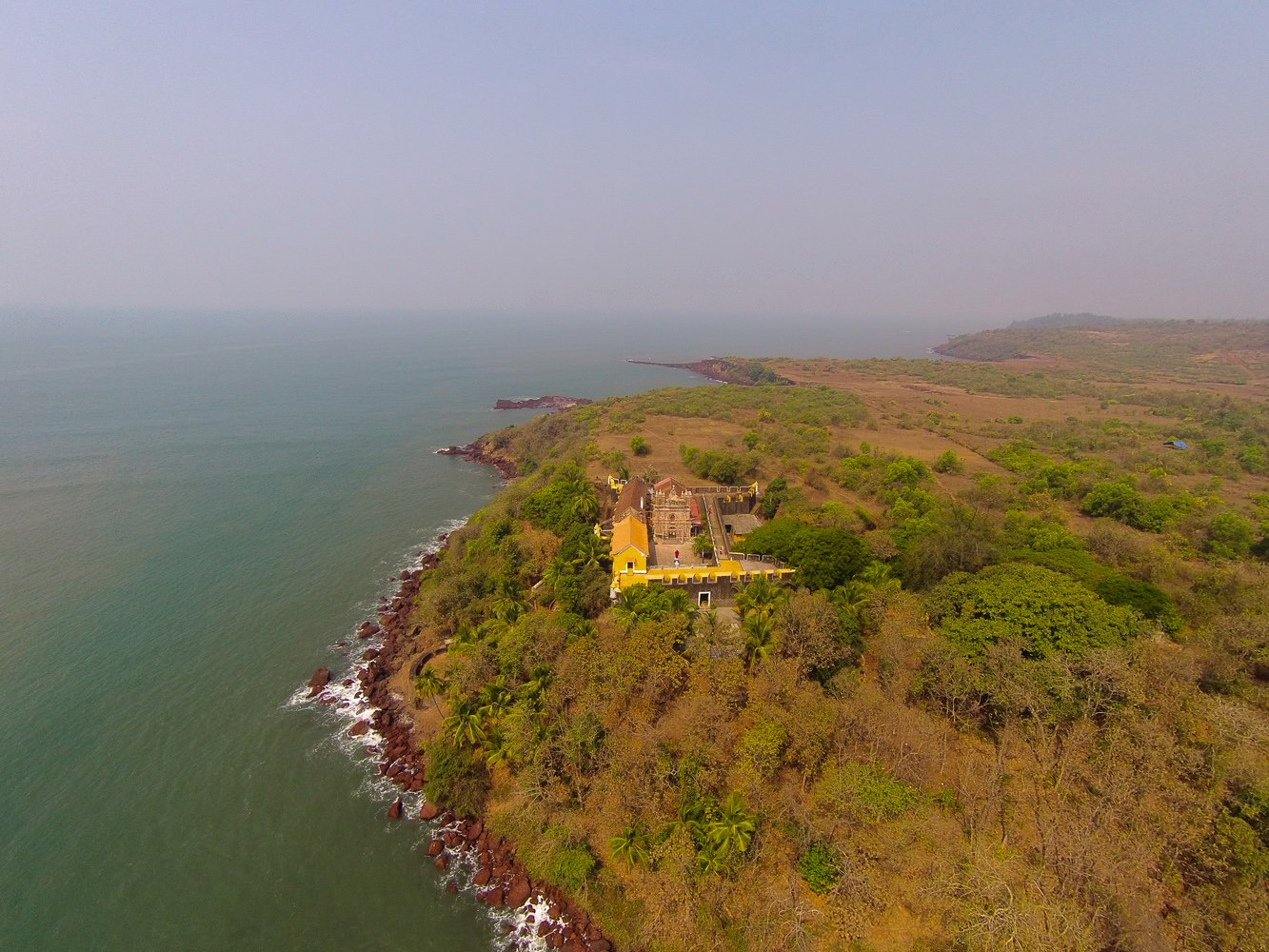
- The Portuguese-built Tiracol Fort.
Date	1746
Location	Tiracol, Goa
Result	Portuguese victory

Belligerents
Portuguese Empire	Maratha Empire: Sawantwadi State

Commanders and leaders
Dom Pedro Miguel de Almeida Portugal e Vasconcelos: Colonel Pierrepont; Fleet general António de Figueiredo e Utra	Ramachandra Savant I Bhonsle

Strength
27 vessels: 2 ships of the line; 5 palas; 20 smaller vessels; 3,690 men.: 1,000 infantry; 300 caçadores; 90 horsemen; 2,300 sepoys	200 men

Casualties and losses
500–600 dead	50+ killed

The Battle of Tiracol was a military engagement between Portuguese forces under the command of the Viceroy of India Dom Pedro Miguel de Almeida Portugal e Vasconcelos against the Bhonsles at Tiracol. It was part of the Novas Conquistas or "New Conquests" campaigns.

== Background ==
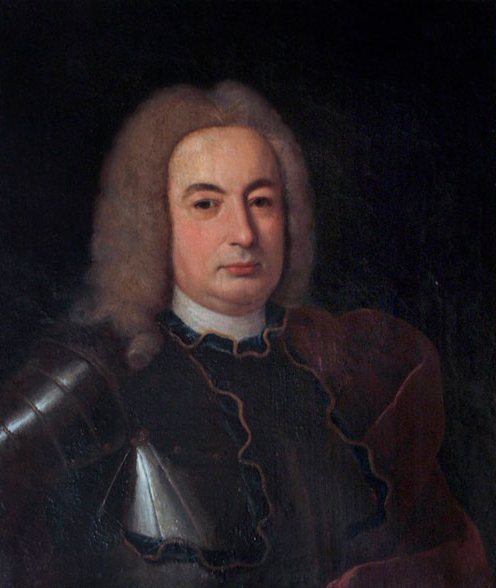
Dom Pedro Miguel de Almeida Portugal, 1st Marquis of Alorna

Due to persistent raids by the Bhonsles against Portuguese shipping and the border districts of Bardez and Pondá of Portuguese Goa, in Portuguese India, Viceroy Dom Pedro de Almeida Portugal decided to occupy the lands owned by the Bhonsles north of Goa. In April 1746 the Portuguese captured Bicholim, Alorna and Sanquelim, while a Portuguese fleet blockaded the mouth of the Chapora River.

The fort of Tiracol was the main base and haven of Bhonsle pirates and privateers. It was equipped with 34 guns and garrisoned by 200 men capable of bearing arms, while a heavy chain closed off the mouth of the river from naval entry. With the end of the monsoon rains by September, the Portuguese began preparing to occupy it.

The Viceroy mobilized two ships-of-the-line, five palas and 20 smaller craft. 3690 men, of which 1000 were footsoldiers, 300 caçadores, 90 horsemen, and 2300 sepoys, of which 1200 were led by the Raja of Sooda, 600 in the service of the Portuguese and 500 under the command of the dessais of Query.

The viceroy departed on his flagship Misericórdia on November 14, while the Portugues army marched overland towards Tiracol, opening a path through the jungle if necessary.

== Battle ==
By early morning of November 23 1746, Portuguese land forces took position in the vicinity of the fort of Tiracol while Portuguese vessels blockaded the rivermouth and bombarded both the fort as well as five Bhonsle palas then within the harbour, beyond the river chain. The ships of the Bhonsles responded vigorously, but within a few hours they had been heavily damaged, and their crews began to flee ashore.

By late afternoon, Portuguese soldiers assaulted the fort, which was captured after weak resistance.

== Aftermath ==
After its capture, the fort was christened Santíssima Trindade.

The Portuguese captured 10 palas, three of which were burned, 17 galvetas, seven of which were burned, 10 parangues and minor vessels. 243 guns were captured, along with a considerable amount of material meant to equip ships. On December 1, the Portuguese occupied the fort of Rarim, which surrendered without a fight and a further 18 vessels were captured. After both the forts of Rarim and Tiracol were garrisoned, all remaining Portuguese forces returned to Goa on December 20.

As a result of Portuguese campaigning, the capability of the Bhonsles to harass Goa or its shipping was considerably diminished, while Portuguese territory was expanded north to as far as Rarim. When the Bhonsles again attempted to attack Portuguese shipping two years later, the Viceroy also captured Neutim.

== See also ==
- Alorna Fort
- Siege of Alorna
- Marquis of Alorna
