= Battle of Vasai =

1739 conflict between the Portuguese and Maratha Empires in India

Battle of Vasai (Bassein)
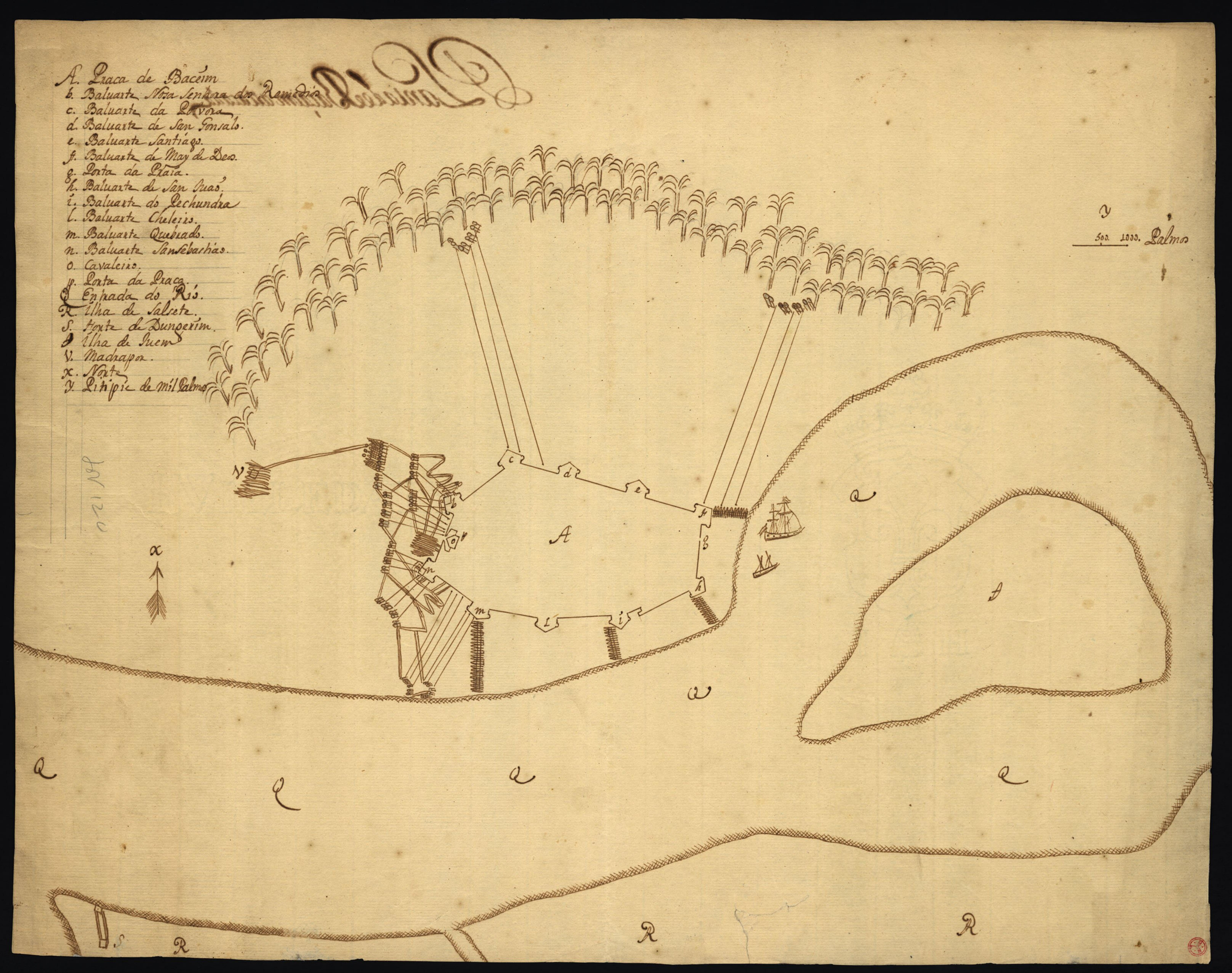
- Portuguese map of the Maratha siege of Vasai, 1739
Date	17 February 1739 – 16 May 1739 (2 months, 4 weeks and 1 day)
Location	Vasai and surrounding area 19°19′50″N 72°48′51″E
Result	Maratha victory
Territorial changes	Baçaim ceded to the Maratha Empire

Belligerents
Maratha Empire; Pindaris	Portuguese Empire

Commanders and leaders
Chimaji Appa; Malhar Rao Holkar; Ranojirao Shinde; Khanderao Holkar	Captain Caetano de Souza Pereira (surrendered)

Strength
Maratha Empire: 40,000 infantry; 25,000 cavalry; 4,000 soldiers trained in laying mines; 5,000 camels; 50 war elephants	Unknown

Casualties and losses
Unknown	800 killed wounded

The Battle of Vasai or the Battle of Bassein was fought between the Maratha Empire and the Portuguese rulers of Vasai (Portuguese, Baçaim; English, Bassein), a town near Mumbai (Bombay) in the Konkan region of the present-day state of Maharashtra, India. The Marathas were led by Chimaji Appa, a brother of Peshwa Baji Rao I.

== Background ==
By 1736, the Portuguese had been at work for four years constructing the fortress of Thana, and aside from the long delays, the workers were unpaid and unfed. Bhavangad Fort was built by Shrimant Chimaji Appa Peshave to capture the Fort Bassein by Maratha Army, and most of the secret activities were done at Bhavangad fort.

After the war of 1737-39, Chimaji Appa and his Maratha soldiers took the church bells from Vasai as memorabilia and installed them in various Hindu temples of Maharashtra; some of the bells they installed in the Khandoba Temple of Jejuri and the Tulja Bhavani Temple of Osmanabad. These church bells are still present in these temples. The garrison of Baçaim, thanks to the reinforcements received from Goa, was of about 1,200 soldiers, among Portuguese and Indian auxiliaries.

== Siege of Baçaim ==
The siege of Baçaim began on 17 February 1739. All the Portuguese outposts around the major fort at Baçaim had been taken. Their supply routes from the north and south had been blocked, and with the English manning the seas, even that route was unreliable. Chimaji Appa arrived at Bhadrapur near Baçaim in February 1739. According to a Portuguese account, his forces numbered 40,000 infantry, 25,000 cavalry, and around 4,000 soldiers trained in laying mines. Furthermore, he had 5,000 camels and 50 elephants. More joined from Salsette in the following days, increasing the total Maratha troops amassed to take Baçaim to close to 100,000. The Portuguese, alarmed at this threat, decided to vacate Bandra, Versova, and Dongri so as to better defend Baçaim. As per the orders of the Portuguese Viceroy, the Count of Sandomil, only Baçaim, Damão, Diu, and Karanja (Uran) were to be defended. These were duly fortified. In March 1739, Manaji Angre attacked Uran and captured it from the Portuguese. This was followed by easy Maratha victories at Bandra, Versova and Dharavi, which the Portuguese garrison had vacated. Manaji Angre joined Chimaji Appa at Vasai after this. Thus, by April 1739, the noose around Baçaim had further tightened.

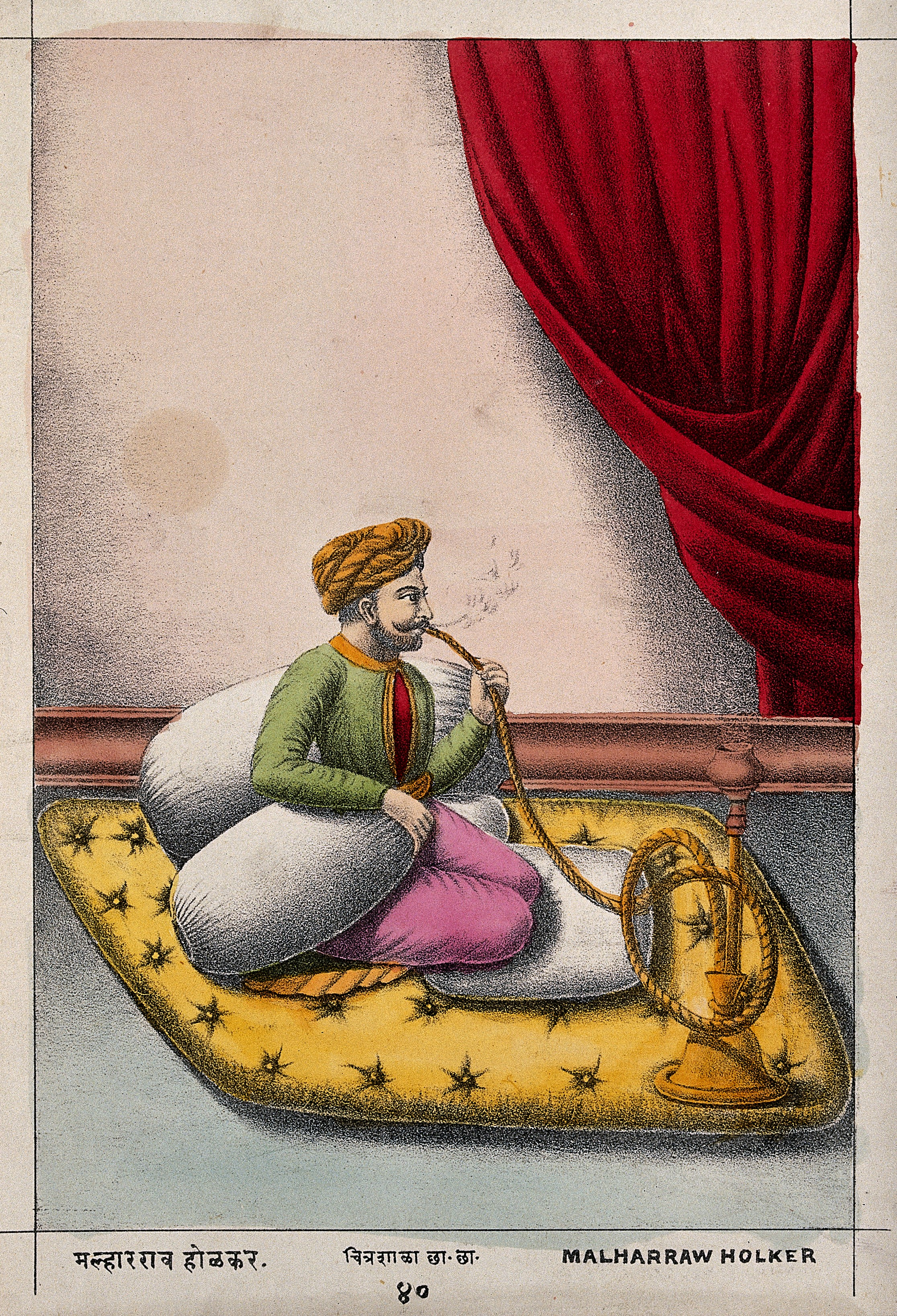
Malhar Rao Holkar I

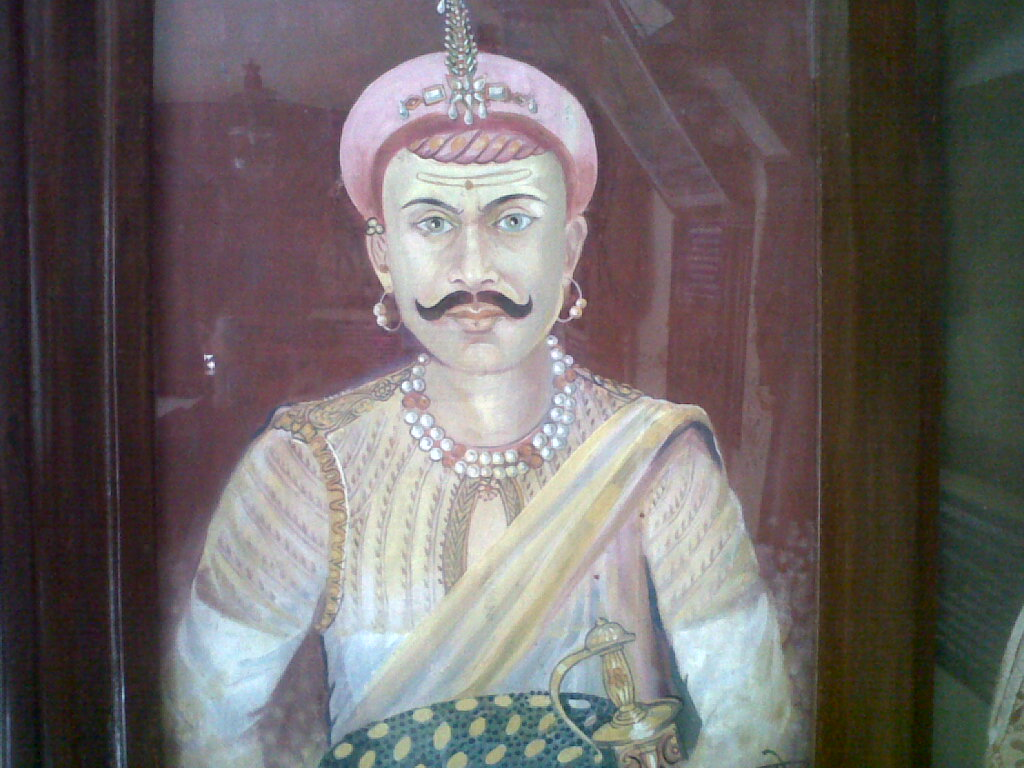
A painting of Chimaji Ballal Peshwa near Parvati temple in Pune

Within the fort, the towers of São Sebastião and Nossa Senhora dos Remédios faced the Marathas at Bhadrapur. The barracks and everything else were inside, with the main gate facing the Vasai Creek. Appa began the siege on 1 May 1739 by laying 10 mines next to the walls near the tower of Remédios. Maratha soldiers charged into the breach caused by exploding four of them. Almost immediately, they came under fire from Portuguese guns and muskets. Appa, Malhar Rao Holkar, Ranoji Shinde and Manaji Angre goaded their contingents to scale the walls throughout the day. Next day, on 2 May, the towers of São Sebastião and Remédios were repeatedly attacked. More mines were set off during the day, causing large breaches in the walls between the two towers. Around 4,000 Maratha soldiers tried to enter the fort, but the Portuguese opposition was fierce. They also managed to defend the two towers by lighting firewood. On 3 May, the tower of São Sebastião was demolished by a Maratha mine. Maratha armies could now easily march into the fort, without the fear of being fired upon from the tower. The encirclement and defeat of the Portuguese was complete. Appa decided to settle the war at this point by sending an envoy to the Portuguese. In his letter, he warned them that the entire garrison would be slaughtered and the fort levelled if the war continued. The Portuguese commander in charge of the fort duly surrendered on 16 May 1739. The Maratha general ordered that the rest of the garrison should leave Baçaim with unfurled colours, muskets at the shoulder and playing drums, and that they be transported by sea to Mumbai (Bombay). On 23 May 1739, the saffron flag flew atop Baçaim.

== See also ==
- First Anglo-Maratha War
- Novas Conquistas
- Portuguese India
- Siege of Alorna
- Siege of Tiracol
