= Mughal invasions of Konkan (1684) =

1684 battle in India

Mughal invasion of Konkan (1684)
- Part of Deccan wars
| Date | 20 August 1683 – 24 May 1684 (9 months and 4 days) |
| Location | Konkan region, specifically South Konkan and North Konkan. |
| Result | Maratha victory |

Belligerents
| Maratha Empire | Mughal Empire |

Commanders and leaders
| Sambhaji; Hambirrao Mohite | Mu'azzam (WIA); Shahabuddin Khan |

Units involved
| | 40,000–45,000 cavalry 60,000 infantry 1,900 elephants 2,000 camels 5,000 guards of Hasan Ali |

Strength
| Exact number unknown, estimates indicate ~ 10,000–15,000 | 100,000–110,000 soldiers |

Casualties and losses
| Negligible | ~60,000 killed |

Mughal invasion of Konkan (1684) was a part of the Deccan wars. It was a military campaign launched by the Mughal Emperor Aurangzeb to capture the Konkan region from the Maratha emperor Sambhaji. The Mughal forces were led by Shah Alam I (Muazzam) and Shahbuddin Khan. The harsh climate and Maratha guerrilla tactics caused the numerically stronger Mughal troops to go into a slow retreat. The Maratha army suffered small losses in this unsuccessful campaign of the Mughal Empire.

Most of the troops died due to famine, drought, food poisoning, and a general lack of food. Nearly one third of the total troops were killed by Marathas under Sambhaji at the narrow passage of Ramghat. The remaining few thousand troops including Shah Alam were rescued by the Siddis and Ruhulla Khan and then joined Aurangzeb's camp.

== Background ==
Aurangzeb tried attacking the Maratha Empire from all directions, intending to use the Mughal numerical superiority to his advantage. Sambhaji had prepared well for the invasions and the Maratha forces promptly engaged the numerically larger Mughal army in several small battles using guerrilla warfare tactics. However, Sambhaji and his generals attacked and defeated the Mughal generals whenever they got an opportunity to lure the Mughal generals into decisive battles in the Maratha stronghold territories. Sambhaji had devised a strategy of minimising the losses on his side. If there was an opportunity then the Maratha army attacked decisively, however, if the Mughals were too strong in numbers, then the Marathas used to retreat. This proved to be a very effective strategy as Aurangzeb's generals were not able capture the Maratha territories for three years continuously. Aurangzeb then decided to attack the Maratha capital Raigad Fort directly from the north and south. He made a pincer attempt to surround the Maratha Capital that led to Mughal invasions of Konkan (1684).

== Preparations ==
In late 1683, Sambhaji thrashed and put pressure on the Portuguese in Goa and Bombay-Bassein, in a campaign known as Sambhaji's invasion of Goa (1683). Goa was almost captured and the viceroy of Goa asked Aurangzeb for immediate assistance. At this same time Aurangzeb devised a pincer attempt to attack the Maratha capital at Raigad Fort from the North and the South. He sent his general Shahbuddin Khan to attack Raigad through North Konkan from his position in Gujarat Subah. The other Mughal flank was led by Prince Muazzam with a 100,000 strong force. His army consisted of 40,000 horsemen, 60,000 footmen, 1900 elephants and 2000 camels.

Both Sambhaji and the viceroy had information that Mughal prince Muazzam was coming to the aid of Portuguese with a 100,000 strong force. Sambhaji decided to make use of his army against the Portuguese before the Mughal army could reach South Konkan. Sambhaji stormed the colony taking its forts. On 11 December 1683, Sambhaji's army attacked Salsette and Bardez. Sambhaji had 6000 cavalry and 8-10 thousand infantries with him. The Marathas plundered Bardesh and town of Madgaon. The Portuguese successfully defended only Aguada, Reis-Magos, Raitur and Murgaon forts against the onslaught of the Marathas. All the other forts were captured by the Marathas. The owner of the French factory in Surat, Francois Martin, has described the poor condition of the Portuguese, he said the viceroy was completely dependent on Mughal aid now.

After having captured Salsette and Bardesh (Bardez) the Marathas were eager to take the island of Goa as well. The viceroy feared that if the things remained unchanged, Sambhaji would soon conquer the island of Goa. He went to the body of St. Francis Xavier, lying in the Bom Jesus church in old Goa, and placed his sceptre on the dead saint's hand and prayed for his grace to avert the Maratha threat. When Sambhaji learnt of Muazzam's approach from Ramghat which is 30 miles from Goa, he withdrew all his forces to Raigad on 2 January 1684. Sambhaji didn't want to get trapped between Portuguese and Mughal armies, hence he decided to adopt a defensive strategy. Orleans said that "Sambhaji didn't consider himself strong enough to resist such huge numbers and thought of securing safety by a masterly retreat which he affected so cleverly that he retired to his fastness before the Moghuls could engage him". Sambhaji retreated home before the Mughals could attack him. After returning home, Sambhaji learnt of the huge force of Muazzam, and hence to face the large Mughal army, Sambhaji started to increase the strength of his army.

== Events in the campaign ==
On 28 December 1683, Muazzam burned down the towns of Kudal and Bande. On 15 January 1684, he burned down Dicholi; the forces of Muazzam destroyed temples and looted the port of Vengurla. The Mughal forces faced severe food shortages, his soldiers were starving, hence he ordered Khairatkhan and Yakutkhan of Surat to send him food supplies. Muazzam asked for permission to pass his ships carrying food which were granted by Portuguese. The Portuguese sent a lawyer to Muazzam requesting Alam not to retreat from Konkan and keep fighting against Sambhaji, since the Portuguese had lost more than 20 lakh rupees due to the war against the Marathas. Still, he was demanding this same amount and 600 horses and the Konkan territory from Banda to Mirjan. However, no such deal took place in reality because the ships carrying food supplies sent to Muazzam did not reach Goa; this was because different Maratha sea-fort commanders attacked and captured them when they received information about these ships. Only a few ships escaped but they did not carry enough food supplies. Muazzam was ordered to return from Konkan. Muazzam decided to leave Konkan before the onset of the monsoons. On their way back, the Mughal army suffered much (while going through Ramghat) due to the scarcity of food, constant attacks by the Marathas, and disease. When Muazzam crossed the Ramghat, he was left with little cavalry, the Marathas were constantly attacking him from all sides using guerrilla tactics. Mughal sardar Bahadur Khan met Muazzam and provided him with equipment and force. In April–May 1684, Muazzam stayed at shakes/sheks village near Bijapur, in the month of June he reached the banks of the river Bhima where he had a battle against 5000 Maratha soldiers and was injured during battle. The expedition of Konkan by Muazzam was a big failure as the Mughals lost 60,000 soldiers, hundreds of camels, artillery pieces, lakhs of rupees, with virtually no gains.

Skirmishes around Raigad

After the 1684 monsoons, Aurangzeb's other general, Shahbuddin Khan, directly attacked the Maratha capital, Raigad. Maratha commanders successfully defended Raigad. Aurangzeb sent Khan Jehan to help, but Hambirrao Mohite, commander-in-chief of the Maratha army, defeated him in a fierce battle at Patadi. Another division of the Maratha army attacked Shahbuddin Khan at Pachad, inflicting heavy losses on the Mughal army. Though Shahbuddin Khan was repulsed, skirmishes and raids around Raigad continued throughout the year.
