= Mormugão fort =

Fort in Goa, India

Coordinates: 15.3997°N 73.7914°E

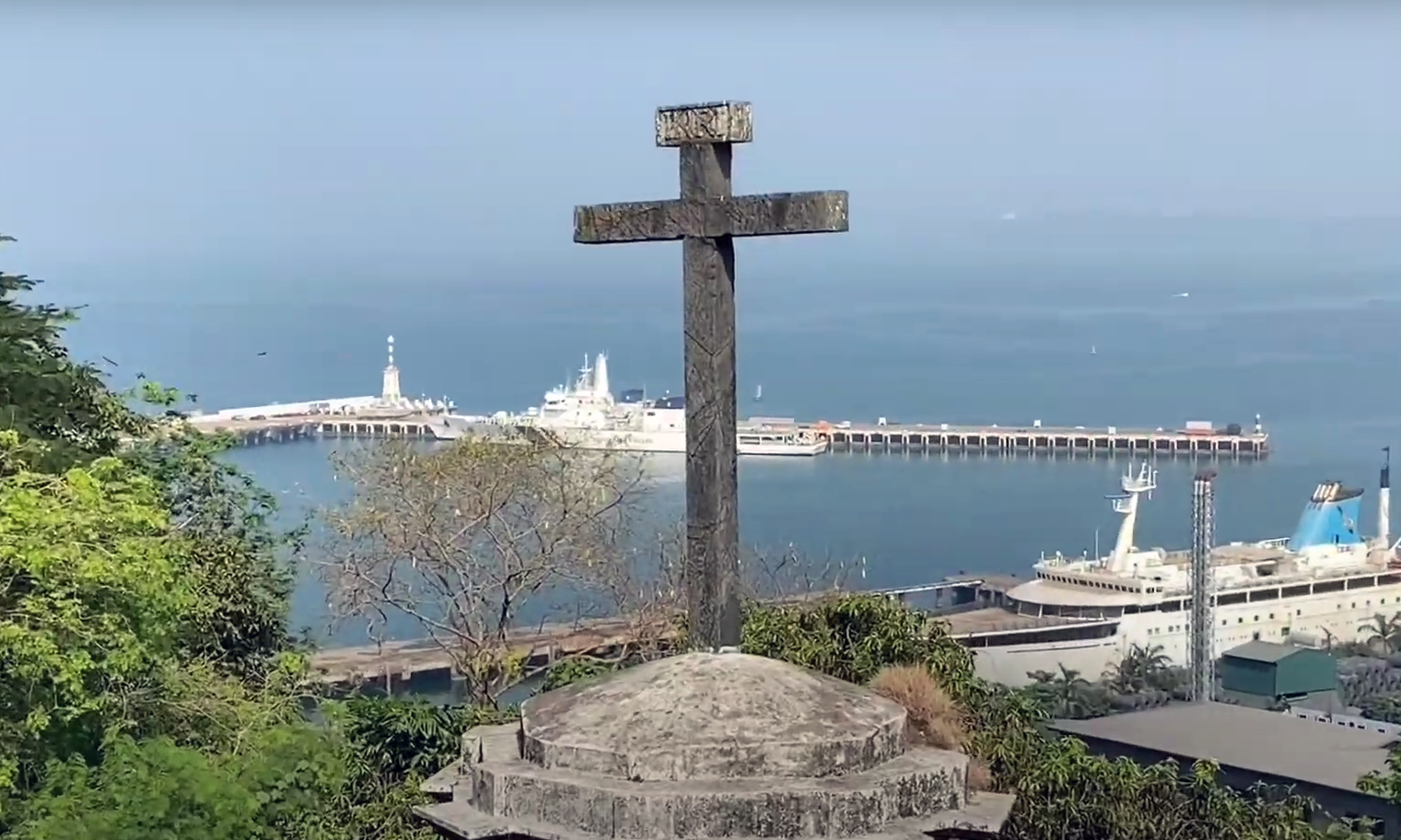
Cross at Mormugao Fort

The Mormugão fort was located on the southern tip of the mouth of the Zuari river in Mormugao in the state of Goa on the west coast of India.

== History ==
This fortification was built on the order of the Viceroy of the Portuguese State of India, Dom Francisco da Gama, Fourth Count of Vidigueira, during his second government, for the defense of South Goa bar, which was then capital of the state of India (Estado da Índia).

His works began in 1624, according to ancient epigraphic inscriptions. In that century, due to the continuous plagues and attacks that racked the old city of Goa, the Viceroys considered the transfer the capital of Portuguese India (Índia Portuguesa) to Mormugao, for what purpose some buildings were erected. The high project costs led to its abandonment though.

The area was lost in 1737, during the invasion of the Marathas. In the nineteenth century, Nova Goa (or Panjim, as it is currently known) became the new capital.

Presently, the old fort is severely ruined.

== Characteristics ==
The fort had a rectangular plan, with dimensions of 330 by 88 meters, with the vertices balurtes (pentagonal at the land side and quadrangular on the sea-side). Inside stood the service buildings. A "V" curtain with a circular tower at the angle, defended the fort's access to the harbor.

== Bibliography ==
- AZEVEDO, Carlos de. A Arte de Goa, Damão e Diu. Lisboa: Comissão Executiva do V Centenário do Nascimento de Vasco da Gama (1469-1969), 1970. plantas, fotos p/b.

== See also ==
- Império português
