= Novas Conquistas =

- Region
- Goa at its height under Portuguese occupation. The Novas Conquistas are highlighted in cream.
- Country: Portuguese Empire
- Region: Estado da India
- Historical Province: Goa; Província do Norte
- Concelhos: Goa: 7 Província do Norte: 8
- Parishes: 25
- Capital: Nova Goa (Pangim)

The Novas Conquistas or "New Conquests" are a group of seven concelhos (municipalities) of Goa and Damaon, officially known as Portuguese India. They were added into Goa in the 18th century AD, comparatively later than the three original concelhos that make up the Velhas Conquistas, or "Old Conquests".

The seven concelhos of the Novas Conquistas are:

- Pernem,
- Bicholim,
- Sattari,
- Antruz (Ponda),
- Sanguem (modern-day Sanguem and Dharbandora),
- Quepem and
- Canacona.

Silvassa was a newly-acquired area in the Província do Norte.

In writing postal addresses, the Novas Conquistas were abbreviated "N.C."

== History ==
In December 1764, Hyder Ali, the king of Mysore, sent his general, Fazalullah Khan, northward into Soonda via Bednur, where landowners who resisted his administration met severe retribution. Fearing capture, the Raja of Soonda fled to Goa and surrendered his territories below the Western Ghats to the Portuguese in exchange for sanctuary and a fixed annual stipend. The lower territories including the port of Sadashivgad, near Karwar, were absorbed into the Kingdom of Mysore.

The new areas granted by the Raja of Soonda were incorporated into Portuguese Goa.

Later, in 1783, the Kingdom of Sawantwadi needed Portuguese help against Kolhapur and so ceded some parts of Pernem, Bicholim and Sattari to Portugal. The remaining part of Pernem (including Terekhol Fort) was ceded in 1788 and thus came to be known as the Novas Conquistas (New Conquests). Unlike the Velhas Conquistas, these areas remained predominantly Hindu, as the Portuguese lost their zeal of Christianization.

== Demographics ==
Velhas Conquistas has a considerably higher Catholic population as compared to Novas Conquistas. This is primarily attributed to the impacts of early Catholic missionary work, and the ensuing Goan Inquisition, both of which faded in relevance and strength towards the late 1700s when the new territories were incorporated into Portuguese India.

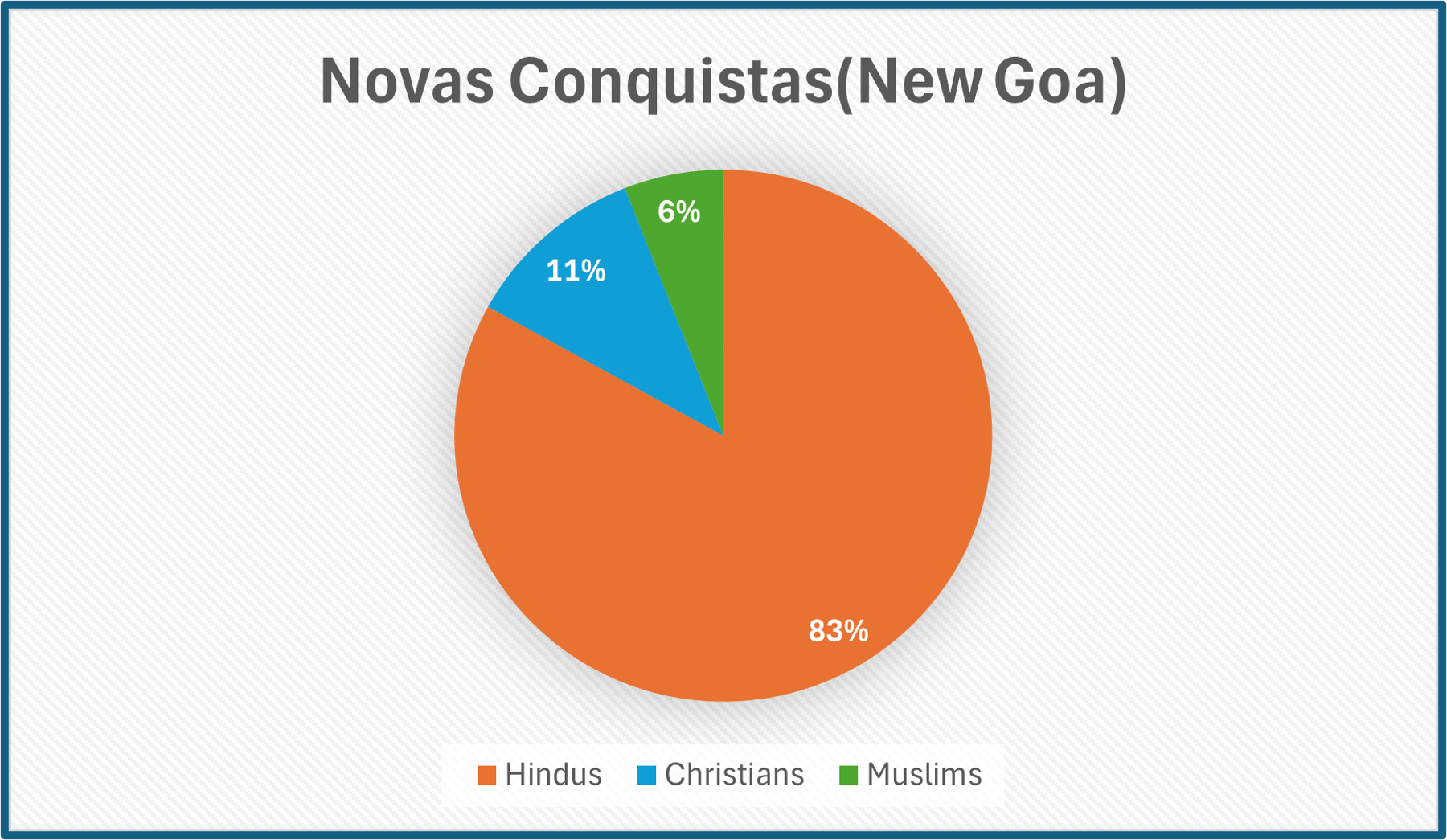
Religious Demographics according to the 2011 Census

== Conflicts ==
Some lands in what would become the Novas Conquistas region had been acquired by the Portuguese prior to the 1783 treaty.

- Siege of Tiracol (1746)
- Siege of Alorna (1746)

== See also ==
- Velhas Conquistas
