= Durbhat =

Durbhat is a village in the Ponda taluka (sub-district) of Goa.

== Area, population ==
As of 2001 the India census, Durbhat in Ponda taluka has an area of 579 hectares, a total of 771 households, a population of 3,443 (comprising 1700 males and 1,743 females) with an under-six years population of 303 (comprising 148 boys and 155 girls). In the Indian census, its location code is 626856.

== Location ==
Durbhat is located in the south-western part of Ponda taluka. Quela is to the north and Borim to its south.

It lies approx 9 km from the sub-district (taluka) headquarters of Ponda town, and approx 33 km away from the district North Goa headquarters of Panaji or Panjim via NH748.

== Local jurisdiction ==
Durbhat lies under the Durbhat gram panchayat. Its location code in the Indian census is 626856.
