= Alorna Fort =

Coordinates: 15.700°N 73.905°E

Fort Santa Cruz de Alorna also known as Halarn Fort or Alorna Fort, is one of the oldest forts in Goa. It is situated 30 kilometers from the town of Mapusa. It was constructed by the Bhonsles of Sawantwadi in the 17th century, to defend against the Maratha attacks.

As of 2010, the fort was in poor condition, and plans to restore it were under consideration.
