= Sawantwadi State =

Princely state of India

Savantvadi State
- 1554–1948
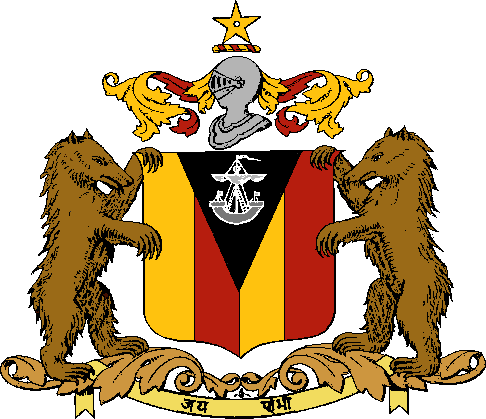
- Flag Coat of arms

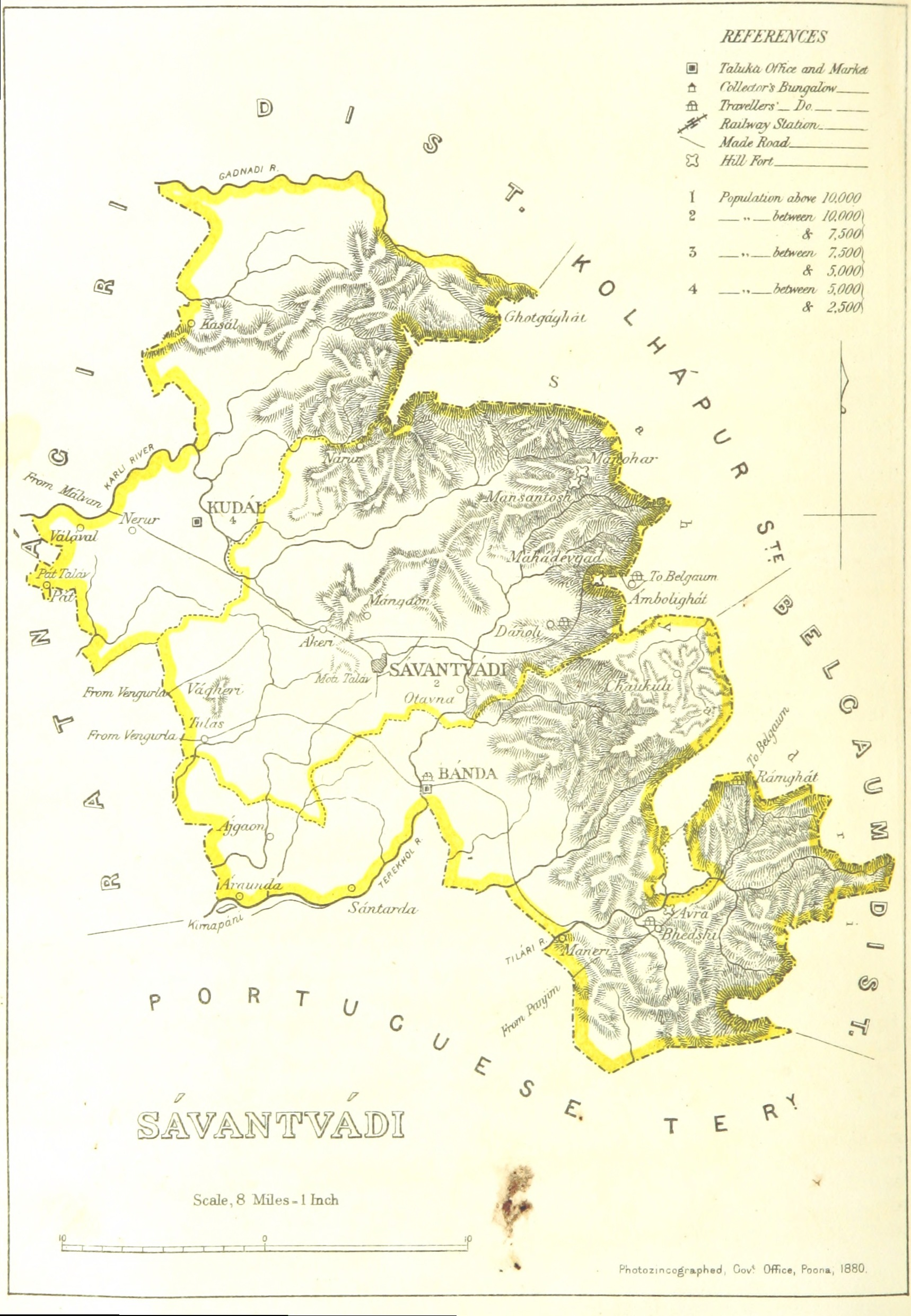
- Sawantwadi 1896
- History
  - Established by Mang Sawant: 1554
  - Joined the Indian Union: 1948

Area
- 1931: 2,396 km^{2} (925 sq mi)

Population
  - 1931: 250,589
Preceded by	Succeeded by
Bijapur Sultanate	Bombay State
- Today part of: Maharashtra, India

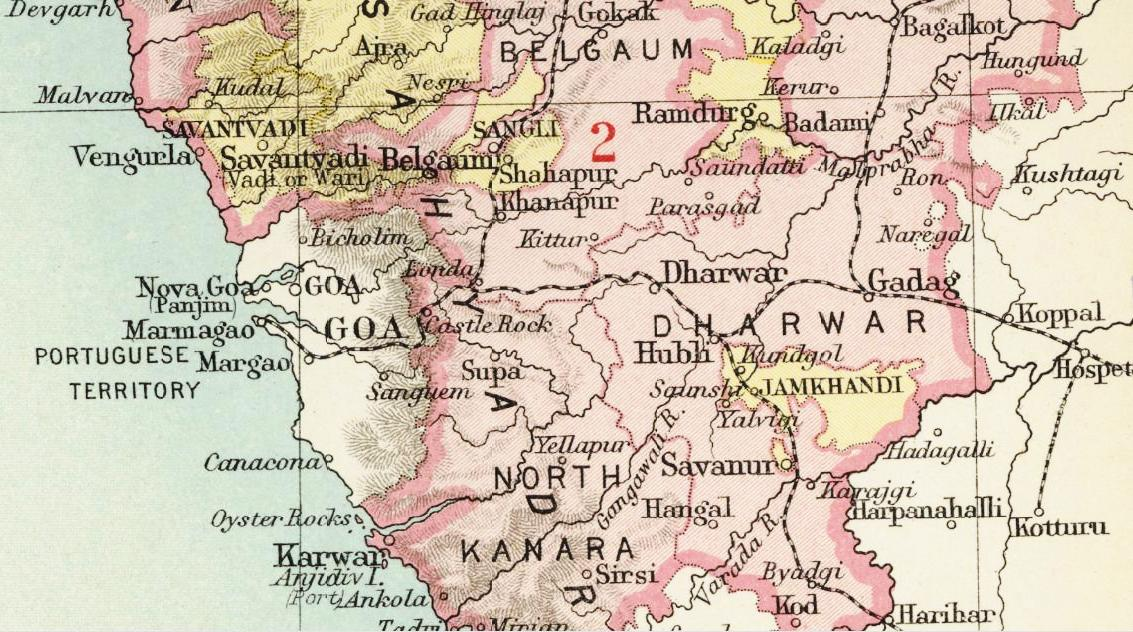
Savantvadi State in the Imperial Gazetteer of India

Savantvadi State, also spelt Sawantwadi, ruled by the Sawant Bhonsale dynasty was one of the non-salute Maratha princely states during the British Raj. It was the only state belonging to the Kolaba Agency under the Bombay Presidency, which became later part of the Deccan States Agency. Its capital was at Sawantwadi, in the present-day Sindhudurg district of Maharashtra.

Sawantvadi State measured 438 square kilometers in area. According to the 1931 census, the population was 250,589. The official language of the inhabitants of the state was Marathi, while the local language is Malvani

== History ==
The coastline of Sawantwadi was strategically important especially for the Europeans. The political boundaries of Sawantwadi fluctuated between the northern latitudes of 17°N and 15 °S and 73° E and the seacoast from Masure till the mouth of the river Kolwal. The northern boundary of Sawantwadi is formed by the river Gadnadi which rises near the Ghotge ghat and meets the sea near Sarjekot.

The Sawant's, in the early seventeenth century, were the feudal holders of the hereditary right Deshmukh under the rule of Adil Shahi. The Marathas under the legendary Chhatrapati Shivaji Maharaj and Portuguese at Goa were the other two important powers which came into contact with Sawantwadi.

Mang Sawant was founder of Sawant Bhonsle dynasty. He was followed by Khem Sawant I in 1627. He was rewarded Jagir from the Bijapur's Adilshah and later made himself independent, followed by Lakham Sawant the first. It was only during the period of Lakham Sawant I that the Sawant family, with Hodawade as the headquarters, came into political prominence.

After his demise, Khem Sawant II succeeded him.

Khem Sawant II established his capital at Sundarwadi (now Sawantwadi), a hamlet of the village Charathe which later came to be known as Sawantwadi as the rulers were known as Sawants. He helped Mughals against Chhatrapati Shivaji Maharaj and in return got more territory from them. Khem Savant was succeeded by his son Som Savant and ruled for only 18 months and later his brother, Lakham Savant succeeded him.

Lakham Sawant didn't abide by the terms of the treaty (1659), betrayed Chhatrapati Shivaji Maharaj by joining Bijapur Sultanate. In 1660, Shivaji sent one of his earliest followers, Baji Phasalkar. He fought a drawn battle with Lakham's commander Kay Savant. In 1662, Shivaji Maharaj defeated Lakham. In the later history, Lakham Sawant was slain in battle with Chhatrapati Shivaji Maharaj.

In 1812, due to the effects piracy originating in the ports of Sawantwadi had on commerce, the British forced Phond Savant III to cede Vengurla to them and to commit to no longer maintaining a force of war ships. Soon thereafter Phond Savant III died and was succeeded by the eight year old Khem Savant IV, whose reign multiple rebellions breaking out. The internal turmoil led to Khem Savant IV agreeing to hand over power to the British in 1838. The British suppressed two further rebellions, in 1839 and 1844. Sawantwadi was restored, in the form of a princely state, in 1861.

Pancham Khemraj alias Bapusaheb Maharaj was crowned on 29 October 1924.In his small tenure from 1924 to 1937. He surrendered to the British Empire and betrayed the independence revolutionaries.

He was succeeded by his son Shivramraje Bhonsale, but he being a minor at the time, Bapusaheb’s wife Queen Parvatidevi looked after the State as a Regent.After Rajyabhishek Shivramraje Bhonsale ruled for Some months and merge State into Union of India.

== Timeline ==
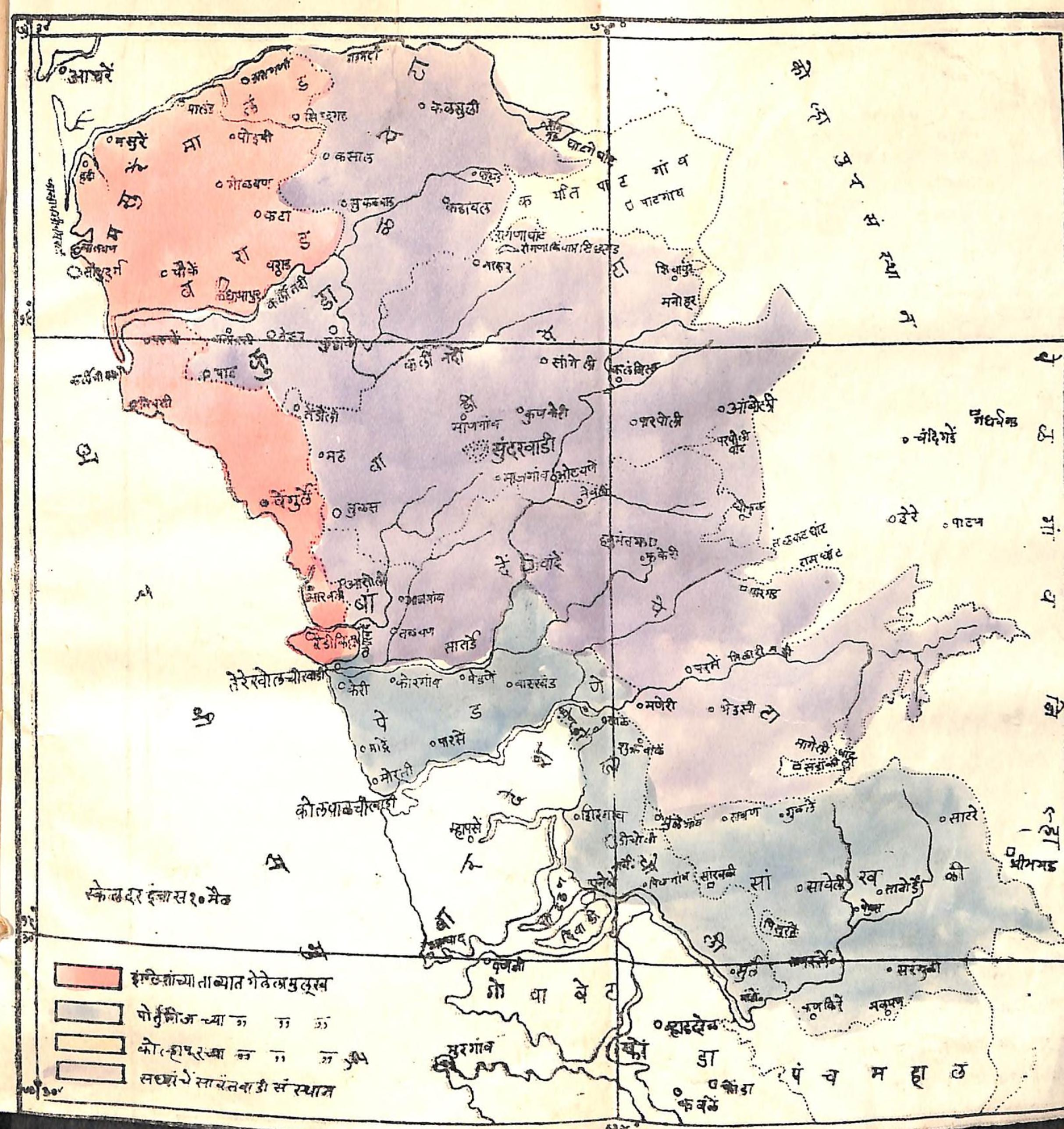
Map of Sawantwadi State, 1911 (in red Brish taken part blue portugal taken part)

- 1675 – Feb 1709 Khem Savant II Bhonsle (b. 16.. – d. 1709) - He helped Mughals against Shivaji and in return got more territory from them.
- Feb 1709 – 2 Jan 1738 Phond Savant II Bhonsle (b. 1667 – d. 1738)
- 2 Jan 1738 – 1755 Ramachandra Savant I Bhonsle (b. 1712 – d. 1755)
- 2 Jan 1738 – 1753 Jayram Sawant Bhonsle – Regent (d. 1753)
- 1755 – 1763 Khem Savant III Bhonsle (b. 1749 – d. 1803)
- 1755 – 1763 Soubhagyavati Janaki Bai Bhonsle (f) – Regent
- 1763 – 6 Oct 1803 Khem Savant III (s.a.) - He received RajaBahadur Title from Delhi Badshah Shah Alam II on recommendation of Jivbadada Kerkar and Mahadaji Shinde.
- 6 Oct 1803 – 1805 Rani Lakshmi Bai (f) – Regent (b. 17.. – d. 1807)
- 1805 – 1807 Ramachandra Savant II "Bhau Saheb" (b. 17.. – d. 1809)
- 1807 – 1808 Phond Savant II (d. 1808)
- 1808 – 3 Oct 1812 Phond Savant III (b. 17.. – d. 1812)
- 1807 – 1808 Rani Durga Bai (f) – Regent (d. 1819) (1st time)
- 3 Oct 1812 – 1867 Khem Savant IV "Bapu Saheb" (b. 1804 – d. 1867)
- 3 Oct 1812 – 28 Dec 1818 Rani Durga Bai (f) – Regent (s.a.) (2nd time)
- 28 Dec 1818 – 11 Feb 1823 Regents
  - – Rani Savitri Bai Raje (f)
  - – Rani Narmada Bai (f) (b. 1783 – d. 1849)
- 1867 – 7 Mar 1869 Phond Savant IV "Bapu Saheb" (b. 1828 – d. 1869)
- 7 Mar 1869 – Dec 1899 Raghunath Savant "Baba Saheb" (b. 1862 – d. 1899)
  - 7 Mar 1869 – c.1880 .... -Regent
- Dec 1899 – 23 Apr 1913 Shriram Savant "Aba Saheb" (b. 1871 – d. 1913)
  - Dec 1899 – 17 Jun 1900 .... -Regent
- 24 Apr 1913 – 4 Jul 1937 Khem Savant V "Bapu Saheb" (b. 1897 – d. 1937) (from 4 Jun 1934, Sir Khem Savant V)
- (Eldest Son of Khem Savant went to England Radhakrishna Samant (Savant)) lost claim to throne
- 24 Apr 1913 – 29 Oct 1924 Rani Gajara Bai Raje (f) – Regent (b. 1887 – d. 19..)
- 4 Jul 1937 – 15 Aug 1947 Shivramraje Savant Bhonsle (b. 1927 – d. 1995)
- 4 Jul 1937 – 12 May 1947 Rani Parvati Bai Raje (f) – Regent (b. 1907 – d. 1961)

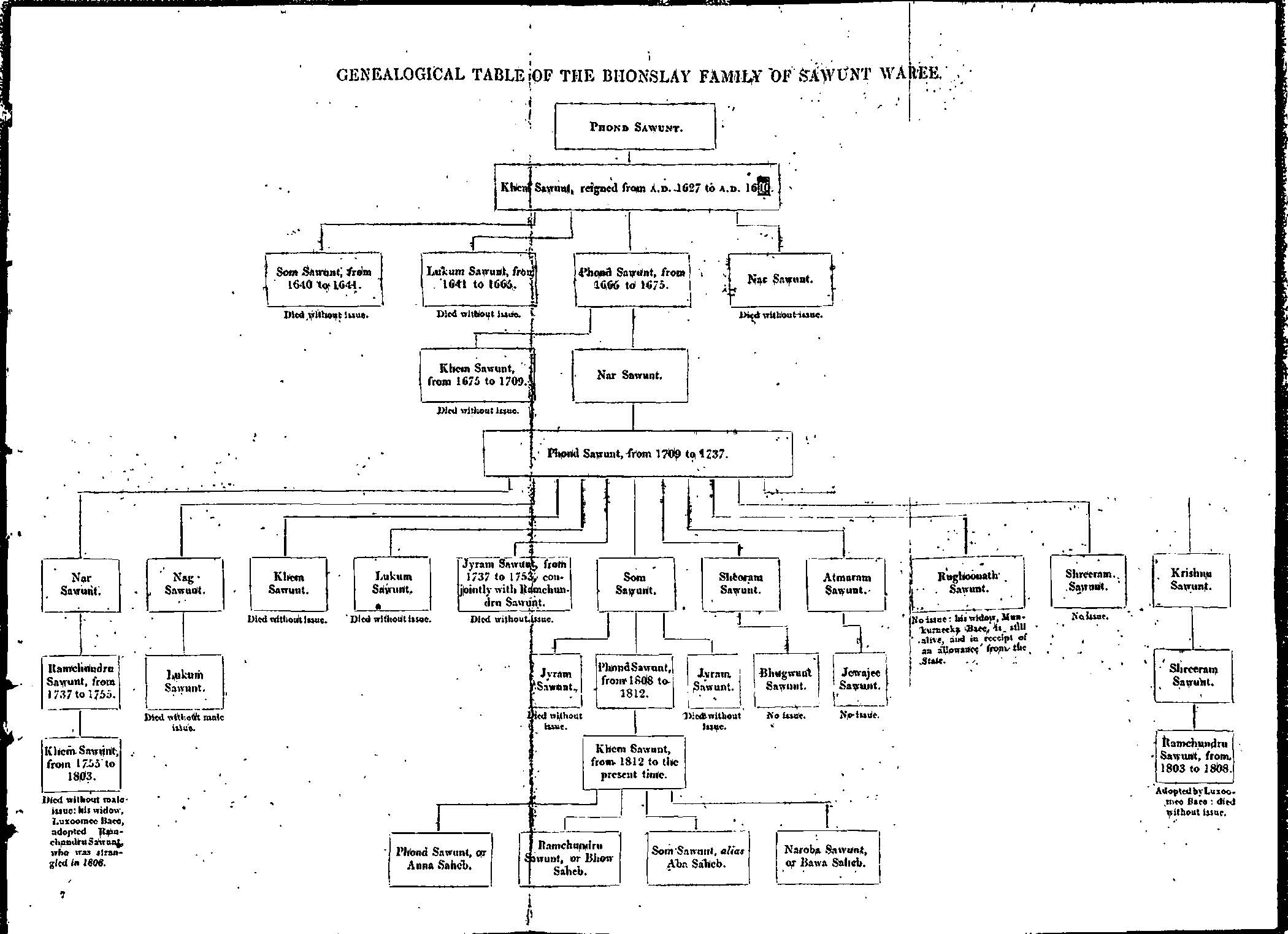
Genealogy of Sawants of Wadi

== See also ==
- Maratha
- Maratha Empire
- List of Maratha dynasties and states
- Maratha titles
- Political integration of India
