= List of peers and fidalgos in Portuguese India =

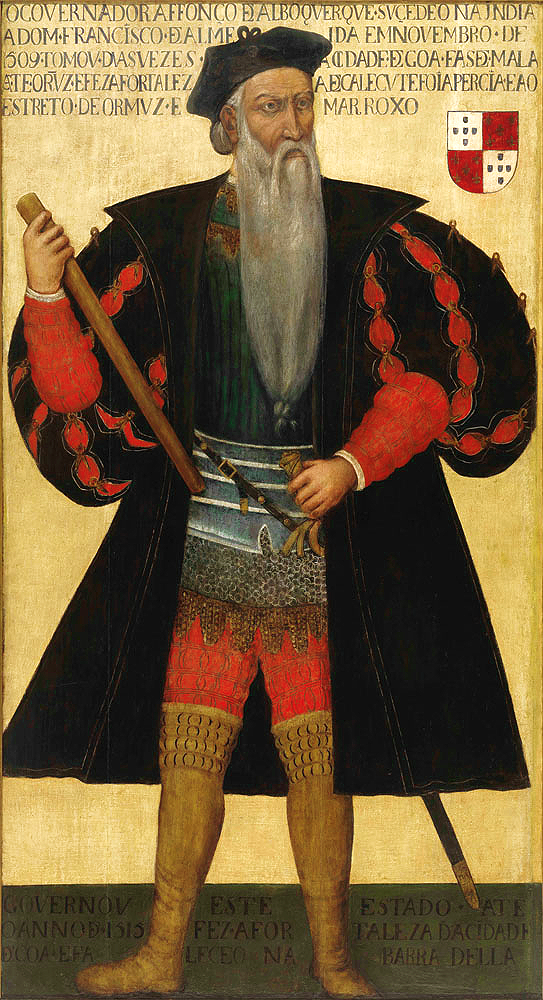
Afonso de Albuquerque, Duke of Goa

The Kingdom of Portugal gave titles and created coats of arms for notable persons in Portuguese Goa, including native Goans. However, these titles lost their recognition after the 5 October 1910 revolution and start of the First Portuguese Republic in 1910.

These families formed the highest echelons of the nobility of Portuguese India which was a mix of Gaunkars and warriros who founded villages, lawyers, doctors and industrialists who founded its largest enterprises.

== Peerages ==
=== Peers ===
Portuguese and Mestico

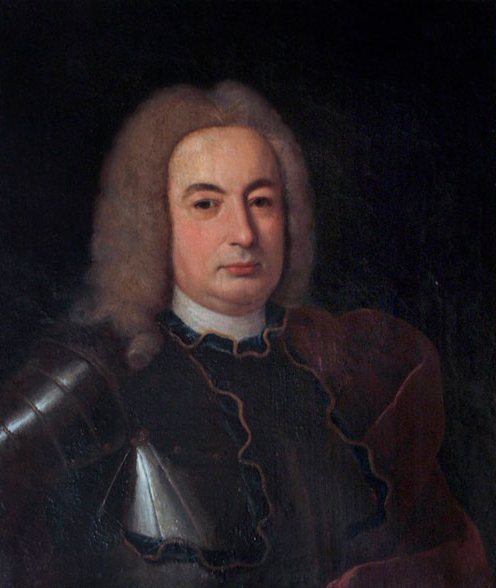
Pedro Miguel de Almeida Portugal e Vasconcelos, 1st Marquis of Alorna

- Marquis of Alorna and Count of Coculim. These hereditary titles are currently held by the present Marquis of Fronteira. Count of Coculim is a Portuguese title of nobility created by King Afonso VI of Portugal, by a decree of 3 May 1666, in favour of D. Francisco Mascarenhas, a Portuguese nobleman. Marquis of Alorna was a Portuguese title of nobility granted, on 9 November 1748, by King John V of Portugal, to D. Pedro Miguel de Almeida Portugal e Vasconcelos, 3rd Count of Assumar and 44th viceroy of India.Originally, on 24 March 1744, the title was granted to him as Marquis of Castelo Novo but, due to his victories in India, it was changed, in 1748, to Marquis of Alorna, a town in Portuguese India after capturing the Alorna Fort. While the Count of Cuncolim received the villages of Assolna, Velim, Cuncolim, Veroda and Ambelim as a grant from the king and this continued till the Liberation of Goa, the Marquess of Alorna was an honorific title for the capture of the Fort, Alorna never became a countship. In the Code of Communidades of 1961 in independent India Alorna had a communidade. Similar to Mayem, Goa (Abolition of Proprietorships, Titles and Grants of Lands) Act, 2014 was to solve the land title issue of Cuncolim, yet villagers are still awaiting a solution The connection of these two titles is that they are now held by the same person.

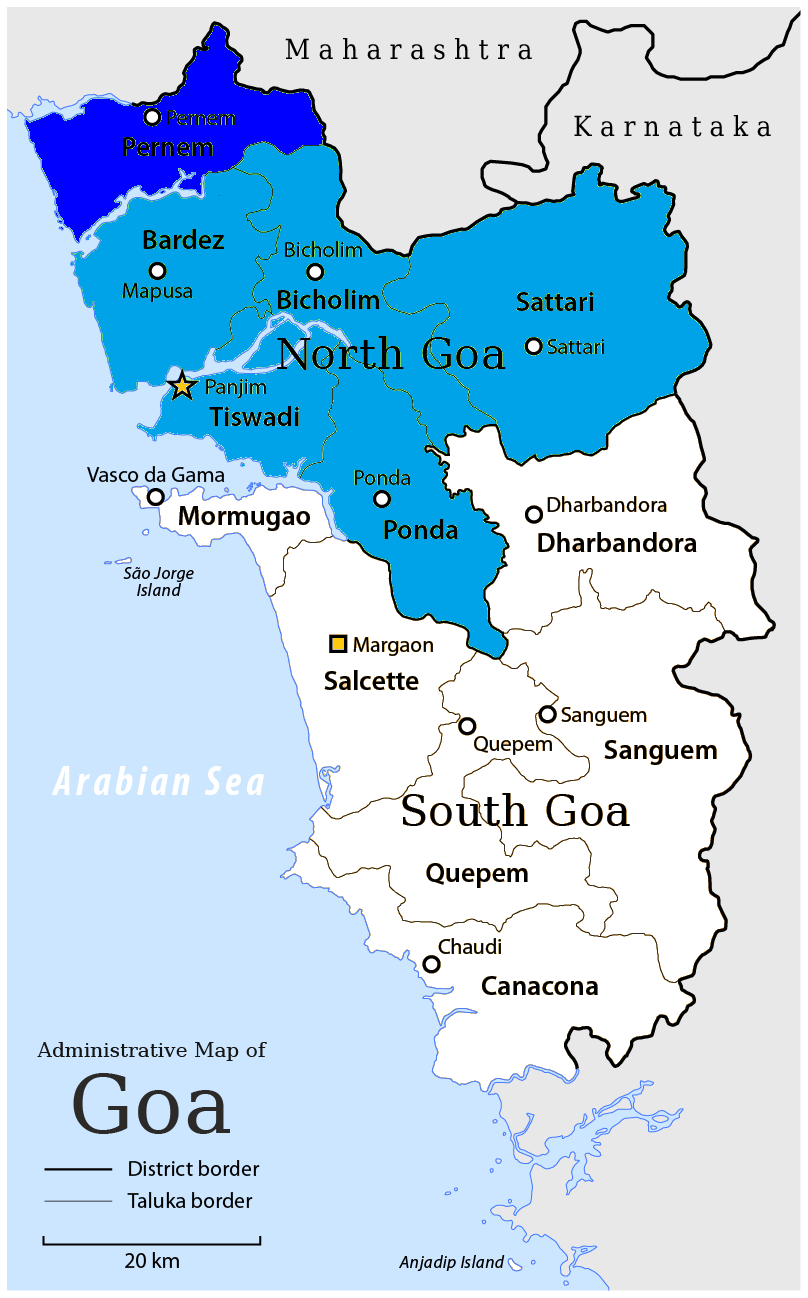
Pernem Taluka in dark blue, the Viscondado

- Count of Nova Goa. This hereditary title was originally bestowed on Luis Caetano de Castro e Almeida Pimentel de Sequeira e Abreu (1840—1914) of Panjim in 1864 by Luis I of Portugal. The current holder of the title is his descendant Luis Eduardo de Mendia de Castro (1943—).
- Count of Mayem. This is a hereditary title given to the Noronha family of Mayem in Bicholim taluka. The Noronha family were descendants of Francisco de Távora, 1st Count of Alvor who was the governor of Portuguese India, the same family of the infamous Távora affair. The first Count of Maem was Jose Joaquim Noronha, a mestico, the grandson of Diogo da Costa Ataide Teive, one of the Maquinez, and owners of the famous Maquinez Palace, who purchased Mayem, the palace was donated by the Conde de Mayem and served as Goa Medical College at Panaji. Jose Joaquim Noronha, bequeathed half of his lands to his daughter's son Eurico da Silva Noronha, son of Francisco António Wolfgango da Silva, director of Goa Medical College. He could not pass his title as within his lifetime Portugal had abolished the monarchy. Their lands were designated as evacuee property in 1967 which was challenged by the family. After decades of court battles with the Government of Goa, the government passed the Goa (Abolition of proprietorships, titles and grants of lands) bill, 2014 primarily to solve the Mayem property issue. The heirs, some of whom have now acquired Overseas Citizenship of India and others who are Indian citizens, are continuing to challenge this bill over loss of their rights.
- Viscount and Count of Ribandar and Baron of Cumbarjua The Viscount and Count of Ribandar are noble title created by King Carlos I of Portugal , by Decree of September 19, 1890 , in favor of Joaquim Mourão Garcês Palha, formerly the 1st Viscount of Ribandar. The title of Viscount was created by King Luís I of Portugal , by Decree of June 25, 1880. for Joaquim Mourão Garcês Palha grandson of Joaquim Mourão Garcez Palha the 48th Governor of Macau ( 1825–1827 ) and the 90th Governor of Portuguese India ( 1843–1844 ) at Ribandar in Tiswadi.The Baron of Cumbarjua was a title created by King Luís I of Portugal, by decree of November 21, 1865 , in favor of Ludovico Xavier Garcês Palha (1814-1871), son of Joaquim Mourão Garcês Palha , governor of India and Macau.The Garcez Palha family were mestico, Tomás de Aquino Mourão Garcês Palha , 2nd Baron of Combarjua was a pioneer in Konkani and Marathi in the Devnagiri script, popularizing it and ensuring its resilience, unheard of for a noble whose ancestors came from Portugal. He held the role of Inspector of Government Primary School and published a Marathi Monthly

==== Goans ====
- Baron and Viscount of Perném. He, along with the Viscount of Bardez, is the highest-ranked patrilineally non-European noble in European history and the only one with an extant line. The title of Baron was given to the ruler of Pernem, Vassudeva Deshprabhu, by decree of 14/6 /1878 (Luís I of Portugal). His son Atmaram Vassudeva Deshprabhu, Commander of the Order of Christ (1891), was elevated to Viscount by decree of 19/8/1893 (Carlos I of Portugal). There is succession from the first Viscount to the present day. MLA Jitendra Deshprabhu and Pernem Municipal Council member and politician Vasudeva Deshprabhu are direct descendants. Jitendra Deshprabhu had the title re-affirmed by Duarte Pio, Duke of Braganza heir to the throne of Portugal in the 21st Century. While this was also given to Viscount Deshprabhu in his life (comparable to the British Life peer as the Portuguese royal family made few hereditary peerages) his heir Jitendra had it renewed by Duarte Pio, Duke of Braganza in the 21st century. Deshprabhu was one of the largest landowners of Portuguese India and part of their land was acquired for Manohar International Airport
- Baron Dempo. Created in 1873 for Krishna Govinda Rayú Sinai Dempo, 1st Baron Dempo, a wealthy zamindar and trader. His descendant Vaikuntrao Dempo was the last member of parliament in Portugal prior to the independence of Portuguese India. His brother Vasantrao S. Dempo was the founder of Dempo Mining Corporation and owner of football club Dempo S.C.. While the family is extant, the title is considered as extinct because it was given for his lifetime and was not renewed. The Dempo family continues to be involved in politics and business, and is considered Goa's wealthiest family. The Dempo family was among the 10 richest in India post independence.
- Baron Kenkre of Calapor. given to a wealthy capitalist and trader named Purshottam Sinai Kenkre, Hindu zamindar, residing in Diu, Knight of the Order of the Tower and Sword, by decree of 3/2/1853. Decree of 26/6/1873 Luis I, in his life. While the family is extant, the title is considered as extinct because it was given for his lifetime and was not renewed.

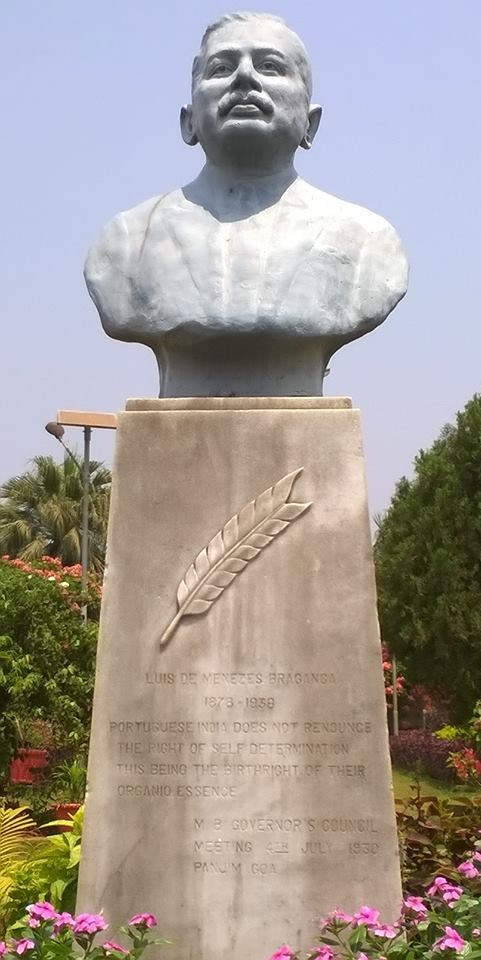
Bust of Luis de Menezes Bragança, nobleman and freedom fighter

=== Extinct ===
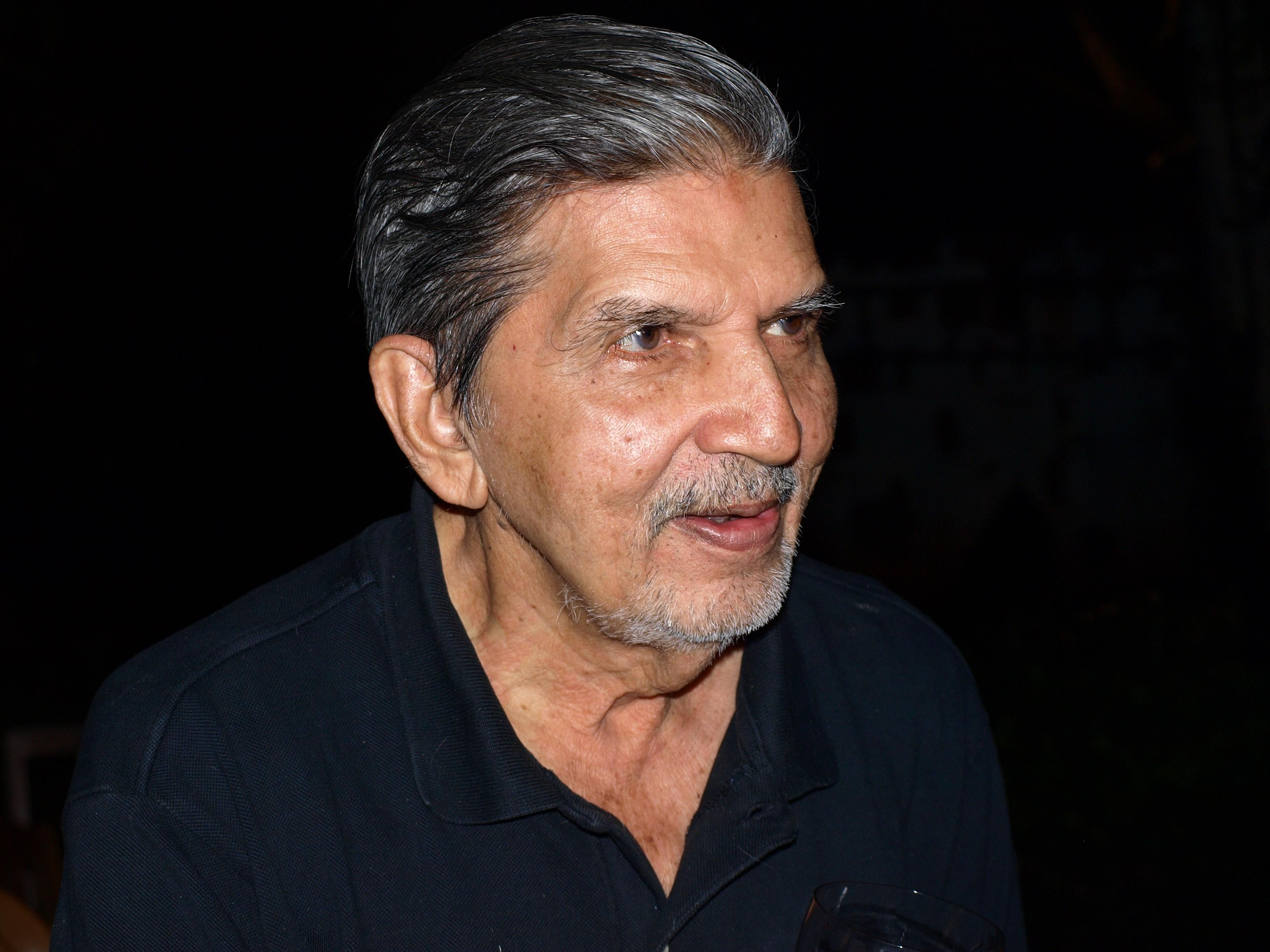
Famous cartoonist from the noble Miranda family, Mario Miranda

- Duke of Goa. This hereditary title was given to Afonso de Albuquerque by Manuel I of Portugal following the Portuguese conquest of Goa.
- Viscount of Bardez. Inácio Caetano de Carvalho, lawyer and journalist, was born in Camurlim, Bardez, on 9/5/1843 and died on 9/15/1907, of an ancient Brahmin family from Salcette. At the beginning of the 19th century, when a plague broke out, the Carvalho family settled in the beginning of the 19th century in the village of Camurlim. He was the son of Joaquim Salvador de Carvalho, one of the most eminent jurists of his time. He obtained a lawyer's license at just 20 years old, occupying various positions in the local administration and in Diu. As a journalist, he was editor-in-chief of the newspaper O Mensageiro and later of O Oriente, a newspaper that later merged into Gazeta de Bardez. In 1877 he founded A Pátria, which for many years occupied a distinguished place in the local press. As a politician, he was head of a large party that, for many years, dominated the councils of Bardez, affiliated to the “dynastic-left” association, founded in Portugal by José Vicente de Freitas; and then in the Regenerator Party, then under the leadership of António de Serpa Pimentel. On 8/19/1893 he was awarded the title of Viscount of Bardez.

== Fidalgos ==
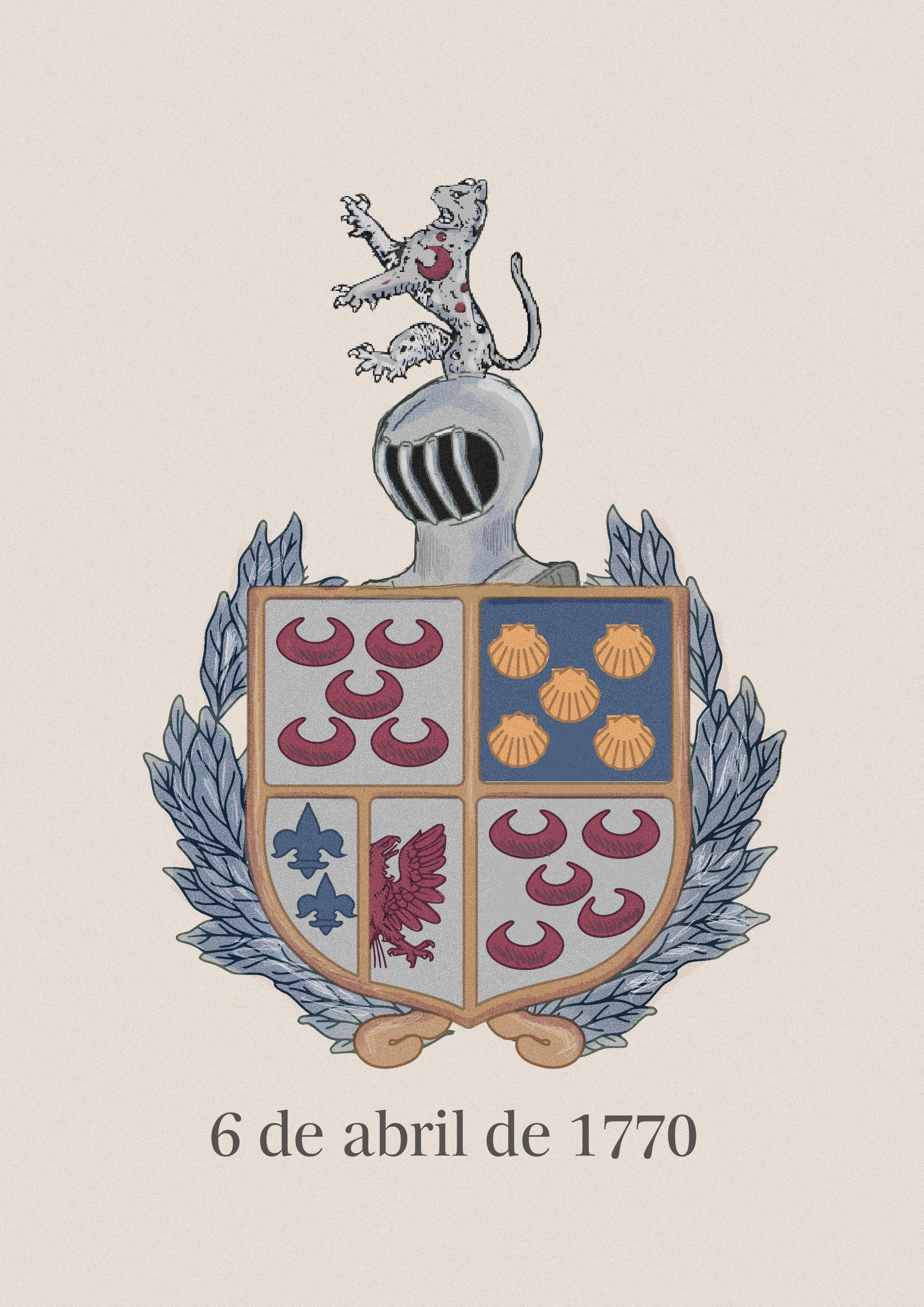
Coat of Arms of the Pintos, awarded by the King of Portugal in 1770, 17 years before their infamous revolt for independence

The fidalgo is a Portuguese noble distinction granted to certain Goans who were lawyers, merchants and diplomats. These Christians were considered to be included in the Portuguese nobility. The fidalgos detailed here are only those whose distinction was hereditary. This distinction ranks above baronet as they form part of the nobility similar to the Spanish Hidalgo (nobility) while the baronet is a commoner despite it being a hereditary title. However fidalgo ranks below Baron.

=== Extant ===
- Alvares of Margao. Created in 1798 for Pedro Antonio Alvares, doctor and descendant of Vincent Alvares, a medical practitioner and chemist of John V of Portugal. His descendant José Filipe Alvares assisted Swami Vivekananda in studying Christianity during the latter's visit to Goa. These arms and position of nobility could be bequeathed to their heirs.
- Pinto of Candolim. Created in 1770 twice for both António and Ignacio Pinto individually. The Pintos descended from the Brahmin Salvador Pinto alias Santu Sinay, a historic figure in the village of Candolim. They were a military family who initially supported the Portuguese government before participating in the Conspiracy of the Pintos. The Pinto family were defeated in their plans, convicted of treason and had their noble privileges revoked. The family went on to assist in the French Revolution and fight for the Maratha Empire before returning to Goa. The house of the Pintos today stands as Bosio Hospital in Candolim which was donated to he Sisters of Charity of Sts. Bartolomea Capitanio and Vincenza Gerosa by heirs of Ignacio Pinto in Pinto Vaddo.
- Monteiro of Candolim. Created in 1802 for Brahmin José João Monteiro, a military officer from Candolim. His descendants are Dr. Gustavo Monteiro, the benefactor of Dr. Gustavo Monteiro Football Ground of Candolim and Chico Monteiro, a freedom fighter.

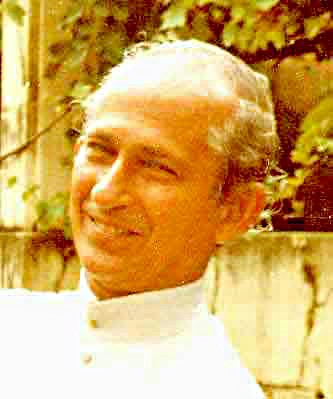
Famous priest and freedom fighter from the noble Monteiro family, Fr. Chico Monteiro

- Bragança of Chandor. Created in 1877 for Chardo nobleman Francisco Xavier de Bragança of Chandor. His heir Luís de Menezes Bragança was a prominent journalist, writer, politician and anti-colonial activist. During his lifetime, Menezes Bragança was widely hailed around the Lusosphere (Portuguese speaking world) as "O Maior de todos" ("The Greatest of all Goans") and in the Indian mainland as "The Tilak of Goa". At his 25th death anniversary in 1963, the Instituto Vasco da Gama was renamed by its management to Institute Menezes Braganza in honour of his memory. These arms and position of nobility could be bequeathed to their heirs.
- Miranda of Loutolim. Created in 1872 for Constâncio do Rosário de Miranda of Loutolim. After serving as a soldier in the Portuguese Army, his father Pedro Joaquim de Miranda was the Fiscal Administrator of the Novas Conquistas. One of his descendants was the cartoonist Mario Miranda. These arms and position of nobility could be bequeathed to their heirs.
