= Abbé Faria =

Portuguese Catholic priest and pioneer of hypnotism (1756–1819)

Abbé (Abbot) Faria
- Abade José Custódio de Faria
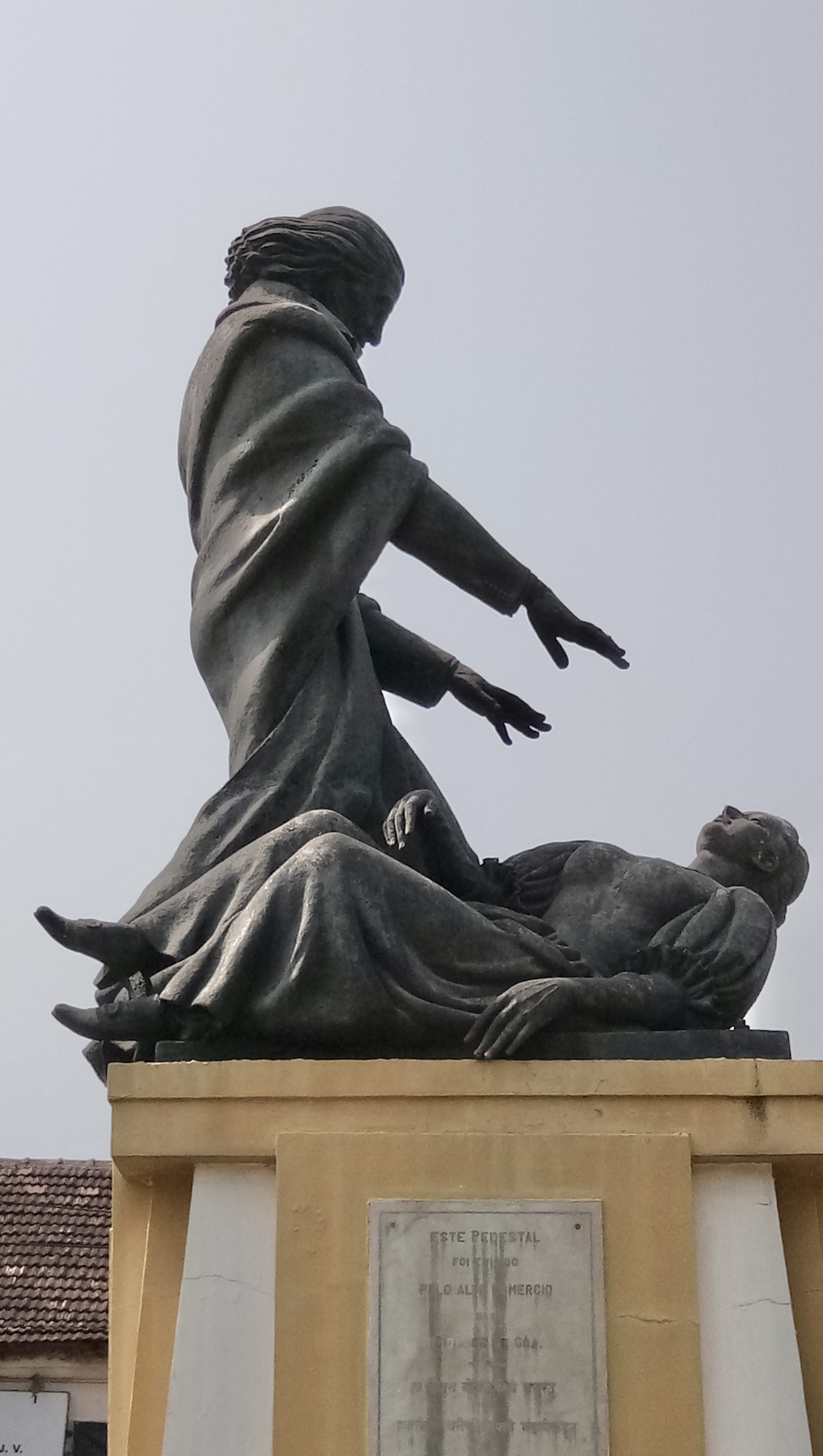
- Statue of Faria next to the Old Secretariat in Panaji, India.
- Born: José Custódio de Faria; 31 May 1756; Candolim, Goa, Portuguese India
- Died: 20 September 1819 (aged 63); Montmartre, Paris, Kingdom of France
- Occupation: Catholic priest
- Known for: Scientific study of hypnotism
- Notable work: Da Causa do Sono Lúcido no Estudo da Natureza do Homem
- Website: abbefaria.com

Abbé Faria (Portuguese: Abade Faria) (born José Custódio de Faria; 31 May 1756 – 20 September 1819) was a Goan Catholic priest from Portuguese India who was one of the pioneers of the scientific study of hypnotism, following on from the work of Franz Mesmer. Unlike Mesmer, who claimed that hypnosis was mediated by "animal magnetism", Faria understood that it worked purely by the power of suggestion. In the early 19th century, Abbé Faria introduced oriental hypnosis to Paris.

Faria was one of the first to depart from the theory of the "magnetic fluid", to place in relief the importance of suggestion, and to demonstrate the existence of "autosuggestion"; he also established that what he termed nervous sleep belongs to the natural order. From his earliest magnetizing séances, in 1814, he boldly developed his doctrine. Nothing comes from the magnetizer; everything comes from the subject and takes place in his imagination generated from within the mind. Magnetism is only a form of sleep. Although of the moral order, the magnetic action is often aided by physical, or rather by physiological, means–fixedness of look and cerebral fatigue.

Faria changed the terminology of mesmerism. Previously, the focus was on the "concentration" of the subject. In Faria's terminology the operator became "the concentrator" and somnambulism was viewed as a lucid sleep. The method of hypnosis used by Faria is command, following expectancy. The theory of Abbé Faria is now known as Fariism. Later, Ambroise-Auguste Liébeault (1864–1904), the founder of the Nancy School, and Émile Coué (1857–1926), father of applied conditioning, developed the theory of suggestion and autosuggestion and began using them as therapeutic tools. Johannes Schultz developed these theories as Autogenic training.

== Early life ==
José Custódio de Faria was born in Candolim, Bardes concelho in the erstwhile territory of Portuguese Goa, on 31 May 1756. He was the son of Caetano Vitorino de Faria of Colvale, and Rosa Maria de Sousa of Candolim. He also had an adopted sister, Catarina who was an orphan. Caetano was in turn a descendant of Anantha Shenoy, a Goud Saraswat Brahmin (GSB), village clerk and Patil of the same village who converted to Christianity in 1583. He was a Goan Catholic of the Bamonn caste, and was also of partial European and African maternal descent.

Since his parents fought all the time, they decided to separate and obtained the Church's dispensation. Caetano Vitorino joined the seminary to study for the priesthood (he had already taken lower orders before his marriage). Rosa Maria became a nun, joining the St. Monica Convent in Old Goa.

== Move to Lisbon ==
Faria's father, Caetano, had great ambition for himself and his son. Hence, Faria reached Lisbon, Kingdom of Portugal on, 23 December 1771 with his father at the age of 15. After a year they managed to convince the King of Portugal, Joseph I, to send them to Rome for Faria Sr. to earn a doctorate in theology, and the son to pursue his studies for the priesthood.

Eventually, the son too earned his doctorate, dedicating his doctoral thesis to the Portuguese Queen, Mary I of Portugal, and another study, on the Holy Spirit to the Pope. Apparently the pope was sufficiently impressed to invite José Custódio to preach a sermon in the Sistine Chapel, which he himself attended.

On his return to Lisbon, the Queen was informed by the Nuncio of the Pope's honour to Faria Jr. So, she too invited the young priest to preach to her as well, in her chapel. But Faria, climbing the pulpit, and seeing the august assembly felt tongue tied. At that moment his father, who sat below the pulpit, whispered to him in Konkani: Hi sogli baji; cator re baji (they are all vegetables, cut the vegetables). Jolted, the son lost his fear and preached fluently.

Faria Jr., from then on, often wondered how a mere phrase from his father could alter his state of mind so radically as to wipe off his stage fright in a second. The question would have far reaching consequences in his life.

== Participation in Pinto Revolt ==
Faria was implicated in the Conspiracy of the Pintos during 1787, and left for France in 1788. He stayed in Paris residing at Rue de Ponceau.

== Later years in France ==
In Paris, Faria became a leader of one of the revolutionary battalions in 1795, taking command of one of the sections of the infamous 10 of the Vendémiaire, which attacked the French Convention, taking an active part in its fall. As a result, he established links with individuals like Chateaubriand, the Marquis de Custine. He was also a friend of Armand-Marie-Jacques de Chastenet, Marques of Puységur (a disciple of Franz Anton Mesmer), to whom he dedicated his book Causas do Sono Lúcido ("On the Causes of Lucid Sleep").

In 1811, he was appointed Professor of Philosophy at the University of France at Nîmes, and was elected member of the Société Medicale de Marseille at Marseille.

In 1813, Faria realised that animal magnetism was gaining importance in Paris and returned to Paris and started promoting a new doctrine. He provoked unending controversies with his work Da Causa do Sono Lúcido no Estudo da Natureza do Homem (On the cause of Lucid Sleep in the Study of the Nature of Man), published in Paris in 1819 and was soon accused of being a charlatan.

He retired as chaplain to an obscure religious establishment, and died of a stroke in Paris on 30 September 1819. He left behind no addresses and his grave remains unmarked and unknown, somewhere in Montmartre.

== Legacy ==
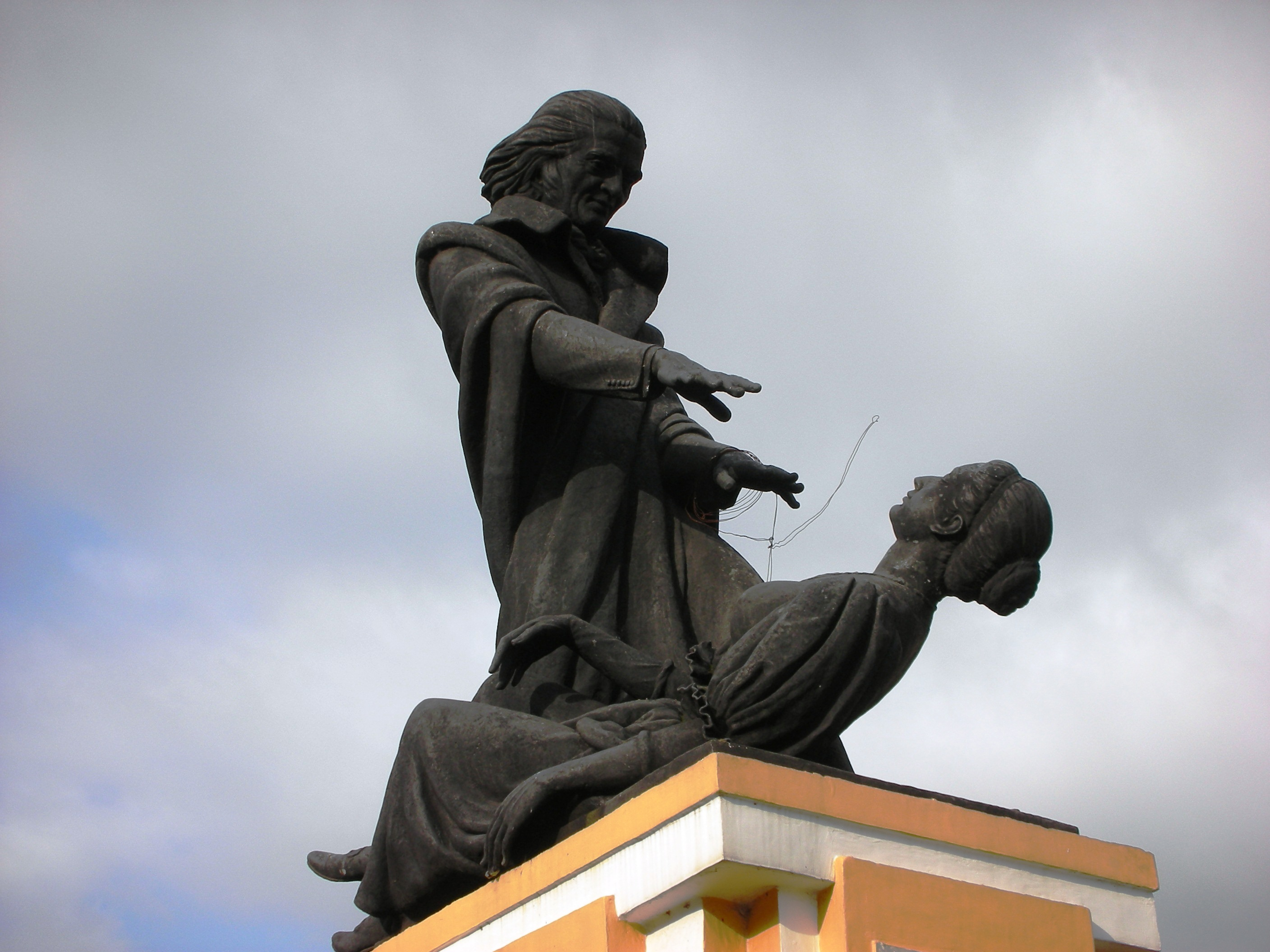
Statue of Faria at Panjim, Goa

There is a bronze statue of Faria trying to hypnotise a woman in central Panjim, Goa, India (next to the former Government Secretariat or Idalcão palace). It was sculpted in 1945 by Ramchandra Pandurang Kamat or earlier by Constâncio Fernandes. Portugal commemorated the 250th anniversary of Faria's birth in May 2006 by releasing a postcard and stamp (featuring his statue in Panjim, India. A street in the Areeiro zone of Lisbon is also named in his honour.

An authentic caricature of him is preserved in the National Library of Paris. A prominent thoroughfare in the city of Margao in Goa, India is named Rua Abade Faria (Abbé Faria Street) in his honour. On this street, there was an educational institution called Instituto Abade Faria which imparted Portuguese language secondary school education known as "Lyceum studies", consisting of First Year to Fifth Year classes. It ceased to function after the liberation of Goa.

French novelist Alexandre Dumas' 1844 novel The Count of Monte Cristo features a prominent character named Abbé Faria, who is imprisoned in the Château d'If in solitary confinement. Faria exercises a certain self-control while held there, but apart from this the character does not have a strong resemblance to his historical counterpart.

Abbé Faria, a play by Indian writer Asif Currimbhoy, dramatizes Faria's life and views as a revolutionary priest and premier hypnotist. It was published by Writers Workshop. Jaime Valfredo Rangel presented a paper in tribute of his 200th birth anniversary to the Governor of Portuguese India, Paulo Bernard Guedes.

The Institute of Clinical Hypnosis and Counselling was established in the Indian state of Kerala as a memorial to Faria.

Kator Re Bhaji, is a play that was written and directed by Isabel de Santa Rita Vas and performed by the Mustard Seed Art Company, an Indian theatre troupe from Goa, in celebration of the 250th anniversary of Faria's birth. Laurent Carrer included the first English translation of Faria's single tome, originally written in French as De la cause du sommeil lucide ou Etude de la nature de l’homme (On the Cause of Lucid Sleep or Study On The Nature of Man) in his 2004 José Custódio de Faria: Hypnotist, Priest and Revolutionary.
