= Currimbhoy =

Currimbhoy is a surname. Notable people with the surname include:

- Asif Ebrahim Currimbhoy (1928–1994), Indian playwright and businessman
- Sir Fazalbhoy Currimbhoy Ebrahim, 1st Baronet of Pabaney Villa (1840–1924), Indian businessman
