= Cadeia do Aljube =

Former prison in Lisbon, Portugal

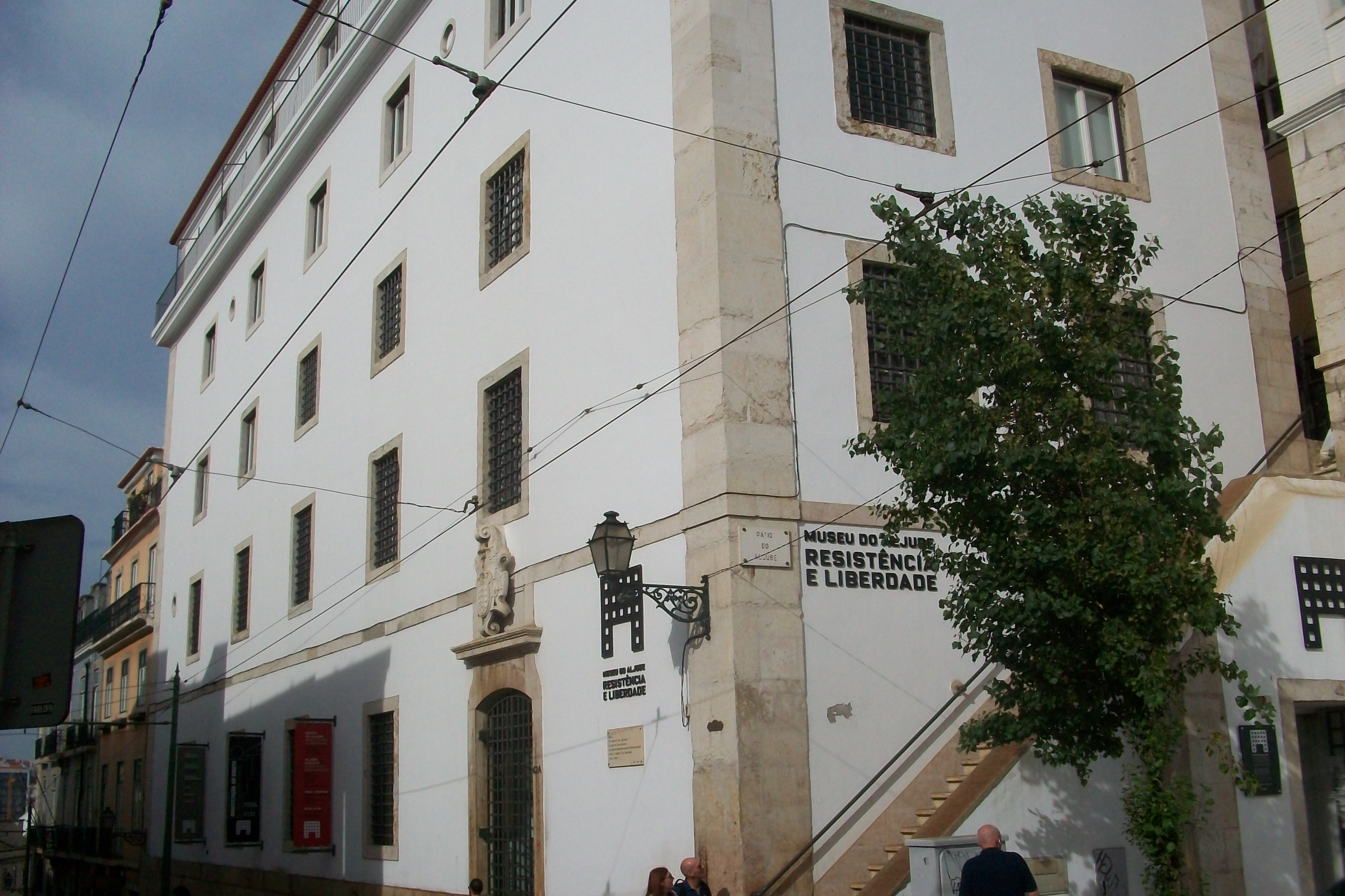
- The building today as a museum

General information
- Location: 42 Rua de Augusto Rosa, Lisbon (Portugal)
- Coordinates: 38.710173°N 9.13274°W,

Website
- https://www.museudoaljube.pt/

Cadeia do Aljube is a former prison in Lisbon, Portugal, now serving as a museum.

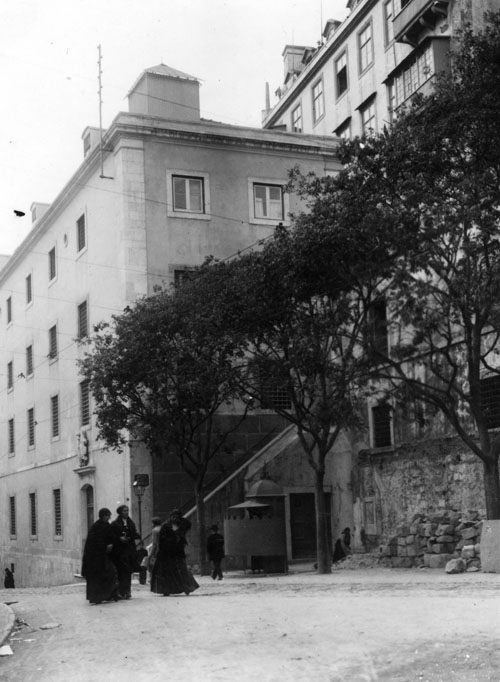
View of the prison in the early 20th century

Situated near the Sé Cathedral in the parish of Santa Maria Maior, the prison housed those convicted through the Ecclesiastical Forum until 1820, then women accused of common crimes until the end of the 1920s. From 1928 until its closure in 1965, political prisoners of the Ditadura Nacional and Estado Novo were held there. Famous former inmates include Francisco Miguel Duarte, Telo Mascarenhas and Mário Soares. After this it was converted to hold common criminals and offices of the Ministry of Justice.

== Museum ==
Since 2015, the building has been used as the Museum of the Resistance and Liberty. An inscription on the outside reads:

Here

from the silence of the "drawers"
of the homeland gnawed
of the breasts broken by the tortures of the request
rose the cry of freedom

flowered April
