= Pinto Revolt =

1787 rebellion against Portuguese rule in Goa

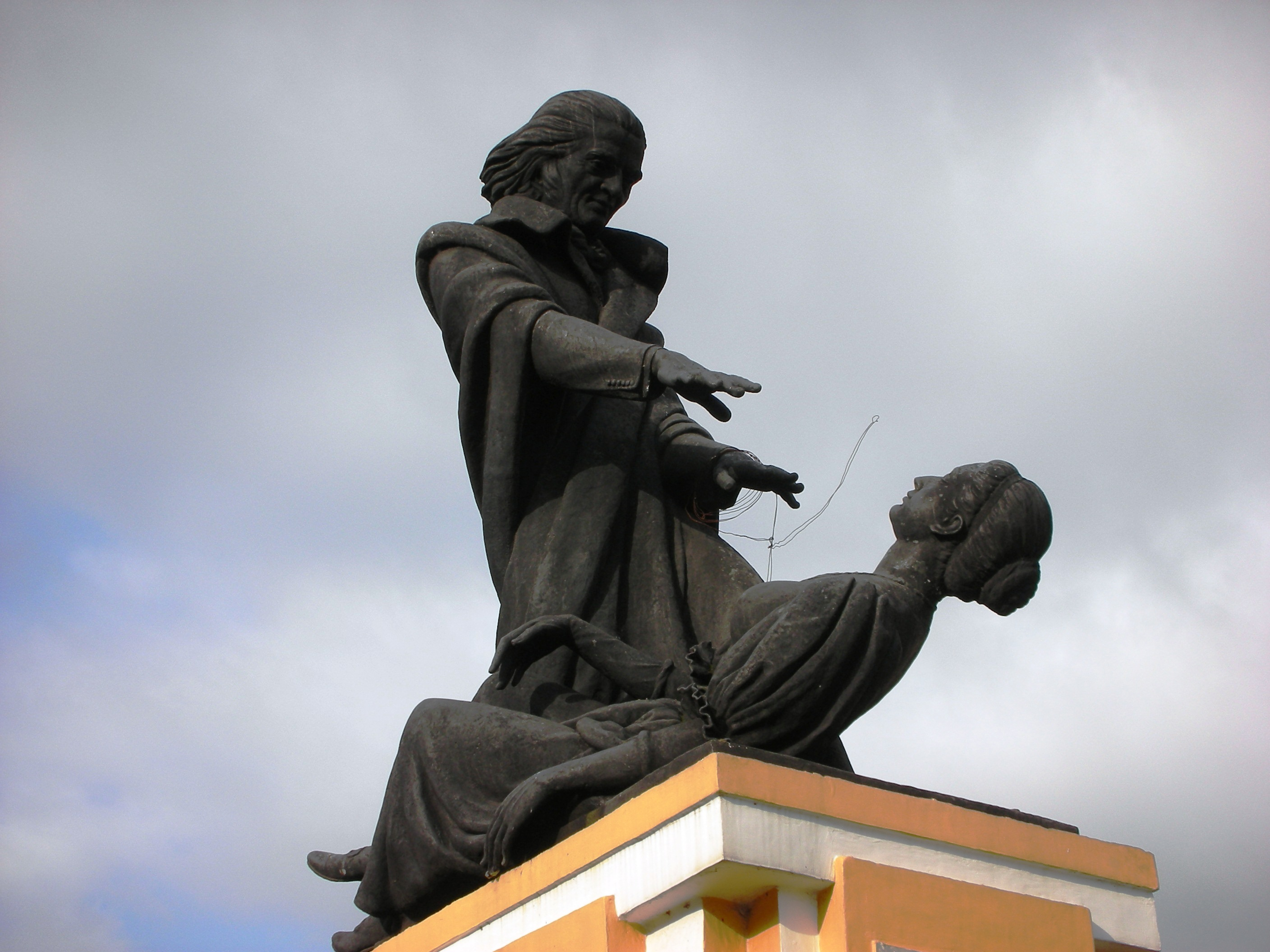
Statue in Panjim of Abade Faria, one of the conspirators

The Pinto Revolt (Portuguese: Conjuração dos Pintos), also known as the Conspiracy of the Pintos or the Pinto Conspiracy, was a rebellion against the Portuguese rule in Portuguese Goa in 1787. The leaders of the plot were three prominent priests from the village of Candolim in the concelho of Bardes, Goa. The highest-ranked leaders belonged to the Pinto clan of Candolim, hence the name of the rebellion. The Pintos were a Goan noble family and later vassals of Peshwa Baji Rao II in the Maratha Confederacy. They were one of the noblest families in Goa during the 18th century.

== Pinto Family ==
The history of Christianity of Candolim dates back to the conversion of Santu Sinay (Shenoy), a Brahmin ganvkar (Konkani: freeholder) who belonged to the nobility of his people. He was the progenitor of the Pinto family. Due to the services he provided to the Crown he was given a perpetual grave in Our Lady of Hope Church in Candolim, Goa in front of the altar.

Santu Sinay (1577–1640), was the son of Naru Sinay; who had earlier migrated from Loutolim, Salcette, and established himself in Candolim, where he purchased the fifth vangodd (clan) of the comunidade on 13 August 1604. Naru Sinay died after 1624, and was survived by his wife, and three sons—Jeronimo de Souza, Santu Sinay, and Christovão d'Andrade. Santu Sinay was converted along with the rest of his family at the age of 8, and subsequently took the name of Salvador Pinto. His godfather was Fr. Manoel Pinto, a Franciscan rector of the Church of Our Lady of Hope of Candolim and the seminary of Reis Magos. He was brought up in the seminary of Reis Magos, where he developed a great devotion to St. Francis Xavier. Salvador Pinto was tutored by two Franciscan priests, Fr. Pinto and Fr. Simão de Nazareth; who succeeded the former as rector of Candolim parish.

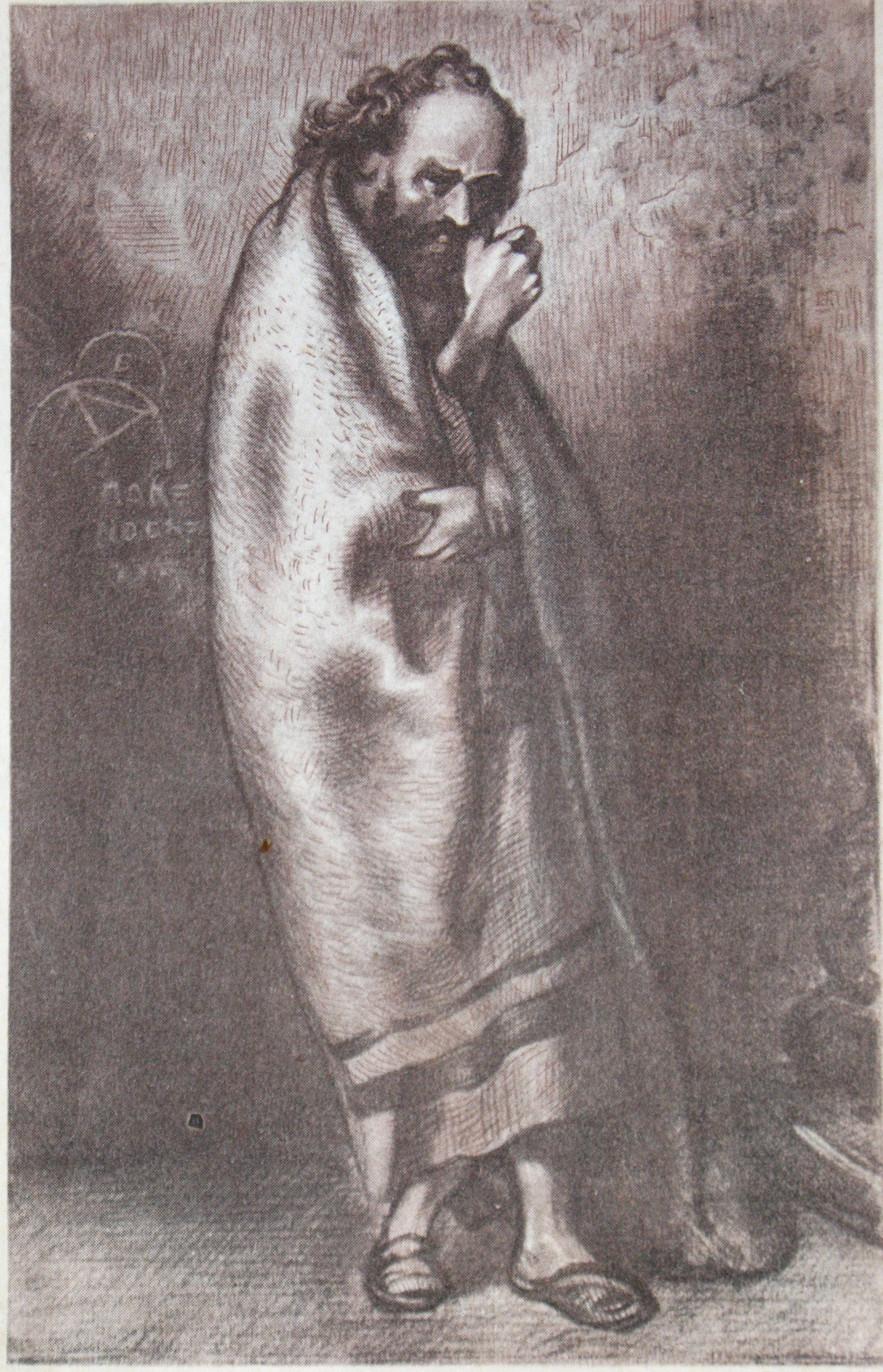
Abbe Faria, one of the conspirators, as portrayed in Alexandre Dumas's adventure novel The Count of Monte Cristo (1846)

On 2 April 1770 and 6 April 1770 respectively, the two brothers Antonio Joao Pinto of Arpora and Ignacio Pinto of Candolim were decorated with a Coat of arms and styled with the rank of Fidalgo. A fidalgo titled as a Lord is comparable in some ways to the French gentilhomme (the word also implies nobility by birth or by charge), and to the Italian nobile but having a higher rank to the British baronet as being a part of the aristocracy, not a commoner. On 17 March 1866 Alvaro Xavier Pinto, another member of the family was decorated as a Fidalgo of the Royal House.

== Principal characters ==
- Caetano Vitorino de Faria, the mastermind
- José Custódio de Faria, also known as Abbé Faria, Caetano's son who was a priest
- Caetano Francisco do Couto
- José António Gonçalves, a priest from Divar
- Ignacio Pinto, head of the Pinto clan and a fervent supporter of Fr. Faria, who was to be installed as the ruler of Goa post the revolt
- José da Rocha Dantas e Mendonça, a Judge of the Goa High Court, who was in charge of the inquest into the conspiracy

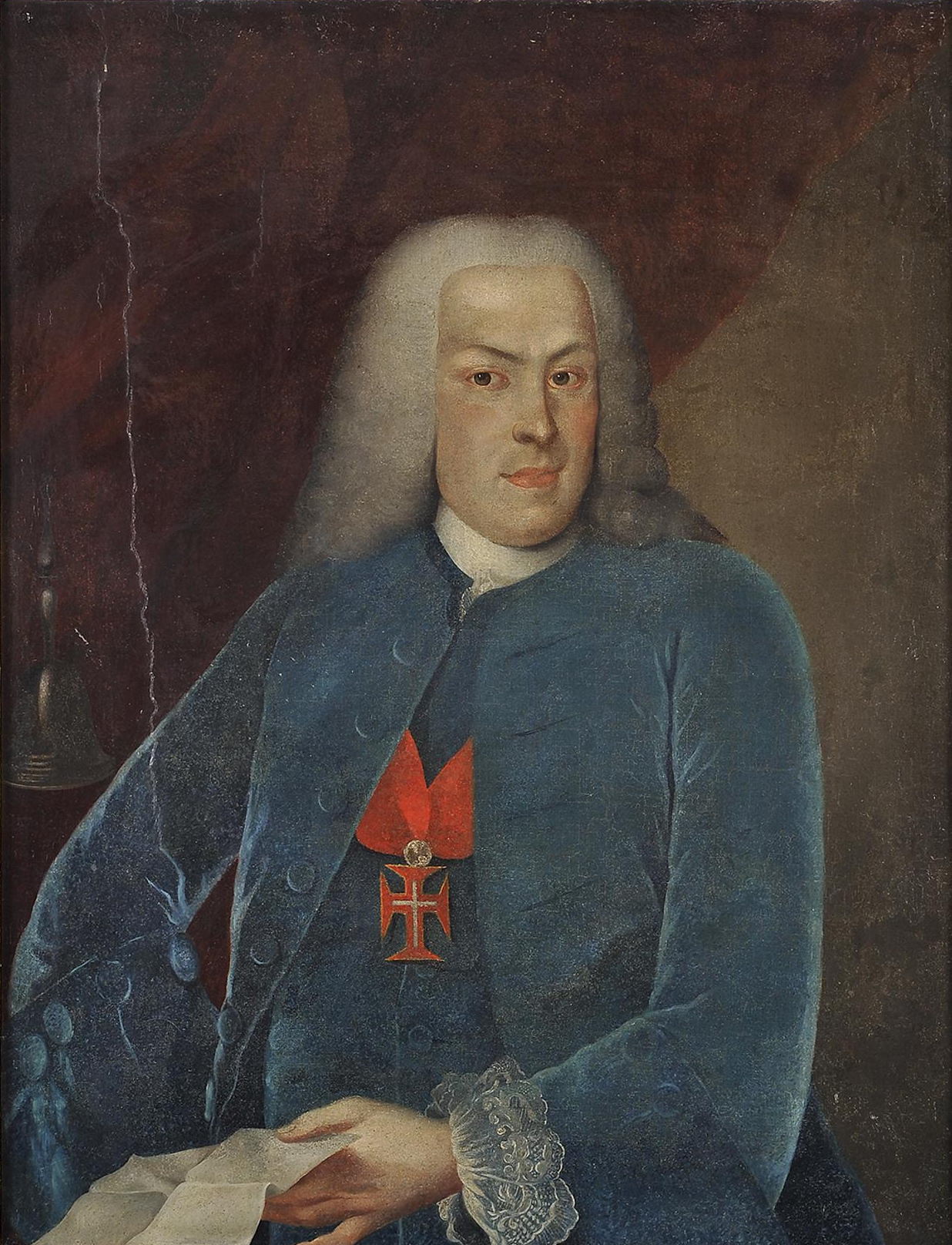
Sebastião José de Carvalho e Melo, 1st Marquis of Pombal

== Causes ==
P. Kamat writes that the protests of the various priests she studied for their non-submission to the Portuguese authority in Goa were by and large manifestations of personal grievances arising out of nepotism and class envy.

Dr. Celsa Pinto states that the American War of Independence influenced many Goans living in Lisbon.

José António Gonçalves and Caetano Faria visited Rome and Portugal to plead for their appointment as Bishops in Southern India dioceses, but these Goan priests were bypassed in favour of the local South Indian clerics (e.g. Bishop Joseph Kariattil) for the appointment to the vacant sees of Cranganore and Mylapore. As a result of this refusal, they hatched the conspiracy along with Abbé Faria. They also managed to obtain the sympathy of similarly disaffected Christians in the Army and local clergy. The conspirators also negotiated secretly with Tippu Sultan, the ruler of Mysore, inviting him to rule Goa after they had thrown Goa into disorder.

The conspiracy was revealed by a Goan Catholic baker from Salcette to the authorities (the conspirators had approached him to poison the Army's bread supplies), thereby preventing invasion from the Muslim sultanate and similar ill-treatment of Goan Catholics as what was taking place during the Captivity of Mangalorean Catholics at Seringapatam.

== Aftermath ==
The conspiracy being made known to the authorities; they took vigorous steps to pre-empt it. Some of the conspirators fled in disguise to British territory. However, the authorities arrested and punished 47 persons, including 17 priests and seven army officers.

The area around the present-day General Post Office (GPO) in Panjim is called São Tomé. The present GPO building used to be the old tobacco house, and the building to its right was the Government Mint. The area in front of these buildings was the old Panjim pillory and used to be the site of public executions and was where fifteen conspirators of the failed revolt were executed.

Gonçalves fled to British territory and lived the remainder of his life as an English teacher in Calcutta. Abbé Faria teamed up with the revolutionaries of the French Revolution and participated along with the "juring" clerics in the Revolutionaries' brutal persecution of the Catholic Church in France and elsewhere. Two Pinto brothers Lt. Col Francisco and Jose Antonio joined the army of the Maratha Empire under Baji Rao II and fought against the British in the Second Anglo-Maratha War and Third Anglo-Maratha War.

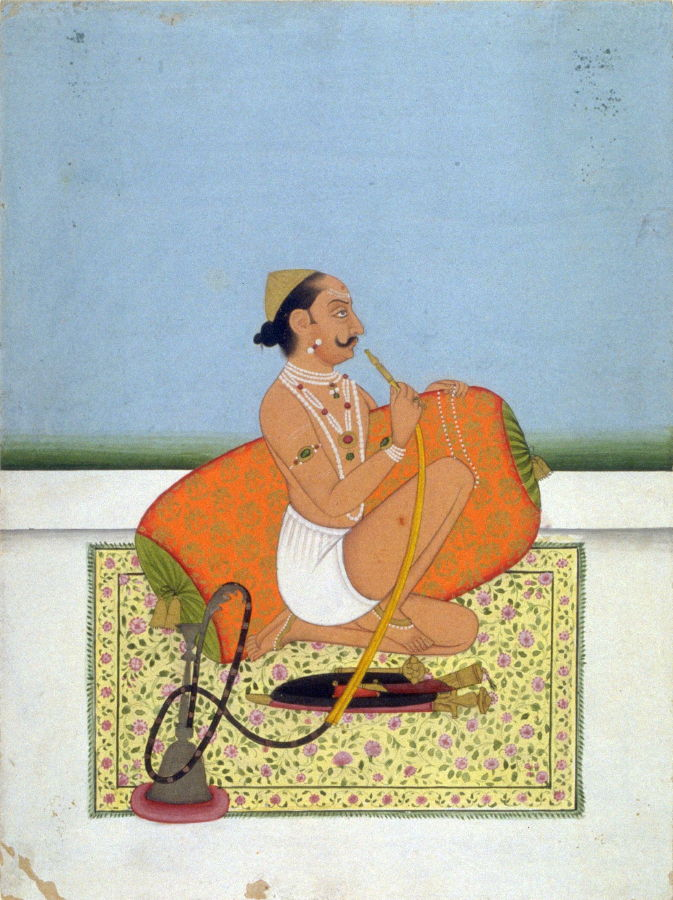
Shahu II, the Chhatrapati at the time the Pintos joined the Maratha Empire forces against the British

=== Revolutionaries who received death sentences on 13 December 1788 ===
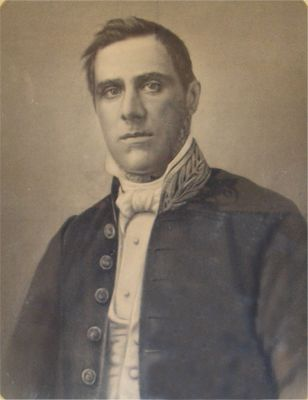
Joaquim Heliodoro da Cunha Rivara, chronicler of the Pinto Revolt

- Tenete Manoel Caetano Pinto, son of Inacio Pinto.
- Tenete Pedro Luiz Gonzaga
- David Fransisco Viegas
- Caetano Xavier da Costa
- Nicolao Luis da Costa
- Inacio Caetano Toscano
- Miguel Antonio da Costa
- Inacio Caetano Lopes
- Salvador Alvares da Costa
- Baltazar Caeiro
- Manoel Ferrao
- Antonio Fernandes
- Joao Vas
- Jose Monteiro
- Bernado de Mesquita

They were tied by ropes and dragged by horses for 40kms, after which their hands were chopped, head severed from their body and property confiscated and children and grandchildren branded by infamy.

== Effects of the revolt ==
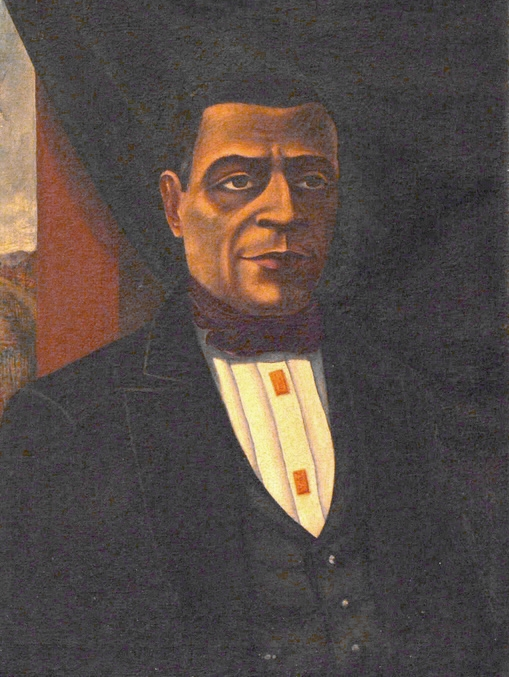
Bernardo Peres da Silva, the only ethnic Goan governor general in Colonial India

For decades after, the conspiracy was used as a stick to defame and denigrate Goan missionaries and priests in British India by their opponents, the Vicars Apostolic of the Propaganda party, Goans being of the Padroado party. The incident was used to represent the Goans to the British government and to the Christians in British India as untrustworthy, rebellious and willing to compromise with their own enemies (Tipu Sultan). This became Goa's black legend.

While the revolt failed, Goans did achieve stronger forms of Government and when the Portuguese Constitution of 1822 was adopted, two native Goans Bernardo Peres da Silva and Constâncio Roque da Costa were elected to the first parliament in Portugal, a practice that continued till the Annexation of Goa.

An account of this was done by the Portuguese civil servant Joaquim Heliodoro da Cunha Rivara which is one of the major accounts of the Pinto Revolt and subsequently translated into English by Dr. Charles Borges.

== Heraldry ==
On 2 April 1770, Antonio Joao Pinto (of Arpora) and on 6 April 1770 his brother Ignacio Pinto (of Candolim) were separately awarded a grant of arms for their descendants by Joseph I of Portugal. The arms were composed, in the first and fourth quarters, of the arms of the Pintos (five red crescents in saltire on a silver ground), in the second quarter of those of the Sequeiras (five golden escallops in saltire on a blue ground), and in the third of the arms of the Maciels (two blue fleurs-de-lis in pale on a silver ground dimidiating a red double-headed eagle displayed, also on a silver ground) and reflect the coats of arms of the Pintos, Sequeiras and Maciels from whom the family is descended. The crest is a silver leopard decorated with torteaux (red spots) with a crescent on the shoulder and for contrast a blue blazon and silver harpoon.

Coat of arms of the Pinto family
Granted 1770 Armiger All the descendants of Antonio Joao Pinto and Ignacio Pinto Crest A leopard rampant argent semy of torteaux charged on the shoulder with a crescent and for contrast a blue blazon and silver harpoon. Escutcheon Quarterly, 1 and 4, Argent, five crescents gules in saltire (Pinto); 2, Azure, five escallops or in saltire (Sequeira); 3, Argent, two fleurs-de-lis azure in pale dimidiating Argent, a double-headed eagle displayed gules (Maciel)

== Sources ==
- da Cunha Rivara, Joaquim Heliodoró (1996). Charles J. Borges (ed.). Goa and the Revolt of 1787. Translated by Renato da Cunha Soares. New Delhi: Concept Publishing. ISBN 81-7022-646-5. (Author was the Portuguese Chief Secretary of the Goa Government from 1855 to 1877)
- Prabhu, Alan Machado (1999). Sarasvati's Children: A History of the Mangalorean Christians. I.J.A. Publications. ISBN 978-81-86778-25-8.
