= Telo de Mascarenhas =

Indian writer and poet (1899–1979)

- Mascarenhas in 1940s
- Born: 23 March 1899; Marmagoa, Goa, Portuguese India
- Died: 1979 (aged 79–80)
- Education: University of Coimbra (1930)
- Occupations: Writer; poet; journalist; freedom fighter
- Years active: 1920s–1970s
- Movement: Goa liberation movement

Telo de Mascarenhas (23 March 1899 – 1979) was an Indian writer, poet, journalist and freedom fighter.

== Biography ==
In 1920, Mascarenhas travelled to Portugal to study, graduating in law from the University of Coimbra in 1930, where he was taught by Portuguese statesman António de Oliveira Salazar, amongst others. During this period he founded Lisbon's Centro Nacionalista Hindu in 1926, and the periodical Índia Nova, alongside fellow poet Adeodato Barreto and other émigré Goan intellectuals. Through the 1930s and 1940s, Mascerenhas worked in the Portuguese judicial system, first in the Algarve and then in the Alentejo.

After India's independence from Britain in 1948, Mascerenhas returned to the subcontinent and actively participated in the Goa liberation movement. Although he spent some time in Goa, he was forced into exile and spent the years 1950-58 in Bombay. During his years of exile in Bombay, he published clandestinely Ressurge Goa, a political newspaper from 1950 to 1959. Returning to Goa in 1959, he was arrested, and the Portuguese rulers deported him to Portugal where he was jailed, first in Aljube prison and then in Caxias. Some years after the annexation of Goa he was released by the Government of Portugal in 1970 in exchange for the release of the Goan priest Chico Monteiro, who had been placed under house arrest by the Indian authorities for refusing to give up his Portuguese nationality.

On his return to Goa from Portugal in 1970, Mascarenhas founded the Círculo de Amizade Indo-Portuguesa (the Indo-Portuguese Friendship Society) and restarted Ressurge Goa as a cultural and political paper.

== Works ==
Mascarenhas was a prolific poet in Portuguese and also did a Portuguese translation of the autobiography of anti-colonial nationalist Mahatma Gandhi and of many novels by Bengali poet Rabindranath Tagore.

=== Poetry in Portuguese ===
Mascarenhas published two volumes of poetry: Poemas de Desespero e Concolação (Poems of Despair and Consolation, 1971) and Ciclo Goês (Goan Cycle, 1973).

- Dois Poemas
- As Sementeiras
- A Primavera Chegou

=== Prose writing in Portuguese ===
Mascarenhas published an English-language autobiography, When the Mango-Trees Blossomed, in 1975. In it Mascarenhas claims to have written a novel and a novella during his incarceration in Portugal. The novel, Jogos Malabares (Malarbar Games), which he had to hide from the prison authorities, appears to have been lost. The novella was his Sinfonia Goesa, written in 1962 while Mascerenhas was imprisoned in Aljube gaol. Though it was never published in its entirety, several fragments saw the light of day in the post-Liberation Portuguese-language press. Some of Mascarenhas's writing has been published in English translation.

- Crónica de Viagem a Bombaim

== External references ==
- Bio entry on Mascarenhas
- Obituary of Telo de Mascarenhas (in Portuguese)
- Text by Mascarenhas recollecting his political past (in Portuguese)
- Mascarenhas memories of the Liberation of Goa as accompanied from his prison cell (in Portuguese)
- Poem dedicated to Mascarenhas by Eduardo Pereira de Andrade (in Portuguese)
