= Ramchandra Pandurang Kamat =

Indian sculptor (1907–2000)

- Born: 30 July 1907; Madkai, Portuguese Goa
- Died: c. 25 May 2000 (aged 92)
- Education: Sir J. J. School of Art; Royal Academy of Arts
- Known for: Sculpture
- Notable work: Abbé Faria Statue; Nagda Putla

Ramchandra Pandurang Kamat (30 July 1907 – c. 25 May 2000) is an Indian sculptor from Goa. He gained international recognition as the first Indian to win a gold medal at the Royal Academy of Arts in London. Many popular statues in India, including the Abbé Faria statue at Panjim, the Nagda Putla at Prabhadevi, and the Shivaji statue at Pratapgad Fort are his works.

== Early life and education ==
Kamat was born on 30 July 1907 in the village of Madkai, Portuguese Goa, into a family of modest means. After completing his primary education in his native village, he moved to Bombay to pursue his artistic interests. From a young age, he harboured a desire to become a painter or sculptor.

At the age of 13, he ran away from home and traveled to Bombay to pursue his artistic interests. Upon arriving in the city, he initially joined the Ketkar Art Institute in Girgaon to learn painting. However, he soon shifted his focus from painting to the study of sculpture, where he found significant success.

In 1928, he enrolled at the Sir J. J. School of Art. His ability to create independent and distinct artistic works made him a favorite student of the principal, Gladstone Solomon. Kamat subsequently won several awards for his exhibits, including a silver medal at the Bombay Art Society's annual exhibition for a sculpture titled Nustekar Busho. Encouraged by this early success and Principal Solomon, he traveled to England around 1930–1931 to pursue higher education in sculpture.

== Career ==
=== Time in Europe ===
Kamat gained admission to the Royal Academy of Arts in London. During his time there, he received a special request from the Director, Sir William Macmillan, to create a sculpture. Kamat produced a piece titled Expulsion of Adam and Eve from the Eden Garden.

At the age of 24, his interpretation of the biblical theme earned him the institution's gold medal, a scholarship, and other honours. This achievement made him the first Indian in history to receive the Royal Academy's gold medal and brought him international fame.

Kamat spent time in London winning various other prizes and traveled across Europe, visiting France, Portugal, and Italy, where he was acclaimed as a genius among contemporary sculptors.

=== Return to India ===
Driven by nostalgia for his homeland, Kamat returned to India. Upon his arrival in Bombay, he was given a public reception at the Goan Institute in Dabul. He was also grandly honored by the Goan community upon his return. At the reception, he was praised by Dr. Leonard Raymond, who was then the Principal of St. Sebastian Goan High School and later became the Archbishop of Nagpur.

=== Notable works ===
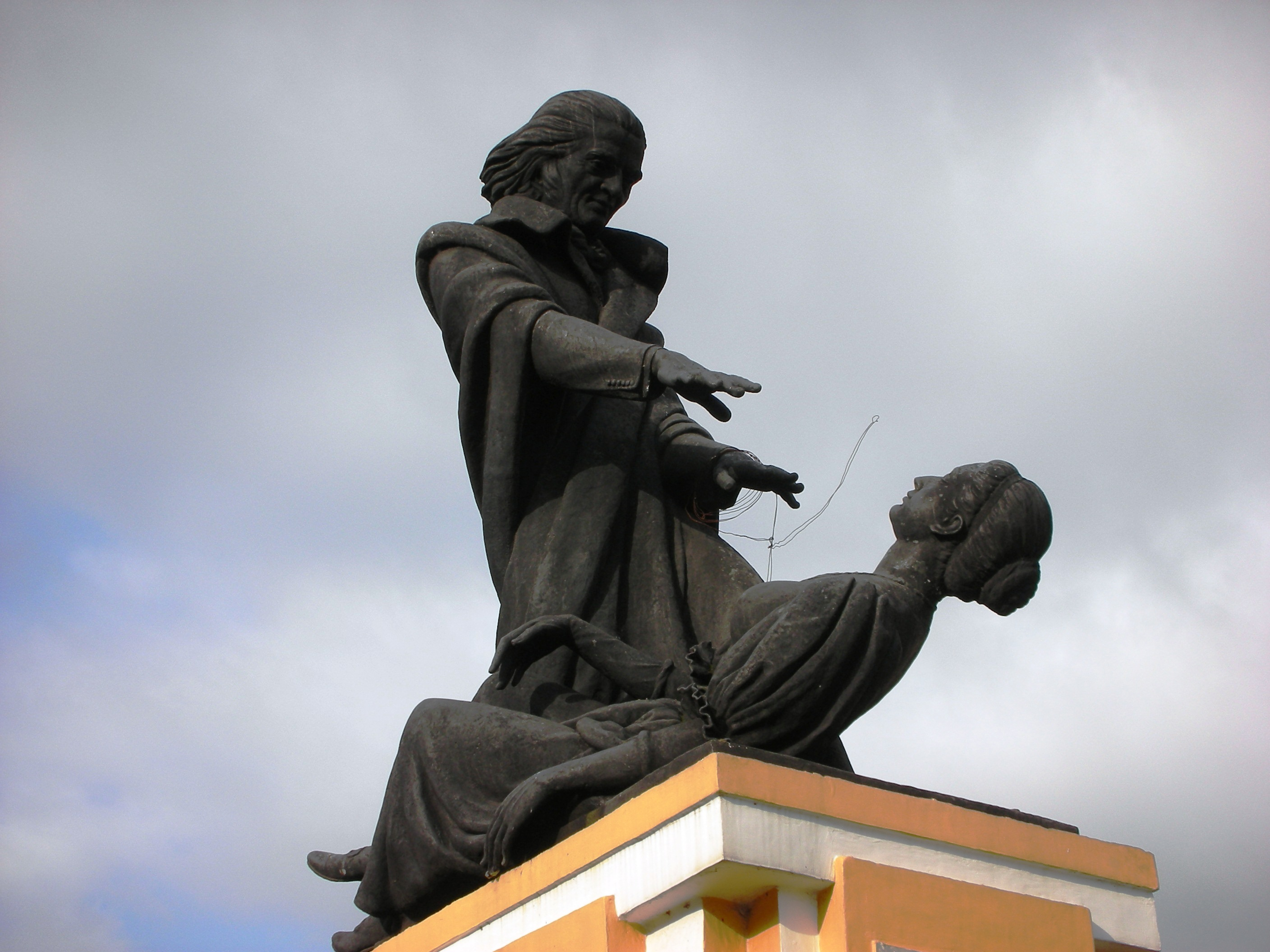
Statue of Abbé Faria at Panjim, Goa

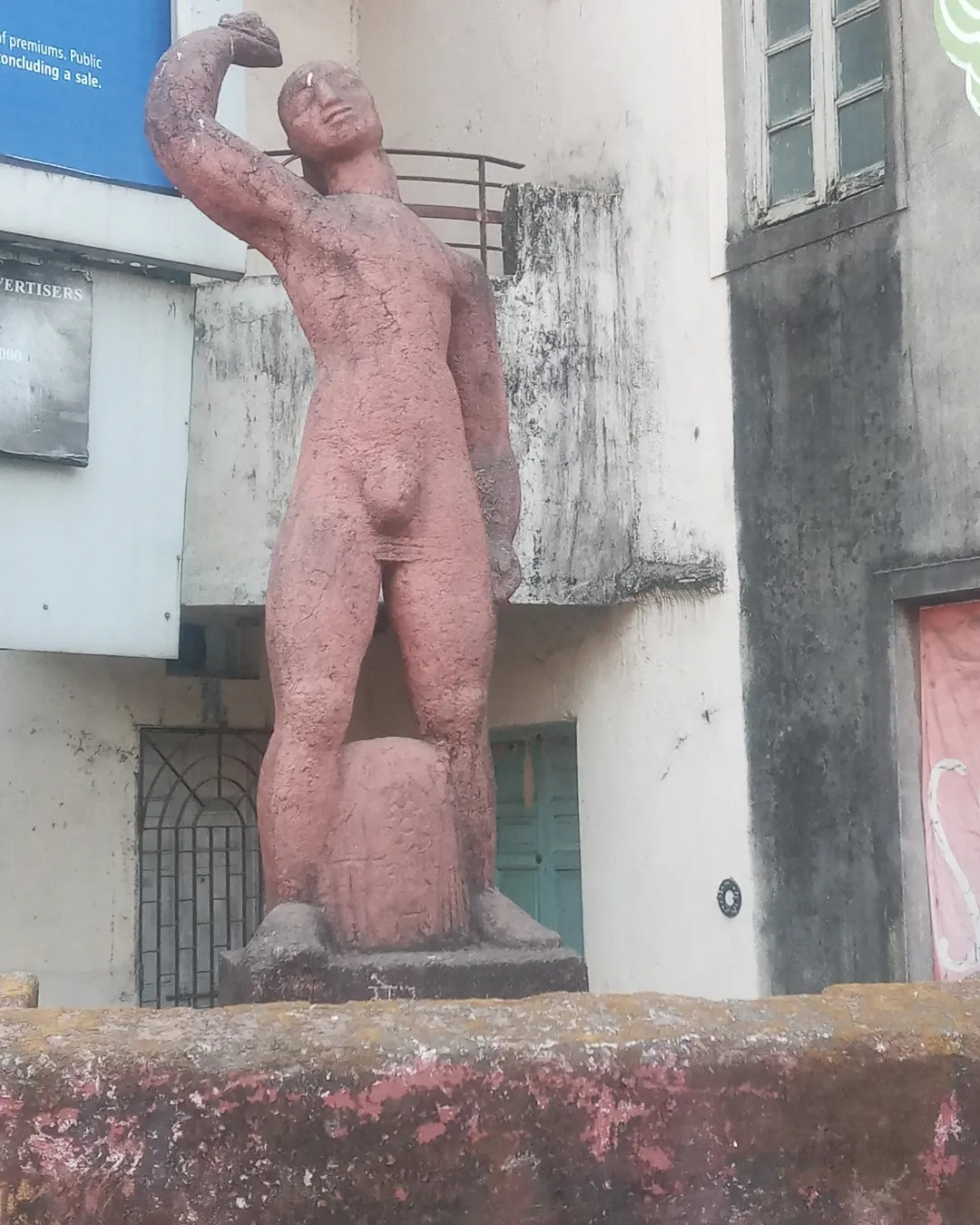
Nagda Putla Statue facing Prabhadevi Road

Kamat's sculptures are located in various cities including Delhi, Jhansi, and across Goa. Some of his most notable works include:

- The Abbé Faria Statue: A statue of Abbé Faria located near the Old Secretariat in Panjim, Goa.
- Laxmi (1940): A sculpture of the goddess Laxmi situated at the top of the Laxmi Insurance Building on Pherozeshah Mehta Road, Bombay.
- Sir Dinsha Wacha: A life-size standing statue of Sir Dinsha Wacha located opposite the main gate of the Churchgate railway station in Bombay.
- Shivaji: A giant statue of Shivaji guarding the Pratapgad Fort in Maharashtra. This statue was inaugurated by Jawaharlal Nehru.
- Nagda Putla (Naked Statue): A statue of a naked farmer in Prabhadevi, Mumbai
- Rani Lakshmibai: A 16-foot tall equestrian statue of Rani Lakshmibai located in Jhansi.

== Philosophy ==
Kamat was known for his simple and unassuming nature. He held the view that "the form of art is very vast and we cannot bind it in any one form." He had a strong affinity for the Konkani language; he had written occasionally in the language and had delivered talks on sculpture for All India Radio.

== Death ==
Kamat died on c. 25 May 2000.
