= Chico Monteiro =

Portuguese Catholic priest (1918–1990)

Monsignor Chico Monteiro
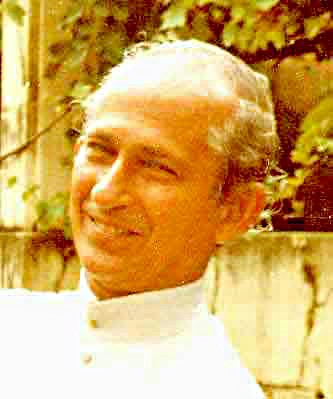
- Monteiro in 1982
- Born: Sebastiao Francisco Xavier dos Remedios Monteiro; 1 February 1918; Candolim, Goa, Portuguese India
- Died: 29 October 1990 (aged 72); Goa, India
- Occupation: Catholic priest
- Known for: Refusal of Indian citizenship following the annexation of Goa

Monsignor Sebastiao Francisco Xavier dos Remedios "Chico" Monteiro (1 February 1918 – 29 October 1990) was a Portuguese Catholic priest. Following the annexation of Goa, India issued an edict requiring Goans to pledge allegiance to the country and acquire an Indian passport – or, in the alternative, leave Goa and emigrate to Portugal. Monteiro made global waves when he refused to leave his homeland or surrender his Portuguese passport, resulting in his arrest and detention. In his defense at trial, he echoed what he believed to be the essence of the safeguards in the Geneva Convention: "I was born in Goa and lived all my life peacefully in Goa".

Monteiro was represented in court by Queen Elizabeth's personal counsel, Edward Gardner. After a legal marathon spanning 5 years, Monteiro was finally convicted for his defiance of Indian rule and sentenced by the Supreme Court of India. He spent a year in solitary confinement in the maximum security jail in Patiala, Punjab, before the Holy See in Rome intervened and obtained his release. In a quid pro quo, Monteiro was exchanged for Telo Mascarenhas, a political activist who had supported the Indian government against the Portuguese in Goa and who had been deported to Portugal in 1959 and jailed there in the Peniche Fortress penitentiary.

== Early life ==
The youngest of five siblings, Monteiro was born in Candolim, Portuguese Goa, on 1 February 1918, and baptized as Sebastiao Francisco Xavier dos Remedios Monteiro. His parents, Jose and Maria-Helena Monteiro, came from a lineage of devout Goan Catholics who were originally Gaud-Saraswat Brahmins of the Pai clan whose ancestors were among the first converts in Candolim and Bardez in 1596. In 1802, the Monteiro family was honoured by the Portuguese King, Dom Joao VI with a "brazao" (coat of arms) for their dedication to the Church and the local community.

On 3 October 1942 Monteiro was ordained a priest, and in 1957 was conferred the title of Monsignor by Pope Pius XII.

== Trial and solitary confinement ==
Goa was a Portuguese colony for about 450 years until it was seized on 19 December 1961 by the Indian Armed Forces in a brief military action. In 1962, the President of India legislated an Ordinance whereby, Goans had the option of either becoming Indian citizens, retain Portuguese nationality by registering themselves as foreigners, or in the alternative, emigrate to Portugal.

Monteiro initially opted to register himself as a foreigner and obtained a temporary residential permit which allowed him to reside in India until 13 November 1964. However, when his residential permit expired on 13 November 1964, he refrained from renewing it. This automated a deportation order issued by the Lt. Governor of Goa to exit the country. Monteiro defied the order on the grounds that he was protected by the Geneva Conventions Act which was first adopted in 1864 and ratified in 1949. This defiance led to legal proceedings against Monteiro towards deportation.

The trial gained notoriety and it was the Indian Government this time which suddenly found itself coming under judicial scrutiny and going on the defensive. The trial also aroused the interest of António de Oliveira Salazar, then President of Portugal.

Portugal appointed Queen Elizabeth's personal counsel, Edward Gardner, to represent Monteiro. While the case wended its way through the trial and appellate courts, Monteiro remained in judicial custody in Goa. Finally, on 26 March 1969 the Supreme Court of India upheld the deportation order issued by the trial court and Monteiro was sentenced to solitary confinement in a maximum security jail in Patiala, Punjab.

Monteiro spent a year in solitary confinement before the Holy See intervened for his release. In a quid pro quo, Monteiro was exchanged for Telo Mascarenhas, a political activist who had supported the Indian government against the Portuguese in Goa, who was then arrested in 1959, deported to Portugal and incarcerated in the Peniche penitentiary.

After his return to Goa, Monteiro was placed under house arrest, was barred from holding any official position and his movements were harshly restricted and under constant judicial review. The restriction was subsequently eased and Monteiro was permitted to travel freely within the territory of Goa.

== Death ==
Monteiro died on 29 October 1990 in Goa, India.

== Legacy ==
On 1 February 2018, marked Monteiro's birth centennial. The Fr. Chico Monteiro Memorial Trust released a book chronicling his life and works.
