= Vincent Alvares =

Portuguese medical practitioner (1680–1738)

Vicente Alvares
- Born: c. 1680; Chorão, Goa, Portuguese India
- Died: 19 November 1738 (aged 57–58); Margão, Goa, Portuguese India
- Occupations: Medical practitioner; clergyman
- Spouses: Joana Marcelina Correia (died); Úrsula Francisca Moniz (died)
- Children: 5

Vicente Alvares (c. 1680 – 19 November 1738) was a Portuguese priest born in Belbatta, in the island of Chorão in 1680. He was a medical practitioner and chemist of King John V of Portugal. In 1713, he accompanied the General of the Arraial of Ponda, Antonio do Amaral Sarmento, to Sunda in Kanara. He would supply medicines free of charge to all army men and auxiliaries in Salcette. After the death of his second wife, he entered the priesthood and died in Margão on the 19 November 1738.

== Biography ==
Vincent Alvares was the son of Sr. António Rafael Álvares and Antónia Dias. He was the husband of Joana Marcelina Correia and Úrsula Francisca Moniz. He had five children, Manuel Caetano Alvares; Mariana Álvares; Maria Benedita Álvares; Ana Josefa Alvares e Barreto and Caetano José Álvares.

Alvares was a medical practitioner and chemist of John V of Portugal. He was issued letter to practice by the chief physician of Goa. He accompanied the General of the Arraial of Ponda, Antonio do Amaral Sarmento to Sunda in Kanara in 1713 in Salsette supplying medicines free of charge to all army men and auxiliaries. Twice a widower, he entered the priesthood after the death of his second wife and died in Margão on 19 November 1738.

== Family ==
Alvares was a descendant of Lourenço Alvares, a Brahmin from Querem who converted to Roman Catholicism. His son, Manuel Caetano Alvares, was the first and only Goan to be given capelo gratuito of the Faculty of Medicine by an order issued by King Joseph I of Portugal.
