= Candolim =

- Town
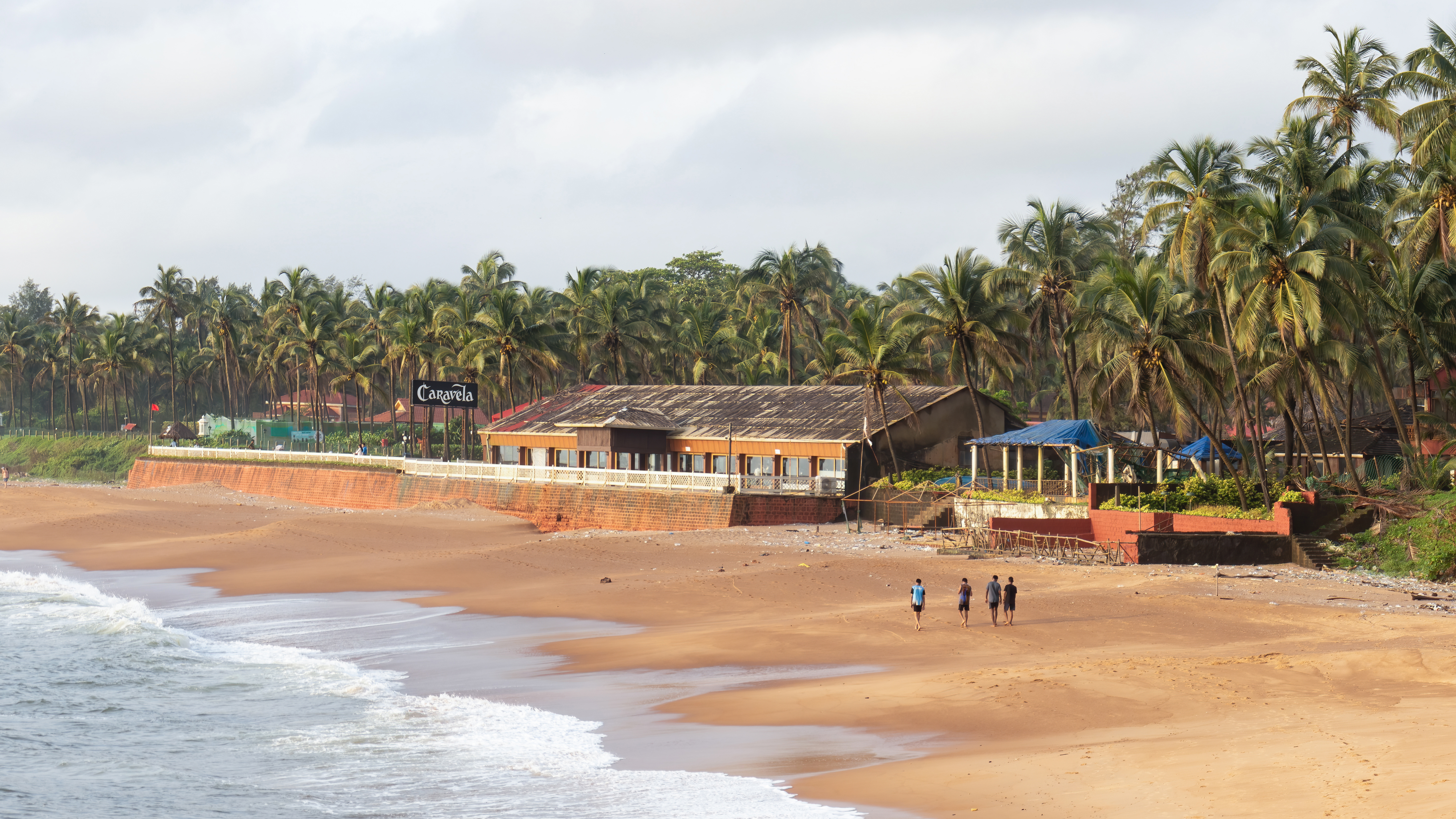
- Sinquerim Beach, Candolim

- Location in Goa, India Candolim (India)
- Coordinates: 15.52°N 73.75°E
- Country: India
- State: Goa
- District: North Goa
- Elevation: 0 m (0 ft)

Population (2011)
  - Total: 8,500

Languages
  - Official: Konkani
- Time zone: UTC+5:30 (IST)
- PIN: 403515
- Telephone code: 0832248
- Vehicle registration: GA-01
- Website: goa.gov.in

Candolim is a census town in North Goa and is located in the Bardez taluka in the state of Goa, India. It is situated just south of Calangute Beach and north of Sinquerim.

== History ==
During the late 16th century, Candolim became the first village to be entirely converted to Christianity in Bardez by the Franciscans. The present Christian identity of its villagers dates back to the conversion of Santu Sinay (Shenoy), a Brahmin ganvkar (Konkani: freeholder) who belonged to the nobility of his people. He was the progenitor of the noble revolutionary Pinto family.

Santu Sinay (1577–1640) was the son of Naru Sinay, who had earlier migrated from Loutolim, Salcette, and established himself in Candolim, where he purchased the fifth vangodd (clan) of the comunidade on 13 August 1604. Naru Sinay died after 1624, and was survived by his wife, and three sons—Jeronimo de Souza, Santu Sinay, and Christovão d'Andrade. Santu Sinay was converted along with the rest of his family at the age of 8, and subsequently took the name of Salvador Pinto. His godfather was Fr. Manoel Pinto, a Franciscan rector of the Church of Our Lady of Hope of Candolim and the seminary of Reis Magos. He was brought up in the seminary of Reis Magos, where he developed a great devotion to St. Francis Xavier. Salvador Pinto was tutored by two Franciscan priests, Fr. Pinto and Fr. Simão de Nazareth, who succeeded the former as rector of Candolim parish. Salvador Pinto worked zealously to spread Christianity in the village.

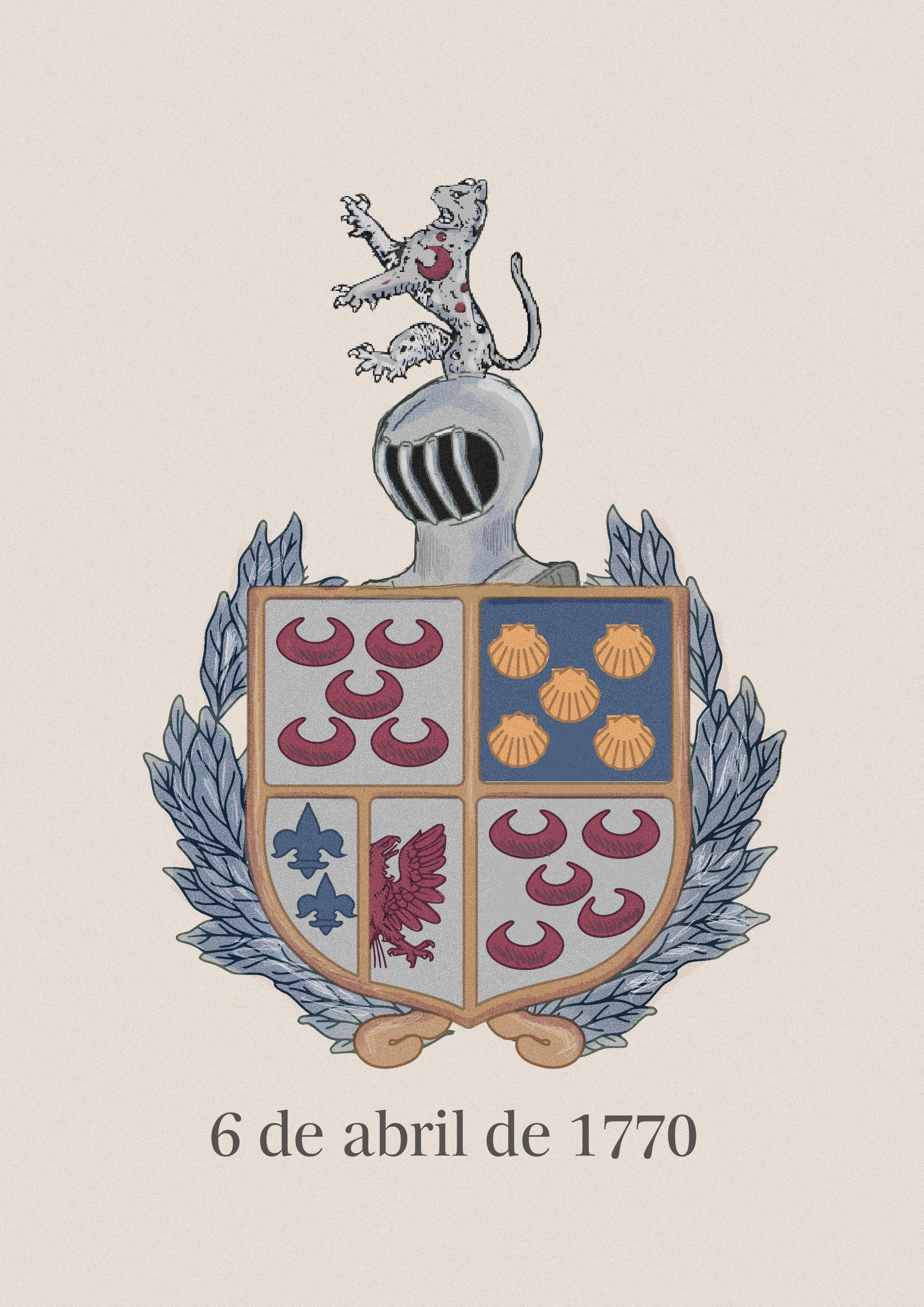
Coat of Arms of the Pintos, awarded by the King of Portugal in 1770

Fr. de Nazareth held great influence with the Viceroys and in recognition of Salvador Pinto's tremendous work in converting the village, obtained for him many life grants and concessions which are still held by his descendants. Fr. de Nazareth, as representative of Fr. Miguel de S. Bonaventura—Custodian and General Commissioner of East Indies and Diogo Dias, syndic of St. Francis and procurator of His Holiness—granted two perpetual graves in the Candolim Church, to Salvador Pinto and his father-in-law António Pereira in the transept, in front of the altar of Bom Jesus, and also to his wife and mother-in-law, Maria and Catharina Pereira in the transept; her grave located between those of two parishioners, Pedro Sequeira and Francisco de Souza.

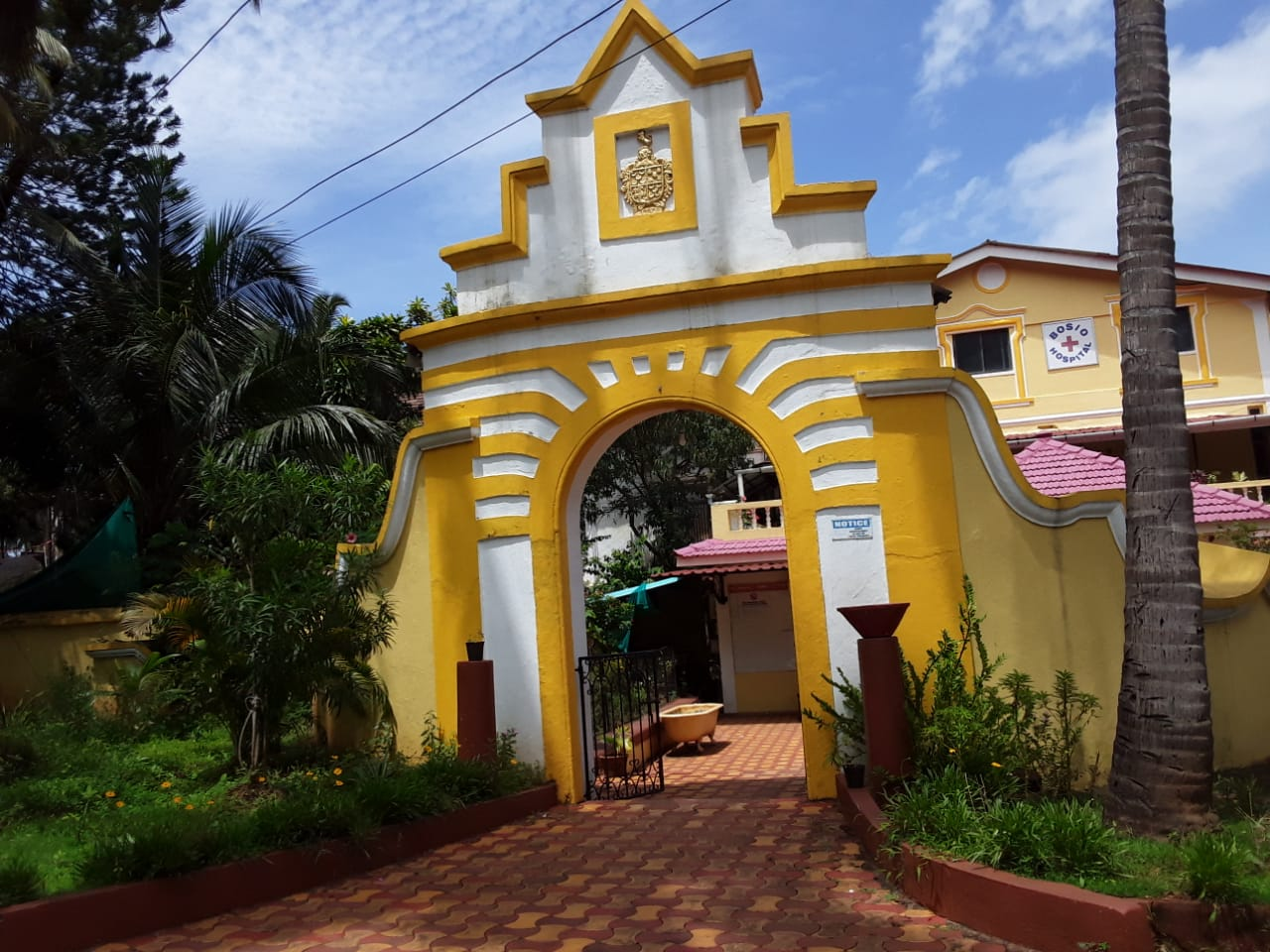
The House of the Pintos, now Bosio hospital in Candolim

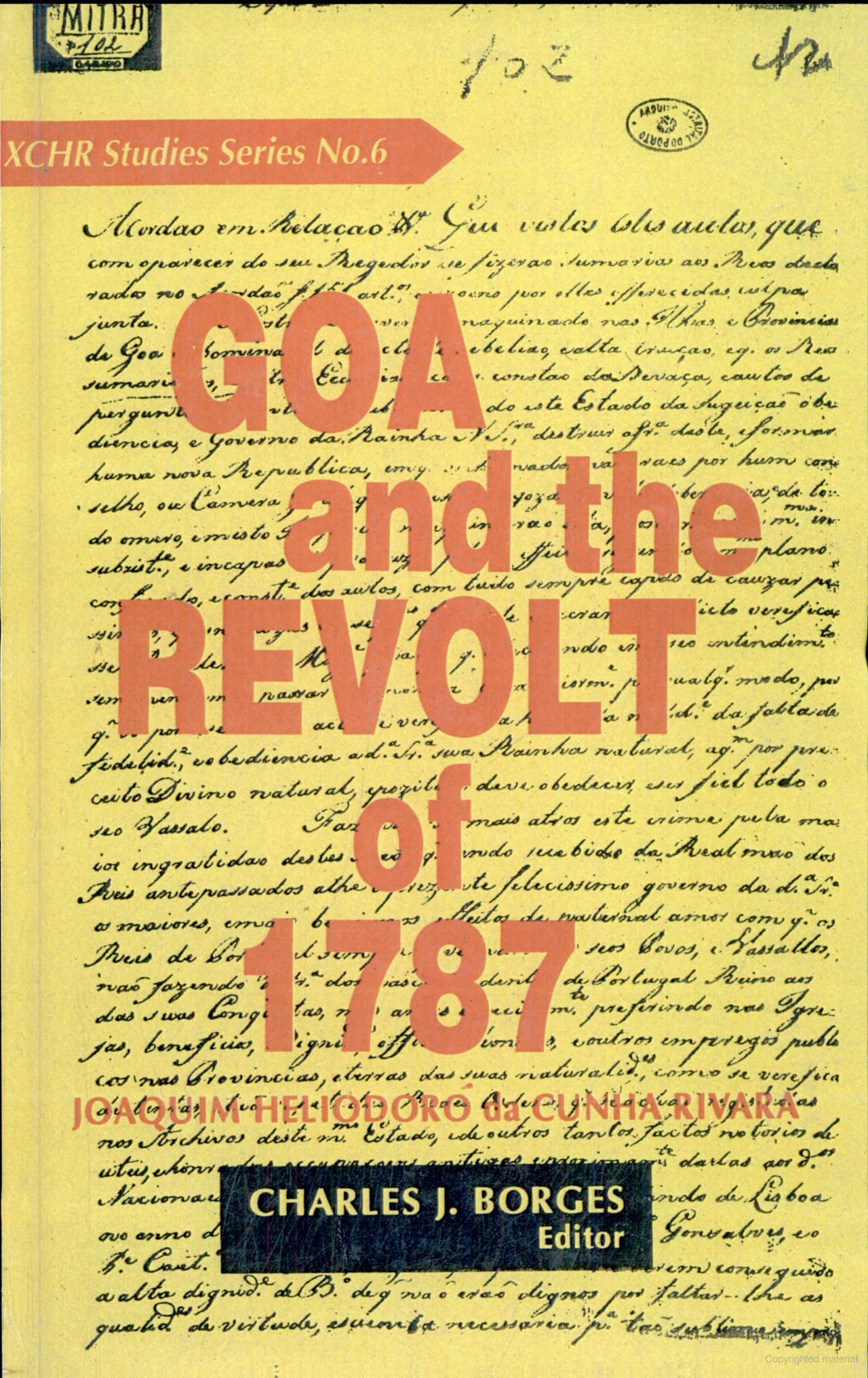
English Version of the Pinto Revolt chronicle

Candolim was the focal point of the anti-Portuguese revolt of 1787, also called the "Conspiracy of the Pintos", because it was spearheaded by priests belonging to the village's Pinto (Shenoy) clan. This revolt occurred due to the continued discrimination of the natives related to positions in clergy and government. This angered the Pinto family who were among the protectors of the Portuguese in Goa and had been awarded a coat of arms in 1770.

The house of the Pintos today stands as Bosio Hospital in Candolim which was donated to the Sisters of Charity of Sts. Bartolomea Capitanio and Vincenza Gerosa by heirs of Ignacio Pinto in Pinto Vaddo.

== Demographics ==
As of the 2011 Census of India, Candolim had a population of 8500. Males constitute 52% of the population and females 48%. Candolim has an average literacy rate of 76%, higher than the national average of 59.5%, with male literacy of 81% and female literacy of 70%. 9% of the population is under 6 years of age.

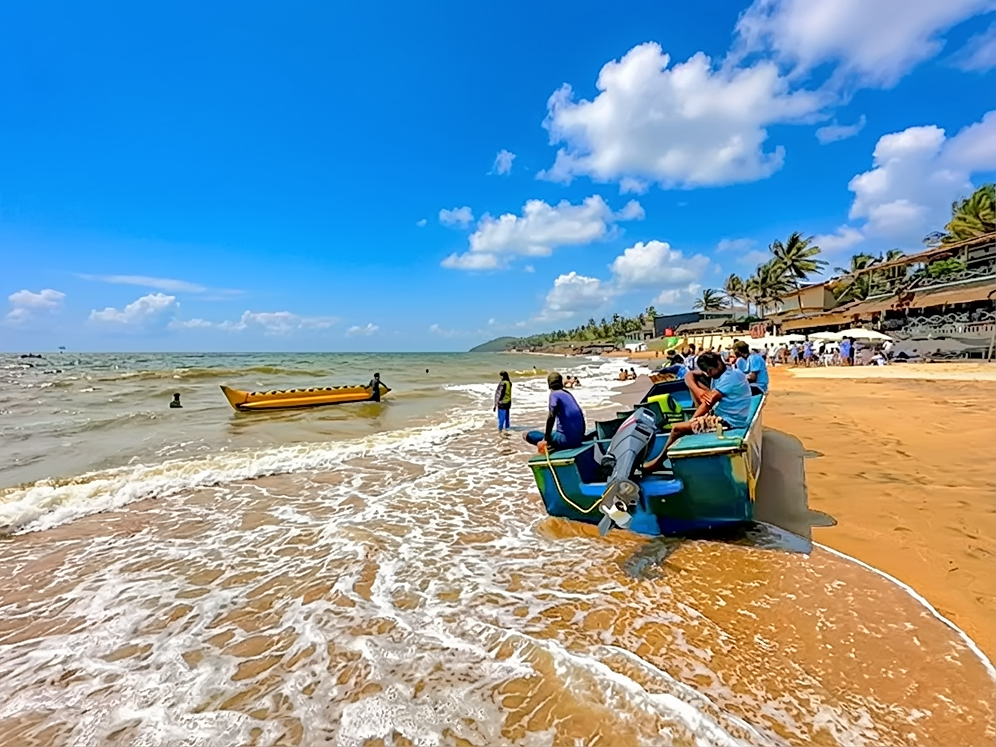
Candolim Beach is located in North Goa, India,
