= Asif Currimbhoy =

Indian playwright

Asif Currimbhoy (1928–1994) was an Indian playwright who wrote in English. He was among the very few Indian dramatists writing plays exclusively in English. He wrote and/or produced over thirty plays in several genres. His work incorporated monologues, choruses, chants, songs, mime, slide projections, and filmed footage.

== Early life ==
Born as a Khoja Muslim, his father was an industrialist and his mother was a social worker. He became acquainted with English at a young age, while studying at St. Xavier's College in Bombay (now Mumbai). This enabled him to attain mastery over the language. He pursued his higher education in the United States at the University of Wisconsin–Milwaukee Extension where he developed a love for Shakespearean drama which continued to have a profound influence on his work. After returning to India, he initially worked for the Burmah-Shell oil company, but gave up that position to pursue playwrighting full-time as he became successful.

== Career ==
His first play Goa, written in 1964, deals with racial discrimination as a paradigm of postcolonialism. Other major plays include The Doldrummers (1960), The Dumb Dancer (1961), The Hungry Ones (1965), The Refugee (1971), Sonar Bangla (1972), and The Dissident M.L.A (1974) . His plays also enjoyed success in the United States. The Dumb Dancer was staged Off-Off-Broadway at Café La MaMa in 1966 and Goa received a full Broadway production in 1968.

== Plays ==
- Inquilab.
- The refugee.
- Sonar Bangla (A play on the Tyranny of Pakistan).
- Doldrummers.
- Goa.
- An experiment with truth.
- Om Mane Padme Hum.
- Thorns on a Canvas.
- The hungry ones.
- The miracle seed.
- The dissident MLA.
- Monsoon
- The Captives
- The experiment with truth
- Angkor

== Bibliography ==
- The complete plays of Asif Currimbhoy. Calcutta: Writers Workshop, 1970.
- The Best Plays Of Asif Currimbhoy: A Critical Study, Krishna Avtar Agrawal. Book Enclave Publishers, 2007. ISBN 8181521803.
- Asif Currimbhoy: The Doldrummers: A Critical Study. by Shyam S. Agarwalla, 2010. Prakash Book Depot, Bareilly, 2010. ISBN 8179773531.
- The Plays of Asif Currimbhoy: A Reading in Postcolonialism by Yoosaph Aayalakkandy.LAP Lambert Academic Publishing, 2012. ISBN 3847374796.
- Political Elements in the Plays of Asif Currimbhoy by Pratik Dalwadi. Scholars' Press, 2019. ISBN 6138914953.
- Socio-Cultural' Elements in The Plays of Asif Currimbhoy by Pratik Dalwadi. Scholars' Press, 2019. ISBN 6138910176.
