= Jackie Shroff filmography =

List of films of Indian actor Jackie Shroff

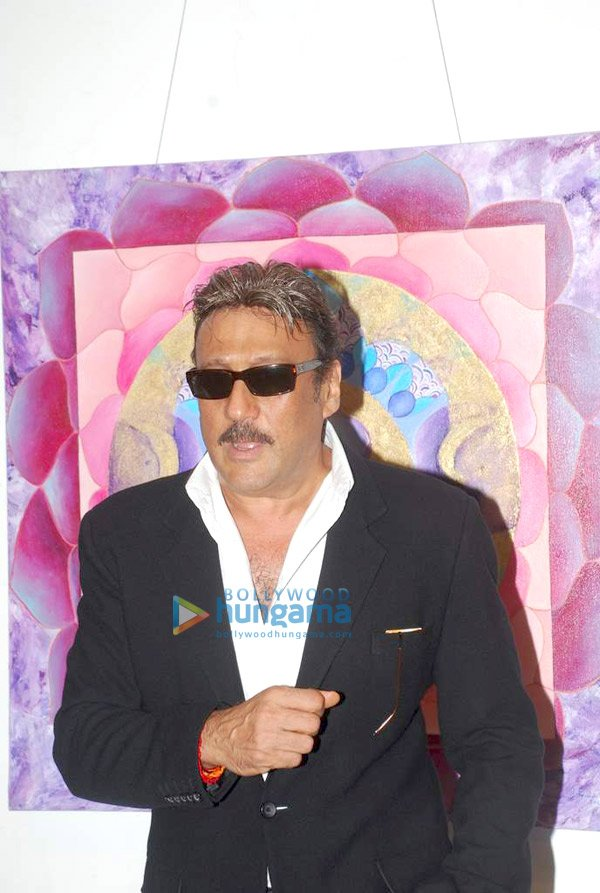
- Shroff at an event
- Film: 250
- Television series: 9

Jackie Shroff (born 1 February 1957) is an Indian actor. He has worked in Hindi films for almost four decades and has appeared in more than 250 films in thirteen languages (Hindi, Tamil, Telugu, Malayalam, Kannada, Marathi, Konkani, Odia, Punjabi, Bengali, Bhojpuri, Gujarati and English). He has won four Filmfare Awards among other accolades. He has also appeared in several successful short films.

== Hindi ==
Year	Film	Role(s)	Notes
1982	Swami Dada	Henchman	
1983	Hero	Jackie Dada/Jai Kishan	
1984	Andar Baahar	Inspector Ravi	
1985	Yudh	Inspector Vikram (Vicky)	
1985	Teri Meherbaniyan	Ram	
1985	Shiva Ka Insaaf	Shiva/Bhola	
1985	Aaj Ka Daur	Raja	
1985	Paisa Yeh Paisa	Shyam	
1985	Jaanoo	Ravi/Jaanoo	
1985	Mera Jawab	Suresh/Solanki Patwardhan Lal	
1986	Palay Khan	Palay Khan	
1986	Mera Dharam	Jai Singh Sehgal	
1986	Haathon Ki Lakeeren	Lalit Mohan	
1986	Dahleez	Chandrashekhar	
1986	Allah Rakha	Allah Rakha aka Iqbal Anwar / Don Jr.	Dual role
1986	Karma	Baiju Thakur	
1987	Mard Ki Zabaan	Rajesh/Vijay	
1987	Jawab Hum Denge	Inspector Jai Kishan	
1987	Diljalaa	Munna Babu	
1987	Sadak Chhap	Shankar	
1987	Kaash	Ritesh Anand	
1987	Kudrat Ka Kanoon	Dr. Vijay Verma	
1987	Uttar Dakshin	Raja	
1987	Daku Haseena	N/A	
1988	Falak	Vijay Verma	
1988	Aakhri Adaalat	Nitin Sinha/Jai Kishan	
1989	Sachche Ka Bol Bala	Nandi	
1989	Ram Lakhan	Inspector Ram Pratap Singh	
1989	Parinda	Kishan	Filmfare Award for Best Actor
1989	Main Tera Dushman	Kishan Shri Vastav	
1989	Kala Bazaar	Kamal	
1989	Hum Bhi Insaan Hain	Kishanlal	
1989	Tridev	Ravi Mathur	
1989	Sikka	Jai Kishan 'Jackie'	
1989	Vardi	Jai/Munna	
1990	Pathar Ke Insan	Inspector Karan Rai	
1990	Jeene Do	Suraj	
1990	Baap Numbri Beta Dus Numbri	Ravi	
1990	Doodh Ka Karz	Suraj	
1990	Azaad Desh Ke Gulam	Inspector Jai Kishen/Jamliya	
1991	Hafta Bandh	Inspector Bajrang Thiwari	
1991	Izzat	Siddharth	
1991	100 Days	Kumar	
1991	Saudagar	Vishal	Guest appearance
1991	Akayla	Shekhar	
1991	Lakshmanrekha	Vickram/Vicky	
1992	Sangeet	Sethuram	
1992	Prem Deewane	Ashutosh Singh	
1992	Laat Saab	Ravi Mathur	
1992	Dil Hi To Hai	Harshvardan / Govardan	Dual role
1992	Angaar	Jai Kishan / Jaggu	
1992	Police Officer	Inspector Jai Kishan / Ram	Dual role
1992	Sapne Sajan Ke	Himself	Guest appearance
1993	King Uncle	Ashok Bansal	
1993	Antim Nyay	Inspector Jai Kishan	
1993	Khalnayak	Inspector Ram Kumar Sinha	Nominated—Filmfare Award for Best Supporting Actor
1993	Hasti	Jai Kishan	
1993	Aaina	Ravi Saxena	
1993	Roop Ki Rani Choron Ka Raja	Ravi Verma	
1993	Gardish	Shiva Sathe	Nominated—Filmfare Award for Best Actor
1993	Shatranj	Dinu	
1994	Chauraha	Chootu/ Amar	
1994	1942: A Love Story	Shubhankar	Filmfare Award for Best Supporting Actor
1994	Stuntman	Bajrang	
1995	Trimurti	Shakti Singh	
1995	Milan	Raja	
1995	Dushmani: A Violent Love Story	Jai Singh	
1995	God and Gun	Vijay Prakash	
1995	Rangeela	Raj Kamal	Filmfare Award for Best Supporting Actor
1995	Ram Shastra	Inspector Ram Sinha	
1996	Talaashi	Jai Kishan	
1996	Return of Jewel Thief	Johnny / Jatin Kumar	
1996	Bandish	Ram Ghulam / Kishan	Dual role
1996	Agni Sakshi	Suraj Kapoor	Nominated—Filmfare Award for Best Supporting Actor
1997	Vishwavidhaata	Ajay Khanna	
1997	Share Bazaar	Jai	
1997	Shapath	Inspector Kishan	
1997	Border	Wing Commander Anand "Andy" Bajwa	
1997	Aar Ya Paar	Shekhar Khosla	
1998	Tirchhi Topiwale	Himself	Cameo
1998	Badmaash	Gautam Hiraskar	
1998	Hafta Vasuli	Yeshwant	
1998	Jaane Jigar	Jai Kishan	
1998	2001: Do Hazaar Ek	Insp. Anil Kumar Sharma	
1998	Ustadon Ke Ustad	Jai Kishan Aka King Crown	
1998	Yugpurush	Ranjan	
1998	Kabhi Na Kabhi	Jaggu	
1998	Yamraaj	Kishan	
1998	Bandhan	Thakur Suraj Pratap	
1999	Sirf Tum	Pritam, auto-rickshaw driver	Cameo
1999	Laawaris	Advocate Anand Saxena	
1999	Kartoos	Jay Suryavanshi	
1999	Phool Aur Aag	Jaswant	
1999	Ganga Ki Kasam	Jay Singh	
1999	Hote Hote Pyar Ho Gaya	Police officer Arjun	
1999	Kohram	Maj. Rathod	Special appearance
1999	Aaag Hi Aag	Ravi	
2000	Gang	Gangu	
2000	Jung	Inspector Veer Chauhan	
2000	Refugee	Raghuvir Singh	
2000	Mission Kashmir	Hilal Kohistani	Nominated—Filmfare Award for Best Performance in a Negative Role
2000	Kahin Pyaar Na Ho Jaaye	Tiger	
2001	Hadh: Life on the Edge of Death	Vishwa	
2001	Farz	Gawa Firozi	
2001	Censor	Naseeruddin Shokh	
2001	Grahan	Jaggu	Also Producer
2001	One 2 Ka 4	Javed Abbas	
2001	Albela	Prem	
2001	Yaadein	Raj Singh Puri	Nominated—Filmfare Award for Best Supporting Actor
2001	Bas Itna Sa Khwaab Hai	Naved Ali	
2001	Lajja	Raghu	
2002	Mulaqaat	Javed Khan	
2002	Pitaah	Ramnarayan Bharadwaj	
2002	Kya Yehi Pyaar Hai	Dr. Kamlakar Tiwari	
2002	Devdas	Chunnilal	Nominated—Filmfare Award for Best Supporting Actor
2002	Agni Varsha	Paravasu	
2002	3 Deewarein	Jagdish "Jaggu" Prasad	
2003	Baaz: A Bird in Danger	Jai Singh Dabral, the Mayor	
2003	Ek Aur Ek Gyarah	Maj. Ram Singh	
2003	Boom	Abdul Wahab Barkatali Al Sabunchi 50/50 aka Chotte Mia	Also producer
2003	Samay: When Time Strikes	Amod Parekh	Cameo appearance
2004	Aan: Men at Work	Gautam Walia	
2004	Dobara	Ranbir Sehgal	
2004	Hulchul	Balram	
2005	Tum Ho Na!	Jai	
2005	Ssukh	Gaurishankar Yadav	
2005	Kyon Ki	Dr. Sunil	
2006	Divorce: Not Between Husband and Wife	Jackie	
2006	Bhoot Unkle	Bhoot Unkle	
2006	Apna Sapna Money Money	Carlos	
2006	Bhagam Bhag	J.D. Mehra	
2006	Naksha	Bali	
2006	Eklavya: The Royal Guard	Rana Jyotiwardhan	
2006	Mera Dil Leke Dekho	Mr Chaddha	
2006	Maryada Purushottam		
2006	We R Friends		
2006	Vidyaarthi	Ranveer	
2007	Aur Pappu Paas Ho Gaya	Sudhakar Chauhan	
2007	Fool N Final	Gunmaster G9	
2007	God Only Knows	Himself	Special appearance
2008	Halla Bol	Himself	Special appearance
2008	Dhoom Dadakka	Himself	Guest appearance
2008	Humsey Hai Jahaan	Gary Rosario	
2008	Thodi Life Thoda Magic	MK	
2008	Mukhbiir		
2008	Hari Puttar: A Comedy of Terrors	Uncle DK	
2009	Raaz – The Mystery Continues	Veer Pratap Singh	Special appearance
2009	Ek: The Power of One	CBI Krish Prasad Savte	
2009	Kirkit	Ritchie Rich	
2009	Anubhav	Ibrahim Vakil	
2009	Kisaan	Dayal Singh	
2009	Veer	King of Madhavgarh	
2009	Teen Patti	Tony Milano	Special appearance
2009	Malik Ek	Sai Baba	
2010	Ek Second... Jo Zindagi Badal De?	Mr. Vikram Sehgal	
2010	Mussa - The Most Wanted	Jai Kishan Shroff (himself)	
2010	Hum Do Anjaane		
2010	Bhoot and Friends	Bhanu Pratap Singh	
2011	Satrangee Parachute	Police officer	
2011	Bhindi Bazaar	Corrupt cop	Cameo appearance
2011	Chargesheet	Mahesh	
2011	Cover Story	Home Minister	
2011	Shraddha In the Name of GOD		
2011	Ek Tha Soldier	Jackie	
2012	Married 2 America	Pratap Singh	
2012	Daal Mein Kuch Kaala Hai	Police Inspector Fatke Maar	
2012	Life Ki Toh Lag Gayi		
2013	Shootout at Wadala	Police commissioner	Cameo appearance
2013	Aurangzeb	Yashvardhan	
2013	Dhoom 3	Iqbal Haroon Khan	
2013	Mahabharat	Duryodhan	Voice role
2013	Super Model		
2013	Uss Paar		Short film
2014	Gang of Ghosts	Babu Hatkata	
2014	Happy New Year	Charan Grover	
2014	Kahin Hai Mera Pyar	Art Dealer	
2015	Brothers	Garson Fernandes	
2015	Chehere		
2015	Dilliwali Zaalim Girlfriend	Minochi	
2015	Jazbaa	Home Minister Mahesh Maklai	
2015	Makhmal	Javed	Short film
2015	Dirty Politics	Mukhtiar Khan	
2016	Housefull 3	Urja Nagre	
2016	Chalk n Duster	Himself	
2016	Freaky Ali	Bade Bhai	Cameo
2017	Sarkar 3	Michael Vallya (Sir)	
2017	Khujli	Girdharlal	Short film; Won- Filmfare Award for Best Actor
2017	Shunyata		Short film
2018	Phamous	Shabhu Singh	
2018	Paltan	Maj. General Sagat Singh	
2019	Total Dhamaal	GPS	Cameo; Voice role
2019	Raat Bhaki Baat Bhaki	Prakash	Short Film
2019	Romeo Akbar Walter	Shrikant Rai	
2019	Bharat	Gautam Kumar	
2019	Saaho	Narantak Roy	Shot simultaneously in Telugu
2019	The Devil's Daughter	Devil	Indian-Iranian co-production
2019	Prassthanam	Badshah	
2020	Baaghi 3	Charan Chaturvedi	
2021	Hello Charlie	M. D. Makwana/Mac	Prime Video Release
2021	Radhe	Avinash Abhyankar	
2021	Sooryavanshi	Omar Hafeez	
2022	Rashtra Kavach Om	Dev Rathore	
2022	Atithi Bhooto Bhava	Makhan Singh	Zee5 film
2022	Phone Bhoot	Atmaram Dhyani	
2022	Life's Good	Rameshwar	
2022	Mili	Adam Latchman	Special Appearance
2023	Mast Mein Rehne Ka	Kamath	Prime Video Film
2024	Singham Again	Omar Hafeez	
2024	Baby John	Babbar Sher	
2025	Housefull 5	Chief Inspector Baba	
2025	Tanvi the Great	Brig. Joshi	
2025	They Call Him OG	Narantak Roy	Special appearance as Narantak Roy (1 min); shared universe with Saaho
2025	Tu Meri Main Tera Main Tera Tu Meri	Amar Wardhan Singh	
2026	Krishnavataram Part 1: The Heart (Hridayam)	Priest	Cameo appearance
2026	The Great Grand Superhero	Jagdish Chandra	
2026	Welcome to the Jungle	Zatara	
2026	Kaali Kheti		

== Tamil ==
Year	Movie	Role	Ref.
2010	Aaranya Kaandam	Singaperumal	Ananda Vikatan Cinema Awards for Best Villain
2014	Kochadaiyaan	Raja Mahendran	Voiceover
2017	Mupparimanam	Himself	Guest appearance
2017	Maayavan	Major Sathyan	
2019	Bigil	J. K. Sharma	
2022	Rendagam	Adiga	
2023	Jailer	Kamdev	Cameo
2024	Quotation Gang Part 1	Mustafa	
2025	Good Bad Ugly	Babel	
2026	Jailer 2	Kamdev	Cameo

== Telugu ==
Year	Movie	Role	Ref.
2006	Astram	Kadir Wali	
2008	Black & White	CBI officer	
2009	Bank		
2011	Sakthi	Jackie Varma	
2011	Panjaa	Bhagavan	
2019	Saaho	Narantak Roy Nandan	Shot simultaneously in Hindi
2025	They Call Him OG	Narantak Roy Nandan	From the universe of Saaho (Cameo)

== Bengali ==
Year	Movie	Role	Ref.
2005	Antarmahal	Bhubaneswar Chowdhury	
2007	Raat Porir Rupkatha		
2009	Sesh Sanghat	D.I.G	
2010	Jai Baba Bholenath		
2013	Swabhoomi		
2015	Love in Rajasthan		
2018	Jole Jongole	Scientist	

== Marathi ==
Year	Movie	Role	Ref.
2009	Rita	Salvi	
2012	Hridayanath	Sadashiv Sawant	
2012	Janmantar		
2015	3:56 Killari		
2015	Shegavicha Yogi Gajanan		

== Kannada ==
Year	Movie	Role	Ref.
2006	c/o Footpath	Chief minister	
2010	Zamana	Ramakanth Tyagi	
2012	Anna Bond	Charlie	
2012	Aa Marma		
2014	Amanusha		

== Malayalam ==
Year	Movie	Role	Ref.
2007	Athisayan	Sekharan	Honour Special Jury Award - Asianet Film Awards
2011	Platform No. 1	Mahendran	
2015	ATM		
2022	Ottu	Adiga	
TBA	Chila Nerangalil Chilar		Post-production; Delayed

== Punjabi ==
Year	Movie	Role	Ref.
2011	Mummy Punjabi	Kanwal Sandhu	
2013	Lucky Di Unlucky Story	Fateh (Jackie Dada)	
2017	Sardar Saab	Sardar Saab	
2020	Jagga Jiunda E		

== Bhojpuri ==
Year	Movie	Role	Ref.
2004	Hum Haeen Khalnayak	Arjun	
2009	Balidaan	Khan bhai	

== Konkani ==
Year	Movie	Role	Ref.
2017	Soul Curry	Musician	Best Actor Award at Goa State Awards
2019	Kantaar	Jordan Marcus	

== Gujarati ==
Year	Movie	Role	Ref.
2018	Ventilator	Jagdish Mandalia/Jaggu	

== Odia ==
Year	Movie	Role	Ref.
2013	Daha Balunga	Arun Singh Deo	

== Television ==
Year	Series	Role	Notes	Ref
2010	India's Magic Star	Judge		
2019	Criminal Justice	Mustafa		
2021	OK Computer	Pushpak Shakur		
2021	Call My Agent: Bollywood	Himself	Guest	
2023	Hunter Tootega Nahi Todega			

== Music video appearances ==
List of music video credits
Year	Title	Performer	Ref.
2022	"Har Ghar Tiranga"	Asha Bhosle, Sonu Nigam, Devi Sri Prasad	
