= Luis Bachan =

Comedian and actor (born 1962)

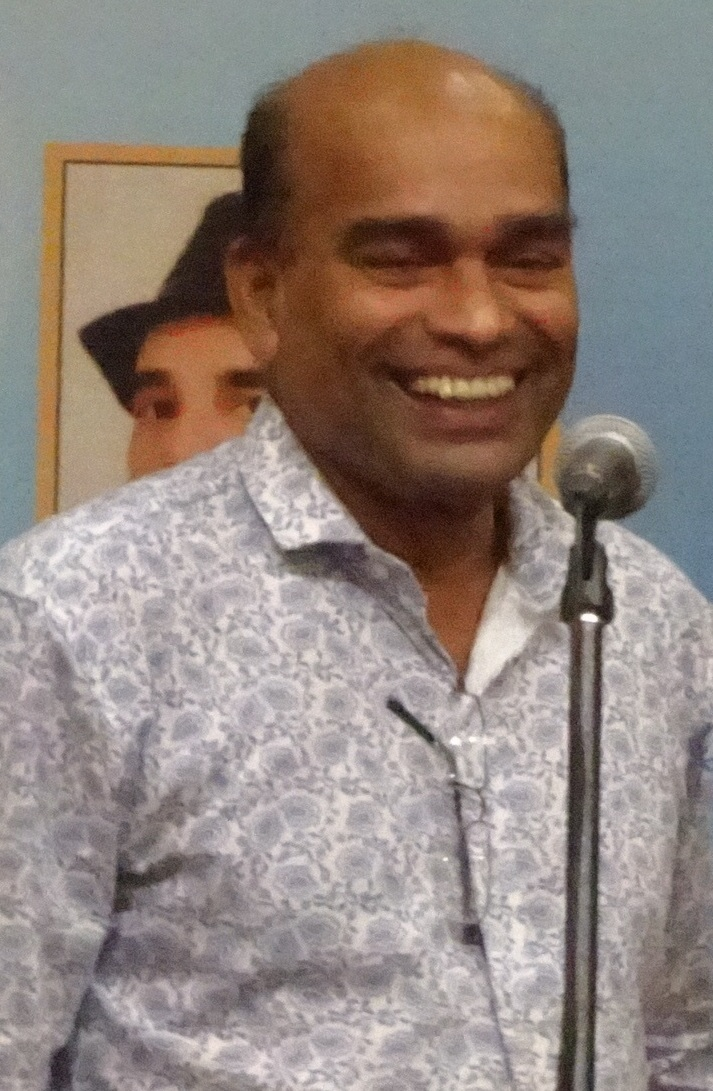
- Coelho at Institute Menezes Braganza, 2018
- Born: Luis Caitano Coelho; 5 February 1962 (age 64); Bandora, Goa, India
- Other names: Luis B
- Occupations: Comedian; actor; singer
- Years active: c. 1999–present
- Known for: Home Sweet Home; Home Sweet Home 2; Kantaar (2019)
- Spouse: Iria Rodrigues (m. 1994)
- Children: 2
- Relatives: Comedian Domnic (brother)
- Website: facebook.com/luisbachan.coelho

Luis Caitano Coelho (born 5 February 1962), known professionally as Luis Bachan, is a comedian, actor, and singer based in Swindon, United Kingdom. He is known for his work in Konkani films and tiatr (theatre) productions.

== Early life ==
Luis Caitano Coelho was born on 5 February 1962 in Bandora, Goa, India.

== Career ==
Coelho has been involved in several Konkani films and theatrical productions in recent years. In December 2014, he was cast in the Konkani film Home Sweet Home, directed by Swapnil Shetkar. The following year, in December 2015, he reprised his role in the sequel to this film, titled Home Sweet Home 2. In May 2015, Coelho was cast in the tiatr (a form of Goan theater) Mhaka Tuji Goroz (I Need Your Aid), directed by his brother, Comedian Domnic. In this production, Coelho played the lead character of Climax, who was described by a critic from the local newspaper O Heraldo as a "comedic and likeable role." The critic also observed that the characters created by Domnic and Coelho were fundamentally strong, appealing, and occasionally displayed a subtle sense of humor.

Coelho has made several appearances in the tiatr theatrical tradition. In June 2015, he was cast in the tiatr production Mhozo Sangati Tho (He's My Companion), which was directed by Patrick Dourado. In this performance, Coelho portrayed a comedian, starring alongside his brother Comedian Domnic and Comedian Sally. Coelho's work in this tiatr production was praised by critics. Just a few months later, in August 2015, he was cast in another tiatr, titled Bailek Dukh, Kumarik Sukh (Wife's Pain, Mistress's Happiness), which was written by Conception de Tuem. Once again, Coelho took on a comedic role, this time performing alongside an ensemble that included Comedienne Joana, Jane, and Humbert. The collaborative efforts of the cast in this tiatr were also well received.

In August 2015, Coelho was cast in the tiatr production Osleo Suno (Such Daughter-in- laws), directed by Tony de Ribandar. In this play, he portrayed the comedic character of Derefent, performing opposite Comedienne Janet as a comic couple. He shared the stage with other comedic performers, including Comedian Sally and Dorothy. Two months later, in November 2015, Coelho was cast in an unnamed tiatr, where he played a comedian alongside his brother, Comedian Domnic. The following year, in November 2016, he was cast in the Konkani film War-Onn by Mozin Travasso. In this production, Coelho took on comic roles alongside actors Kenny and Comedian Nato.

In May 2017, Coelho was cast in the tiatr Kevpachim Bavlim Nhoi (Not a Toy to Play) produced by Mini Mario. In this production, he portrayed a comedian, performing alongside other well-known Goan artists such as John D' Silva, Regina, Bladwin, and Jack de Colva. A critique published in the local newspaper O Heraldo highlighted that the actors were engaging, but the humor lacked originality during the performance. The following year, in July 2017, Coelho was cast in another tiatr titled Go To Hell produced by Milagres de Chandor. In this production, he played a comic role, performing alongside other comedic actors including Comedian Selvy, Comedian Richard, and Comedian Nato.

== Personal life ==
Coelho has a close relationship with his older brother, Comedian Domnic, who is also a Konkani comedian and actor.

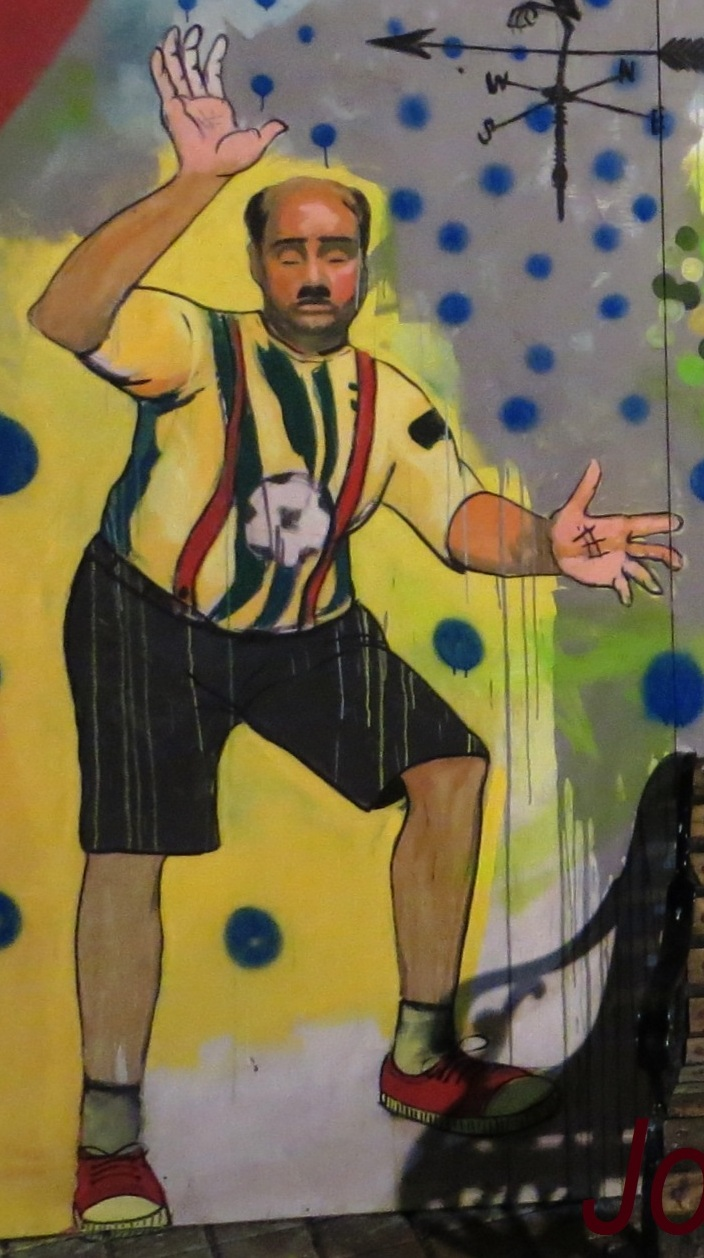
An artwork dedicated to Coelho during the 44th IFFI

Coelho has provided significant support and involvement in his brother's work within the Konkani theatre scene. He resided in the Muxer, Bandora neighborhood of Goa as of 2012. Coelho later relocated to Swindon, UK, where he is currently based. He frequently traveled to his home state Goa to work on Konkani films like Fotting No.1 (2022) directed by Joywin Fernandes and tiatr productions such as Past is Past (2023) by Comedian Agostinho.
