= Succurine Fizardo =

Indian businesswoman and former comedian (born 1950)

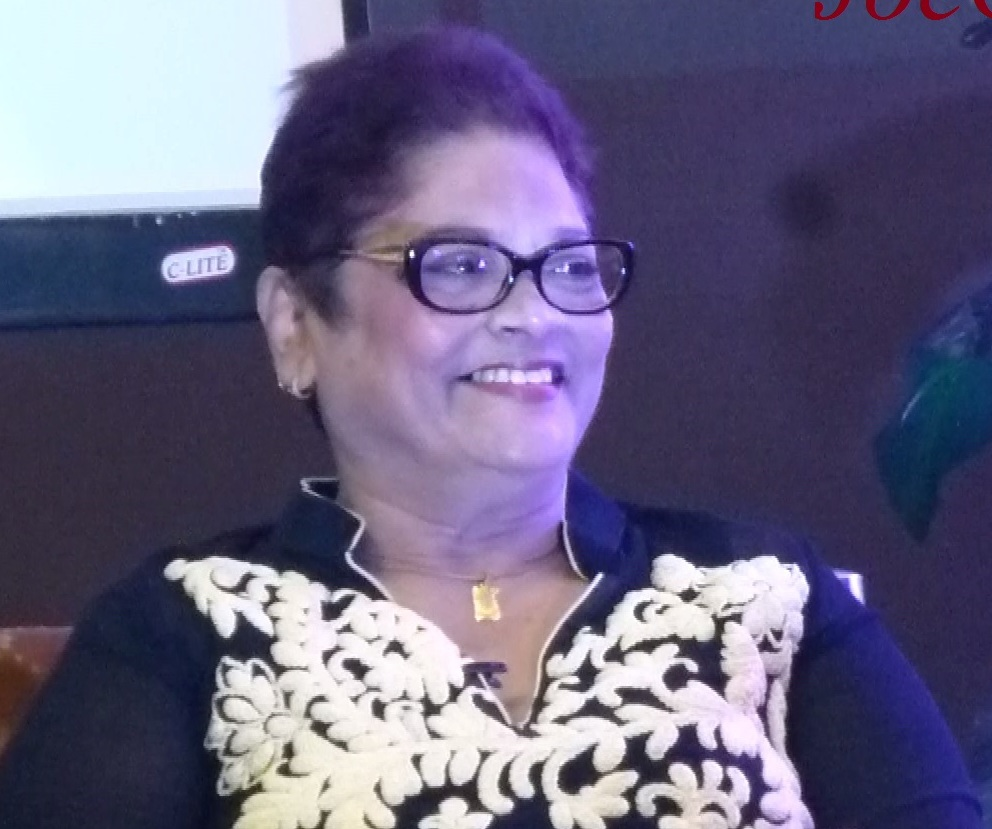
- Fizardo at Institute Menezes Braganza, 2016
- Born: Socorrinha D'Mello; 31 August 1950 (age 75); Bombay, Bombay State (now Mumbai, Maharashtra), India
- Other names: Succrine
- Occupations: Businesswoman; comedian; actress; singer; dancer
- Years active: 1968–2010s
- Children: 2
- Website: facebook.com/hsbzns.babnnz

Socorrinha "Succurine" Fizardo (née D'Mello; born 31 August 1950), also known mononymously as Succurine, is an Indian businesswoman, former comedian, actress, singer, and dancer known for her work in Hindi films and tiatr productions.

== Early life ==
Fizardo was born as Socorrinha D'Mello on 31 August 1950 in Bombay, which was then part of Bombay State (now Mumbai, Maharashtra). Fizardo's ancestral roots originated from Ribandar, Goa. As a youth, Fizardo was a member of the church choir at Our Lady of Fatima Church in the Sewree area of Bombay. Around the age of 14, she was afforded the opportunity to demonstrate her vocal abilities by participating as a singer in the church choir. Ligorio "Leo" D'Mello, Fizardo's father, pursued a career as a lyricist and actor within the entertainment field, while Natalina Fernandes, her mother, resided with the family in Sewree. Ligorio held the position of a foreman at the Hindustan Lever company, where he orchestrated theatrical skits accompanied by songs to generate funds in support of the church. At 16 years old, Fizardo's singing talent captured the attention of tiatrist Saib Rocha, who, impressed by her vocal abilities, encouraged her to consider pursuing a career in tiatr, a traditional form of Konkani theater.

Fizardo first came to prominence when she was discovered by Rocha, a popular figure in the Goan tiatr theatrical tradition. Rocha was impressed by Fizardo's vocal prowess and foresaw her as a promising talent capable of achieving fame in the realm of tiatr performance. As a result, Rocha offered Fizardo the opportunity to join one of his tiatr productions as a singer. Fizardo showcased her talent in her inaugural performance within Rocha's tiatr production by presenting a solo act named "Puja". The lyrics of the song were written by David Fernandes, who was an acquaintance of Fizardo's father. Fizardo's rendition of the song was well-received, further reinforcing Rocha's assessment of her abilities. Recognizing the potential in Fizardo, her father, Leo, decided to write songs that would highlight her talents. The first of these compositions was a piece called "Maim Babdi Garib," which drew inspiration from Fizardo's own family life. Initially, Fizardo was hesitant to perform this song, as it hit close to home, but she eventually agreed to do so.

== Career ==
Fizardo as a Konkani entertainer was known for her versatility as both a singer and actress. According to literary critic Wilson Mazarello, Fizardo had a "distinct ability to breathe life into her performances, regardless of the medium". Mazarello states that whether Fizardo is singing or portraying a comedic role on stage, she'd elicit laughter and enthusiastic audience reactions, often earning encore performances for her musical numbers. The critic notes that Fizardo is one of the few female solo vocalists within the Konkani theatrical tradition who is able to draw such fervent responses from her audiences. Mazarello praises Fizardo's presentation of both songs and comedic characters. The critic describes her as a "natural comedienne, capable of delivering portrayals of even intoxicated personas". In addition to her acting work, Fizardo was responsible for creating and overseeing the development of her own theatrical productions known as tiatrs. She has also released solo audio recordings and provided vocals for projects by other Konkani producers. Beginning in the mid-1990s, Fizardo expanded her work into the Hindi film industry, taking on playback singing roles. She has also been known to emulate the singing style and visual persona of the Konkani performer M. Boyer during live performances.

Fizardo has sustained the tradition of featuring her father's humorous songs in her performances, believing in their popularity and positive reception by audiences over the years. She emphasized that her father's compositions possessed significant depth and strength, with the verses flowing into one another. Additionally, she was known for her distinctive talent in captivating audiences and eliciting encores with her comedic song renditions, and established a reputation for her engaging performances. Leo, the father of Fizardo, was known for crafting songs of considerable length, with compositions featuring up to eight verses and eight choruses. Fizardo's performances were enhanced by her ability to interpret the elaborate and witty compositions to suit her distinct style and captivate her audiences. Her professional career began in 1968, when she joined the theatrical productions (known as tiatrs) of director Prem Kumar. After showcasing her talents in both comedic and musical roles, Fizardo's career took a significant turn following Prem Kumar's demise. Subsequently, she became a member of director C. Alvares' ensemble, initially focusing on singing before transitioning into comedic performances. In another endeavor, Fizardo's father, Leo, ventured into playwriting and directing with his debut drama named Poileo Char Vostu, featuring Fizardo in a prominent role.

Fizardo had an extensive career in Konkani theater. Throughout her career, she has collaborated with several popular figures in the Konkani performing arts scene. She has shared the stage with several established Konkani tiatrists, or Konkani theater artists, including M. Boyer, Jacinto Vaz, Alfred Rose, Kid Boxer, and Joe Rose, among others. Commencing her journey in amateur theatre, Fizardo made her debut in the Konkani theater production Devacho Vhodd Upkar under the direction of tiatrist Mariano Fernandes. She collaborated with Fernandes for an extended duration before transitioning to the troupe led by Comedian Domnic, where she worked under his guidance for several seasons. Furthermore, she demonstrated her skills in performances within tiatrs overseen by directors such as Samuel Carvalho, John Moraes, and various others. These experiences also opened doors for international tours. In addition to her acting work, Fizardo was known for both her comedic and musical performances. Her concluding stage performance took place in the tiatr Serkar under the direction of Samuel Carvalho. Furthermore, she engaged in several musical productions alongside H. Britton in Mumbai and Mangalore. Before retiring from her career, Fizardo had the opportunity to perform alongside well-known Mangalorean singers including Henry D'Souza, Victor Consecio, and Jerome D'Souza on the musical stage.

Fizardo is also known for her work in the tiatr theater tradition of Mumbai, India. Despite reduced stage appearances in recent times attributed to family responsibilities, she persists in her commitment to advancing and safeguarding Konkani culture and language through her artistic presentations. One of Fizardo's strengths is her talent for comedy. She was discovered and encouraged to explore this facet of her abilities by director Prem Kumar. In her comedic debut in Kumar's tiatr Khotto Poiso, Fizardo first showcased her talent by captivating the audience with a character who comically struggled with speaking English accurately. In a subsequent theatrical performance directed by Kumar, titled Peleachea Vostuchi Axea Korun Naie, she displayed her command of the Marathi language, showcasing her linguistic abilities. Over the course of her career, Fizardo has acted in tiatrs by various popular Konkani dramatists, including M. Boyer's Sounsar Sudorlo, Alfred Rose's Angounechi Vokol, and C. Alvares Goencho Mog. She has taken part in an exclusively female tiatr production titled Khuincho Sakrament? and has collaborated with other popular figures in Konkani theater such as Remmie Colaço, Kid Boxer, H. Britton, Young Menezes, and Robin Vaz, demonstrating her involvement in the Konkani theater scene such artists. In addition to her stage work, Fizardo is involved in the ownership and management of three beauty parlors in Dubai, in partnership with her daughter Zilma. These business responsibilities have restricted her availability to resume full-time commitments on the tiatr stage. However, she continues to maintain an active presence in the local Konkani community. Appearances encompass performing at a range of events, from minus tracks at birthday celebrations to First Holy Communion ceremonies, wedding anniversaries, and the customary "roce" ceremony, a prevalent ritual in Mumbai.

Over the course of her career, Fizardo has collaborated with several popular performers, including M. Boyer and Jacinto Vaz in the past, as well as Luis Bachan in the present era, showcasing her talents as a comedienne. Fizardo has expressed a deep attachment to the tiatrs art form, stating that her life would be meaningless without it and that she aspires to continue her artistic endeavors until the end of her life. She has released three commercial audio CDs, titled Pixem, Bach ke Rehna, and Barbie Doll. While her father was initially her primary composer, Fizardo now collaborates with Edwin D'Costa, who has written several songs for her, though he may choose to release them posthumously, states Fizardo. In addition to her solo recordings, her vocal talents have been featured in a diverse range of approximately 200 CDs crafted by different directors and producers. As a performer, Fizardo has showcased her performances across several regions, with a significant focus on the Gulf area, including Dubai, Doha, Qatar, and Kuwait. She has also taken her talents to international stages, performing in countries like Germany, London, and Canada.

== Personal life ==
In 1995, Fizardo lived with her family in Parel, Bombay (now Mumbai). By 2012, she had moved to Malad West, Mumbai, as noted in the 2012 Directory of Tiatr Artistes. Fizardo's husband, a civil engineer, was working with the Oman Army in 2005. Their daughter Zilma oversees their beauty parlour business in Dubai, while their son Abbey pursued a singing career primarily in Hindi films.

=== Personal views ===
In the context of the prevalence of vulgarity in contemporary comedy within the tiatr genre, Fizardo emphasizes the integrity of her own comedic style, characterized by meaningful content, the use of respectable language, and a lack of vulgarity. Fizardo contrasts her approach by highlighting that while she and her contemporaries possessed a talent for comedy, many modern comedians are trained, resulting in the rapid dissemination of low-quality humor. Furthermore, Fizardo expresses concern over a perceived lack of respect among emerging tiatrists towards seasoned performers and peers in the industry. This disregard for traditional values and etiquette, according to Fizardo, contributes to a decline in audience engagement with tiatr performances.
