= Epitácio Pais =

Indian writer and novelist (1924–2009)

- Born: 1924; Batim, Goa, Portuguese India
- Died: 2009 (aged 84–85)
- Occupations: Short story writer, Novelist

Epitácio Délio Pais (1924–2009) was an Indian short story writer and novelist who wrote in Portuguese.

== Early life and career ==
Born to a bhatkar, or landowning family, Pais was a primary school teacher by profession. He attended liceu, or high school, in Portuguese before undergoing his teacher training. He contributed short stories in Portuguese to newspapers such as Diário de Goa and O Heraldo from the 1950s to the 1980s. He also participated in the Portuguese-language programme Renascença, which ran on All-India Radio until the 1980s. For José Pereira, Pais was "one of Goa’s prominent writers of fiction in Portuguese". For Manuel de Seabra and Vimala Devi, Pais was a writer who felt the world around him in all his poetry and tragedy and whose writing was reminiscent of Russian writers like Turgenev and Korolenko.

== Os Javalis de Codval ==
A collection of Pais's stories was published in Lisbon in 1973 by Editorial Futura under the title Os Javalis de Codval.

=== Themes ===
Several key themes recur in the short narratives contained. One subject is matrimony, a particularly prevalent topos in Lusophone Goan writing for the discussion of caste identities and social mores. In stories such as “Ferdinando,” “De Mal a Pior” or “Um Diário e Duas Cartas” these perennial machinations are depicted within the context of a society undergoing deep social shifts that render these compacts even more fraught. Another subset of tales focuses on the breakdown of traditional rural society, featuring Hindu characters in the main and striking a similar tone to Pundalik Naik’s Konkani-language novel Upheaval, perhaps the most prominent Goan novel to deal with this subject. These stories include “Uma Filha da Terra” and “Munu.” The third subgroup is represented by “Os javalis de Codval,” “O navio encalhado,” “História de minas,” “Outra história de minas” and “No comboio.” All of these narratives involve in some way a journey out into uncertainty, a setting forth in search of wealth, security or merely sustenance that ends in some sort of reversal. Both the journeys and the conditions under which they are undertaken resonate with the social, economic and political changes occurring in Goa at the time in which the stories are set.

== Unpublished Stories ==
At his death, Pais left behind a dozen uncollected stories. It is unclear whether they had been broadcast or published in the written press in some form. These stories extend Pais's concerns beyond 1973.

In 2003, the story "Um Portuguese em Baga" (A Portuguese in Baga) was published in the Portuguese-Language anthology of Goan writing "Onde O Moruoni Canta", which deals subtly with questions of identity in a post-colonial Goa.

== Preia-Mar ==
Pais left behind a novel in Portuguese which was published posthumously by Goa, 1556 under the title Preia-Mar in 2016. The novel follows the trajectory of a young Goan named Leo. From a privileged yet impoverished family, Leo tries to strike it rich by any means possible in the Goa of the 1970s. Moving through various strata representative of the society of his times – new ascendant classes linked to smuggling, mining and politics, hippies tired of the West in search of drugs and spirituality, the fishermen of the coast and repatriates from Idi Amin’s Uganda, the novel reaches a climax that defies local tradition even as it calls into question the principles of the new order.

== Bibliography ==
- Epitácio Pais. Os Javalis de Codval. Lisbon: Editorial Futura, 1973.
- Epitácio Pais. Preia-Mar. Saigão, India: Goa, 1556, 2016.
- Epitácio Pais. "Um Português em Baga", in Alberto de Noronha (ed.) Onde O Moruoni Canta. Goa: Third Millennium, 2003.

== Translations into English ==
- Paul Melo e Castro. Lengthening Shadows. Saligão, India: Goa, 1556, 2016
- Weeds in the Red Dust: The Collected Stories of Epitácio Pais, trans. Paul Melo e Castro. Margão, India: CinnamonTeal, 2024
