= Leopoldo da Gama =

Portuguese journalist and writer (1843–1929)

- Born: Leopoldo Copriano Gama c. 1843; Saligão, Goa, Portuguese India
- Died: 27 April 1929 (aged 85–86); Penha de França, Goa, Portuguese India
- Other names: L.C. Gama
- Education: Latinidade and Portuguese School
- Occupations: Journalist; writer
- Years active: 1874–1917
- Known for: Assertive style of argumentation in polemical writings

Deputy Postmaster General of Portuguese India, Goa
- In office 12 December 1874 – unknown

Leopoldo Cipriano da Gama (born Leopoldo Copriano Gama; c. 1843 – 27 April 1929) was a Portuguese journalist and writer who was active during the era of Portuguese India. He was one of the notable contributors in the Portuguese weekly newspaper called A Convicção. Through his articles, he skillfully conveyed his humanistic education, ensuring that the Portuguese content he presented to readers was thoughtfully organized and devoid of excessive, unprocessed facts.

In his book titled Goa and Its Future, published in 1966, author Sarto Esteves acknowledges the individuals that made significant contributions to the field of journalism. Da Gama, Dada Vaidya Hari Vithal Desai, Liberio Pereira, and Luís de Menezes Bragança were among the respected figures who achieved prominence within the journalistic landscape.

According to Sushila Sawant Mendes, a journalist associated with O Heraldo, da Gama, Menezes Bragança, António de Noronha, Pascoal Gomes, João Barreto, Minguel Caetanco Dias, Bernardo da Costa, and António Gregório de Costa played significant roles as influential figures within their community. These individuals were instrumental in upholding the liberal Portuguese legacy and exerted considerable influence over their own people.

== Early life ==
Leopoldo Copriano Gama was born in c. 1843 in Saligão, Goa, Portuguese India, during the Portuguese Empire (now in India) to Luis Antonio Gama and Carlota Guilhermina Gonsalves. He was an alumnus of the Latinidade and Portuguese School for boys in Saligão, which was established by Fr. Lazaro de Souza and was among the first four Government Public Schools in Goa. This educational institution had a specific focus on teaching Latin and Lyceum classes.

Described as possessing quick thinking and a spirited nature, da Gama exhibited a broad cultural knowledge and expressed himself with precision. According to J. Clement Vaz, da Gama's command of classical literature was unparalleled, and he demonstrated a profound understanding of significant works in French and English literature.

== Style ==
Da Gama's literary style was described by Luís de Menezes Bragança as follows: He was a true journalist, possessing quick mental agility, a strong fighting spirit, and a diverse range of knowledge. His articles consistently revealed his humanistic education. Additionally, his skill in portraying history was remarkable. He had the ability to illuminate and suggest historical events in international chronicles, drawing appropriate parallels that went beyond superficial details and delving into their profound significance and far-reaching consequences. In debates, he was both a justifier and a formidable opponent. His arguments were convincing, his sarcasm devastating, and his wit disorienting.

== Career ==
Prior to embarking on his literary pursuits, da Gama rose to prominence through his service as a government official within the Portuguese Government. In accordance with historical records found in The Journal of the Bombay Branch of Royal Asiatic Society, which was published in 1875, da Gama assumed the position of Deputy Postmaster General of Goa, Portuguese India, on 12 December 1874, around the age of 30–31.

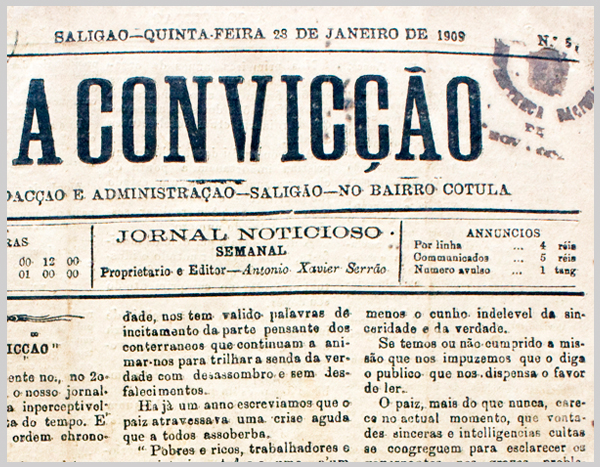
The fifth issue of A Convicção published on 23 January 1909.

During the late 19th century, da Gama directed his focus towards producing literary works in the Portuguese language. He made his debut in the literary world through his contribution to "A Convicção," (The Conviction) a weekly magazine that originated in his native town of Saligão in 1887. The magazine, under the editorial guidance of Francisco Salvador Pinto, Gustavo Adolpho de Frias, Paschoal João Gomes, and da Gama, published its inaugural edition on 15 January 1887.

Da Gama relocated from Goa to Bombaim (now Mumbai) in 1891 with the purpose of dedicating himself to his literary pursuits. His endeavors primarily involved editorial work for weekly newspapers. During this period, da Gama became a member of the Sociedade de Geografia de Lisboa, a Portuguese scientific society headquartered in Lisbon. As a C class member, he joined a diverse community of intellectuals, journalists, and politicians from various corners of the globe.

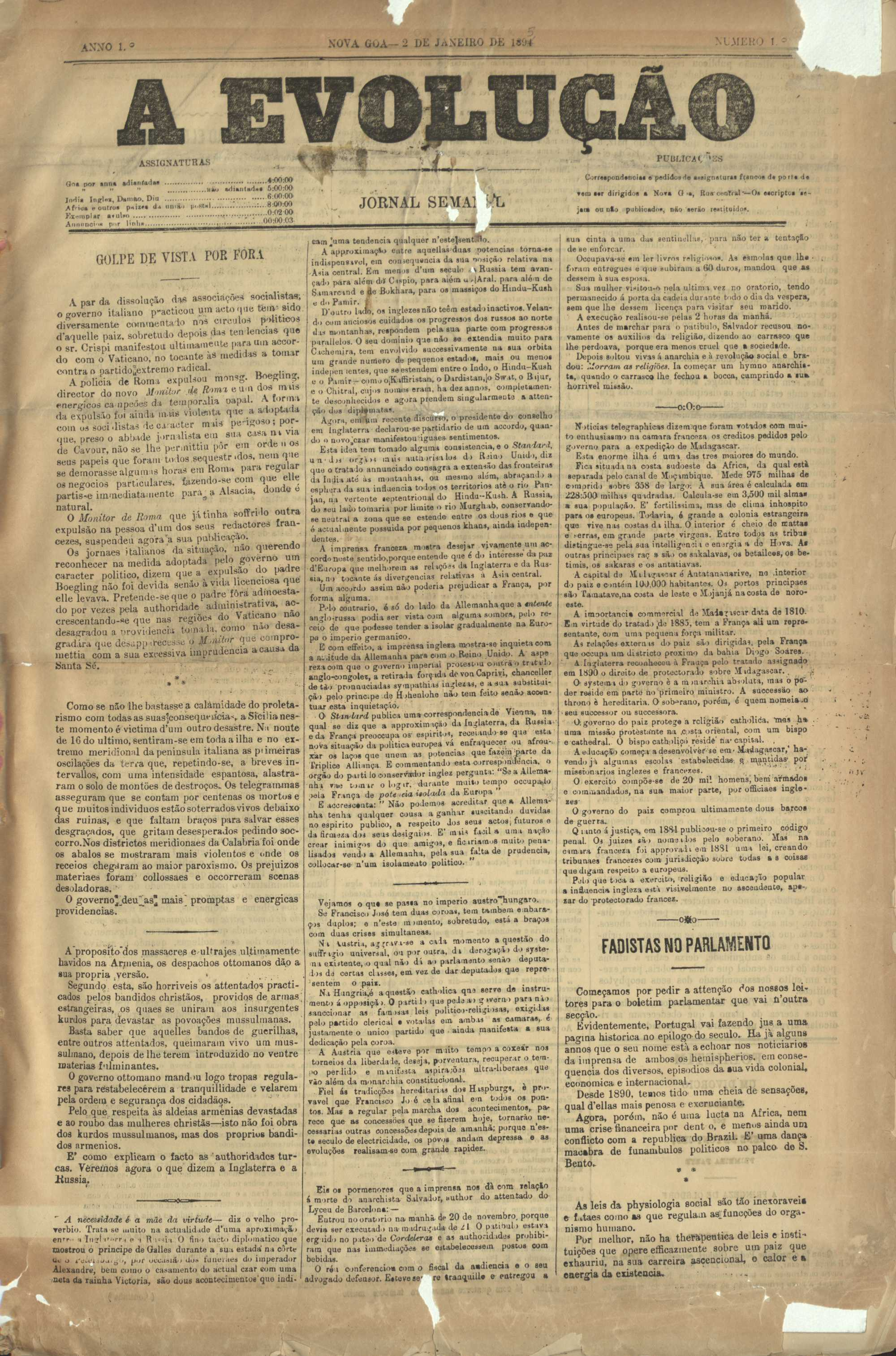
The first issue of A Evolução published on 2 January 1895.

Between 1890 and 1891, da Gama engaged in editorial activities for the weekly newspaper "Horas Vagas" (Vacant Hours) alongside Julio Ribeiro. Subsequently, from 1891 to 1892, da Gama assumed the role of editor for another weekly newspaper known as "A Colonia Goana" (The Goana Colony). Following these endeavors, da Gama returned to Goa and commenced his writing contributions to the weekly newspaper "A Evolução" (The Evolution). The first issue was published in Nova Goa (now Panaji) on 2 January 1895. However, the same year on 13 November, the newspaper was suspended, with its last 31st issue.

Da Gama was a notable contributor to Gazeta da India, a weekly periodical that served as a public journal and was published in Candolim in 1893. Over the course of its publication, the journal released a total of 73 issues, with the first one appearing in February and the final issue being published on 4 August. Initially, the content of the journal was authored by Francisco Pinto up to issue number 15, after which da Gama took over as the primary writer. The editing responsibilities for Gazeta da India were undertaken by Roberto da Nazareth.

In the latter part of his professional journey, da Gama assumed the role of director for a prominent political and literary news weekly called "Vida Nova" (New Life). The publication was first launched in 1913 in the town of Mapuçá and was overseen by the editor, Mazone Rozo da Gama. Spanning a duration of four years, from 1913 to 1917, the periodical comprised a total of 196 issues. The archives documenting the existence of this publication are housed at the Biblioteca Geral da Universidade de Coimbra in Coimbra, Portugal.

== Personal life ==
Da Gama was a polemicist known for his assertive style of argumentation. Through his convincing arguments, incisive sarcasm, and disorienting humor, he often left his opponents at a disadvantage. According to Vaz's writings, his opponents frequently found themselves intellectually challenged and unable to effectively respond. Da Gama demonstrated a willingness to appreciate and acknowledge individuals who embraced alternative perspectives on life and the world, reflecting an open-minded approach to differing viewpoints.

During his formative years as a reader, Luís de Menezes Bragança developed a deep appreciation for the literary contributions of da Gama. Particularly, he found great delight and admiration in da Gama's articles pertaining to international politics, as well as his polemical writings published in "Horas Vagas" and later in Gazeta de India. Da Gama's writing style was characterized by its spirited nature and intellectual vigor, reflecting a resolute determination in his scholarly endeavors. On 27 April 1929, aged 85–86, da Gama died in Penha de França, Goa.

== Bibliography ==
- da Gama, Leopoldo Cypriano (1912). Luis Xavier Corrêa da Graça: apontamentos biographicos (in Portuguese). Nova Goa: Arthur & Viegas. OCLC 174391203.
