= Rajdeep Naik =

Indian actor and director (born 1975)

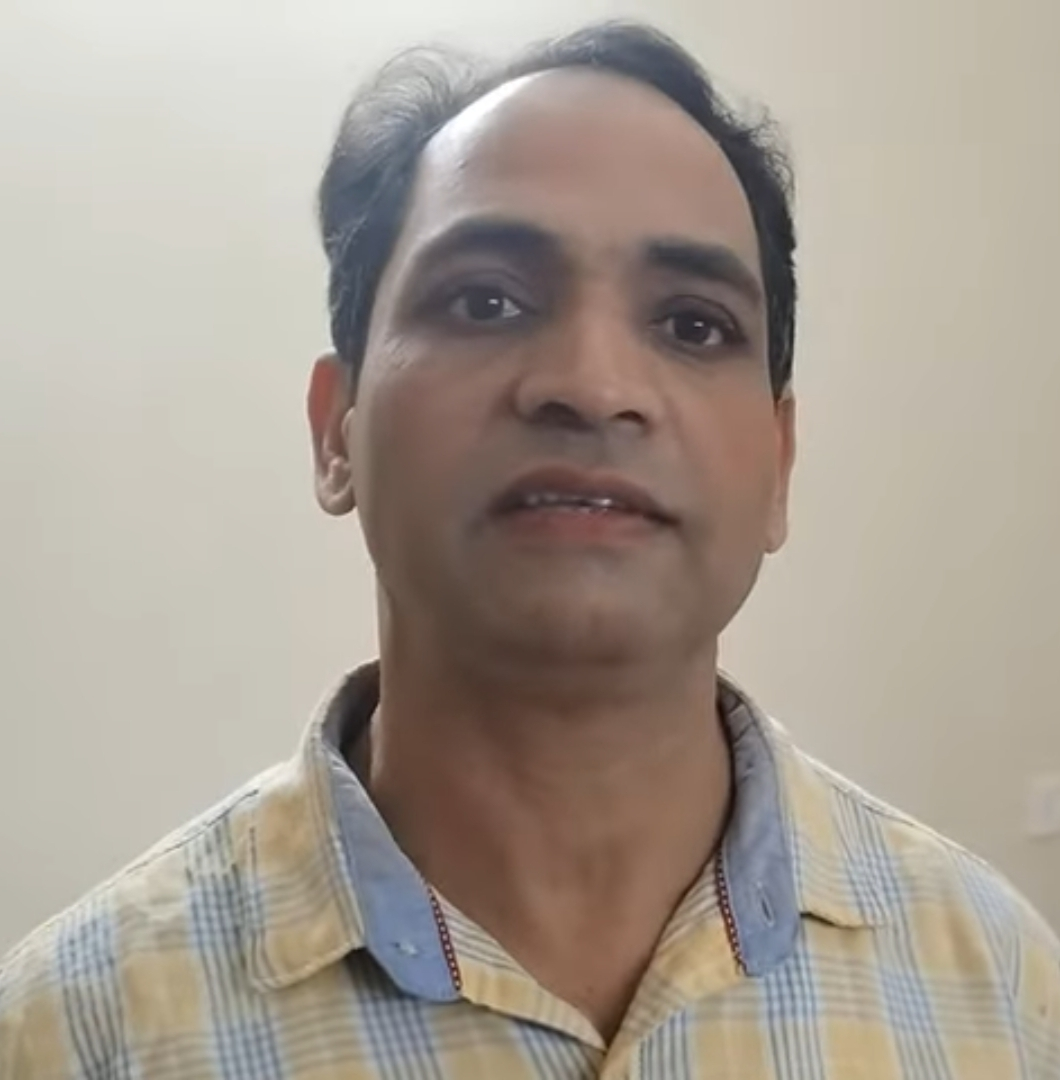
- Naik during the play Ganv Zala Zantto, 2024
- Born: Rajdeep Vasant Naik; 30 March 1975 (age 51)
- Education: Government College of Arts, Science and Commerce (B.A.); Shivaji University (M.P.A)
- Occupations: Actor; director; producer; singer
- Years active: 1986–present
- Known for: Home Sweet Home; Home Sweet Home 2
- Political party: Aam Aadmi Party (2021–2026)
- Spouse: Suchita Naik Narvekar (m. 2019)
- Children: 1
- Awards: Yuva Srujan Puraskar
- Website: facebook.com/kalachetanagoa

Rajdeep Vasant Naik (born 30 March 1975) is an Indian actor, theatre director, theatrical producer, and singer known for his work in Konkani films, nataks (dramas), and tiatr (Konkani theatre) productions.

== Early life ==
Rajdeep Vasant Naik was born on 30 March 1975. He hails from the village of Volvoi, Goa. During his schooling, Naik engaged in one-act plays from the sixth grade onwards and participated in several competitions. This pursuit continued through high school and into college. Naik's theatrical journey began at the age of 11 when he made his debut as a representative of KRS High School, Volvoi in a one-act play competition organized by Kala Academy, under the guidance of Shashikant Anvekar. He maintained an active involvement in both drama and folk dance competitions within Goa. Throughout his academic career, he received several awards and recognition for his abilities, both while attending school and as a student at the Government College of Arts, Science and Commerce, Khandola.

During his time as a university student, Naik held the position of president on the organizing committee for the inaugural student theater festival, 'Rangyatra'. In 1996, Naik completed a Bachelor of Arts degree. He later attempted to pursue a master's degree but had to leave the program after a year due to financial difficulties. Following this, he gained experience as a casual announcer for the Yuvavani programs at Akashwani, Panaji. Also, as the head of the planning committee, Naik played a key role in arranging the first-ever all-Goa student theatre convention for Konkani drama while in his final year of college.

Despite his interest in pursuing a career in dramatics and receiving support at his academic level, he struggled to find a suitable course in Goa. His liking for arts, especially literature and drama, was not matched by available opportunities in his home state. Both his immediate family and extended relatives lacked experience in stage performances and held a pessimistic view regarding the future prospects of theater. However, having a neighbor like playwright and Sahitya Akademi awardee Pundalik Naik in Volvoi exposed him to the world of drama, as he would stay up night after night to watch rehearsals. By December 2016, Naik received a Master of Arts in Konkani and was actively working towards a Master of Performing Arts at Shivaji University. As of 2021, he has obtained two master's degrees.

== Career ==
Naik is known for his early entry into the industry and subsequent contributions as a producer of tiatrs. His body of work includes several acclaimed dramas that have garnered him awards. Naik's works have been well received by the residents of Goa, and he has partnered with the Department of Art & Culture, Goa to arrange the Natya Mahotsav, a cultural event. Naik has strived to both promote and safeguard Goan culture and heritage through his artistic pursuits and performances. In July 2021, Naik became the focus of media scrutiny for speaking out against the government's decision to provide a one-time financial aid of ₹10,000 (equivalent to ₹11,000 or US$120 in 2023) to artists, deeming it as a gesture that lacked respect for the artistic community. He is also recognized as the chairman of Kala Chetna-Volvoi.

Naik's involvement in the film industry includes his portrayal of a negative character in the Konkani film Home Sweet Home in 2014. Due to its significant public demand, the film was re-released in 2016 and sought to bring attention to the problem of unauthorized land acquisition in Goa. In 2015, Naik reprised his lead role in the sequel, Home Sweet Home 2, which was widely released across Goa. The film sought to draw attention to the role of politicians in the deterioration of Goa. Another film appearance for Naik was in the Konkani film 7 Dayz in 2016, directed by Joywin Fernandes. This adventure drama, released two years later in 2018, examines the intersection of politics, crime, and corruption, showcasing their direct influence on the lives of individuals.

In 2018, Naik assumed the role of Vasudev, a member of the Gaonkar family, in the Konkani film Questão De Confusão. The film made its debut in Goa during the same year and delved into the intricacies of coexisting religions and their societal significance. The production faced significant financial challenges, necessitating innovative approaches to secure funding. One such method involved soliciting contributions from individuals prior to the film's release, with the promise of either screening the film in their respective villages or providing complimentary tickets, depending on the amount donated. The filmmakers initially underestimated the project's expenses, but as filming progressed, costs escalated, according to Naik.

The film was produced by Naik's spouse, Suchita, and he also made contributions by penning lyrics for three promotional songs associated with the film. Naik invested effort in preparing for his role, particularly in comprehending the nuances of portraying a father figure to a young child, despite not having personal experience as a parent. To establish a convincing on-screen chemistry, Naik spent a week alongside a young actor who played his son in the film. However, Naik expressed no difficulty in assuming the role of a husband to Reshma, as their extensive 18-year collaboration in stage productions had fostered an understanding between them. Similarly, Naik had previously collaborated with Anil Pednekar, another actor in the film, which facilitated a seamless working dynamic. It is worth noting that Naik also contributed to the film's production team.

=== Political career ===
In October 2021, Naik formally joined the Aam Aadmi Party (AAP) during a ceremony held in Delhi, which was attended by Arvind Kejriwal, the Chief Minister of Delhi.

Naik's decision to join the AAP was driven by his genuine belief in the effectiveness of the Kejriwal model and his conviction that it presents the most viable alternative for the state of Goa. The AAP highlighted Naik's admiration for Kejriwal's initiatives, particularly in the areas of electricity provision and job security, which left an impression on Naik. Naik's choice to align with the AAP was motivated by the pressing issue of heightened unemployment and the adverse socioeconomic impact of the pandemic on the local population. Recognizing the AAP as the political party that had demonstrated the most concerted efforts to assist the people of Goa during the pandemic, Naik expressed his satisfaction in joining the AAP under the guidance of Kejriwal. He emphasized the party's commitment to supporting the welfare of Goenkars (residents of Goa) throughout the crisis.

In March 2026, ahead of the Ponda by-election, Naik quit the party, alleging that AAP fielded a candidate that would lead to a division of opposition votes.

== Personal life ==
In 2019, Naik married Suchita Naik Narvekar (née Narvekar), an entrepreneur and playwright, after dating for 18 years. They first met in 2000 when Narvekar joined Naik's production company. In 2020, the couple welcomed a daughter, Bhumee Naik Narvekar who is a child actor and performs in Konkani dramas.
