= Epitácio =

Epitácio may refers to:

== People ==
- Epitácio Cafeteira (1924-2018), Brazilian politician
- Epitácio Pais (1924-2009), Goan Indian novelist
- Epitácio Pessoa (1865-1942), former president of Brazil

== Places ==
- Epitacio Huerta Municipality, a municipality in Michoacán, Mexico
- Presidente Epitácio, a municipality in São Paulo, Brazil
