= Comedian Domnic =

Indian comedian and actor (born 1957)

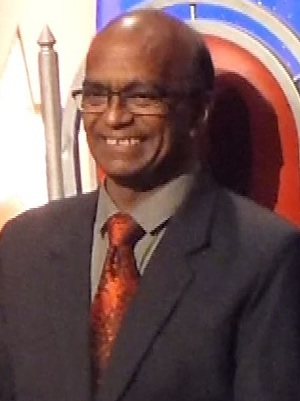
- Coelho in 2016
- Born: Domingos Gabriel Coelho; 24 March 1957 (age 68); Bandora, Goa, Portuguese India
- Other names: Domnic Coelho; Sir Domnic Coelho; Hoddo Bakru
- Occupations: Comedian; actor; singer; playwright; director
- Years active: 1986–present
- Notable work: Kantaar (2019)
- Spouse: Maria da Costa (m. 1989)
- Children: 2
- Relatives: Luis Bachan (brother)
- Website: facebook.com/domnic.coelho.5

Domingos Gabriel "Domnic" Coelho (born 24 March 1957), popularly known as Comedian Domnic or Hoddo Bakru (transl. Bald Landlord), is an Indian comedian, actor, singer, playwright, and theatre director known for his work in Konkani films and tiatr productions.

== Early life ==
Domingos Gabriel Coelho was born on 24 March 1957, in Bandora, Goa. At the time, Goa was part of Portuguese India.

During his time as a school student, Coelho, in his theatrical premiere, assumed the primary comedic role in a one-act play entitled Pope Babli Mumbai. After receiving a warm reception from the audience, he was motivated to extend his acting endeavors. Subsequently, he engaged in tiatrs, a customary type of Goan theater, at the community level in nearby villages.

== Career ==
Coelho's entry into the professional tiatr theater scene occurred later in his career compared to many of his contemporaries. While the majority of tiatrists embark on their stage careers during their youth, Coelho's initial performance on the professional tiatr stage occurred circa 1990 when he was 33 years old. During that era, the majority of tiatrs featured artists predominantly hailing from the regions of Bardez and Salcete. Prior to this professional debut, Coelho had participated in annual natak (dramatic performance) productions in the late 1970s. He subsequently shifted his focus to creating and overseeing the production of his own tiatrs, which were showcased during the yearly celebration in his native village of Muxer-Bandora, Goa situated in the Ponda taluka area. Coelho's talent caught the eye of a relative named Jackferns, who was a tiatr contractor, promoter, and businessman based in Vasco da Gama, Goa. Jackferns facilitated an introduction between Coelho and the established tiatrist Manuel Pereira, which resulted in Coelho securing a role in Pereira's 1986 tiatr production named Ghorabo (Family). Coelho engaged in two of Pereira's theatrical shows before assuming a role in Patrick Dourado's 1988 tiatr production named Nomoskar (Greetings). In addition to his initial professional experiences, Coelho took on acting roles for well-known tiatrists like Anthony San. Following this, he initiated the production of his independent commercial tiatr shows, debuting with Tum Pasun (You Too) in the year 1992.

Coelho had an extensive career in tiatr productions, in the post-1990s period, wherein he performed in tiatrs directed by some of the popular Konkani stage directors, including Patrick Dourado, Jose Rod, Prince Jacob, Roseferns, Menino de Bandar, Chris Perry, Mariano Fernandes, and John D' Silva, among others. Coelho's portrayal of the comedic character "Hoddo Bakru" in the tiatr Mauli (Gardener) directed by Jose Rod was particularly well received. The comedic persona, a thrifty landlord character known as a "bhatcar," typically seen seated in his armchair on his "balcao" or veranda, is famous for engaging in frequent quarrels with neighbors over minor matters, had become so well known that the nickname 'Hoddo Bakru' is now a lasting moniker for Coelho. Coelho's artistic endeavors extend beyond the stage, encompassing roles in a variety of VCDs (video compact discs) and full-length feature films, apart from managing the production and direction of his personal VCDs. "Since 1999, he founded his own theatrical group where he has taken on roles as a playwright, director, and producer of tiatrs that frequently examine family themes and deliver strong messages to the audience," writes Elvis Sequeira of O Heraldo. These productions are infused with humor, showcasing the lively on-stage chemistry between Coelho and his brother, Luis Bachan, who is also a popular Konkani stage comedian.

In October 2010, Coelho's tiatr Novo Suria Udetana was launched towards the end of the month. He has staged his theatrical productions both domestically and internationally over the course of his career. Coelho has performed his works extensively abroad, touring countries such as Portugal, Germany, France, Canada, the United Kingdom, and various nations in the Persian Gulf region on multiple occasions. Additionally, he has entertained audiences in various regions across multiple states in his homeland of India. In May 2016, Coelho collaborated with his brother Luis Bachan to debut a new tiatr called Ami Soglim Ek (We Are One). This theatrical presentation celebrated the roles of a housewife and a young girl child, a theme that marked a significant production in the tiatr oeuvre of Coelho, his 20th production. The ensemble cast included Priscilla as Joyce, portraying the housewife, Sonali as a childlike character, Olga as the village belle, Michael as the local administrative officer (mamlatdar), Elias portrayed the character of the headstrong son, while Rons took on the role of a vigilant officer. Anil Pednekar's portrayal brought to life the character of Pandurang, embodying the villainous essence of the role on stage, while Coelho and Luis Bachan brought to life a comedic pair of freeloaders in this performance. The siblings also contributed their vocal talents to the tiatr.

In the past, Coelho would typically produce and stage only a single tiatr per year. However, beginning in May 2016, the size and talent of the acting troupe assembled by Coelho enabled him to increase his annual tiatr output to two productions per year. Coelho has continued to write, direct, and star in new tiatr works. In December 2018, he released a tiatr titled Housewife, in which he not only assumed a comedic role but also sang. He portrayed a comedic character alongside his sibling Luis Bachan, with the comedy duo being assisted by up-and-coming amateur performers Avilla and Cassy. Coelho's comedic talents and stage presence in this production were noted by theatre critics to evoke comparisons to the popular Konkani tiatr comedian Anthony Mendes. More recently, in November 2023, Coelho premiered a new tiatr called Flying Kiss. This theatrical work focused on themes of family relationships and the importance of mutual support within a family unit, including between in-laws. The cast featured both established tiatr performers as well as newer, up-and-coming artists. As with Housewife, Coelho took on a key comedic role in the production, this time alongside other players. The ensemble featured performers such as Rosario Botelho, Priscilla, Manuel, Denzilia Menezes, Ubaldo, and Sonali Naik. Coelho took on the role of a comedian alongside Lino, Lanessa, and Joylan, as well as performing as a duo with Lino.

== Personal life ==
Coelho's younger brother, Luis, known by his stage name Luis Bachan, is also active in the Konkani entertainment scene as a comedian.

== Style ==
Coelho's tiatrs, traditional Konkani-language theater performances, typically center around subjects concerning family dynamics and interpersonal connections, steering clear of addressing political matters. In his capacity as a government employee, Coelho opts to steer away from incorporating contentious political themes in his tiatrs. He abstains from openly criticizing individuals during performances, opting to provide guidance in private if the situation necessitates it. In his tiatr writing process, Coelho first develops an outline or conceptual framework for a new work, which he then expands into a full script over the course of approximately 15 days.

Coelho chooses to input the script directly by typing it rather than writing it by hand, citing increased efficiency as the rationale for this preference. Subsequently, his acting troupe engages in an intensive 10-day rehearsal period to prepare thoroughly for the new production. A distinguishing element of Coelho's directorial approach is his focus on incorporating and training young, amateur actors in his tiatrs. He sees this as a significant challenge, as many aspiring performers, while possessing strong vocal abilities, lack experience in effective stage delivery and require guidance to develop their performance skills. Coelho demonstrates a preference for working with inexperienced young actors over established professionals, as he has found the latter to be more resistant to refining or altering their acting styles.
