= H. Britton =

Indian singer and actor (1935–2009)

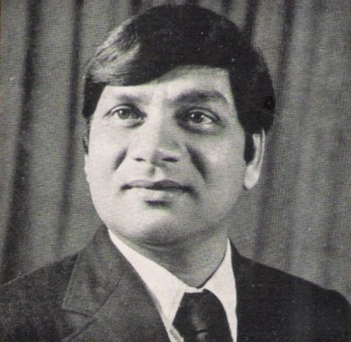
- Portrait of Camilo during his youth
- Born: Hermenegildo Camêlo; 16 October 1935; Agaçaim, Goa, Portuguese India, Portuguese Empire (now in India)
- Died: 29 September 2009 (aged 73); Penha de França, Goa, India
- Occupations: Singer; actor; lyricist; composer; director; playwright; producer
- Years active: 1960s–c. 2009
- Children: 2

Hermegildo Camilo (born Hermenegildo Camêlo; 16 October 1935 – 29 September 2009), known professionally as H. Britton, was an Indian singer, actor, lyricist, composer, playwright, director, and producer who worked on the Konkani stage. Britton is best known for portraying female characters in tiatr productions, and has also composed more than 700 songs.

== Early life ==
Hermegildo Camilo, originally named Hermenegildo Camêlo, was born on 16 October 1935 in Agaçaim, Goa, which was part of Portuguese India during the Portuguese Empire (now in India), to Francisco Camelo and Maria Augusta Cardoso who hailed from Ribandar.

Britton made a significant move to Bombay (now Mumbai) in order to pursue his acting career. During his time in Bombay, he actively engaged with different theater troupes, dedicating a major portion of his life to this city alongside his wife and two children. Although he primarily resided in Bombay, he would occasionally travel to Goa, specifically for his tiatr shows. Britton eventually decided to permanently settle in Britona, Bardez, Goa.

== Career ==
During the late 1960s, Britton participated in an annual tiatr performance, organized by the residents of Britona on the occasion of the feast of Our Lady of Penha de França. Specifically traveling from Bombay to attend the village celebration, Britton's presence was announced, generating much anticipation among the audience, which consisted of over 600 tiatr enthusiasts. The villagers held Britton in high regard, as he had not performed in a tiatr production for four years, making his return a highly anticipated event. Britton then sang a humorous song that elicited laughter from the entire audience. The crowd continuously called for an encore, expressing their admiration through applause and whistling.

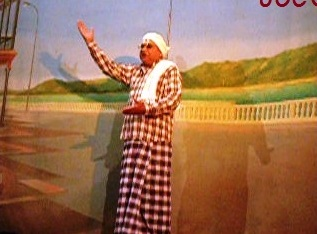
Britton during a stage performance

According to Tomazinho Cardozo, former president of the Tiatr Academy of Goa, Britton's second song was exceptional. In this performance, Britton portrayed a female character, captivating the audience with his distinctive style, including his attire, body language, gestures, and facial expressions. Cardozo describes Britton's portrayal as that of a "flawless young lady who humorously criticized the boys in her song". Despite the playful criticism, the boys in the audience enthusiastically called for Britton to return to the stage for multiple encores. Cardozo refers to Britton as "Hermegildo," as he was highly cherished by the residents of Britona during that period. It is worth noting that even though he had gained significant recognition as an artist under the name "H. Britton" on the tiatr stage in Bombay, the villagers of Britona still preferred to address him with his first name "Hermegildo." Cardozo asserts that Britton's singing, dancing, and portrayal of female characters were unique in the tiatr history, establishing him as a female artist for an extended period, despite the occasional breaks to pursue better opportunities abroad.

Britton, upon his return, came back to tiatr. Known for his vocal abilities, acting talent, and lyrical talent, his compositions were characterized by their thematic depth, clever wit, and delightful humour. Britton's composed over 700 original songs, complemented by his collaborations with tiatr artists such as M. Boyer and Jacinto Vaz. In addition to his musical contributions, he also ventured into playwriting and directing full-length tiatrs. His inaugural tiatr production, titled Ekvottachem Foll, was successful.

Among Britton's popular tiatrs that resonated with audiences were Custom Officer, Jivit Kuwaitchem (Life in Kuwait), Bebdo Put (Drunkard Son), and Bunhad Naslolem Ghor (House without Foundation). However, it was as a singer that he was known among the populace. His discography consisted of numerous albums, with songs like "Bandra Festac", "Marialina", and "Pandu Lampiaum" which grew to become classics. Cardozo writes that Britton's contribution as a "female" artist in the tiatr domain was invaluable, particularly during periods characterized by a scarcity of female performers. By assuming roles traditionally assigned to women, he played a pivotal role in preserving the vitality of Konkani tiatr, ensuring its enduring prominence as a dynamic dramatic art form in Goa.

== Style and reception ==
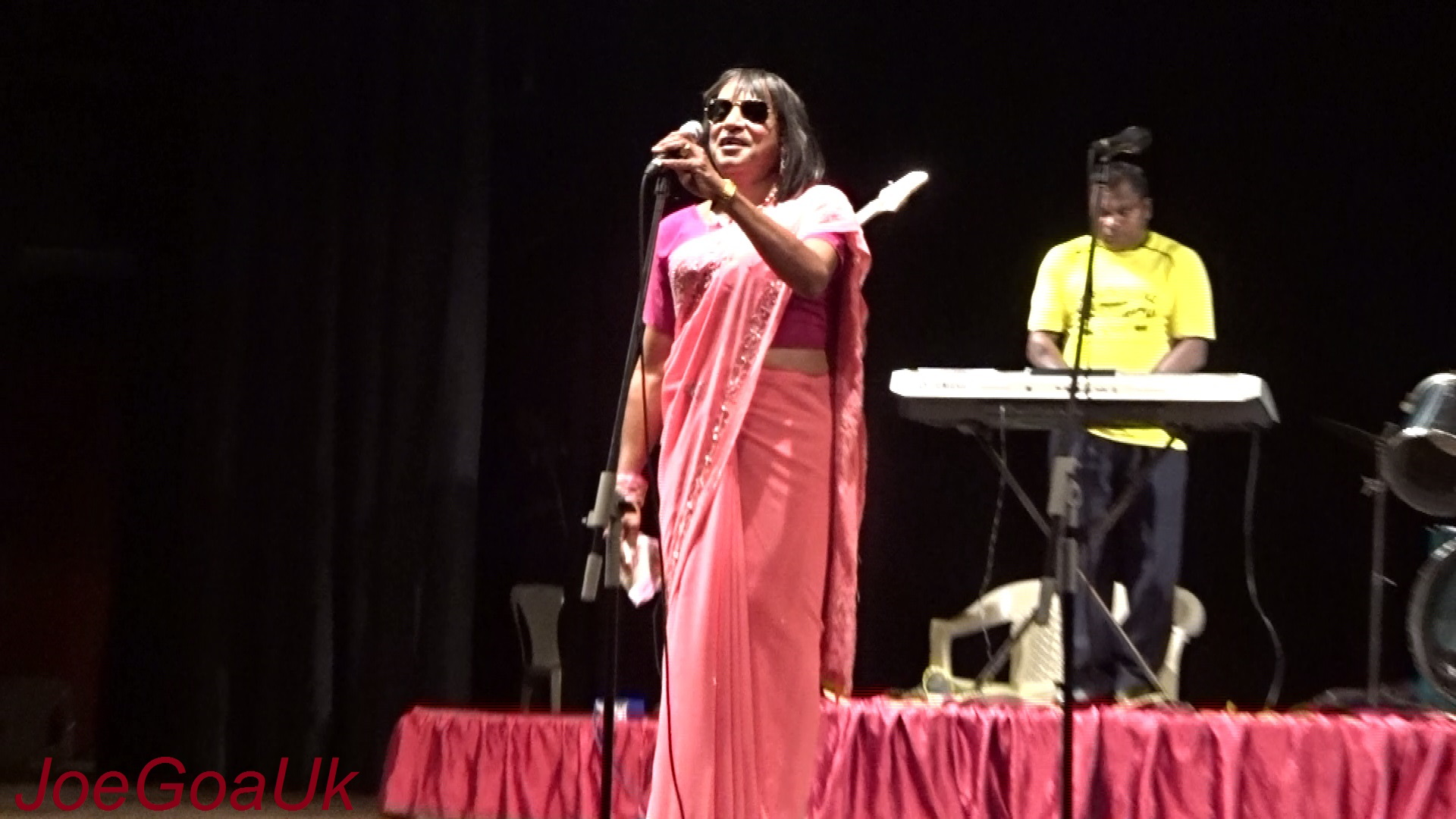
Britton's brother, T. Britton, portraying him at Kala Academy, 2016.

O Heraldo writes, "Britton left a mark on the world of entertainment with his unique artistic style and vocal talents. He excelled in the portrayal of female characters, a practice that was considered socially unconventional during the period in which he thrived. Britton's on-stage presence was characterized by his comedic persona, often evoking uproarious laughter from audiences as he donned vibrant sarees. His vocal versatility was truly remarkable, effortlessly transitioning between male and female registers with skill. Such was his mastery of female mannerisms that he occasionally prompted mistaken identity, with spectators genuinely perceiving him as a woman."

== Death ==
On 24 September 2009, Britton died at his residence in Penha de França, Goa, after a brief illness. His funeral took place three days later at Britona Cemetery. A large number of individuals gathered at Britton's residence to pay their final respects to him.

Among those who paid their last respects to Britton were prominent politicians such as Dayanand Narvekar, the MLA of Aldona, and Dr. Wilfred de Souza, the Vice Chairman of the Goa State Planning Board. Moreover, numerous personalities from the tiatr community attended the funeral. Individuals among them included Tomazinho Cardozo, the President of the Tiatr Academy of Goa, Prince Jacob, Cyriaco Dias, Sabina Alvares, Adv Mike Mehta, Anil Kumar, Bond Braganza, Jessy, Diana, Sabina Alvares, Mario Menezes, Osvi Viegas, Patrick Dourado, Xavier Paclo, Xavier Mascarenhas, C. D'Silva, Bab Andrew, Boneventur DPetro, Maestro Agnel, and Anceto Lawrenco.

=== Reactions ===
Britton was mourned by the then Chief Minister of Goa, Digambar Kamat, who expressed his condolences and acknowledged the significant loss his passing represented. Kamat recognized Britton as one of the towering personalities of Goan tiatr and lamented the void created on the Konkani tiatr stage that would be difficult to fill. He extended his sympathies to the bereaved family.

Tomazinho Cardozo, who had a four-decade-long association with Britton, praised him as a highly talented artist who had captured the hearts of the masses. Cardozo specifically highlighted Britton's portrayal of female roles and emphasized that his contributions to tiatr would be forever remembered by fellow tiatrists. In an interview, Cardozo further emphasized the profound impact of Britton's demise on the Konkani tiatr stage, describing him as one of the most gifted artistes in the field and a seasoned tiatrist. Cardozo commended Britton's five-decade-long service to the Konkani tiatr stage, noting his contribution to its development. He also lauded Britton's vocal abilities as a singer and his talents as a lyricist, with his songs characterized by wit and humor that captivated tiatr lovers in Goa and beyond. The Tiatr Academy of Goa also expressed their condolences.

Prince Jacob acknowledged Britton's artistic prowess and his ability to mesmerize audiences with his captivating voice. Jacob credited Britton with making significant contributions to the advancement of Konkani tiatr. He further acknowledged Britton's unique talent for portraying female characters, a skill seldom seen among younger artists. Jacob described Britton as a straightforward and compassionate individual, underscoring the tremendous loss his departure represented for the industry.

Cyriaco Dias highlighted Britton's multifaceted talents as a lyricist, singer, and director. Recalling their collaboration in the 1960s, Dias mentioned the admiration Britton received for his portrayal of female roles and commended his skill as a humorist.

Advocate Mike Mehta regarded Britton as a stalwart of the tiatr industry, noting his ability to select subjects for his songs that resonated deeply with the public and gained widespread popularity. Mehta mourned the loss of the stage artiste and emphasized the irreplaceable void left by Britton's departure, deeply affecting tiatr enthusiasts.

Leslie Pereira, a stage actor who had worked closely with Britton, expressed his grief, acknowledging Britton's talent in portraying female characters. Similarly, Albert Cabral expressed doubt that anyone could match Britton's expertise in dressing up and imitating women. Both Pereira and Cabral anticipated the enduring impact of Britton's absence. Theatre director Roseferns hailed Britton as a legendary figure and a cherished friend among his tiatr colleagues.

== Selected stage works ==
Year	Title	Role	Notes	Ref
1970	Ekvottachem Foll	Writer/director	Debut as writer & director	
	Custom Officer	Writer/director		
	Jivit Kuwaitchem	Writer/director		
	Bebdo Put	Writer/producer		
	Bunhad Naslolem Ghor	Writer/producer		

== Select discography ==
- Bandra Festac (1971)
- Pandu Lampiaum (1971)
- Marialina (1982)
