= Vimala Devi =

Portuguese writer and poet (born 1932)

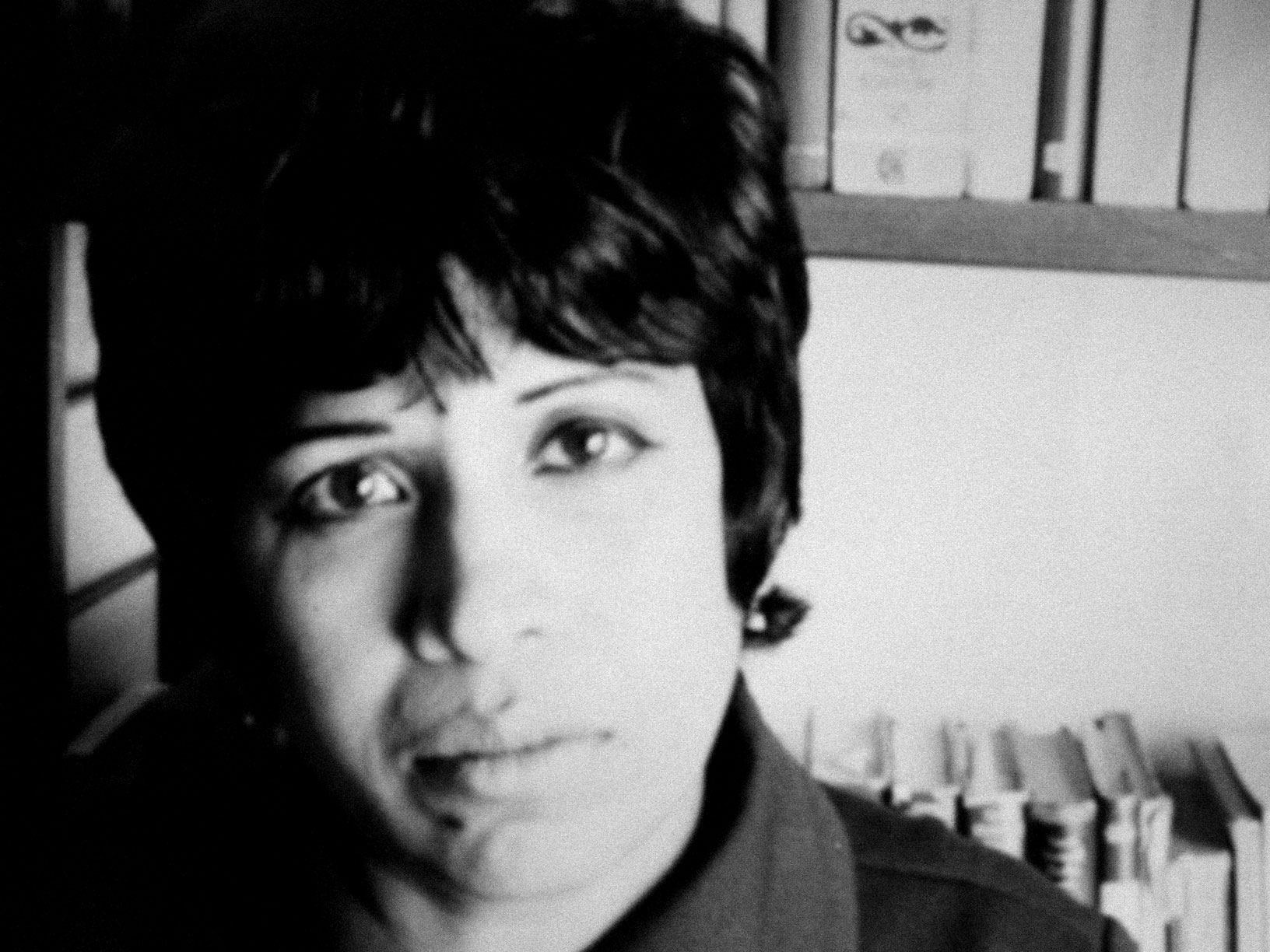
- Almeida during her youth
- Born: Teresa da Piedade de Baptista Almeida; 1932 (age 93–94); Penha de França, Goa, Portuguese India
- Occupations: Writer; poet; translator
- Spouse: Manuel de Seabra
- Writing career
- Years active: 1950s–present

Teresa da Piedade de Baptista Almeida (born c. 1932), known by her pen name Vimala Devi, is a Portuguese writer, poet, and translator. Born into an elite Goan caste of Roman Catholic Brahmins in Portuguese Goa, she settled in Lisbon, Portugal in 1957, later working as a translator, during which she adopted her pen name. In Portugal, she met her future husband, Manuel de Seabra, a fellow journalist and writer.

== Life in Goa ==
Vimala Devi was born in 1932 in the village of Britona in the parish of Penha de França, across the Mandovi river from Panjim, the principal town of Goa. At that time, large tracts of land in Britona were owned by Devi's family, which belonged to the elite Catholic Bamon or brahmin caste bhatkar landowners. The bhatkar class owned land and the labour of the mundkar class of lower-caste inhabitants in what was essentially a feudal relationship. Although this rural aristocracy was still predominant at this time, this was the period when the decline of the land-owning class first began to set in, a theme that appears in Devi's later fiction. After Goa's incorporation into India laws were passed giving the mundkar workers rights to the lands on which they had always lived and worked and abolishing their duty to provide unpaid labour to the bhatkar landowners.

As in many high caste families at the time, Portuguese was spoken at home alongside Konkani, the vernacular language of Goa. The author pursued primary studies in Portuguese and also in English, which even under the Portuguese administration was widely used by the Christian population of the territory.

=== Debuts ===
Whilst in Goa, Vimala Devi contributed articles and poetry to two of the main Portuguese-language newspapers, the Diário da Noite and O Heraldo. Whilst the former is now defunct, the latter continues to appear in an English language edition.

== Life in Lisbon ==
Na madrugada de lágrimas e de esperança
Teu pranto é o meu
De ti vem um apelo
Dolorido e ancestral
No meu pensamento serás sempre
O eterno sonho luso
Comunhão de mosteiros e pagodes
------------------------------------
On this morning of tears and of hope
Your lament is mine
From you comes a call
Pained and ancestral
In my thoughts you will always be
The eternal Portuguese dream
Communion of monasteries and pagodas

Vimala Devi: "Goa"

Vimala Devi moved to Lisbon in 1957 to rejoin part of her family already established in the city and began work as a translator. The first stage of her career as a writer is marked by a concern with bringing the world of the then-Portuguese Estado da India into representation. It was also at this time that the writer chose her pseudonym, a name that reflected a desire to project her pre-conversion Hindu identity and her desire to reflect the hopes and aspirations of both the Hindu and Catholic communities of Goa (as in the short stories of Monção where both communities share space in the same collection). Thus, for the first time in Portugal, there appeared a writer of Hindu appellation writing in Portuguese about the country's recently lost colony. In this period she published a collection of poems entitled Súria in 1962 and a book of short stories called Monção, which was written and published in 1963.

It was in Lisbon that Vimala Devi met and married her husband Manuel de Seabra, a journalist, poet and translator and a great influence on her writing.

=== Súria ===
Súria focusses on Devi's memories of India, intertwining reflections on Goa's social, economic and historical character. For Mauro Neves, who echoes the verdict of Portuguese critic João Gaspar de Simões, it is a "symbolist" work "profoundly influenced by Camilo Pessanha".

=== Monção ===
Everton Machado has described Monção as "the best portrait (alongside the novels of Orlando da Costa) of what resulted from the interpenetration of the Indian and Portuguese cultures in Goa". To some extent Devi's collection could be likened to a Goan version of James Joyce's Dubliners, insofar as the stories contained concern the constrictions placed on the lives of ordinary people located in inescapably provincial settings. A further link is the recurrence in the narrative of the epiphanic moment, so typical of Dubliners, in which the characters (or at least the reader) see clearly the nature and structure of the limitations placed upon them. In a Luso-Asian context, however, one might as easily make a comparison with the collection of short stories "Cheong-sam," by the Macanese author Deolinda da Conceição.

Some of the stories that stand out in particular in this collection are: "Nâttak," an encounter between an actor in Goan Hindu dramas and an adolescent girl, who turns out to be his half-sister; "O Genro-Comensal," about a man who returns to Goa from Mozambique to father a child for a family whose unmarried daughters had produced no heirs; "Dhruva" and "Regresso," that tell the story of a man from a lower-class background who is out of place in his family home after returning from Portugal to get a university education, and the woman who faithfully waits for him to return; and "A Droga," about a forbidden romance between a Christian girl and a Hindu boy. (Note: Most of these are translated in Paul Melo e Castro (trans.), Lengthening Shadows, 2 vols (Saligão: Goa, 1556, 2016).)

== London ==
For seven years, from about 1964 to 1971, Devi lived in London and worked as an art critic for the BBC's Portuguese-language service. It was during this period that Hologramas and Telepoemas were written. Here, far from Goa and the far-reaching transformation of Goan society into the Indian Union, Devi turns from the Goan themes and memories that animated her earlier work to a deep engagement with Western European culture and contemporary Anglophone poetry. For Mauro Neves, the period from Hologramas onwards "reflects the marked influence of Fernando Pessoa". Certainly, major influences in her work that can be felt in her work, and to which she refers directly include, Fernando Pessoa and his heteronyms, but also [T.S.Eliot] (above all The Waste Land and 4 Quartets), [W.H. Auden], Matthew Mead (principally Identities), Kingsley Amis (such as A case of samples), Alan Bold, Günter Grass, Blaise Cendrars, Paul Valéry, Cesare Pavese, Robert Creeley and other poets from the New Writing movement in the United States.

=== Hologramas ===
Tempo individual
Que se perde
No olhar de criança
silêncio cinzento
ou pergunta:
se a alma é astro
ou avatar
à distância
como a solução de Édipo
morrendo nos lábios da Esfinge
------------------------------------
Individual time
Lost
In a child's gaze
A silence of grey
Or the question:
Is the soul a star
Or an avatar
At a distance
Like Oedipus's solution
Dying on the Sphinx's lips

Vimala Devi: "Tempo Individual"

It is in Hologramas that Devi leaves behind the nineteenth-century world of colonial Goa to engage with both twentieth-century modernity and twentieth-century Western modernism. The guiding principle of the collection is the eponymous hologram, and the idea that the human mind creates mental holograms of the reality it perceives and decodes. In a sense, the poems contained are themselves holograms constructed from the interplay of several sets of three dimensions: past, present, and future; the microscopic, the human, and the cosmic; the mythological, the human, and the technological. In Hologramas, as in Baudelaire, for example, the most ancient and the most up-to-date in culture and technology clash and enter into dialogue.

=== Telepoemas ===
Este agora
ao longo de milhas
ao longo de linhas
o impulso
magnético
a falar-me
o tempo
a um tempo
em Niagara de não cessar
ao democrata
ao mundo
metropolitano de emoções
a cidade
descobrindo Charlot
com humor
ao tempo
com humor humano
penetrado
com suor de chuva
em poros de asfalto
------------------------------------

Vimala Devi: "Este Agora"

With its internationalist poems, drawing on the experiments of concretism and modern British verse, Telepoemas is a further instance of Devi's engagement with the intellectual laboratory of Europe that was partially smashed by the World Wars – "Surgia Europa/Mais Tarde surgia/Europa chorava" (Europe arose/Later Europe arose/Europe wept). One thing that distinguishes Telepoemas from the preceding collection is the increased focus on the bodily, on man and woman, as though the pendulum between the microscopic and the macroscopic had found itself at the level of the human for the instance of this collection. Like the telephone and the television that the title invoke, and which instruments helped bring about the world with which the verse engages, Telepoemas relates the sights and sounds, both inner and outer, of man and woman, nature and science as they are distanced and brought together in the routine of the city streets of its age. There is also a notable increase in focus on the painterly, with many references to European artists and a recurrent play with typesetting and the ordering of words on the page.

=== A Literatura Indo-Portuguesa ===
Financed by a grant from the Junta de Investigações do Ultramar and drawing on material from the Lisbon's Biblioteca Nacional and London's British Library, as well as more than a hundred letters exchanged with writers and intellectuals in India, Devi co-authored with Manuel de Seabra of A Literatura Indo-Portuguesa. The first volume was a ground-breaking historical account of the history and development of Portuguese-language Goan literature, supplementing the bibliographical information contained in the work of Father Filinto Dias. The second volume was an anthology of Portuguese-language Goan writing that contains many works that might well have disappeared had they not been found and preserved by Devi and Seabra, even within the broader problematic of preservation of colonial literary production during an era characterized both by Portuguese decolonization in Asia and Africa and by the decline of authoritarian rule in Portugal. In 1972, A Literatura Indo-Portuguesa was awarded the prestigious Prémio Abílio Lopes do Rego of the Academia das Ciências de Lisboa.

== Barcelona ==
In 1971, Devi returned to Lisbon. A year later she left for Barcelona, where she and branched out into writing verse in Spanish, Catalan and Esperanto, as well as doing translations of science fiction and other literature. With Seabra, Devi also composed an up-to-date Catalan-Portuguese and Portuguese-Catalan dictionary, which was published by the Enciclopèdia Catalana in two volumes.

=== Collections of poetry published in Spain from 1991 to the present day ===
==== Hora ====
The first collection of poetry Devi published in Spain was entitled Hora. Featuring poems written in Spanish, Portuguese and Catalan, within the space of Hora (with its subtly trilingual title) the three largest Iberian languages achieve a poetic co-existence and equality that has not always been permitted historically and politically.

=== A Cidade e os Dias ===
In 2008, Vimala Devi published A Cidade e os Dias (published in Catalan as La Ciutat i els dies), a distillation of the writer's over forty years of experience in several major European cities since the first publication of her last collection Monção. Using an even more stripped-down short-story format that concentrates on places and instants extracted from the flow of time and urban experience, the narratives contained in the collection explore the tensions and attitudes that have grown up in the West in the post-war period. In some ways, A Cidade e os Dias can be seen to explore similar terrain to Vimala Devi's poetry, especially in its interrogation of the rapport between art and life. Despite the tensions that run through the stories and which impact so strongly on the characters' existences – for instance those between personal relationships and economic demands—there is always a space for hope and happiness, a profound faith in the potential of humankind.

== Bibliography ==
=== Prose ===
Monção Lisbon: Dédalo, 1963 (2nd augmented edition: Lisbon: Escritor, 2003)

Translated as:

- Musono: novelaro Skövde: Al-fab-et-o, 2000. (version in Esperanto)
- Monsó. Vilanova i La Geltrú: El Cep i La Nansa, 2002. (version in Catalan)
- Monsoon. Seagull, 2019 (version in English)

A Cidade e os Dias. Lisbon: Leitor, 2008

Translated as:

- La Ciutat i els Dies. Vilanova i La Geltrú: El Cep i La Nansa, 2008. (version in Catalan)

=== Poetry ===
- Súria: poemas Lisbon: Agência-Geral do Ultramar, 1962.
- Hologramas Coimbra: Atlântida Editora, 1969
- Telepoemas Coimbra: Atlântida Editora, 1970
- Hora. El ojo de Polifemo, Barcelono, 1991. (Poetry in Spanish).
- Rosa secreta. El ojo de Polifemo, Barcelono, 1992. (Poetry in Spanish).
- El temps irresolt. L'ull de Polifem, Barcelono, 1995. (Poetry in Catalan and Portuguese).
- Pluralogo. La Kancerkliniko, Thaumiers, 1996. (Poetry in Esperanto).
- Speguliĝoj. La Kancerkliniko, Thaumiers, 1996. (Poetry in Esperanto).
- Éticas-Ètiques. Vilanova i La Geltrú: El Cep i La Nansa, 2000. (in Portuguese and Catalan).

=== Reference works ===
- A Literatura Indo-Portuguesa (with Manuel de Seabra), Lisbon: Junta de Investigações do Ultramar, 1971.
- A Literatura Indo-Portuguesa 2. Antologia(with Manuel de Seabra), Lisbon: Junta de Investigações do Ultramar, 1971.
- Diccionari portuguès-català (with Manuel de Seabra), Barcelona: Enciclopèdia Catalana, 1985.

== Translations ==
- An English translation by Paul Melo e Castro of Os Filhos de Job appeared in issue 3 of The AALITRA Review, available on-line here
- Several stories from Monção are translated in Paul Melo e Castro (trans.), Lengthening Shadows, 2 vols (Saligão: Goa, 1556, 2016)
- A full translation entitled Monsoon appeared in 2020 from Seagull Books.
