= Jackie Shroff =

Indian actor (born 1957)

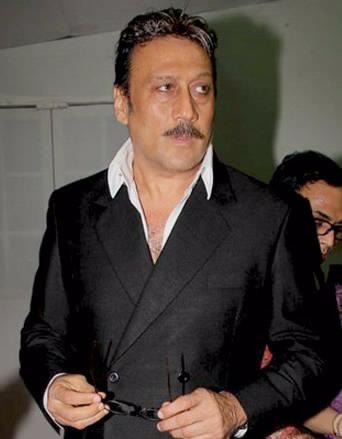
- Shroff in 2011
- Born: Jaikishan Kakubhai Saraf; 1 February 1957 (age 69); Bombay, Bombay State, India
- Other name: Jaggu Dada
- Occupation: Actor
- Years active: 1982–present
- Works: Full list
- Spouse: Ayesha Dutt (m. 1987)
- Children: Tiger; Krishna
- Relatives: Ranjan Dutt (father-in-law)

Jaikishan Kakubhai Saraf (born 1 February 1957), known by his screen name Jackie Shroff, is an Indian actor and former model who primarily works in the Hindi film industry. In a career spanning over four decades, he has appeared in 250 films in multiple languages. (Note: The 13 languages are Hindi, Tamil, Bengali, Marathi, Kannada, Telugu, Malayalam, Punjabi, Bhojpuri, Konkani, Odia, Gujarati and English, as can be verified from Jackie Shroff filmography) He has received several accolades including four Filmfare Awards.

After an uncredited small appearance in Swami Dada (1982), Shroff made his lead debut with Subhash Ghai's blockbuster actioner Hero (1983), which made him an overnight star. He went onto establish himself as a leading Hindi film actor in the 1980s and 1990s with several box office hits, such as Andar Baahar (1984), Teri Meherbaniyan (1985), Aaj Ka Daur (1985), Karma (1986), Kudrat Ka Kanoon (1987), Jawab Hum Denge (1987), Ram Lakhan (1989), Tridev (1989), Baap Numbri Beta Dus Numbri (1990), Izzat (1991), Police Officer (1992), Khalnayak (1993), Rangeela (1995), Agni Sakshi (1996), Border (1997) and Bandhan (1998). He won the Filmfare Award for Best Actor for Parinda (1989) and Filmfare Award for Best Supporting Actor for 1942: A Love Story and Rangeela.

In the 2000s, Shroff took on more supporting and negative roles in Refugee (2000), Mission Kashmir (2000), Devdas (2002), Hulchul (2004), Bhagam Bhag (2006), Apna Sapna Money Money (2006), Dhoom 3 (2013), Happy New Year (2014), Housefull 3 (2016), Bharat (2019), and Sooryavanshi (2021). Shroff has worked in films of other languages including Punjabi film Sardar Saab (2017), Konkani film Soul Curry (2017), Tamil films Bigil (2019), Jailer (2023) and Telugu film Saaho (2019).

In addition to his acting career, Shroff is an environmentalist. He is married to model and producer Ayesha Dutt, with whom he has two children, actor Tiger and entrepreneur Krishna.

== Early life ==
Shroff was born as Jaikishan Kakubhai Saraf (Note: In an interview with Mukesh Khanna, Shroff, said his surname was 'Saraf', later it became 'Shroff'.) on 1 February 1957 in Bombay (present Mumbai), Bombay State, India. His father, Kakubhai Haribhai Shroff, was a Gujarati. His mother was a Turkmen who fled the Kazakh Soviet Socialist Republic (present-day Kazakhstan) during a coup, according to Shroff. (Note: While a coup did not take place in Kazakhstan in the 20th-century, the crisis mentioned by Shroff likely to refers to any of population transfers in the Soviet Union (see also Kazakh famine of 1919–1922, Kazakh famine of 1930–1933).) His maternal grandmother escaped to Ladakh, along with her seven daughters, and migrated to Delhi, finally reaching Mumbai.

Shroff's father came from a family of merchants and traders. However, they lost all of their money in the stock market and his father had to leave home at the age of 17. His father met his mother when they were both teenagers and got married.

Shroff dropped out of junior college after finishing his 11th class. He was raised in the Teen batti locality of Mumbai. In his childhood, he fought many street fights for his friends and often got beat up. His father Kakubhai was an astrologer.

As a youngster, he modelled in a few advertisements including Savage perfumes. It was one of his classmates in school who gave Shroff his name "Jackie" and then filmmaker Subhash Ghai stuck to this name when he launched him in the film Hero. Shroff regularly revisits his childhood home in Teen Batti.

== Career ==
=== Initial work ===
Jackie Shroff dropped out of school after his 11th standard as his family did not have much money. He tried his hand working as an apprentice chef at Taj Hotels and as a flight attendant at Air India, but he was rejected from both places because of his lack of qualifications. He then started working as a travel agent in a local company called Trade Wings near Jehangir Art Gallery. An advertising agency accountant spotted him at the bus stand and asked him if he would be interested in modelling. The next day, Shroff went to the advertising agency (National advertising agency) located in the same building as Davar's college near Flora Fountain for the photo shoot during his lunch time. This photo shoot for a suit shirt launched Shroff on his modelling path. Aasha K Chandra, who was running an acting school, asked Shroff to join her class. Initially, Shroff refused, but after she said that Dev Anand's son Suneil Anand is also attending her class, Shroff enrolled there. Suneil Anand introduced Shroff to his father, Dev Anand, who gave Shroff his first acting role.

=== Films ===
In 1982, Shroff made his acting debut in Dev Anand's 1982 film Swami Dada. In his first meeting with Anand, he was offered the second lead role but after 15 days, Anand changed his mind and gave the role to Mithun Chakraborty. Shroff was cast as one of the henchmen of Shakti Kapoor in an uncredited role.

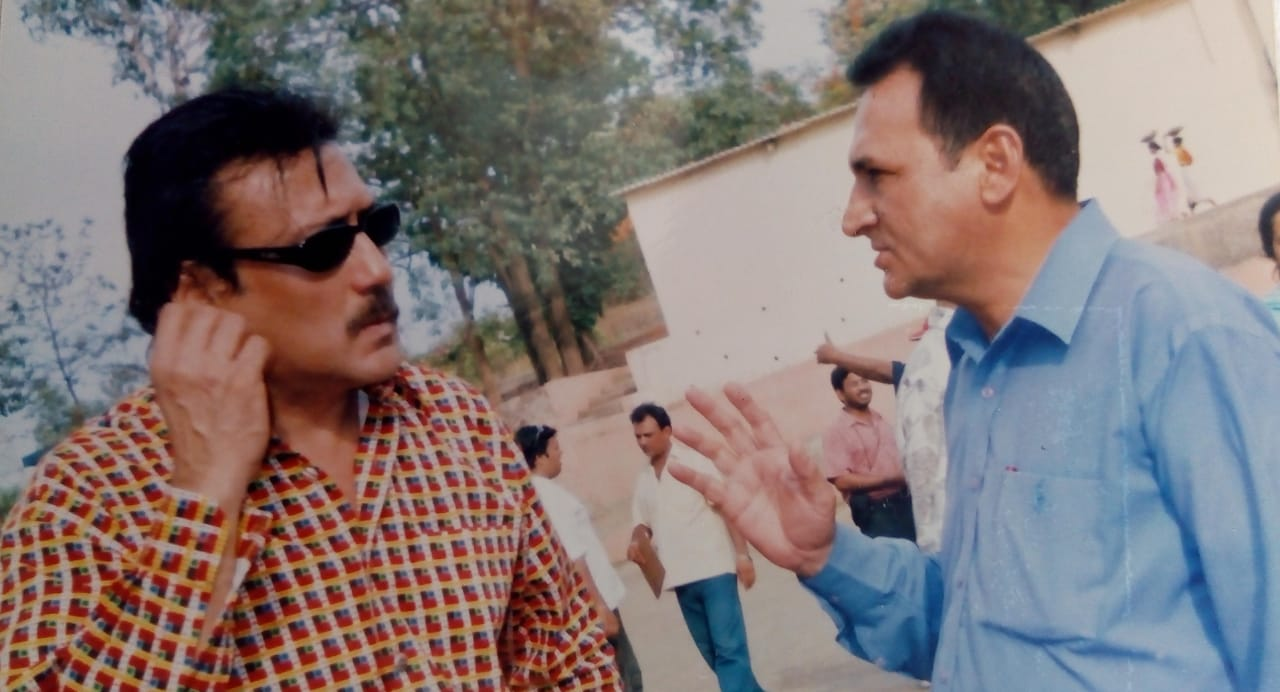
Shroff during a script narration session

In 1983, Subhash Ghai cast Shroff in the lead role for the action romance Hero, paired with Meenakshi Sheshadri. The film was a major commercial success, and one of the highest grossers of 1983. The film made Shroff and Seshadri into overnight stars. Shroff continued to work in Subhash Ghai films, irrespective of any role that was offered. After Hero, Shroff did several other films, such as Andar Baahar (1984), Jaanoo and Yudh (both released in 1985). All of these films were successful. In 1986, he was seen in Karma, which became the highest-grossing film of the year. His next film to be released was Kaash (1987). Later films, such as Dahleez (1986) and Sachché Ká Bol-Bálá (1989) failed at the box office. However, he came back to success through films such as Ram Lakhan, Tridev and Parinda (all 1989). His performance in Parinda won him his only Filmfare Award for Best Actor.

In the 1990s, he starred in successful films such as Saudagar (1991), Angaar (1992), Gardish (1993), Khalnayak (1993), 1942: A Love Story (1994), Rangeela (1995) Agni Sakshi (1996), Border (1997) and Shapath (1997). During this period, he received a nomination for the Filmfare Award for Best Actor for Gardish, and nominations for the Filmfare Award for Best Supporting Actor for Khalnayak and Agni Sakshi, winning twice consecutively for 1942: A Love Story and Rangeela.

During the 2000s, he appeared in supporting roles in Mission Kashmir (2000), which earned him his only nomination for the Filmfare Award for Best Villain, Yaadein (2001), Devdas (2002) and Hulchul (2004), earning two nominations for the Filmfare Award for Best Supporting Actor for Yaadein and Devdas. In 2006, Shroff acted in the children's film Bhoot Unkle. He played negative roles in Bhagam Bhag (2006) and Housefull 3 (2016). During this period, he also appeared in two Marathi films.

In 2010, he appeared in the film Bhoot and Friends. In 2011, he appeared in a cameo role in the film Shraddha In The Name Of God directed by Gurubhai Thakkar.

In 2017, Shroff made his debut in Konkani, acting in the film Soul Curry, which earned him the Goa State Award for Best Actor. Subsequently, he acted in another Konkani film released in 2019, titled Kantaar.

In October 2018, he acted in a short film, The Playboy Mr. Sawhney. He was also seen in Paltan (2018). He features in many films in 2019 like Firrkie, Bharat, Saaho, and Romeo Akbar Walter. He is also going to star in Prasthanam, which Hindi remake of Telugu film with same name alongside Ali Fazal and Sanjay Dutt.

He next appeared in Housefull 5 in 2025. The film features an ensemble cast including Dino Morea, Akshay Kumar, Abhishek Bachchan, Riteish Deshmukh, Sanjay Dutt, Fardeen Khan, Shreyas Talpade, Nana Patekar, Jacqueline Fernandez, Nargis Fakhri, Chitrangada Singh, Sonam Bajwa, Soundarya Sharma, Chunky Pandey, Nikitin Dheer and Johnny Lever.

=== Television ===
Shroff has hosted many television shows like Lehrein, Chirtrahar and Missing. Dealing with stories of missing people who were never found, Missing was popular for its creative narration by Shroff. The show was broadcast on Sony TV, of which he owned some shares. Shroff was also a judge on the magic show India's Magic Star, broadcast on Indian channel STAR One. The show began on 3 July 2010 and ended on 5 September 2010. In 2014, Shroff and his son Tiger Shroff made an appearance on Comedy Nights with Kapil. In 2019, Shroff made his digital debut with the series Criminal Justice.

=== Dubbing ===
Film title	Actor	Character	Dub Language	Original Language	Original Year Release	Dub Year Release	Notes
Bhola Shankar	Chiranjeevi	Bhola Shankar aka Shankar	Hindi	Telugu	2023	2023	

== Personal life ==
Shroff married his longtime girlfriend Ayesha Dutt, a model who later became a film producer, on 5 June 1987, her birthday. The couple runs a media company Jackie Shroff Entertainment Limited. They jointly owned 10% shares in Sony TV from its launch until 2012, when they sold their stake and ended their 15-year-long association with Sony TV. They have two children - son, actor Tiger Shroff (born 1990) and a daughter, entrepreneur and filmmaker Krishna Shroff (born 1993).

Shroff's personality rights were maintained by the Delhi High Court in 2024, which forbade the use of his name, image, or even nicknames without his consent.

=== Social activism ===
Shroff owns an organic farm where he grows organic plants, trees and herbs. He is also the brand ambassador of Thalassemia India and over the years has supported many causes like HIV/AIDS awareness and abolishment of female foeticide. He has also funded the treatment and education of many underprivileged children. On 5 March 2021, Shroff donated an ambulance to a Lonavala-based animal shelter in the memory of his late pet dog Rocky.

== Awards and accolades ==
- 1990: Won: Filmfare Award for Best Actor – Parinda
- 1994: Nominated: Filmfare Award for Best Actor – Gardish
- 1994: Nominated: Filmfare Award for Best Supporting Actor – Khalnayak
- 1995: Won: Filmfare Award for Best Supporting Actor – 1942: A Love Story
- 1996: Won: Filmfare Award for Best Supporting Actor – Rangeela
- 1997: Nominated: Filmfare Award for Best Supporting Actor – Agni Sakshi
- 2002: Nominated: Filmfare Award for Best Supporting Actor – Yaadein
- 2001: Nominated: Filmfare Award for Best Performance in a Negative Role – Mission Kashmir
- 2003: Nominated: Filmfare Award for Best Supporting Actor – Devdas
- 2007: Special Honour Jury Award for outstanding contribution to Indian cinema
- 2011: Won: Vikatan Awards for Best Villain – Aaranya Kaandam
- 2014: Won: The Original Rockstar GQ
- 2016: Won: HT Most Stylish Living Legend Award.
- 2017: Won: Raj Kapoor Special Contribution Award – Received by actress Raakhee: 30 April 2017.
- 2017: Won: Received the 20th anniversary of JP Dutta's Border movie Award: 12 June 2017.
- 2017: Won: Recipient of National Award-Hindi Cinema Gaurav Samman at Vigyan Bhawan
- 2018: Won: Filmfare Short Film Award for Best Actor — Khujli
- 2018: Won: Best Actor Award for the Konkani film Soul Curry at Goa State Awards ceremony

He has received a Doctor of Arts for his valuable contribution in the field of Cinema from the Invertis University.
