= Kantaar =

2019 Indian film in Konkani

- Directed by: Nilesh Malkar
- Written by: Nilesh Malkar
- Produced by: Janet Noronha
- Starring: Jackie Shroff; Ester Noronha; Noel Sean
- Music by: Aaditya Barve
- Production company: Janet Noronha Productions
- Release date: 28 January 2019 (Margao)
- Language: Konkani

Kantaar (transl. Song) is a 2019 Indian Konkani-language film written and directed by Nilesh Malkar and produced by Janet Noronha. It stars Jackie Shroff, Noel Sean and Ester Noronha. The film is about life in Goa, and finding purpose in life. After the award-winning Soul Curry, it is Malkar and Jackie's second Konkani film. The musical film features Lorna singing some jazz songs. It premiered at Ravindra Bhavan, Margao, on 28 January 2019.

== Plot ==
Angie (Ester Noronha) is burdened with a sister, Sandy, who is a victim of kidney failure. Soon after, her father (Alfred Fernandes) dies unexpectedly, leaving Angie to take care of her mother (Liby Mendonca). Angie, burdened with sadness and helplessness, decides to commit suicide. However, she is stopped by Jordan Marcus (Jackie Shroff), a musician and part-time insurance agent.

With Jordan's help, Angie begins to turn her life around. She falls in love with Anthony (Noel Sean). Liby accompanies Sandy to the hospital, while Angie begins to sell bread in the village.

== Cast ==
- Jackie Shroff as Jordan Marcus
- Ester Noronha as Angie
- Liby Mendonca as Angie's mother
- Alfred Fernandes as Angie's father
- Noel Sean as Anthony
- Meena Goes
- Antonette de Souza
- Spirit as security guard
- Luis Bachan
- Comedian Domnic

== Production ==
The film was shot in August 2018 in locations in the interiors of Goa like Rachol, Benaulim and Colva in South Goa. Being a musical film, it features a lot of experimental Konkani songs, especially some jazz numbers sung by Lorna. Two of the leads, Noel Sean and Ester Noronha, are known for their singing skills. Together, they had both sung a Konkani version of Despacito. Noronha has previously sung a song for Nachom-ia Kumpasar. The film also features various tiatrists like Luis Bachan, Domnic, Comedian Sally and Velrose Pereira. The film has received support from Entertainment Society of Goa (ESG) Vice-chairman Rajendra Talak.
