= Aleixo Clemente Messias Gomes =

Portuguese journalist (1873–1957)

Aleixo Clemente Messias
- Born: 11 January 1873; Pangim, Goa, Portuguese India
- Died: 27 June 1957 (aged 84); Pangim, Goa, Portuguese India
- Occupations: Journalist; teacher; writer
- Known for: Founder of O Heraldo

Aleixo Clemente Messias Gomes (11 January 1873 – 27 June 1957), better known as Prof. Messias Gomes, was a Portuguese secondary school teacher, writer, journalist, author of several works on historical themes and founder of the daily O Heraldo (which appeared on 22 January 1900), the first daily to be published in Portuguese India.

== Bibliography ==
- O reino de Chandrapur: Uma investigação archeologica, Bastorá, Tipografia Rangel, 1896.
