= India's Magic Star =

- Genre: Reality television
- Presented by: Karishma Tanna
- Starring: Jackie Shroff; SAC Vasanth; Rajat Narsimhan
- Country of origin: India
- Original language: Hindi
- No. of seasons: 1
- No. of episodes: 31

Production
- Producer: Winay Mahajan
- Production locations: Mumbai, India
- Editor: Umashankar Mishra
- Production company: TRP: The Right Picture

Original release
- Network: STAR One
- Release: 2010

India's Magic Star is an Indian reality show that aired on STAR One. It was hosted by Karishma Tanna. Every participant performed several magic tricks in this game show.

The winner of this series was Tejas.

== Concept ==
The show aims to uncover the latent magical talent in the country, where in several magicians slug it out to win the honour of becoming India's next magic star. Along the way, the magicians would have to prove themselves adept at various forms of magic - stage magic, street magic, illusions and others. Every week you will witness increasingly difficult, daring and dazzling magic acts. The acts themselves would be a mixture of magic, glamour and entertainment.

== Judges ==
- Jackie Shroff
- SAC Vasanth
- Rajat Narsimhan
- Franz Harary
