= Home Sweet Home 2 =

- Theatrical release poster
- Directed by: Swapnil Shetkar
- Screenplay by: Swapnil Shetkar, Keith Keny
- Produced by: Swapnil Shetkar, Madhav Gad
- Cinematography: Mohit Kakodkar
- Edited by: Pradip Patil
- Music by: Rohan Naik
- Production company: Go Goa Gollywood Productions
- Release date: 25 December 2015
- Country: India
- Language: Konkani

Home Sweet Home 2 is a 2015 Indian Konkani language film written and directed by Swapnil Shetkar. It is a sequel of 2014 film Home Sweet Home. It stars John D'Silva, Rajdeep Naik and Aryan Khedekar. It is produced by Swapnil Shetkar and Madhav Gad under the banner of Go Goa Gollywood Productions. It is a mixture of political and courtroom drama. This film is inspired from real life incidents in Goan and National politics. It was released commercially all over Goa on 25 December 2015 and became an instant hit despite facing tough competition from two of the biggest Bollywood films Bajirao Mastani and Dilwale. It completed a record number of 900+ shows in first five weeks.

== Plot ==
Home sweet Home 2 takes place 3 months after the incidents of the first film. This film kick-starts with real political happening in Goa. The C.M of Goa is called at the center to be one of the Union Minister of India. As soon as the new Chief Minister is appointed, Alliance party members, led by Digambar Singbal convince some of the ruling MLA's and make then withdraw their support causing the Goa Government collapse overnight. Re-elections are declared and every political party is trying their best strategies to win the elections. Liquor parties, money for votes, promises for jobs and threats by goons; Nothing is off limits. As these event are unfolding everybody is interested in knowing whereabouts of John and Raj who once challenged the system. Some believe they were killed by the people involved in scam while some say John has accepted a huge amount of money to be silent. But nobody knows the truth for certain.

One fine day during a public meeting of Yuva Shakti Party arranged by Digambar Singbal, John and Raj make a surprise but dramatic entry and capture the public attention. It is revealed that they accepted the money offered by Digambar Singbal only with the intention to use it in their fight against corrupt system and bring justice to everyone involved in land scam.

John's case is accepted in the court of law. John is helped by a press reporter named Priya. In the process of uncovering the evidences John and Raj also expose the biggest secret behind this scam and Goan Politics, a spiritual leader who has been the King Maker of Goan politics for years.

== Production ==
Given the open ending of the first Home Sweet Home the audience had been very eager to know what happens with John & Raj. The director and producer would get bombarded with similar questions wherever they went. This was a time when The then Chief Minister of Goa, Mr Manohar Parrikar was appointed as the Defence Minister of India and Goa was witnessing political instability. Clubbing this scenario with the first film's plot Swapnil came up with basic storyline for the sequel. The sequel was readied within a year from release of the first film.

Because of the huge success of the first film, the well known businessman Ashutosh Khandekar and Charles Lobo came on board as the co-producers for the film. This film was also shot on real locations in Goa. The principal photography began on 9 October 2015 and ended on 30 October 2015.

== Release ==
The film was released commercially all over Goa on 25 December 2015 in only 4 Screens owing to presence of 2 big Bollywood films Bajirao Mastani & Dilwale. Seeing the strong audience response the multiplex owners agreed to increase the shows as well as the film was released in 8 additional screens in the second week. In order to encourage regional cinema, this film was made tax free from second week.

Due to limited numbers of screens the producers came up with an alternate way of taking the film to the audience. The film was screened in auditoriums like Ravindra Bhavan and multipurpose venues like Marqinez Palace all over Goa, Panchayat halls and church halls. Special screenings were also arranged in remote villages of Goa by renting equipments like projector, screen and 5.1 surround sound system.

Special screenings have also been arranged for audience in Gulf countries.
