= SAC Vasanth =

Indian magician, illusionist and laser show artist (born 1974)

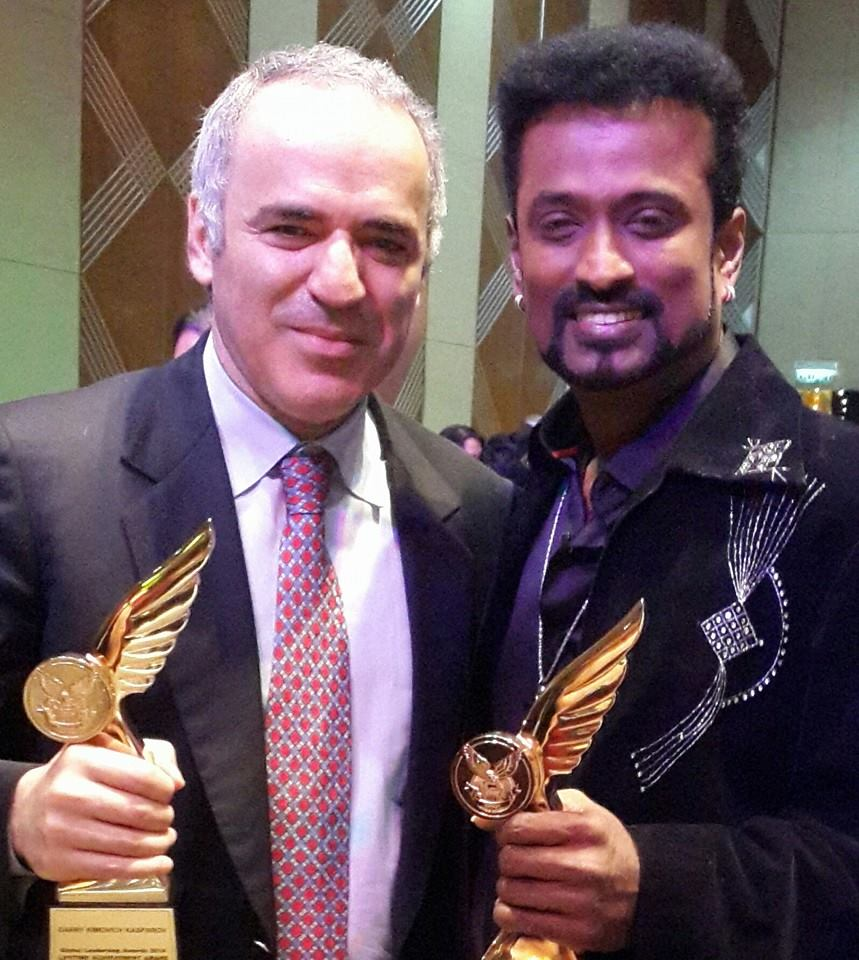
- SAC Vasanth(Right) with Garry Kasparov(Left) in 'Global Leadership Awards 2014'
- Born: Sebasti Arul Christopher Vasanth; 22 August 1974 (age 52); Coimbatore, Tamil Nadu, India.
- Other names: Master Magician, India's Magic Star
- Occupations: Magician, Illusionist, Laser Show.
- Years active: 2000–present
- Website: www.sacvasanth.com

Sebasti Arul Christopher Vasanth (SAC Vasanth) is an Indian magician, illusionist and laser show artist who performs shows in India, USA, Europe, Africa, Middle East and globally. He was titled as "Master Magician" by Star One television in 2010.

== Early life ==
Vasanth was born on 22 August 1974 in Coimbatore, Tamil Nadu, India.

== Television shows ==
- 'Maya Maya' in Doordarshan.
- 'G Boom Vikram' in Vijay TV.
- 'Fox History and Entertainment' in BBC.
- 'Logic illa Magic' in Kalaignar TV.
- 'Star One, India’s Magic Star' in STAR One.
- 'Comedy Circus ka Jadoo' in Sony Entertainment Television (India)

== Awards and honors ==
- "Best Creative Magician Award" in Hyderabad for the Year 2004
- "Best innovative Magician Award" in Howrah for the Year 2005
- "Dr. Mgr. Bharat Rathna Award" for the year 2009
- Star One television titled him as "Master Magician" in 2010
- Comedy Circus Ka Jadoo crowned him as "Prince of Indian Magic" in 2011
- Global Leadership Awards 2014 – Award for Excellence in the Art of Illusions
