= Khujli =

- Official release poster
- Directed by: Sonam Nair
- Written by: Sonam Nair
- Produced by: Chintan Ruparel; Anuj Gosalia
- Starring: Jackie Shroff; Neena Gupta
- Cinematography: Siddarth Vasani
- Edited by: Yashashwini Y. P.
- Music by: Somesh Saha
- Production companies: Terribly Tiny Talkies; The Frog Pond
- Distributed by: Terribly Tiny Talkies
- Release date: 31 March 2017 (YouTube)
- Running time: 16 minutes
- Country: India
- Language: Hindi

Khujli is a 2017 Indian short drama film written & directed by Sonam Nair, produced by Chintan Ruparel & Anuj Gosalia and starring Jackie Shroff and Neena Gupta. It was released on 31 March 2017 by Terribly Tiny Talkies to their official YouTube handle. The film marks debut of Jackie Shroff in short films.

== Plot ==
In a room, a bed is shaking rhythmically and sounds of a man moaning as it is revealed that it was due to Roopmati (Neena Gupta) is scratching Girdharilal's (Jackie Shroff) back with a churning stick to ease an itch. Their [son] knocks on the door and asks them to be quit. He further informs them that he will be out late. Girdharilal replies humorously that instead of telling so [he] could have texted them. In the kitchen, Roopmati ignites the gas stove as her aged grandmother is walking towards washroom behind her. The twist in the plot comes when Jackie finds a pair of pink handcuffs in his young son's bedroom. Scandalised and angry, he shows his find to his wife. His tirade however, is interrupted when Neena smiles slyly and tells him she knows the handcuffs are used for BDSM, because she had read Fifty Shades of Grey.

== Cast ==
- Jackie Shroff as Girdharilal
- Neena Gupta as Roopmati
- Rani Patwar as grandma
- Archak Chhabra as son of Girdharilal and Roopmati

== Soundtrack ==
The film's background score is composed by Somesh Saha and it features vocals by singer Garima Yagnik.

== Awards ==
Year	Award	Category	Nominee/Work	Result	Ref.
2018	Filmfare Short Film Awards	Best Actor (Male) in a Short FIlm	Jackie Shroff	Won	
