= Manuel de Seabra =

Portuguese writer and translator (1932–2017)

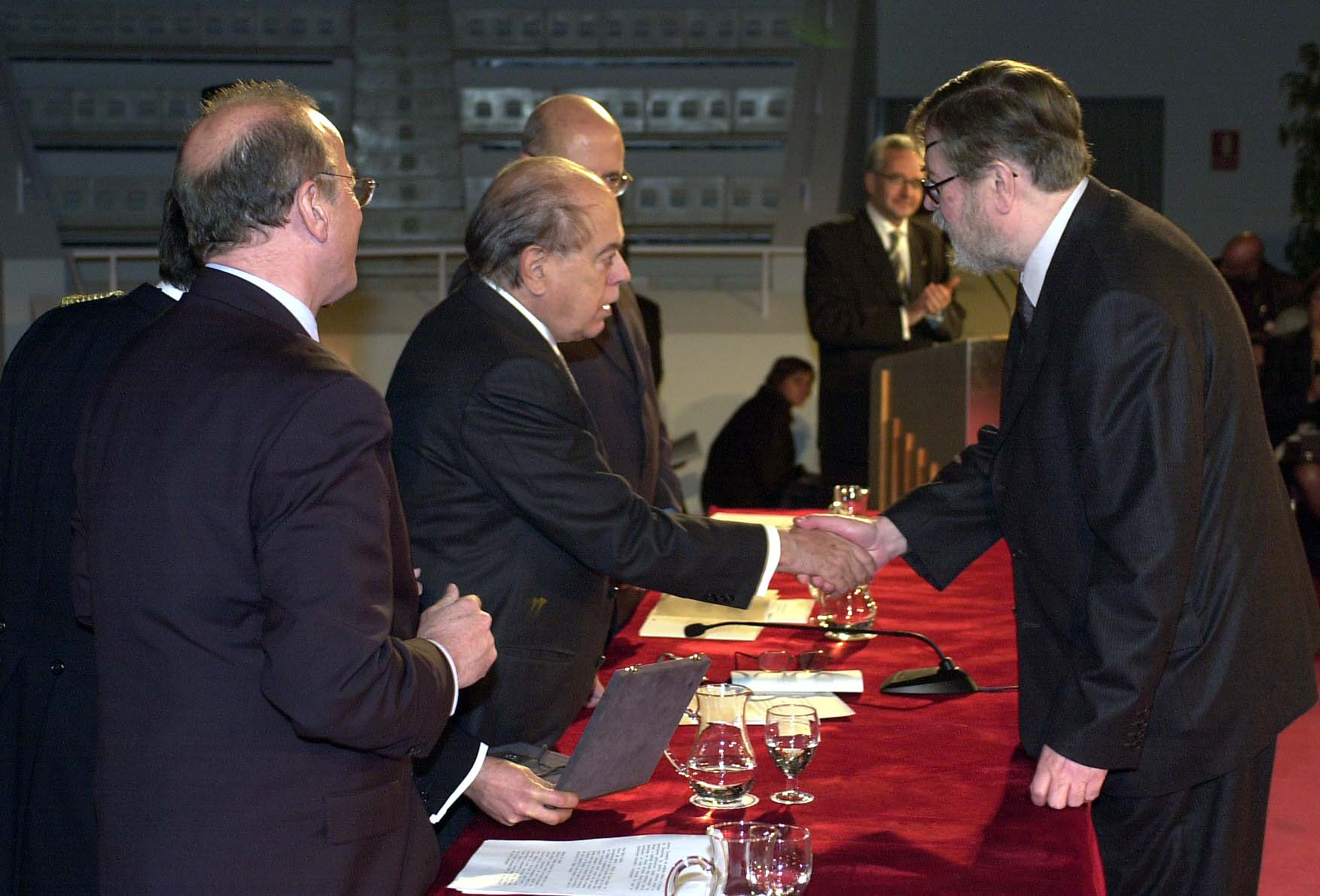
- Seabra (extreme right) in 2001
- Born: c. 1932; Lisbon, Portugal
- Died: 22 May 2017 (aged 84–85)
- Occupations: Writer; journalist; translator
- Years active: 1950–2009
- Spouse: Vimala Devi
- Awards: Creu de Sant Jordi (2001)

Manuel de Seabra (1932 – 22 May 2017) was a Portuguese writer, journalist, and translator. His translations were in Russian, Portuguese, Catalan and Esperanto. He and his wife, Vimala Devi, compiled the Portuguese-Catalan/Catalan-Portuguese Dictionary. He was awarded the Creu de Sant Jordi in 2001.

== Works ==
=== In Portuguese ===
- Eu e o diabo (1950)
- Cântico necessário (1954)
- Terra de ninguém (1959)
- O retrato esboçado (1960)
- O fogo sagrado (1961)
- Os sobreviventes (1965)
- 85 poemas realistas (1974)
- Os rios sem nome (1982)
- A literatura indo-portuguesa (1971), amb Vimala Devi
- Os exércitos de Paluzie (1982)
- Conheces Blaise Cendrars (1984)
- Promessa às escuras (1994)
- O dia em que Jesus traiu Judas (1996)
- A reforma dos cavalos (1998)
- Bar-Mitzvah (2001)
- Odiai-vos uns aos outros (2003)

=== In Catalan ===
- Els exèrcits de Paluzie (1982)
- Coneixes Blaise Cendrars? (1984)
- Paisatge amb figures (1986)
- Fer senyors a la Plaça Roja (1986)
- El dia que Jesús va trair Judes (1995)
- Odieu-vos els uns als altres (2004)
- Diccionari portuguès-català (1985), amb Vimala Devi
- Diccionari català-portuguès (1989), amb Vimala Devi

=== In Esperanto ===
- Antologio de portugalaj rakontoj (redactor) (1959)
- La armeoj de Paluzie (1996)
- Promeso en obskuro (1997)
- La tago kiam Jesuo perfidis Judason (2001)
- Ĉu vi konas Blaise Cendrars? (2007)
- Malamu vin, unu la alian (2009)
