= Home Sweet Home (2014 film) =

- Theatrical release poster
- Directed by: Swapnil Shetkar
- Screenplay by: Sai Panandikar, Swapnil Shetkar
- Story by: Swapnil Shetkar
- Produced by: Swapnil Shetkar, Madhav Gad
- Starring: John D'Silva, Rajdeep Naik, Aryan Khedekar
- Cinematography: Mohit Kakodkar
- Edited by: Pradip Patil
- Music by: Rohan Naik
- Production company: Go Goa Gollywood Productions
- Release date: 26 December 2014
- Country: India
- Language: Konkani

Home Sweet Home is a 2014 Indian Konkani language comedy film written and directed by Swapnil Shetkar and starring John D'Silva, Rajdeep Naik and Aryan Khedekar. The film is produced by Swapnil Shetkar and Madhav Gad under the banner of Go Goa Gollywood Productions. This film is inspired from real life incidents of land scam in Goa. It was released commercially all over Goa on 26 December 2014 and became an instant hit with unprecedented box office performance for a Konkani film despite being pitted against Amir khan starrer PK, one of the biggest Hindi film. It ran for 101 days in Goa during its initial release and completed a record number of 600 shows. This film has completed more than 1000 shows theatrically by December 2016, thus becoming the most successful konkani film on the box office.

== Plot ==
The film is about John D' Silva, who migrates to U.S. after the death of his parents leaving his ancestral house in Goa called "Home Sweet Home" to be looked after by his one and only friend Kaytan. When he returns to Goa after 20 years, he is shocked to see a huge residential complex standing in place of his ancestral house. Only the famous landmark, old Holy Cross outside the complex, stands there to convince the taxi driver Raj that it is the same location for certain.

Now it becomes very crucial for John to find out the mystery behind this and Kaytan is the only person who can help them solve it but soon John and Raj get one more shock when they come to know that Kaytan stays in the very same complex.

The relation between John and Raj, that of customer and driver turns into close friendship during the course of these events and they decide to fight for justice. During this tough journey John comes across various social issues, colourful characters and vast transformation in Goa that has taken place during his stay in U.S. Eventually they conclude that it is time to raise their voice to demand the justice and change the "SUSHEGAD"(laid-back) image of Goans.

As Raj & John unearth more & more evidence it becomes clear that this whole thing is part of the "biggest but most silent" land scam run by powerful and greedy builders with the help & blessings of politicians. Raj & John risk their life to expose this scam and the people involved in it.

== Production ==
This film is inspired from land scams happening in Goa. One incident in particular is in which Arjuna awardee Dr. Otilia Mascarenhas saw her ancestral property in Porvorim fraudulently 'sold' to a land shark. This was a time when Goa had hardly one or two theatrical konkani releases in a year, that too in maximum of 2 screens so the filmmakers had to produce the films by themselves as no producer was ready to fund the project. It was made on a very minimal budget. The film was shot at various real locations in Goa. Principal photography began on 18 October 2014 and went on till 3 November 2014.

== Release ==
The film was released commercially all over Goa on 26 December 2014 in 12 Screens. The premiere of the film, held at Inox Panjim was attended by then Honourable Defence Minister of India, Mr. Manohar Parrikar as the chief guest. Every show was houseful for the first week. It complete 100 houseful shows in 14 days. It ran for 84 days in 12 screens and completed 101 days in 6 screens resulting in more than 1000 shows theatrically.

Due to limited numbers of screens the producers came up with an alternate way of taking the film to the audience. The film was screened in Auditoriums like Ravindra Bhavan all over Goa, Panchayat halls and church halls. Special screenings were also arranged in remote villages of Goa by renting equipments like projector, screen and 5.1 surround sound system.

After its successful performance in India the word of mouth spread and there was a huge demand for the film from Konkani speaking community in Gulf countries. So far 7 special screenings have taken place in Dubai, Kuwait, Qatar, Bahrain, Muscat & Oman.

Home Sweet Home was also screened in IFFI 2015.

Home Sweet Home was also re-released on 15 January 2016, three weeks after the successful release of its sequel Home Sweet Home 2 - Now the game will be rough

In October 2016, the film was also made available out of India on a digital portal called goencho balcao.

== Accolades ==
The film won 6 awards in the 8th Goa State Film Awards including the award for best screenplay, best director and second best feature film.
