= Master of Performing Arts =

The Master of Performing Arts (M.P.A. or M.Perf.A.) is a graduate degree awarded in the fields of dance, drama, film and music. The degree generally requires a minimum of two years of full-time study to complete. The degree program is offered primarily in Asia, and was formerly offered in the United States of America, where it has been supplanted by the more prevalent Master of Fine Arts, Master of Music and Master of Arts in Performing Arts degrees.

== Asia ==
Institutions presently offering a Master of Performing Arts program include:

=== Bangladesh ===
- Rajshahi University

=== India ===
- Dr. Hari Singh Gour University
- Banaras Hindu University
- Bhatkhande Music Institute
- Bharathidasan University
- Indira Gandhi National Open University
- Lovely Professional University
- University of Hyderabad

=== Malaysia ===
- University of Malaya

== Europe ==
=== Italy ===
In the Italian higher education system, the various Academies of Fine Arts offer second level programs that lead to a "Diploma Accademico di Secondo Livello in Arti Visive e Discipline dello Spettacolo" which translates to "Masters in Visual and Performing Arts". The degree bears this name regardless of whether the discipline studied was in the Visual Arts or the Performing Arts. This credential is thus equivalent if the discipline studied was a Performing Arts discipline.

== United States ==
Institutions that formerly granted the Master of Performing Arts degree include:

=== California ===
- University of Southern California

=== Louisiana ===
- University of New Orleans

=== Massachusetts ===
- Emerson College

=== Oklahoma ===
- Oklahoma City University
