= Bandora, Goa =

Bandora
- Census town
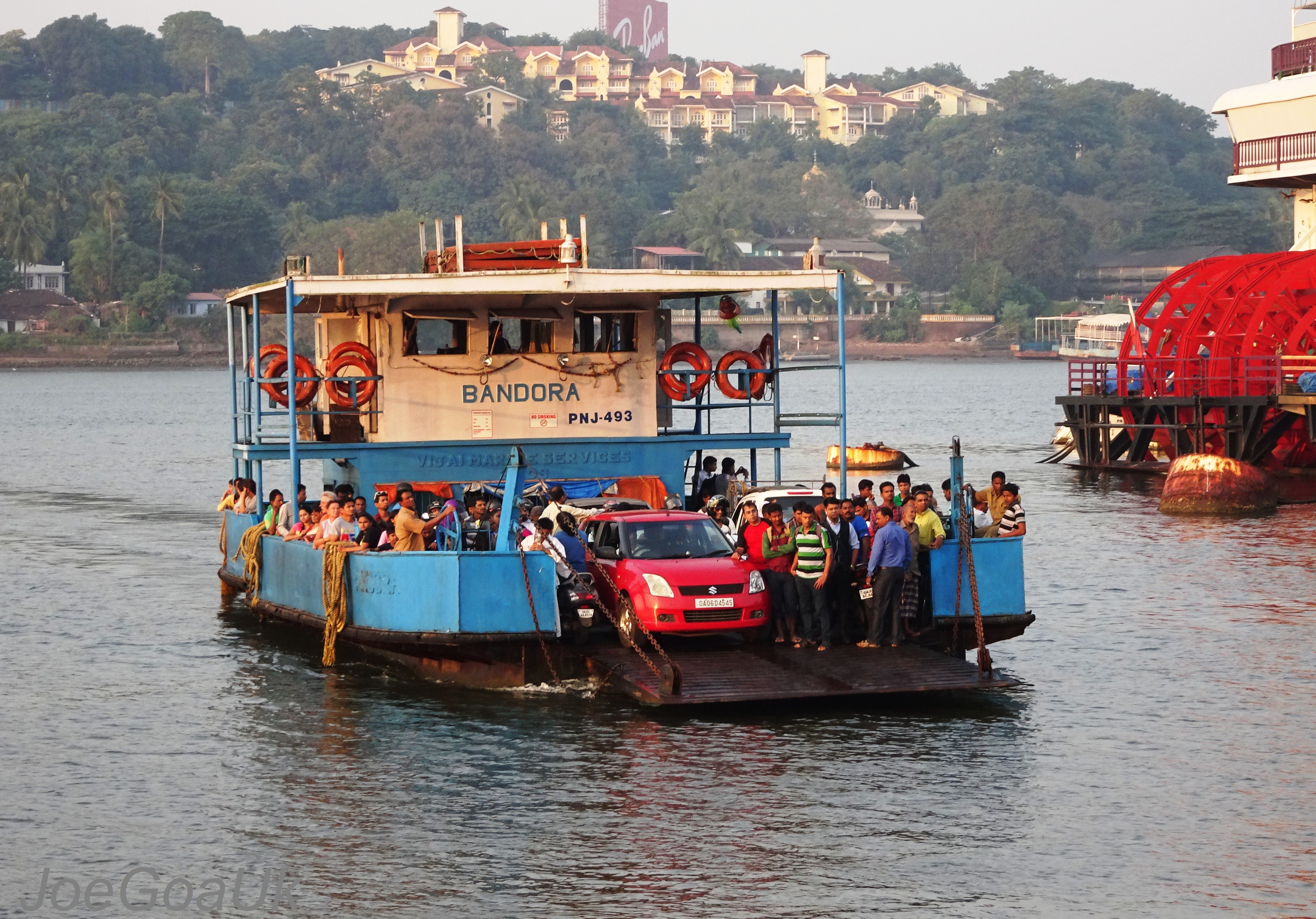
- Interactive map of Bandora
- Location in Goa, India Bandora (India)
- Coordinates: 15.40°N 73.97°E
- Country: India
- State: Goa
- District: North Goa
- Elevation: 107 m (351 ft)

Population (2001)
  - Total: 12,264

Languages
  - Official: Konkani
- Time zone: UTC+5:30 (IST)
- Vehicle registration: GA
- Website: goa.gov.in

Bandora is a census town in the Ponda Tehsil of North Goa District, in Goa State, India.

== Geography ==
Bandora is located at 15.40°N 73.97°E. It has an average elevation of 107 metres (351 feet).

== Demographics ==
As of 2001 India census, Bandora had a population of 12,264. Males constitute 54% of the population and females 46%. Bandora has an average literacy rate of 71%, higher than the national average of 59.5%; with 59% of the males and 41% of females literate. 10% of the population is under 6 years of age.

== Archaeology ==
An ancient Jain temple of Tirthankara Neminatha was found in Bandora, Goa from 1425 AD; it is now an archaeological site.
