= Soul Curry =

2017 Indian film in Konkani

- Poster of the film
- Directed by: Nieelesh Malkar
- Written by: Nieelesh Malkar
- Produced by: Michael Mascaranhas
- Starring: Jackie Shroff; Seema Biswas; Sonam Morajkar
- Cinematography: Ammarkant Dubey
- Edited by: Sanket Mavalankar
- Music by: Ramit Chabraa
- Production company: Reflection Creation
- Release date: 20 January 2017
- Country: India
- Language: Konkani

Soul Curry is a 2017 Indian film in Konkani, written and directed by Nieelesh Malkar. It features Jackie Shroff, Seema Biswas and Sonam Morajkar in the lead roles. The film won many awards in the state of Goa, and Shroff even won an award individually. It premiered in theatres on 20 January 2017.

== Plot ==
Philip (Jackie Shroff) is an arrogant saxophone player. Due to the increasing use of technology in music and his poor attitude, Philip finds it difficult to get work. Philip is married to Mary (Seema Biswas), who was also an aspiring singer but gave up her career for love. Together, they have four daughters. However, Philip is plagued by the lack of a son, and one day, kicks out his whole family.

After suffering from loneliness and losing all his work, Philip's childhood friend Michael comes to his rescue and offers him a bookkeeping job. Philip keeps Henry, an aspiring guitarist, as a paying guest at his house.

Circumstances make Philip take a girl, Angelica (Sonam Morajkar), as his paying guest. Angelica is an aspiring singer who hopes to win the title of Kingfisher Voice of Goa. Her love for music deeply troubles Philip, who never allowed Henry to play the guitar at the house.

Philip misses his family, and meets Mary, who is shown to be suffering from the last stage of cancer. She reveals that Angelica is actually his youngest daughter, and requests him to take care of her. However, Mary's subsequent death makes Philip lose his mind, and he spends the remainder of his days playing the saxophone by her grave.

== Cast ==
- Jackie Shroff as Philip
- Seema Biswas as Mary
- Sonam Morajkar as Angelica

== Awards ==
At the 9th Goa State Awards 2018, Shroff was presented with the Best Actor Award. The film also won many awards at the same event.
