= Penha de França, Goa =

Penha de França
- Town
- Location of Penha de França in Goa Penha de França (India)
- Coordinates: 15°32′02″N 73°49′27″E
- Country: India
- State: Goa
- District: North Goa
- Sub-district: Bardez

Population (2001)
  - Total: 15,375
- Time zone: UTC+5:30 (IST)
- Postcode: 403101
- Area code: 0832

Penha de França is a town in Bardez, Goa in India. It is north of the capital Panjim in North Goa. It takes its name from the patroness of its church, Nossa Senhora da Penha de França which it shares with Penha de França in Lisbon. It is the birthplace of writer Vimala Devi.

== Demographics ==
As of the 2001 India census, Penha de França had a population of 15,375. Males constitute 53% of the population and females 47%. Penha de França had an average literacy rate of 81%, higher than the national average of 59.5%: male literacy was 83%, and female literacy was 78%. In Penha de França, 10% of the population is under six years of age.

== Sports ==
Penha de França is home to Penha de França FC, that competes in GFA U-19 Football League.
