= O Heraldo =

English-language daily newspaper from Goa

- The Voice of Goa since 1900
- Type: Daily newspaper
- Format: Print, online
- Owner: Herald Publication Pvt. Ltd
- Founder: Aleixo Clemente Messias Gomes
- Publisher: Herald Publication Pvt. Ltd
- Editor-in-chief: R. F. Fernandes
- Editor: Alister Miranda
- Founded: 21 April 1900; 126 years ago
- Political alignment: Centre
- Language: Portuguese (1900–1983); English (1983–present)
- Headquarters: Panjim, Goa, India
- Circulation: 64,589
- Website: heraldgoa.in
- Free online archives: epaper.heraldgoa.in

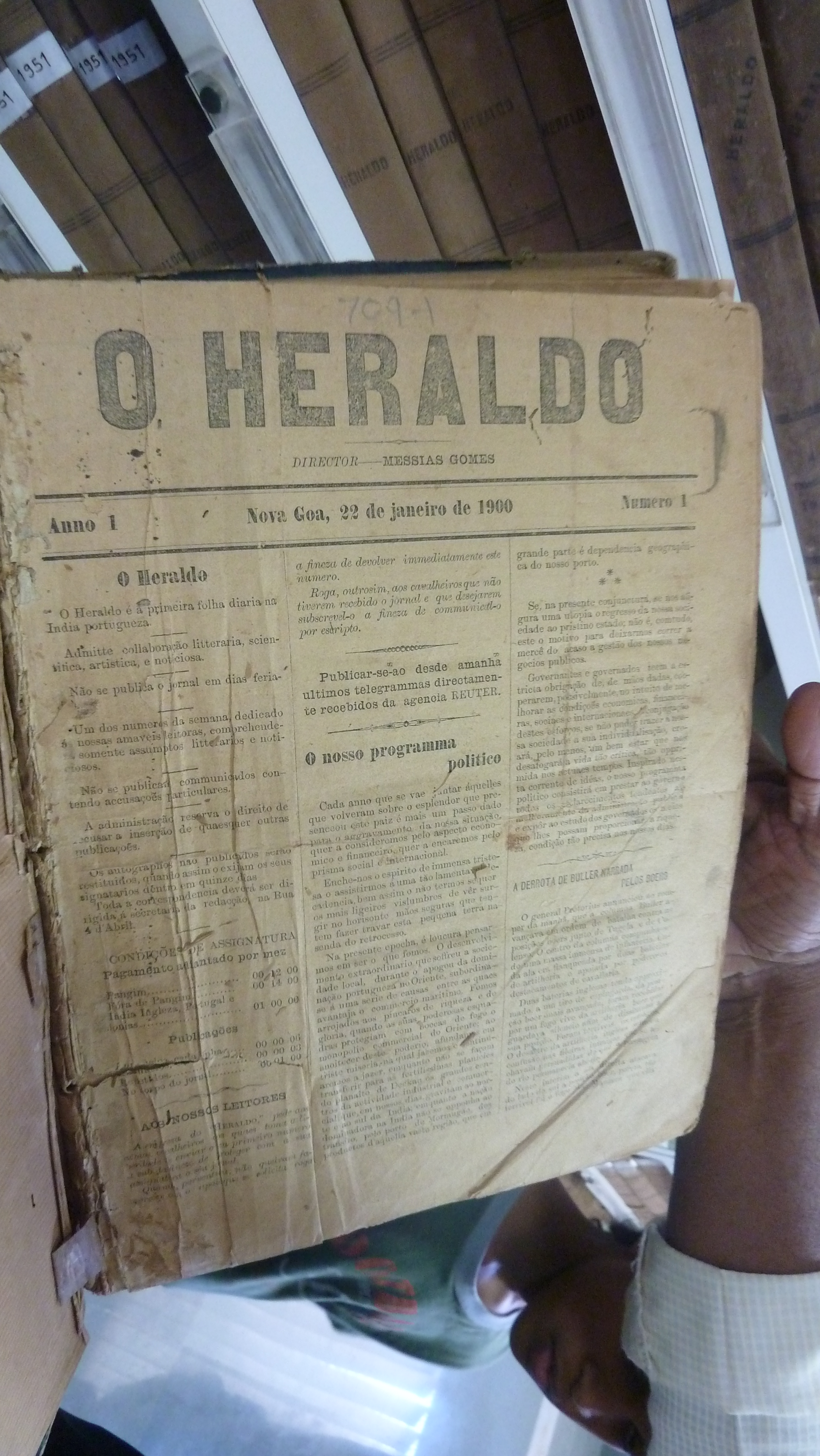
Front page of the first issue of O Heraldo

O Heraldo is a century-old English-language broadsheet daily newspaper published in Panaji, the capital of the Indian state of Goa.

== History ==
O Heraldo was established as the first daily Portuguese newspaper on 21 May 1900 by Aleixo Clemente Messias Gomes in Goa, Portuguese India. After a ten-year period in Lisbon, Portugal, Messias Gomes undertook major expansions and modernisations of the paper's operations in 1919. It was later transformed into an English daily in 1983, by which time it had become the longest-running Portuguese-language newspaper outside of Portugal and Brazil.

The newspaper currently has two supplements – the daily four-page Herald Café, which is published everyday except Monday, and the weekly four-page Herald Review, which accompanies the paper on Sunday.
