= List of Konkani-language films =

This is a list of films released by Konkani film industry.

Only theatrically released films or certified movies with public screenings are shown below. VCD/DVD movies, video films, direct to OTT films, short films, telefilms and uncertified films which were not shown in theatres are not included. Films made in other languages and dubbed into Konkani are also excluded.

Isidore Dantas has documented films released before 2015 in his book 'Konknni Cholchitram'.

Goan dialects Southern Saraswat dialect Rajapur Saraswat dialect Mangalorean Catholic dialect Karwar dialect Siddi dialect Mixed dialects

Year	Movie	Producer	Director	Notes
1950	Mogacho Anvddo	Al Jerry Braganza	Jerry Braganza	The first full-length Konkani film
1963	Amchem Noxib	Franklin Fernandes	A. Salaam	
1966	Nirmonn	Franklin Fernandes	A. Salaam	The film won two National Awards at the hands of India's then Prime Minister Indira Gandhi.
1967	Sukhachem Sopon	Jerry Braganza	Jerry Braganza	
1969	Mhoji Ghorkan'n	Shalini Mardolkar; A. Salaam	A. Salaam	
1970	Kortubancho Sounsar	Rico Rod	Rico Rod	
1972	Jivit Amchem Oxem	Muthu Krishan Das	YV Rao	First movie to be made in Karnataka. Combined artists from Mangalore and Goa.
1975	Boglantt	Muthu Krishna Das	Muthu Krishna Das	
1977	Mog Ani Maipas	Captain Mervyn Pinto	NLR Sahyadri	United Youngsters of Mangalore brought out the first colored Konkani film
1977	Bhuierantlo Munis	Tony Coutinho; Chris Perry	Shridhar Naik; S Philip	Naik died during the production
1978	Tisri Chitt	Peter Gonsalves	Peter Gonsalves	Produced in 1973
1980	Tapaswini	Hanuman Pictures	Amrit Prabhu	First film from GSB community
1981	Jana Mana	Vikas Films	Ramesh Kamath	
1982	Suzanne	Priya Productions	Ajit Sinha	Hindi-Malayalam-Konkani trilingual film
1983	Girestkai	Muthu Krishan Das	Muthu Krishan Das	
1995	Bogsanhe	Richard Castelino	Richard Castelino	It is the first film to win Karnataka State Film Award for Best Regional Film in the year 1996–97.
2000	Jeevanancho Khell	Subrahmaniam Swamy Films	A.S. Mahadevrajan	First film shot in North Canara
2004	Sood: The Revenge	Sanjeev Prabhudesai	Suresh Rivonkar	
2004	Aleesha	Rajendra Talak	Rajendra Talak	National Award for Best Feature Film in Konkani at the 52nd National Film Awards
2005	Padri	Raymond Quadros	Rajesh Fernandis	
2006	Antarnad	Rajendra Talak	Rajendra Talak	National Award for Best Feature Film in Konkani at the 57th National Film Awards
2007	Black Nhesop Atanchem Fashion	T-Bush	T-Bush	Movie made in Kuwait
2008	Rinn Tem Farikponnachem	Robashi Arts	Rohidas Shirodkar	
2008	Saavariyaa.com	Rajendra Talak	Rajendra Talak	The film is about internet marriage in Goa
2009	Mogachi Zor	B. V. Films Production Goa	Bonifacio Dias	
2009	Jagor	Damodar Naik	Sangramsingh Gaekwad	
2009	Kazaar	Frank Fernandes	Richard Castelino	The film has won Karnataka State Film Award for Best Regional Film for the year 2009–10.
2009	Paltadacho Munis	NFDC	Laxmikant Shetgaonkar	
2010	Tum Kitem Kortolo Aslo?	Sharon Mazarello	Sharon Mazarello	Screened at Addis Ababa international film festival and Marbella International Film Festival, premiered at Kuwait
2010	O Maria	M.B Creations	Rajendra Talak	The most commercially successful Konkani film
2011	Ujwadu	KJ Dhananjaya and Anuradha Padiyar	Kasargod Chinna	The film has won Karnataka State Film Award for Best Regional Film for the year 2011.
2012	Mariola	Gaurie Productions	Joe Rose	
2012	The Victim	Jerryton A. Dias	Milroy Goes	First Digital Theatrical Film
2012	Digant	Sanjay Shetye	Dnyanesh Moghe	Screened at Cannes festival, the movie is about Dhangar community of Goa.
2013	Suring	Hemant Malvankar	Swapnil Shetkar	
2013	Break Up	Joywin Fernandes Productions	Joywin Fernandes	
2013	Baga Beach	Pramod Salgaocar	Laxmikant Shetgaonkar	Screened at International Film Festival of India and won a national award.
2013	Mortoo	Atrey Sawant	Jitendra Shikerkar	
2013	Raktyug	Jayashri Motion Pictures	Sidhesh Boarkar	
2014	Gunaaji	Nilesh Nevalkar	M.S Davan Rivoncar	Based on a story by Pundalik Naik
2014	Uzvadd	Holy Spirit Films	M.S.Davan Rivoncar	
2014	Nachom-ia Kumpasar	Goa Folklore Productions	Bardroy Barretto	First Konkani Film to make it to the Oscar Shortlist. Winner of unprecedented 37 National and International Awards, most by a Konkani Film. Won 3 National Awards, 24 International Awards, and 10 State Awards. 33 Official selection at International Film Festivals. Shown in 25 countries across 6 continents.
2014	Home Sweet Home	Madhav Gad; Swapnil Shetkar	Swapnil Shetkar	
2014	In Search of Mother	Big Banner Entertainment	Ramprasad Adpaikar	
2015	MMS – a violent story of love	Joywin Fernandes Productions	Joywin Fernandes	
2015	Rose Tum	Claudio Colaco	Avinash Chari	
2015	Nirmon the Destiny	Eesha and Noah Productions	Sripad R.A.Pai	First remake Konkani film
2015	Enemy?	A.Durga Prasad	Dinesh P. Bhonsle	Won National Award for Best Konkani Film, Won Best Foreign-language feature film in International Film Maker Festival of World Cinema, Milan, Italy
2015	Hanv Tum Tum Hanv	Eddie Fernandes	Ramprasaad Adpaikar	Sci-fi based black comedy film
2015	Rakhonndar	John D'Silva	John D'Silva	
2015	Home Sweet Home 2	Madhav Gad; Swapnil Shetkar	Swapnil Shetkar	First Konkani Sequel Film
2016	Ghor Sounsar	Machi Mogi	Menino Mario Araujo	
2016	Action	John D'Silva	Christ Silva	
2016	Noshibacho Khel	Henry D'Silva Suratkal	Harry Fernandes	Released on 12 Aug 2016
2016	Ek Aslyar Ek Na	Frank Fernandes	Pradeep Paladka	Released on 2 Sep 2016 (Mangalore)
2016	Mogaan	Narendra Gaonkar	Darshan Lolienkar	
2016	Aa Vai Ja Sa	Ramesh Kamath	Ramesh Kamath	First Konkani Children's film
2016	Noshaa	Ambition Production	Edison Gomes	
2016	Big Ben	Mark de Araujo Films	Mark de Araujo	
2016	War-Onn	Haywar Productions	Mozin Travasso	
2016	K Sera Sera – Ghodpachem Ghoddtelem	Gayatri Pednekar	Rajeev Shinde	
2017	Ovisvaxi	Andrew De Souza	Alexio Fernades	
2017	Martin	A. Durga Prasad	Jitendra Shikerkar	First Konkani suspense thriller
2017	Soul Curry	Reflection Creation	Nieelesh Malkar	Starring Jackie Shroff and Seema Biswas in the main roles, it won Goa State Awards
2017	Juze	Thin Air Productions, Kepler film, Cine Sud promotions, Three River Films, Films Boutique	Miransha Naik	First Konkani film to have an India-France-Netherlands co-production born out of the NFDC Film Bazaar, It's been picked for International sales by Films Boutique. It was premiered at 41st Hong Kong international film festival and currently taking other festival rounds. First Konkani film to be reviewed by 'The Hollywood Reporter'.
2017	Ashem Zalem Kashem	Glorious Angelore Productions	Maxim Pereira	Bilingual Konkani-Tulu Movie
2017	Sophiya	Janet Noronha	Harry Fernandes	The film has won Karnataka State Film Award for Best Regional Film in the year 2017.
2017	Mogan Tujea	R Jovito Rodrigues Jayson Colaco	R Jovito Rodrigues	
2017	Anthu	Karopady Akshaya Nayak	Karopady Akshaya Nayak	
2017	Connection	Sylvester Fernandes	Christ Silva	
2017	Mahaprayan	Abhay Jog	Nilesh Karamunge	
2018	Zanvoy No 1	Sangati Creations	Harry Fernandes	Mangalorean film with Goan artistes
2018	Daiz	Anjoy Productions		
2018	O La La	AXIS VISION	Sripad R.A.Pai	Releasing on 27 May 2018
2018	7 Dayz	Joywin Fernandes Productions	Joywin Fernandes	
2018	Questao De Confusao	Chetana Productions, Go Goa Gollywood, The Neutral View	Swapnil Shetkar	Releasing on 28 September 2018
2018	Amizade (English: Friendship)	Sachin Verlekar	Aniket Naik	The film was released on 7 December 2018.
2018	Planning ... Devachem	Severino Fernandes	Rajesh Fernandes	
2018	WELCOME M1LL10NS	Manna Mohie	Milroy Goes	Released in Los Angeles, USA. Razak Khan's last film.
2019	Sasnak Mog	Aggi Rod Films	Aggi Rod	
2019	Kantaar	Janet Noronha	Nilesh Malkar	Released on 28 January 2019 (Goa) and on 9 Aug 2019 (Mangalore-Udupi)
2019	FAKE	Amod Mardolkar	Vishal Haldankar	
2019	Cynthia	Goa Global Productions	Elvis Kahn Fernandes	First Konkani horror film
2019	Miranda House	Rajendra Talak	Rajendra Talak	Marathi-Konkani bilingual film
2019	Glory - Go for the Goal	A.Durga Prasad	Jitendra Shikerkar; A. Durga Prasad; Tinky George	
2019	Bade Abbu	Astonia entertainment pvt ltd	Nitin Superkar	First Konkani Muslim Family (protagonist) oriented film. (Shot in Hindi as well, as The Steering.)
2019	Mopa Diary	V.P. Sinari and sons	Mahesh Rane	
2019	Nirmillem Nirmonem	Henry D'Silva Suratkal	Melwin Elpel	Released on 23 Aug 2019, Completed 50-day run at the theaters.
2019	Amori	Opus Gala	Dinesh P. Bhonsle	Adjudged best film at 66th National Film Awards.
2019	Padrik Nanv Na?	JP Goa Productions	Viraj Salkar; Valerian Vaz	
2019	Kaajro (English: Bitter Tree)	de Goan Studio	Nitin Bhaskar	Adjudged best film at 67th National Film Awards.
2019	Apsara Dhara	Ramesh Kamath	Ramesh Kamath	Released on 14 Nov 2019
2019	Benddkar	Harry Fernandes Films, Dolphi Rebello Production, Prince Jacob Production and Alvares Creations	Harry Fernandes	Released on 22 Nov 2019
2019	Ransaavat	Gurudas Natekar	Jayandranath Haldankar	Released on 24 Nov 2019
2020	Pedru Poder	Big Banner Entertainment	Jojo D'souza	
2020	Ironheart	Spring Pictures	Gautam Parwar	Theatrical release on 14 February 2020 at Inox Goa Multiplex
2021	DCosta House	Sharvani Productions	Jitendra Shikerkar	
2021	Amche Samsar	Amche Creations	Sandeep Kamath	First movie from RSB community
2022	Gang	Infant Jesus Production	Elnish Rodrigues	
2022	Fotting No. 1	Joywin Fernandes Productions	Joywin Fernandes	
2022	Allshi Redde	Sparkle Production	Godwin Sparkle & Hera Pinto	Released on 9 September 2022 Title Song Released on 13 August 2022
2022	Baayo	Nagendra Kamath	Ramananda Nayak	
2023	Tem...battle of egos	Shrugal Entertainment	Vinay Vishnu Gawas	
2023	Aiz Maka Falea Tuka	Akshay Singh; Sreejith Karanavar	Sreejith Karanavar	Released on 27 January 2023
2023	Vodthanthlem Ful	Sunil Baretto	Melwin Elpel	Released on 14 April 2023
2023	Lucky Draw 777	Rayan Magneto	Rayan Magneto	A Indie Konkani Comedy film released on 02 Sept 2023(Mangalore), 28 Jan 2024(Canada)
2023	Osmitay	Louis J Pinto and Mandd Sobhann Productions	Vilas Ratnakar Kshatriya	Mixed dialect Konkani film about the origin of Konkani people released on 15 September 2023
2023	Tarpana	Om Productions and Malshi Pictures	Devdas Nayak	Released on 17 November 2023 in Naperville, IL.
2023	Crazy Mogi	Prasad Creations	Christ Silva	
2023	#Mog	Big Banner Entertainment	Nilesh Malkar	
2024	Nimnni Chitt	Nazario Fernandes	Elnish Rodrigues	
2024	Payann: A timeless legacy	Sangeeth Ghar Productions	Joel Pereira	Premiered on September 15, 2024, and released on September 20, 2024
2024	Tu Maje	I Production Films	Prathamesh Mangaonkar	
2024	The Candle Still Burns	Manfil Productions	Agnelo Fernandes	
2024	Dolle	Rajesh Kudaikar	Rajesh Kudaikar	
2024	Anthyarambha	Kiranmayi Kamath	Ramesh Kamath	
2024	Rhythm of Dammam	Inner Silence Films	Jayan Cherian	Konkani-Kannada bilingual film on Siddi community
2025	Mog Asum	Flowing Mandovi Films	Agnelo Angelo Braganza	
2025	Mogacho Korar	Nerissa Fernandes	Silverio Cardozo	
2025	Fondacho Misther	Rayan Magneto Films	Rayan Magneto	Released across Coastal Karnataka on 25 April 2025, Highest footfalls record of over 40K
2025	Jevann	Sri Mahammayi Cine Creation	Karopady Akshay Nayak	
2025	Claudia	Rajendra Talak Creations	Rajendra Talak	
2025	My Dear Father	Comedy Company Creations	Nellu Permannur	
2025	Bapache Putache Navim	Daijiworld Films	Stany Bela	
2025	Vaimanik	Nitish Pires	Nitish Pires	
2025	Nagna Sathya	Kiranmayi Kamath	Ramesh Kamath	
2025	Aai Saiba	Hanif Shaikh	Stanley D'Costa	
2026	Just Married.com	Joywin Fernandes Productions	Joywin Fernandes	
2026	Umesh	Gurunath Patade	Vardhan Vijaykumar Kamat	
2026	Vaganso Khel	Praveen Fernandes	Arvin Lobo	
2026	Toxench Zanv	Rayan Magneto Films	Rayan Magneto	Released across Coastal Karnataka on 15 May 2026

== Bibliography ==
- Konknni Cholchitram, Isidore Dantas, 2010
- 50 Years of Konkani Cinema, Andrew Greno Viegas, 2000
