= Comedian Nato =

Indian comedian and actor (born 1972)

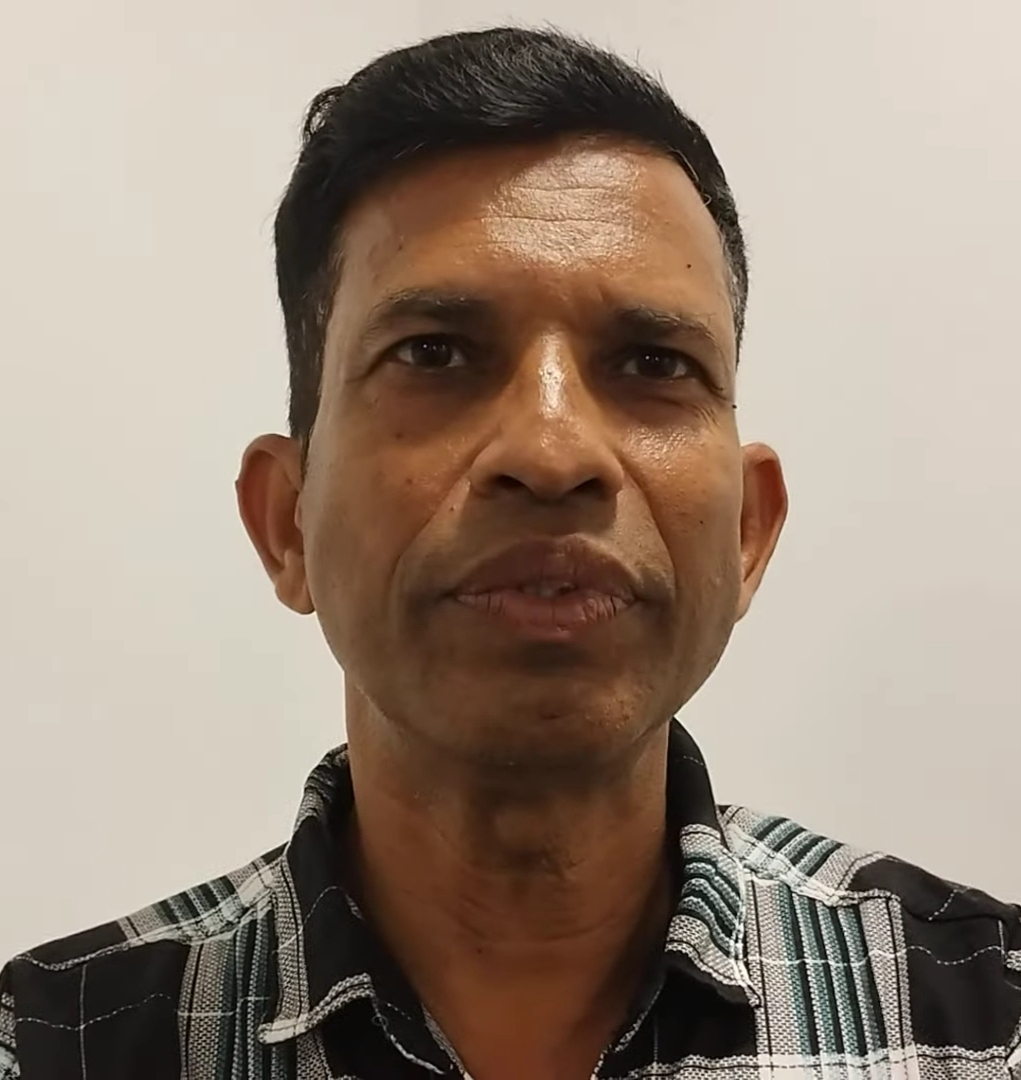
- Vales in 2024
- Born: Natolino Lourenco Vales; 28 December 1972 (age 53); Curchorem, Goa, India
- Occupations: Comedian; actor; singer
- Years active: 2000s–present
- Notable work: Nachom-ia Kumpasar
- Spouse: Bernadina Rodrigues (m. 2003)
- Children: 2
- Relatives: Hortencio Pereira (uncle)

Natolino Lourenco Vales (born 28 December 1972), known professionally as Comedian Nato, is an Indian comedian, actor, and singer known for his work in Konkani films and tiatr productions. Under the mentorship of his uncle Hortencio Pereira, Vales made his debut as a child actor at the age of 7. In a career spanning more than two decades, he has collaborated with several notable playwrights such as John D' Silva, Wilmix-Sharon, Anil Kumar, William de Curtorim, among others.

== Early life ==
Natolino Lourenco Vales was born on 28 December 1972 in the Kakoda neighborhood of Curchorem, Goa, India. During his formative years, Vales navigated through a series of obstacles. His mother's decision to pursue work opportunities abroad in order to sustain their family played a pivotal role in contributing to Vales' holistic personal growth. He has articulated a sense of appreciation for the constructive guidance provided by his maternal uncle, Hortencio Pereira, emphasizing that he has embraced significant values through their relationship.

Vales's early interest and involvement in the Goan theatrical form of tiatr was facilitated by his uncle, Hortencio. During his childhood, Hortencio initiated Vales into the world of tiatr performances at the age of seven. In addition to his attendance at tiatr performances, Vales immersed himself in the traditional street plays known as Zomnivoile khell in his local village, further deepening his engagement with the cultural arts community during his youth. His active engagement in theatrical endeavors during his formative years contributed to his eventual career as a professional tiatr artist. In an era when transportation was more limited, Vales and his uncle undertook significant journeys from Sanvordem to Margao, a popular tiatr center, in order to witness performances.

== Career ==
Vales is known particularly his comedic roles. He commenced his career with minor roles, but a crucial opportunity arose when his two uncles, Agnelo and Hortencio, who were established comedic actors, invited Vales to replace Agnelo in one of his comedic roles. Vales' performance in this substituted role was so well-received that it marked a significant turning point, leading him to focus more on comedy going forward. Following this breakthrough, he began regularly working with various Goan theater directors, including Tony Park, with whom he made his professional debut in tiatrs (a traditional Goan theater form). He subsequently collaborated on comedic productions with a number of other directors, such as Betty Alvares, Seby de Sarzona, William de Curtorim, Pascoal Rodrigues, Maxy Periera, Milagres de Chandor, Fr Planton Faria, Wilmix-Sharon, Christina Vaz, John D' Silva, Anil Kumar, Domnic Carvalho, among others.

Vales has appeared in several Konkani VCD (Video Compact Disc) productions, including the films Vizmit directed by Arnold D'Costa, Stop it, Dog Chedde Dogui Redde, Vadoll etc. In addition to his film roles, he has also acted in tiatrs, a form of Konkani theater. One such tiatr production showcased the story of the humanitarian, Mother Teresa, highlighting her life and contributions. In this theatrical work, Vales was required to portray multiple characters, a common practice in tiatr performances. In a specific segment of the performance, he took on the role of a goonda, commonly known as a gangster, who crosses paths with Mother Teresa as she journeys to the convent with a young child. As part of this role, Vales' character was meant to threaten Mother Teresa using a prop pistol. However, in a crucial moment of the play, as he aimed the prop gun at the actress depicting Mother Teresa, the fake revolver's muzzle fractured. As a consequence, the spring mechanism of the prop gun became dislodged and was left hanging in his grasp. This technical malfunction reportedly elicited laughter not only from the audience but also from the actress portraying Mother Teresa herself.

Vales expressed aspirations to direct tiatrs (theatrical productions) in the future. As of October 2011, he stated that he intended to pursue this goal, but only after undergoing instruction and guidance from Konkani directors like Mario Menezes, John D' Silva, and Roseferns. Vales possesses the ability to perform both comedic roles and sing. He views this versatility as a significant advantage, as this enables him to explore a wider range of professional opportunities overseas and showcase his talents through live shows in tiatrs. These types of skills are often sought after in the Konkani entertainment industry. In December 2011, Vales was cast in a comedic role in the Konkani VCD action comedy film Bhognnar, which was directed by John D' Silva.

Vales participated in several theatrical productions in the mid-2010s. In March 2015, he was cast in the comedy film Paying Guest, directed by Comedian Agostinho in collaboration with Manfa Music. Vales portrayed the lead role of the paying guest, with Comedienne Janet in a co-starring role. Later that same year, in December 2015, Vales was selected to appear in the tiatr (a form of Goan theater) titled Tuzo-l Dis Yetolo (Your Day Will Come), written by playwright Roseferns. Vales undertook a comic role in the production, acting alongside fellow performers Comedian Richard, Dorothy, and Reggie. Additionally, he and Richard performed a political satire duet song as part of the tiatr. The following year, in May 2016, Vales was again cast in a tiatr production by Roseferns, this time titled All The Best. Once more, he was given a comic supporting part in the play, co-starring with Richard, Dorothy, and Reggie.

== Personal life ==
Vales married Bernadina "Berna" Rodrigues, a fellow Konkani actress and musician who made her debut in khell tiatrs. She is a choir leader at Guardian Angel Church in Curchorem and also runs a music school. Together, the couple had two sons, Roneber, a fellow child actor active on the Konkani stage, and Reyhan.

As of 2012, Vales resided in the neighborhood of Morailem in Curchorem, Goa. Vales and his family are practicing Roman Catholics. As of 2024, he resides with his family in Sanvordem, Goa.
