= Pascoal de Chicalim =

Indian playwright and director (born 1970)

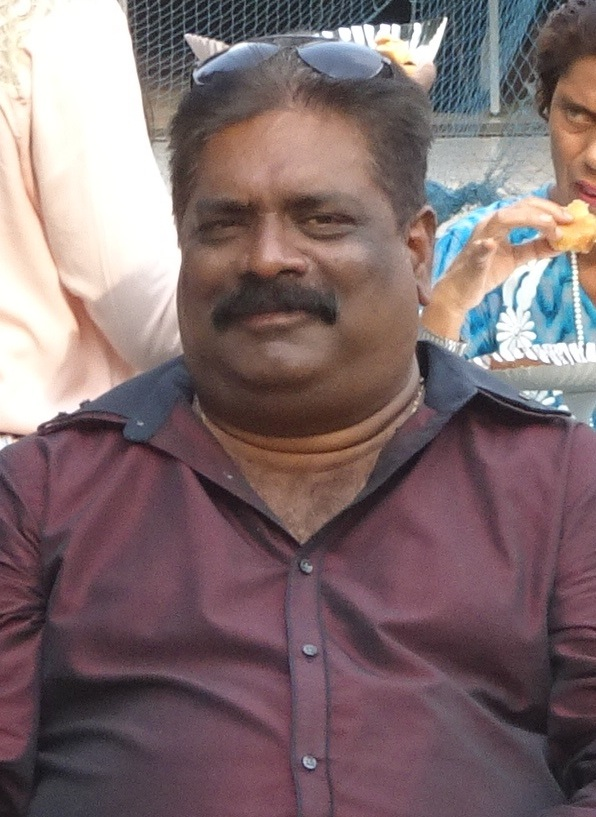
- Fernandes at the Kala Academy, 2018
- Born: Pascoal Tony Fernandes; 15 March 1970 (age 55); Mapusa, Goa, India
- Other names: Pascu
- Occupations: Playwright; theatre director; producer; actor; singer
- Years active: c. 1983–present
- Employer: Mormugao Port Trust
- Notable work: Do Pal (1991); Connection (2017)
- Spouse: Sharon Fernandes (m. 1996)
- Children: 2
- Website: facebook.com/pascoalf3

Pascoal Tony Fernandes (born 15 March 1970), known professionally as Pascoal de Chicalim, is an Indian playwright, theatre director, theatrical producer, actor, and singer known for his work in Hindi, Konkani films, Marathi nataks, and tiatr productions.

== Early life ==
Fernandes grew up with his sisters, including Sera, Felicia, Sabrina, and Dolsey. From a young age, he demonstrated an interest and talent in the performing arts. During his early adolescence, at 13 years old, he authored his inaugural tiatr performance titled Sogllim Ami Ektaim (All of Us Together), which debuted in his village as part of the annual festivities commemorating Mother Mary. Over the following years, Fernandes continued his literary journey by crafting tiatrs such as Bunead (Foundation) and Kupam (Clouds) specifically tailored for village feasts and communal celebrations. In his early career as a playwright, he crafted tiatrs for the parish church in Colvale, collaborating with amateur actors to present these theatrical works. Fernandes began his artistic career by predominantly presenting performances in rural villages and local environments.

Fernandes hailed from the town of Colvale, but later he made a transition to Vasco da Gama, Goa due to professional motivations and has chosen to maintain his place of residence there. There have been instances of confusion where individuals have incorrectly attributed Fernandes to the nearby region of Chicalim in Vasco da Gama, possibly owing to the similarity in names between the two locations. Fernandes's upbringing was shaped by his mother Maria's insistence that the family master the use of a traditional grinding tool known as a Rogddo. She was strict in ensuring her children, including Fernandes, learned to grind food items properly using this device, and would even resort to physical discipline if they did not cooperate. This resulted in Fernandes facing mockery from neighbors until his father Camilo acquired a mixer, which made the grinding stone obsolete.

== Career ==
Fernandes' 1990 production titled Tuzo Rag Mhozo Bodlo (Your Anger, My Revenge) was a milestone, elevating him to widespread acknowledgment. Around the same time, he was given the stage name "Pascoal de Chicalim" by Fr. Savio Gama, a priest known for his healing abilities originating from Verna in the region of Goa, and connected to the Colvale church at the time. In addition to his own dramatic works, Fernandes also contributed to tiatrs (Konkani-language theatrical productions) created by other popular Goan artists. He collaborated with the Mapusa-based playwright Joe Boy, providing input for the tiatrs Soiro (Relative) and To Melo (He Died). These productions featured a cast that included Wilmix/Sharon, William de Curtorim, H. Britton, and Young Chico. Furthermore, Fernandes had acting roles in the tiatr Chitrakar ("Painter") by Bonaventure D'Pietro, as well as in a theatrical production overseen by Fermeena Khaunte.

Fernandes was actively involved in various aspects of tiatr production, including scriptwriting, performing, and singing. He exhibited a fervor for vocal performance, actively engaging in village theatrical performances called tiatrs, where he formed collaborations with the comedian Leslie. This demonstrated his versatility as a performer, able to transition between various roles within the tiatr medium. Beyond his work as a performer, Fernandes also contributed to the tiatr canon as a playwright. The theatrical production Gulfache Udok (Water of Gulf) was written by him specifically for the producer Seby de St. Jose de Areal, assembling a cast of seasoned tiatr artists for this production. The play was staged 11 times, showcasing the talents of the performers under his direction. Fernandes also leveraged opportunities to showcase his talents on a larger stage. In 2010, he participated in the annual tiatr competition organized by the Kala Academy, presenting his work Pojisanv (Position), which secured the fourth place. This recognition encouraged Fernandes to expand his reach, and in 2012, he transitioned to the commercial tiatr circuit, continuing to present his artistic endeavors to a wider audience.

Since the early 2010s, Fernandes has written and directed Konkani plays that have achieved commercial success and were characterized by an element of suspense in their storytelling, including Doria (2013), Viva Sao Joao (2014), Devchar (2015), Anj Boddvo (2016), Sopon (2017), Kolakaram (2018), Rochnna (2019), and Hanv Goemcho Saiba (2022). In addition to his playwriting and directorial work, Fernandes has experience as a stage manager. He collaborated with the Goan theatrical figure Irineu Gonsalves in the creation of the tiatr performance Goy Goykaranchem, (Goa Belongs to Goans), which was Gonsalves' first such production. Fernandes' adeptness in regional languages, particularly Marathi, has facilitated his diversification into theatrical endeavors beyond Konkani productions. He has performed in four Marathi village nattaks (dramas), with two productions emphasizing social themes, while two others centering on historical subjects. Fernandes' creative contributions extend beyond the theater. He played a role in the 2017 Konkani movie Connection produced by Silvester Fernandes and also appeared in the 1991 Hindi film Do Pal alongside veteran actors Paresh Rawal and Akshay Anand.

While Fernandes's primary creative outlet is acting, he has scripted tiatrs, particularly in crafting suspenseful narratives. As an actor, he is particularly known for his abilities in character acting on the tiatr stage. This sometimes overshadows his skills as a singer. He prefers embodying complex character roles, often of a suspenseful or dramatic nature. Fernandes' output as a tiatr practitioner is constrained by his professional responsibilities at the Mormugao Port Trust (MPT). In contrast to certain peers who often stage several tiatr shows each season, he dedicates his attention to creating a single significant production annually. However, he dedicates significant time and attention to refining this singular annual tiatr, with the aim of delivering a performance that thoroughly captivates the tiatr-going audience.

== Personal life ==
Fernandes moved to Vasco da Gama, Goa, to work near the Mormugao Port Trust, where he is currently employed.
