= Hortencio Pereira =

Indian actor and playwright

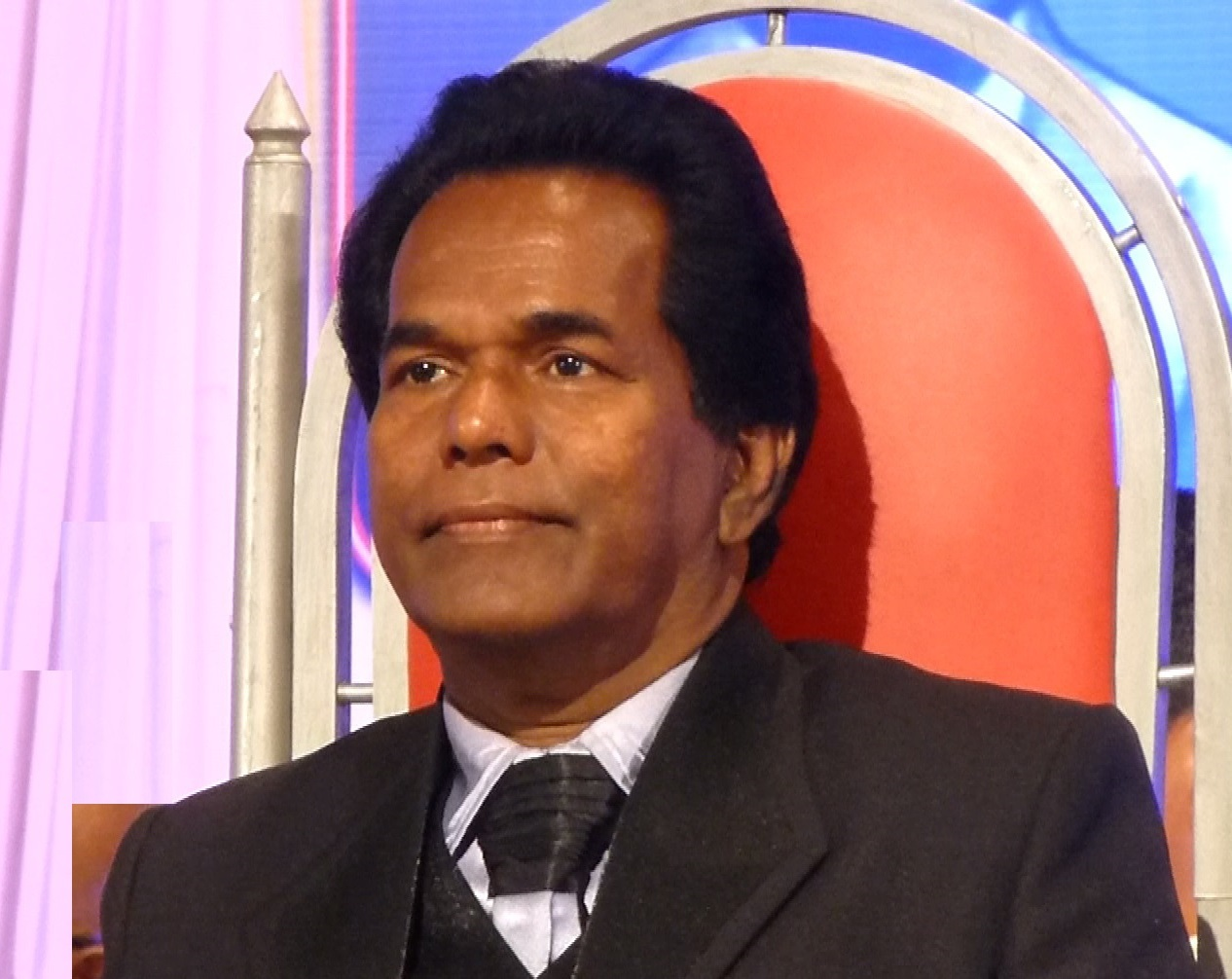
- Pereira in 2016
- Born: Hortencio Saluzinho Eduardo Vaz e Pereira; 11 January 1953 (age 73); Curchorem, Goa, Portuguese India
- Education: The Parvatibai Chowgule College
- Occupations: Actor; singer; playwright; comedian; director; composer
- Years active: 1965–present
- Relatives: Comedian Nato (nephew)

Hortencio Saluzinho Eduardo Vaz e Pereira (born 11 January 1953) is an Indian actor, lyricist, playwright, comedian, and singer who primarily works on the Konkani stage (Tiatr). Over a career spanning more than five decades, he has performed with several prominent directors and is noted for his contributions to Goan musical and dramatic arts.

== Early life and education ==
Pereira was born in Curchorem, Goa, to Custodio Jose Pereira and Conceicao Vaz. He attended Guardian Angel High School and completed his S.S.C. in 1971. He later graduated with a Bachelor of Arts in Psychology from Parvatibai Chowgule College, Margao, in 1975. While his family was not professionally involved in theater, he was influenced by his elder brother, Chrispino Pereira, who performed in local village productions.

== Career (1965–present) ==
=== Acting ===
Pereira made his stage debut at age 12 in the tiatr Sukh ani Dukh (1965). His first commercial appearance followed in 1968 in Jess Fernandes's Noxibantlim Khoddpam. Throughout his career, he has performed as a lead actor and comedian for renowned tiatrists including M. Boyer, C. Alvares, Alfred Rose, and Prem Kumar.

He is known for his versatility in dialects, comfortably performing in both the Bardez and Salcette accents of Konkani. He has also performed in Mangalorean Konkani musical shows and Hindi orchestras.

=== Writing and directing ===
Pereira began scripting plays as a teenager, winning "Best Writer," "Best Director," and "Best Actor" awards at inter-village competitions between 1970 and 1972. Notable early works include Doulot (1969) and Bhas (1980).

In 1985, a professional production of Bhas faced significant financial losses after a lead performer failed to appear, leading Pereira to focus primarily on acting and songwriting for several years. He later returned to writing, serving as a ghostwriter for William de Curtorim and staging the production Hanv Vetam in 2016 at the Kala Academy tiatr competition.

=== Singing and song-writing ===
As a lyricist and composer, Pereira has produced over 500 songs. He has released 10 audio albums, including Avoicho Mog and Bapaiche Tyag. He is credited with writing the lyrics for several prominent artists, including a collaboration with the musician Chris Perry.

== Personal life ==
Pereira was an English and Geography teacher at Don Bosco School, Rivona, from 1982 to 1986. He has also worked as an insurance agent and operates a toiletries business with his wife, Matilda. A sports enthusiast, he played competitive football into his sixties and represented his school and college teams.

== Awards and recognition ==
In 2023, Pereira was honored with the Goa State Cultural Award for his significant contributions to the field of Tiatr and Konkani music.

== Stage credits ==
Year	Title	Credited As
1965	Sukh Ani Dukh	Actor
1966	Nimnno Ekuch Pelo	Actor
1968	Noxibantlim Khoddpam	Actor
Unknown	Khotto Poiso	Actor
Unknown	Tuje Dolle	Actor (Played two separate roles)
1969	Doulot	Writer, director, Actor & Singer
1970	Odruxtt	Writer, director, Actor & Singer
1972	Tyag	Writer, director, Actor & Singer
1974	Onath	Writer, director, Actor & Singer
1980	Bhas	Writer, director, Actor & Singer
	Purtugez Kolvont	Actor
	Atacho Temph	Actor
	Divya Pondha	Actor/Comedy Script Writer
	Daiz	Actor/Comedy Script Writer
	Sorg Tujea Dolleani	Actor/Comedy Script Writer
	Tu Londonkar Vo Goykar	Actor/Comedy Script Writer
	Tu Londonkar Vo Goykar 2	Actor/Comedy Script Writer
2016	Hanv Vetam	Writer, director, Actor & Singer
2018	Tukai Tench Aasa	Actor
2019	DySp Tony Tavares	Writer, director, Actor & Singer

== Albums ==
Year	Title	Credited As	Noted Singers
1982	Avoicho Mog	Writer, Singer & Producer	Alfred Rose, Young Chico, Anthony San, Aniceto, Socorro De Santa Cruz, Menino Mario, Domnick Vaz, William De Curtorim, Lorna, Emeliano De Borda, Agnelo Pereira, Antonete Mendes, Rita Rose, Betty Nazareth, Querobina Carvalho, Chitra, Bushan, Angela Moraes.
1986	Sovostkaiechim Lharam	Writer, Singer & Producer	Alfred Rose, Young Chico, Anthony San, Aniceto, Socorro De Santa Cruz, Menino Mario, Domnick Vaz, William De Curtorim, Lorna, Emeliano De Borda, Agnelo Pereira, Antonete Mendes, Rita Rose, Betty Nazareth, Querobina Carvalho, Chitra, Bushan, Angela Moraes.
1988	Rochnar	Writer, Singer & Producer	Alfred Rose, Young Chico, Anthony San, Aniceto, Socorro De Santa Cruz, Menino Mario, Domnick Vaz, William De Curtorim, Lorna, Emeliano De Borda, Agnelo Pereira, Antonete Mendes, Rita Rose, Betty Nazareth, Querobina Carvalho, Chitra, Bushan, Angela Moraes.
1990	Khobrank Lagon	Writer, Singer & Producer	Alfred Rose, Young Chico, Anthony San, Aniceto, Socorro De Santa Cruz, Menino Mario, Domnick Vaz, William De Curtorim, Lorna, Emeliano De Borda, Agnelo Pereira, Antonete Mendes, Rita Rose, Betty Nazareth, Querobina Carvalho, Chitra, Bushan, Angela Moraes.
1992	Bapaiche Tyag	Writer, Singer & Producer	Alfred Rose, Young Chico, Anthony San, Aniceto, Socorro De Santa Cruz, Menino Mario, Domnick Vaz, William De Curtorim, Lorna, Emeliano De Borda, Agnelo Pereira, Antonete Mendes, Rita Rose, Betty Nazareth, Querobina Carvalho, Chitra, Bushan, Angela Moraes.
1996	Mondir	Writer, Singer & Producer	Alfred Rose, Young Chico, Anthony San, Aniceto, Socorro De Santa Cruz, Menino Mario, Domnick Vaz, William De Curtorim, Lorna, Emeliano De Borda, Agnelo Pereira, Antonete Mendes, Rita Rose, Betty Nazareth, Querobina Carvalho, Chitra, Bushan, Angela Moraes.
1999	Kantteancho Mukutt	Writer, Singer & Producer	Alfred Rose, Young Chico, Anthony San, Aniceto, Socorro De Santa Cruz, Menino Mario, Domnick Vaz, William De Curtorim, Lorna, Emeliano De Borda, Agnelo Pereira, Antonete Mendes, Rita Rose, Betty Nazareth, Querobina Carvalho, Chitra, Bushan, Angela Moraes.
2004	Alvito D'Cunha	Writer, Singer & Producer	Alfred Rose, Young Chico, Anthony San, Aniceto, Socorro De Santa Cruz, Menino Mario, Domnick Vaz, William De Curtorim, Lorna, Emeliano De Borda, Agnelo Pereira, Antonete Mendes, Rita Rose, Betty Nazareth, Querobina Carvalho, Chitra, Bushan, Angela Moraes.
2008	Kumaricho King	Writer, Singer & Producer	Alfred Rose, Young Chico, Anthony San, Aniceto, Socorro De Santa Cruz, Menino Mario, Domnick Vaz, William De Curtorim, Lorna, Emeliano De Borda, Agnelo Pereira, Antonete Mendes, Rita Rose, Betty Nazareth, Querobina Carvalho, Chitra, Bushan, Angela Moraes.
2012	Avoicho Mog (Re-Release)	Writer, Singer & Producer	Alfred Rose, Young Chico, Anthony San, Aniceto, Socorro De Santa Cruz, Menino Mario, Domnick Vaz, William De Curtorim, Lorna, Emeliano De Borda, Agnelo Pereira, Antonete Mendes, Rita Rose, Betty Nazareth, Querobina Carvalho, Chitra, Bushan, Angela Moraes.
2019	Sonvsaracho Xevott	Writer, Singer & Producer	

== Awards ==
Year	Organisation	Category
2002	Kala Academy	Best Lyrics
2010	Kala Academy	Ut'tom Comedian
2011	Kala Academy	Ut'tom Kovonn
2014	Kala Academy	Ut'tom Comedian
2014	Voice of Curchorem	Lifetime Achievement Award
2014	Sankalp Theatre	Felicitation
2014	Kala Academy	October Trophy (Meet the Artist)
2016	Kala Academy	Life Time Achievement Award
2015	All Goa Laughter Competition	Award Winner
2016	JCI Salcet Coastal	Salute The Silent Worker
2016	Tiatr Academy Goa	Life Time Contribution Award
2023	Goa Government	Goa State Cultural Awards
