= Eddison Fernandes =

Indian comedian and actor (1983–2009)

- Fernandes in the late-2000s
- Born: Eddison Rosario Fernandes; 14 June 1983; Fatorda, Goa, India
- Died: 17 October 2009 (aged 26); Goa Medical College, Bambolim, Goa, India
- Burial place: St. Michael’s Church cemetery, Orlim, Goa
- Other names: Edison Rosario Fernandes
- Occupations: Comedian; actor; singer; composer; keyboardist
- Years active: 2003–2009
- Notable work: Tum Kitem Kortolo Aslo? (2010)
- Spouse: Anisha Fernandes
- Awards: KA's "Best Supporting Actor Award" (2003)

Eddisson Rosario Fernandes (born Eddison Rosario Fernandes; 14 June 1983 – 17 October 2009), also known mononymously as Edison, was an Indian comedian, actor, singer, composer, writer, businessman, and former keyboardist known for his work in Konkani films and tiatr productions. He made his debut in Sharon Mazarello's tiatr Puro Korat (2003). He was best known for his comic role in the Konkani film Tum Kitem Kortolo Aslo? (2010).

== Early life ==
Fernandes was born as Eddison Rosario Fernandes on 14 June 1983, at Dr. A. V. Da Costa Memorial Clinic in the suburb of Fatorda, located in the state of Goa, India. His parents were Martin and Josefa Mariquinha Alberta Fernandes. Upon the conclusion of his academic pursuits, Fernandes initiated the establishment of a service entity named Master Engineering in the census town of Varca. The company offered a variety of services including air-conditioning supply and maintenance, electrical services, and technical assistance. They catered to a diverse clientele, serving both the public and high-end hotels in the area. In addition to his business endeavors, Fernandes undertook a theater program at the T.A.C.T Institute located in Margao. It was through his acting abilities showcased on the Konkani stage that Fernandes gained significant recognition.

== Career ==
Fernandes emerged as a multifaceted contributor to the world of tiatrs, a unique form of Goan musical theater, showcasing his talents as a musician, writer, composer, singer, and actor. Initially establishing himself as a keyboardist, he embarked on his tiatr journey. In 2003, Fernandes made his first appearance in Puro Korat (Enough of That), a tiatr written by Konkani playwright Sharon Mazarello. The production not only participated in the Kala Academy's competition but also earned Fernandes the Best Supporting Actor Award for his performance. A breakthrough opportunity presented itself when Fernandes became involved in the non-stop show Tumi Tumche Dolle Ugddat (You All Open Your Eyes), directed by Konkani theater director Mario Menezes. It was during this phase that Fernandes showcased his acting skills, leaving an impression with his portrayal of a gay character in Ghorabeache Vantte (Division of Family). Furthermore, he displayed his comedic prowess by taking on a humorous role in Sharon's Konkani film Tum Kitem Kortolo Aslo? (2010). Fernandes' talents extended beyond acting, as he proved to be a composer and singer. In Mario Menezes' tiatr Love Story from 2009, his interpretation of the opening chorus, along with his rendition of the song "Sobit Sopon" in Dominic Fernandes' Konkani CD Mainchem Sukh, showcased his musical talents. Prior to his involvement in tiatrs, Fernandes honed his musical skills by initially playing the keyboard instrument in a band. Subsequently, he demonstrated his skills in Konkani theatrical productions by Pascoal Rodrigues and Peter de Macazana. Known for his comedic timing and promising acting potential, Fernandes made appearances in several Konkani movies, demonstrating his versatility as a performer while showcasing his vocal talents.

In 2007, Mario Menezes, a director within the realm of Konkani theatre affiliated with Menezes Theatre, identified the talent of Fernandes and assigned him the lead comedian role in the acclaimed play Tumi Tumche Dolle Ughddat. Sharing the stage with the Konkani comedienne Joanna, Fernandes delivered a memorable performance that garnered praise from both the director and the audience. This success paved the way for Fernandes to become a regular fixture in Menezes' subsequent productions, including Naginn, Hi Maim Konnanchi, the 2009 play Kal Aiz ani Faleam, and the tiatr titled Beiman Kir released in the same year. However, Fernandes' acting engagements were restricted to only two productions, culminating in his final performance held in his hometown of Orlim. Beyond his theatrical pursuits, Fernandes also made appearances in Konkani video films. He featured in Jacki-E's Hanv Ankvar Kiteak Urlom, where he shared the screen with Anita. Additionally, Fernandes showcased his comedic skills in comedian Michael's Chor Police, as well as Martin de Ponda's productions Puro Anink Naka and Bhogos Saiba. Fernandes showcased his versatility beyond acting as a musician, showcasing his talent in composing lyrics and performing his own musical compositions. One of his popular compositions was the solo titled "Music, Music," which was sung by the young artist Rioma in the play Kal Aiz ani Faleam, a composition that left an impression on the audience. Fernandes' accomplishments include his performance of the song "Sobit Sopon" featured in the audio album "Mainche Sukh," created by Domnic and Fernandes and distributed by Manfa Music. His last stage appearance was in Mario Menezes' play Kal Aiz ani Faleam. Beyond his involvement in the performing arts, Fernandes also held the position of proprietor at Master Engineering, showcasing his versatility and diverse interests.

In Sharon Mazarello's tiatr Tum Kitem Kortolo Aslo? at the Kala Academy Goa's 30th Tiatr Competition 2004–2005, Fernandes was chosen to play a comedian, a character of a mechanic helper. This theatrical production was later adapted into a Konkani film in 2010, featuring Fernandes in the identical role, and was released after his death. In the original theatrical production, Fernandes' role of a humorous character of a mechanic's assistant, earned recognition for his comedic prowess with a merit certificate. In August 2008, Fernandes further expanded his artistic repertoire by taking part in Mario Menezes's tiatr production titled Ghorabeache Vantte (Division of Family). Displaying his comedic timing and musical abilities, Fernandes captivated audiences as a comedian and singer. The tiatr received acclaim and had successfully staged 82 performances across Goa before captivating audiences at Nashwan Hall in Al Nasr Leisureland, Dubai.

== Personal life ==
Fernandes originated from the ward of Palcut in the village of Orlim, located in Goa. He did not have any siblings, being the sole child of his parents. Fernandes was wedded to a young lady named Anisha.

== Death ==
On 17 October 2009, Fernandes, aged 26, died at Goa Medical College in Bambolim, Goa, following a short period of illness. His funeral took place on 20 October at 4:30 pm at St. Michael Church in Orlim, Goa. Surviving him were his wife, Anisha, and his parents, Martin and Josefa.

=== Reactions ===
Mario Menezes, a figure in the realm of Konkani theatre direction, expressed shock and loss upon receiving the news of Fernandes's sudden demise. Known for his talent and promising potential, Fernandes made a significant impact during his two-year involvement in the field with Menezes. He was also known for his commitment, diligent work ethic, exemplary conduct, and punctuality, Menezes stated, "Fernandes exemplified qualities that were rarely observed among emerging talents." Additionally, Menezes noted that Fernandes was well-regarded for his helpful nature and kind demeanor, as attested by others familiar with him. Theatre critic and writer J. P. Pereira from The Navhind Times characterized Fernandes as an individual with skills in comedy, singing, lyric composition, and music, highlighting his human qualities. Pereira also expressed his sympathy to the grieving family.
