= Benhur Silva =

Indian actor and director (born 1998)

- Silva in 2024
- Born: 11 November 1998 (age 27)
- Occupations: Actor, singer, writer, director
- Father: John D' Silva
- Relatives: Christ Silva (brother)

Benhur Shaan Silva (born 11 November 1998) is an Indian actor, singer, writer and director known for his work in Konkani films and tiatr productions. He began performing in tiatr as a child and later became involved in Konkani films and web series.

== Career ==
Silva began performing in tiatr productions at the age of 10. His first production was Ekvott, directed by his father, John D' Silva, in which Silva acted and sang. He subsequently appeared in other tiatr productions, including Rochnnar and Koddu.

Silva also appeared in Konkani VCD and telefilm productions, including Gondoll, Bhangoddeo, Bhognnar, Munna, Tallio and Lofdde. He sang on the audio album Ranni.

His early film work included appearances in Limits, Rakhonndar and Action, directed by his elder brother Christ Silva. In Rakhonndar (2015), Silva played Domnic, the son of a local minister.

=== Digital work ===
Silva founded Ethereal Productions, a filmmaking venture through which he produced short films and web series. In 2018, Silva created Rainbow, a five-episode Konkani web series released through the YouTube channel Ethereal Productions. The Herald described it as Goa's first five-episode web series in Konkani. Silva wrote the story, screenplay and dialogues and directed the series, in addition to appearing in the cast as Charlie, one of its principal characters.

Silva had written and directed short films including One Life, Hope, Chance and Circle before the release of Rainbow.

Silva subsequently directed The Malkiryads, a Konkani web series produced through Ethereal Productions. The series follows four friends and their experiences during and after college. Its first two seasons were released on YouTube, while the third and final season was presented at Ravindra Bhavan, Margao, in September 2022. Silva also appeared in the cast.

By September 2022, The Herald reported that the Ethereal Productions YouTube channel had more than 22,000 subscribers and more than 1.8 million views.

==== Films ====
He was also part of the cast of Connection (2017), and Crazy Mogi (2023), which was included in the Goan Films section of the International Film Festival of India (IFFI) Goa film guide.

== Filmography ==
=== Films ===
- Limits
- Rakhonndar (2015)
- Action
- Connection (2017)
- Crazy Mogi (2023)

=== Web series ===
- Rainbow (2018)
- The Malkiryads (2019–2022)

=== Tiatr ===
- Ekvott
- Rochnnar
- Koddu
