= Palomi Ghosh =

Indian actress

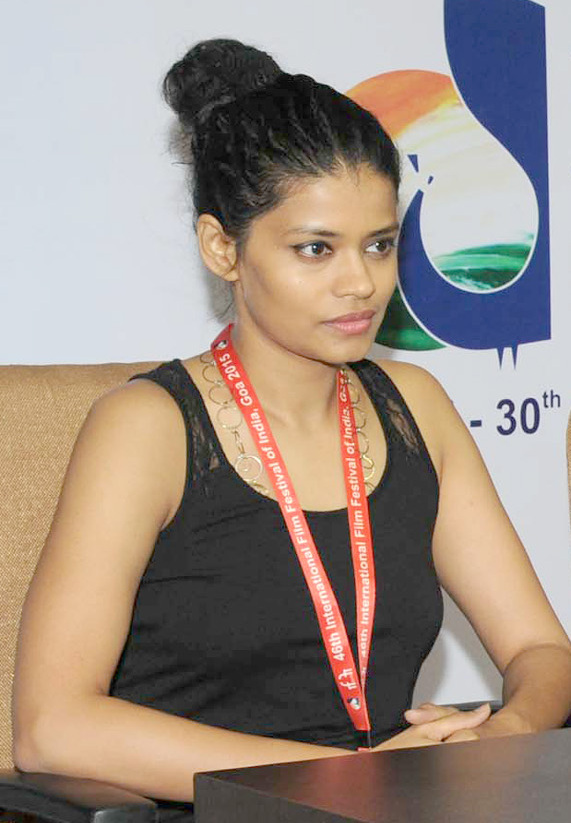
- Ghosh at IFFI 2015
- Born: Vadodara, Gujarat, India
- Education: North Carolina State University
- Occupation: Actress
- Years active: 2009–present
- Known for: Nachom-ia Kumpasar

Palomi Ghosh is an Indian actress best known for her work in Hindi, Konkani, and English language films. She is a recipient of the National Film Award – Special Mention for the Konkani musical drama Nachom-ia Kumpasar.

== Early life ==
Ghosh was born in Vadodara, Gujarat, India, with roots in West Bengal. Her family moved to the United States at an early age. She attended North Carolina State University, where she studied applied mathematics. After moving to Mumbai, she joined acting classes at Anupam Kher's acting institute and started working in theatre.

== Career ==
Ghosh made her debut in 2009 with the Australian film The Waiting City. She then appeared in the film Gandhi of the Month (2014). Her next release, Nachom-ia Kumpasar (2014), based on the goan singers Lorna Cordeiro and Chris Perry, met with critical acclaim. She received the National Film Award – Special Mention (feature film) at the 62nd National Film Awards. The film went on to win 24 international, 3 national, and 10 state awards, making it the most awarded Konkani film. She then appeared in Netflix's sci-fi series Sense8 (2015).

In 2016, she appeared in the critically acclaimed Hotel Salvation, which won numerous international awards, followed by K Sera Sera Ghodpachem Ghoddtelem which was featured in several international film festivals. The film was selected as the Best Feature Film in Konkani at the 64th National Film Awards. She then appeared in the TV series The Good Karma Hospital.

In 2019, she played the role of Meghan in Mission Over Mars. She starred as Jenny Fernandes in the Netflix series Typewriter (2019), directed by Sujay Ghosh. She received praise for her performance.

She has appeared in the Berkeley Repertory Theater's play Monsoon Wedding, the Musical, which was based on Mira Nair's film of the same name. She sang three songs in the film Helicopter Eela (2018).

== Filmography ==
Year	Title	Role	Language	Notes	Ref
2009	The Waiting City	Urmi	English	Debut	
2013	Scenes from Suburbia	Poulumi	Bengali	Short	
2014	Gandhi of the Month	Miss Thomas	English		
2014	Nachom-ia Kumpasar	Dona Pereira	Konkani	National Film Award – Special Mention (feature film)	
2015	Awakenings	Meera	Hindi, English	Short	
2015	Sense8		English	2 Episodes	
2016	Hotel Salvation	Sunita	English		
2016	K Sera Sera Ghodpachem Ghoddtelem	Sona Golvales	Konkani		
2017	The Good Karma Hospital	Nita Mehta	English	TV Series	
2017	Office vs. Office	Shikha Rastogi	Hindi	TV Series	
2018	Everything is Fine	Natasha	Hindi	Short	
2019	Typewriter	Jenny Fernandes	Hindi	TV Series	
2019	Mission Over Mars	Meghan	Hindi	TV Series	
2019	Satellite Shankar		Hindi		
2020	Kadakh	Chhaya	Hindi		
2021	Ankahi Kahaniya	Natasha	Hindi		
2021	Tryst With Destiny	Laxmi	Hindi, English	TV Series	
2026	Everybody Loves Sohrab Handa	Jayanti Chawla	Hindi	Zee5 Film	
