= Do Pal =

- CD cover
- Directed by: Ravi Rai
- Produced by: Rajesh Bhatia
- Starring: Akshay Anand; Dolly Sharma; Paresh Rawal
- Music by: Rajesh Roshan
- Release date: 18 October 1991
- Running time: 135 minutes
- Country: India
- Language: Hindi

Do Pal is a 1991 Indian Hindi-language film directed by Ravi Rai and produced by Rajesh Bhatia, starring Akshay Anand, Dolly Sharma and Paresh Rawal.

== Cast ==
- Akshay Anand as John
- Dolly Sharma as Dolly
- Paresh Rawal as Veljibhai
- Pascoal de Chicalim as Anthony

== Music ==
1. "Chori Yeh Man" - Lata Mangeshkar
2. "Pakadke Unglee" - Mohammed Aziz
3. "Deep Jalta Rahe" - Mohammed Aziz, Sadhana Sargam
4. "Pyar Mein Yeh Doorie" - Amit Kumar, Sadhana Sargam
5. "Ab To Mera Sona Chandi" - Udit Narayan

== Reception ==
Subhash K. Jha reviewed the film for The Indian Express.
