= Mission Over Mars =

2019 web series by Ekta Kapoor

- First look poster
- Also known as: M.O.M - Mission Over Mars
- Genre: Drama
- Created by: Ekta Kapoor
- Based on: Mars Orbiter Mission
- Developed by: Soma Roy
- Screenplay by: Sambit Mishra; Vinay Waikul
- Story by: Sambit Mishra
- Directed by: Vinay Waikul
- Creative director: Manjeet Sachdev (ALT Balaji)
- Starring: Sakshi Tanwar; Mona Singh; Nidhi Singh; Palomi Ghosh; Ashish Vidyarthi; Mohan Joshi
- Composer: NoizzeBoxx
- Country of origin: India
- Original language: Hindi
- No. of seasons: 1
- No. of episodes: 8 (list of episodes)

Production
- Executive producers: Meghann Malik (ALTBalaji); N B Rajkumar Patra (Endemol Shine India)
- Production locations: Mumbai, Maharashtra, India
- Cinematography: Soumik Mukherjee
- Editor: Gaurav Aggrawal
- Camera setup: Multi-camera
- Running time: 18-23 minutes
- Production company: Endemol Shine India

Original release
- Network: ALTBalaji; ZEE5
- Release: 10 September 2019

M.O.M. - Mission Over Mars is a 2019 Indian Hindi drama web series created by Ekta Kapoor. The series is developed and produced by Endemol Shine India for online streaming platforms ALTBalaji and ZEE5. The series stars Sakshi Tanwar, Mona Singh, Nidhi Singh and Palomi Ghosh as protagonists.

== Plot ==
The series is an intriguing tale of four female scientists who through their brilliance and dedication chart the journey of Indian Space Agency's Mars Orbiter Mission.

Mission Over Mars begins with a disappointing moment as ISRO's namesake ISA fails in its Chandravimaan mission and the entire blame falls on the shoulders of Moushmi Ghosh. It touches a nerve given Chandrayaan-2's Vikram lander losing control after it landed on the Moon's South Pole. Moushmi shines through as she plays a hot-headed scientist, forced to work with her ex-husband, a fellow scientist at the same space centre. Clad in crisp cotton saris, Moushmi Ghosh is dedicated to her dream but forgets to remember her only daughter's birthday. Nandita Hariprasad is her opposite—a calm and quiet mission coordinator who is a helicopter mom to her 18-year-old son.

== Cast ==
- Sakshi Tanwar as Nandita Hariprasad
- Mona Singh as Moushmi Ghosh
- Nidhi Singh as Neetu Sinha
- Palomi Ghosh as Meghan
- Ashish Vidyarthi as K. Murlidharan
- Mohan Joshi as Sharad Gokhale
- Chittaranjan Tripathy as Binayak Mohanty
- Utkarsh Majumdar as Bhaskar Ghosh
- Naisha Khanna as Lilavati Bhalekar
- Gaurav Sharma as Nikhil Bhalekar
- Suhaas Ahuja as Rajat Sinha
- Mihir Ahuja as Param Hariprasad
- Mona Ambegoankar as Sunita Vyas
- Purnendu Bhattacharya as Mayank
- Harssh Singh as Anant Vardhan
- Priyank Tiwari as Rakesh
- Nishit Broker as Swami
- Ankur Rathee as Gautam Gulati
- Pranav Manchanda as Venkat
- Micky Makhija as Jeejabhoy
- Manu Malik as Alok Hariprasad

== Episodes ==
No.	Title	Directed by	Written by	Original release date
1	"Chale To Chand Talak Nahi To Shaam Talak"	Vinay Waikul	Sambit Mishra and Vinay Waikul	10 September 2019
2	"To Mars"	Vinay Waikul	Sambit Mishra and Vinay Waikul	10 September 2019
3	"7 Rupees Per Kilometer"	Vinay Waikul	Sambit Mishra and Vinay Waikul	10 September 2019
4	"Phuljhadi Wala Rocket"	Vinay Waikul	Sambit Mishra and Vinay Waikul	10 September 2019
5	"100% Indian"	Vinay Waikul	Sambit Mishra and Vinay Waikul	10 September 2019
6	"Vighnaharta Ganesha"	Vinay Waikul	Sambit Mishra and Vinay Waikul	12 September 2019
7	"Never Say Never"	Vinay Waikul	Sambit Mishra and Vinay Waikul	12 September 2019
8	"Super Computer Vs Us"	Vinay Waikul	Sambit Mishra and Vinay Waikul	12 September 2019
