= Typewriter (TV series) =

Indian horror television series

- Promotional poster
- Genre: Horror drama
- Created by: Sujoy Ghosh
- Written by: Sujoy Ghosh; Suresh Nair
- Directed by: Sujoy Ghosh
- Starring: Purab Kohli; Palomi Ghosh; Jisshu Sengupta; Sameer Kochhar; Aarna Sharma; Bijou Thaangjam; Mikhail Gandhi; Palash Kamble; Aaryansh Malviya
- Theme music composer: Raja Narayan Deb
- Composer: Raja Narayan Deb
- Country of origin: India
- Original language: Hindi
- No. of seasons: 1
- No. of episodes: 5

Production
- Executive producer: Sujoy Ghosh
- Production locations: Bardes township, North Goa.
- Cinematography: Gairik Sarkar
- Editor: Dnyanada Samarth
- Running time: 43–54 minutes
- Production company: Sujoy Ghosh Studios

Original release
- Network: Netflix
- Release: 19 July 2019

Typewriter is an Indian horror drama television series, directed by Sujoy Ghosh, which stars Purab Kohli, Palomi Ghosh, Jisshu Sengupta and Sameer Kochhar in the lead roles. The series is set in Bardez township of Goa, and revolves around a haunted house and a book that captures the imagination of a group of wannabe ghost hunters.

It premiered on Netflix on 19 July 2019. The series was announced in November 2018. An American series Ghostwriter follows a similar premise.

== Synopsis ==
The story follows a group of children: Sameera (Sharma), Satyajit (Gandhi), and Devraj (Kamble), who live in Bardez, Goa. The inquisitive friends form a ghost club and decide to seek a ghost at an old haunted villa in their neighbourhood as their first mission. Their curiosity stems from an old story involving an old man who died in a novel called The Ghost of Sultanpore. However, before the children are able to discover the ghost, a new family moves in and the legend of the villa resurfaces with frightening intensity. The story revolves around the mystery behind the titular typewriter, which seems to harbor a grudge against those who try to remove it from the manor. It is further complicated by the narrative of past occupants, with the story jumping between decades. Sudden deaths, past of Sultanpore, and unnatural powers are also the storylines of the webseries.

== Cast and characters ==
=== Main ===
- Palomi Ghosh as Jenny Fernandes, mother of Nick and Anya
- Purab Kohli as Inspector Ravi Anand
- Jisshu Sengupta as Munna /Amit Roy, a mathematics teacher, faking as Roy, son of Fakeer.
- Sameer Kochhar as Peter Fernandes, Jenny's husband
- Aarna Sharma as Sameera "Sam" Anand, Inspector Anand's daughter and the leader of the ghost club
- Aaryansh Malviya as Nikhil a.k.a. Nick, member of the ghost club
- Palash Kamble as Devraj "Bunty" Banerjee, member of the ghost club
- Mikhail Gandhi as Satyajit "Gablu" Tandon, member of the ghost club
- Sara Gesawat as Anya Fernandes, Jenny's daughter and a violinist

=== Recurring ===
- K C Shankar as Inspector Selwyn
- Bijou Thaangjam as Inspector Sushant
- Aliraza Namdar as Father Mason
- Harish Khanna as Moses
- Rinki Singhavi as Inspector Mira
- Sonali Sachdev as Charu, mother of Bali / Fakeer. She has paranormal powers within her.
- Abhishek Banerjee as Bali / Fakeer, son of Charu, who inherited paranormal powers from his mother.
- Sumit Singh as Mr. Tandon, father of Gablu
- Kiran Ahuja as Mrs. Tandon, mother of Gablu
- Palash Dutta as Mr. Banerjee father of Bunty
- Debonita as Mrs. Banerjee, mother of Bunty
- Rammakant Daayama as Dr. Spirit, a fraud who claims to call spirits and ghosts

=== Guest stars ===
- Kanwaljit Singh as Madhav Matthew the ghost story writer. He died under suspicious circumstances.
- Elli Avram as Anita
- Meenacshi Martins as Maria Lopes, the maid
- Masood Akhtar as James Almeida, ex gardener of Madhav Matthew, owner of Goodhead bar
- Boloram Das as Harish (peon)
- Tulsi Das as Vacso Lopes
- Shruthy Menon as Carol, Jenny's mother, who died under mysterious circumstances

== Episodes ==
No.	Title	Directed by	Written by	Original release date
1	"Chapter 1: Four Kids and a Dog"	Sujoy Ghosh	Sujoy Ghosh; Suresh Nair	19 July 2019
The episode opens with a flashback wherein a young Jenny is tucked in bed by her grandfather Madhav Matthews in Bardez Villa in Bardez, Goa. She runs to her grandpa because she's afraid there's a ghost in her room. After looking throughout her room for the ghost and finding nothing he places her in bed to only realize the “real” Jenny is actually under her bed, hiding, and tells her grandpa there's something on her bed. Present day and the villa has been empty since the death of its owner and popular ghost story writer Madhav Matthews. In the present day, three kids namely Sameera (Sam), the daughter of the local Police Inspector, Devraj (Bunty), Satyajit (Goblu) and Sameera's dog Buddy start a Ghost Club, led by Sameera. Their first attempt at finding a ghost is in the Villa, based on the book "The Ghost of Sultanpore", which Madhav Matthews began writing on the very same day he died. However, their quest gets obstructed when Jenny, now a young woman, comes to live in the villa with her husband Peter, daughter Anya and son Nick. The family moved to the house after Peter accepted a new job in the nearby town. The three local youngsters befriend Nick and induct him into the group. Anya insists on keeping an old typewriter as a 'family heirloom', to which Jenny reluctantly agrees. One of the movers had been commissioned by a certain Amit Roy to steal the typewriter from the Villa. However, due to a disagreement over whether the mover should be paid despite not obtaining the typewriter, Amit kills the mover in the restroom of the Goodhead Bar. The math teacher from the local school suddenly disappears and is conveniently replaced by Amit. Sam's father and coworker go to investigate the murder and speak with the owner of the bar, James. He proceeds to tell Inspector Anand about the mysterious happenings that occurred in Bardez Villa when he served as the gardener when he was much younger. During the discussion James reveals information about Jenny's mother, Carol, her nanny, Sara, and Sara's husband, Moses. Meanwhile, the family experiences eerie feelings and sensations in the house.
2	"Chapter 2: Operation School Bell"	Sujoy Ghosh	Sujoy Ghosh; Suresh Nair	19 July 2019
Maria (maid) sees Jenny typing and then going upstairs in the house to take a shower. It becomes clear that Maria speaks a language unfamiliar to Jenny so they mime some of their communications. Moments later Jenny enters the house in the same hall where Maria just saw her go in the opposite direction, up the stairs. This visibly scares Maria and she runs out of the villa warning Jenny to leave, as well. Jenny is unable to understand exactly why Maria is afraid and eventually let's Maria run off. Jenny (the ghost) chases her and kills her by squeezing her heart, just by a motion of squeeze from a distance. A woman named Anita comes to Peter's office and demands 25 million, lost on some land deal. Mosses, the husband of nanny Sara is protecting the soul of Fakeer, on the behest of Amit Roy, under some duress. Jenny learns about Fakeer while rummaging old papers. The ghost club members want to attend Maria's burial which is at three. So they manage to reset the school clock by half an hour early and Harish, the official school bell ringer, rings the bell at three instead of three-thirty. They attend the funeral and create a commotion. When Jenny was going to the memorial service of Maria, James requests her to destroy the soul of Fakeer, which is somewhere in the villa. Hearing this, Jenny (the ghost) kills him the same way it killed Maria. Sam witnesses this and runs in the church, there to her shock and surprise she finds Jenny sitting on a pew.
3	"Chapter 3: The Ghost of Sultanpore"	Sujoy Ghosh	Sujoy Ghosh; Suresh Nair	19 July 2019
Sam wakes up from a dream where she is reading the novel written by Madhav Mathews. The place is Sultanpoor and the year is 1950. Charu is shown to have paranormal powers and she helps in euthanasing an ailing old man and explaining to her young son about her paranormal powers. While reading the book, Sam is attacked by the ghost that looks like Jenny who rips her heart out. She then wakes up and realises it was all just a nightmare. She goes and checks her father, just to know that he's asleep.
4	"Chapter 4: The Rise of the Fakeer"	Sujoy Ghosh	Sujoy Ghosh; Suresh Nair	19 July 2019
5	"Chapter 5: The Night of the Blood Moon"	Sujoy Ghosh	Sujoy Ghosh; Suresh Nair	19 July 2019
