= Damodar Mauzo =

Indian writer and novelist (born 1944)

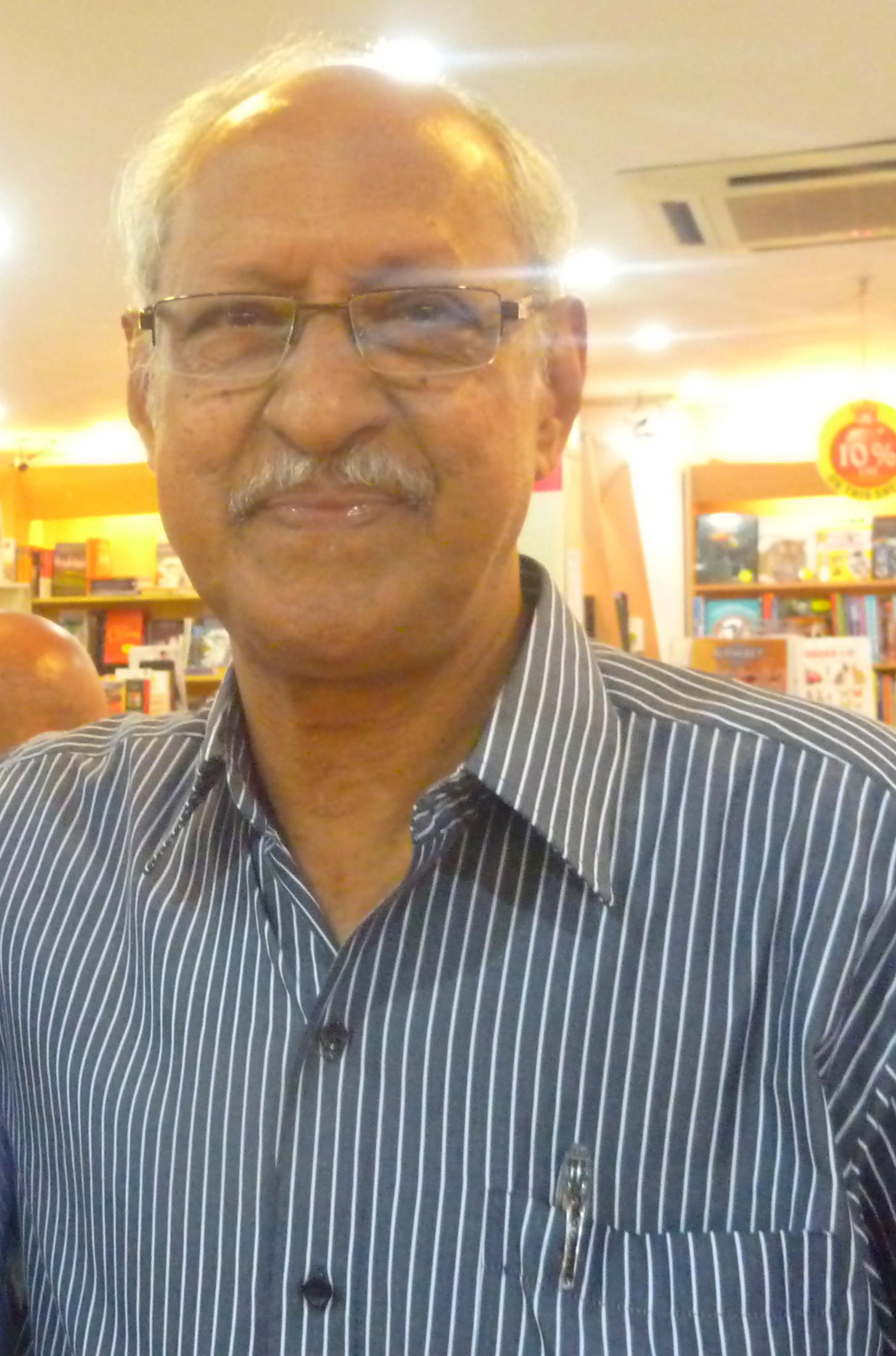
- Mauzo in 2013
- Born: 1 August 1944 (age 82); Majorda, Goa, Portuguese India
- Education: Secondary School Certificate (1961)
- Alma mater: R. A. Podar College (B.Com)
- Occupations: Writer; novelist; critic; screenwriter
- Notable work: Aleesha (2004)
- Board member of: Sahitya Akademi
- Spouse: Shaila Mauzo
- Children: 3
- Awards: Sahitya Akademi Award (1983); Jnanpith Award (2022)
- Website: damodarmauzo.com

Damodar Mauzo (born 1 August 1944) is an Indian short story writer, novelist, critic, and screenwriter in Konkani. He was awarded the 57th Jnanpith Award, India's highest literary honour, in 2022, Sahitya Akademi Award in 1983 for his novel Karmelin and the Vimala V. Pai Vishwa Konkani Sahitya Puraskar award for his novel Tsunami Simon in 2011. His collection of short stories Teresa's Man and Other Stories from Goa was nominated for the Frank O'Connor International award in 2015. He has served as a member of the executive board, general council, as well as the finance committee of the Sahitya Akademi.

== Early life (1944–1965) ==
Damodar Mauzo was born on 1 August 1944 to a Gaud Saraswat Brahmin (GSB) family, in Majorda, Goa, which was part of Portuguese India during the Portuguese Empire (now in India). His primary education was in the Marathi and Portuguese languages, while his secondary education was in English. He studied at the New Era High School, Margão.

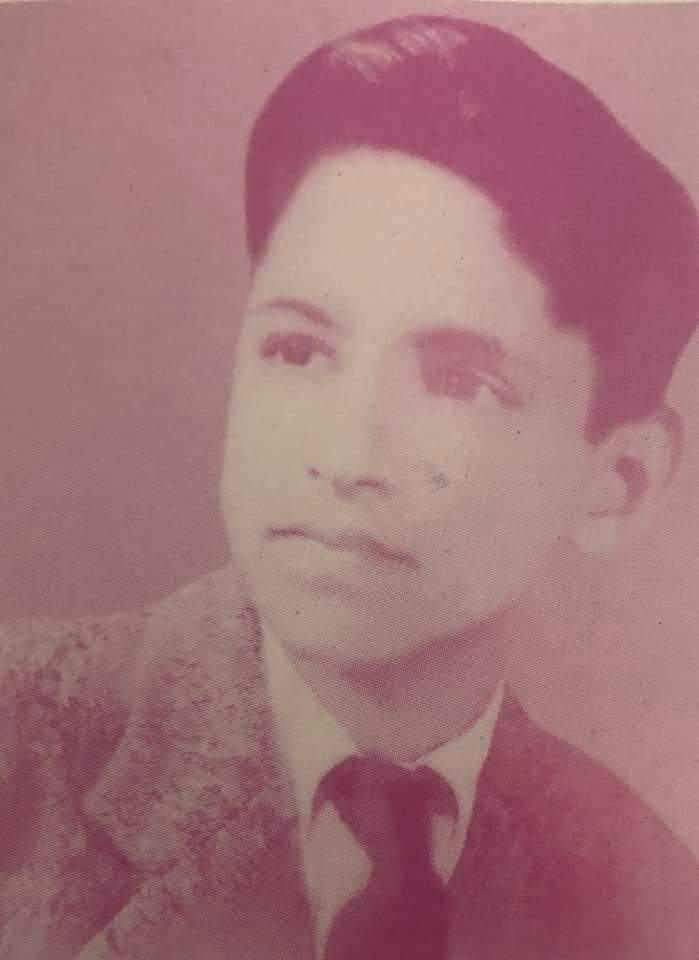
Mauzo during the c. 1950s

Mauzo lost his father at the age of 12. After this, he helped his uncle at the family shop alongside studying, until he passed the Secondary School Certificate Examination (SSCE) in 1961. After this, he moved to Bombay to continue his studies. He graduated from R. A. Podar College of Commerce and Economics, affiliated with Bombay University (Now Mumbai University) in Matunga where he got his B.Com degree. During his four years in Bombay, he began writing short stories in Konkani which were well received by the readers. Some of these were translated and published into English.

== Literary career (1971–present) ==
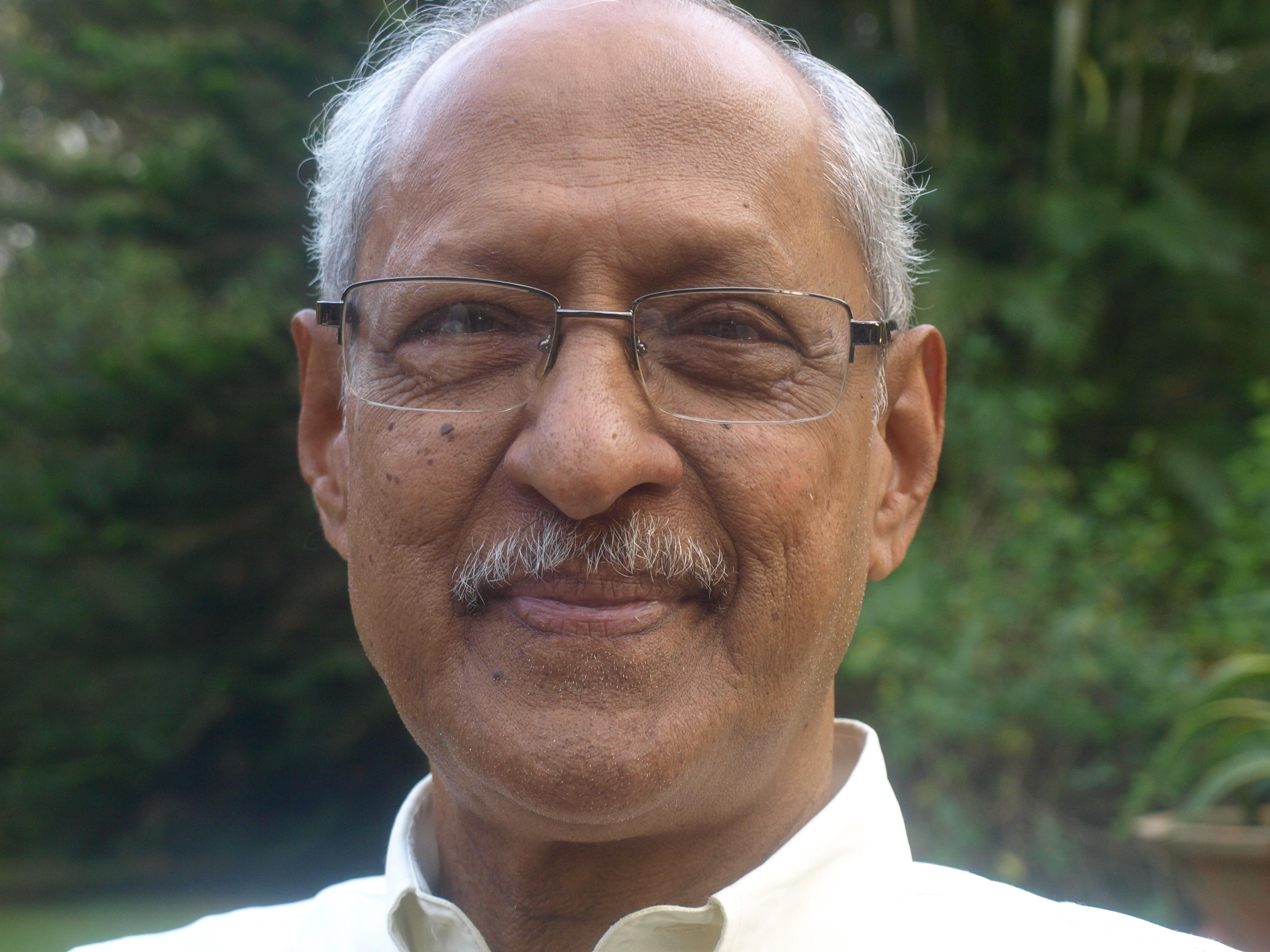
Mauzo in 2011

Mauzo after his graduation returned to Goa to run his family shop, this kept him close to the people of his village which is predominantly Catholic. This influence is obvious in his writing which is an authentic depiction of the life of Catholic people in Goa. He began his writing career with short stories with the first collection Ganthon published in the year 1971.So far he has authored five short story collections with Sapon Mogi in 2014 being the latest. Meanwhile, he wrote the novel Karmelin which won him the 1983 Sahitya Akademi Award. The novel deals with the suffering and sexual exploitation of the ayahs (house maids) working in Persian Gulf countries and it has been translated into twelve languages. Sood (1975) is a novella written about the revenge of a freedom fighter's son. In 2006, a film with the same title was made based on this novella.

After the tsunami hit the coast of Tamil Nadu in 1996, he wrote a novel, Tsunami Simon that won the Vishwa Konkani Kendra's Smt. Vimla V. Pai Puraskar. He has written screenplays and/or dialogues for five Konkani films namely Shitoo, Aleesha, Sood, O Maria and Enemy?. He has been presented at the Goa Film Festival the Best Screenplay Award for Aleesha and the Best Dialogues Award for Shitoo and O Maria. His stories have also been televised on the Indian national television. He critiqued stories appearing in the daily Sunaparant which was a premier Konkani daily. Although his creative output is in Konkani, he regularly writes in English for various local and national journals and periodicals. In 1985, he presided over the Akhil Bharatiya Konkani Sahitya Sammelan, which is an All India literary Conference. The Ministry of Culture, Government of India awarded him the Senior Fellowship in 2011-12 for the project on Pre and Post Colonial History of Konkani Literature.

== Personal life ==
Mauzo lives in Majorda, Goa with his wife Shaila. He has three daughters Rupali, Meghana and Sobita. Among them Rupali has taken to pen and has so far authored three books.

== Activism ==
An activist to the core, Mauzo actively participated in the historic Goa Opinion Poll held in Goa in 1967 to decide the political status of then newly liberated Goa. He motivated the people of Goa to vote in favour of retaining their distinct identity by rejecting the merger with the neighbouring state of Maharashtra. He was in the steering committee of Goa's successful popular movement Konkani Porjecho Avaz (1985–87) that had three demands viz, the official language status to Konkani, statehood to Goa, and inclusion of Konkani in the Eighth Schedule of the Constitution of India. He has served a five-year term as a member of the Executive Board and Finance Committee of Sahitya Akademi, New Delhi. Presently, he is the co-founder and co-curator of the Goa Arts and Literary Festival, an annual event that was started in 2010.

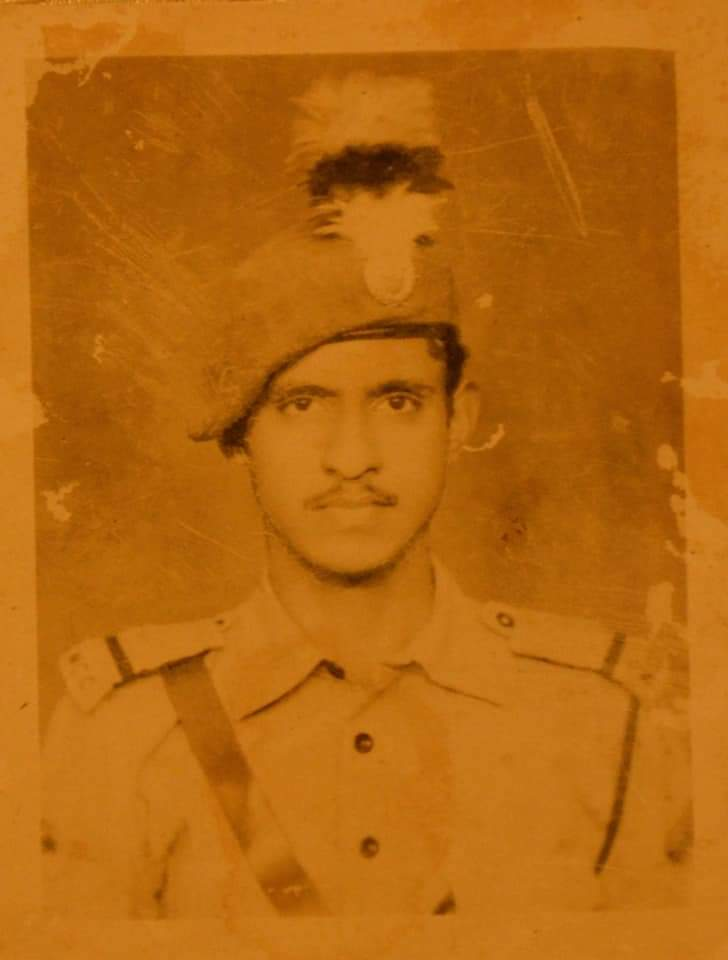
Mauzo in a NCC uniform, 1960s

In 2015, following the assassination of M. M. Kalburgi, Mauzo spoke up against the freedom of expression in the country, as well as the "moral policing by the protagonists of mono-culturism". In a letter to the then president of the Sahitya Akademi, Mauzo demanded that the Akademi send a strong message to those in power that the writers’ body would not tolerate any threat to their freedom. He expressed concern over the threat to the creativity of free thinking writers, and what he called the rising trend of intolerance in India.

In June 2018, Mauzo's life was under threat. The fact came to light after a special investigation team (SIT) of the Karnataka police, which was probing the murder of journalist-activist Gauri Lankesh in Bangalore, told the Goa police about the threat to Mauzo's life. The threat was allegedly from right-wing organisation Sanathan Sanstha, but the organisation denied the allegations.

In the aftermath of the threat, the author was given police protection. Several activists and writers got together to condemn the threat to Mauzo's life, while also calling for a ban on the Sanathan Sanstha.

== Release of Tishthavani ==
In July 2020, on account of the COVID-19 pandemic, Mauzo released a book of short stories, Tishthavani via an online session. It was his first-ever virtual book-launch.

Most of the stories in the book are set in Goa, but some which are set in other parts of the country. The story, "Jhel Vitalltana" (As the Ice Melts) is set against the backdrop of the warfare in Kargil. Another story "Sundarkayecho Upasaka" (The Aesthetist ), is about the fallacy of a wealthy man who claims to have aesthetic wisdom. The ambiance of this story is the affluent society of Mumbai.

== Works ==
=== Short fiction ===
Gathon 1971

Zagranna 1975

Rumad Ful 1989

Bhurgim Mhugelim Tim 2001

Sapan Mogi 2014

=== Novels ===
Sood 1975

Karmelin 1981

Tsunami Simon 2009

=== Children's books ===
Ek Ashillo Babulo 1976

Kani Eka Khomsachi 1977

Chittarangi 1995

=== Biographical ===
Oshe Ghodle Shenoy Goembaab 2003

Unch Haves Unch Mathem 2003

A documentary film titled 'Bhai Mauzo' (2014), produced by Sahitya Akademi, was made by Indranil Chakravarty on the life and work of the writer.

=== Works in Translation ===
Damodar Mauzo's works have been translated into various languages. The novel Karmelin was translated into twelve languages—Assamese, Bengali, Maithili, Nepali, Gujarati, Marathi, Sindhi, Punjabi, Tamil, Kannada, Malayalam, Hindi and English, after being published by Sahitya Akademi. The novel Tsunami Simon has been translated into English and published by Ponytale Books. These Are My Children a collection of short stories is translated into English and published by Katha Publications, New Delhi. Teresa's Man and Other Stories from Goa has been published by Rupa Publications, while Rumadful got translated asMirage by the Margao-based Cinnamon Teal Publishing house, in 2014. The same book is also translated into Marathi as Shantaterche Ghann, published by Srishti Prakashan. Mauzo's stories have appeared in Portuguese, French, English besides several Indian languages. The novel Tsunami Simon was published in translation into English by Ponytale Books and launched in 2013. Rajkamal Prakashan published Sapanmogi, a collection of stories, into Hindi as Swapnapremi in 2022. Penguin has published a collection of stories called The Wait under its Vintage imprint (2022). Mauzo's novel Jeev Divum Kai Chya Marum was published in Kannada as Jeeva Kodale, Chaha Kudiyale by Bahuvachana Publishing House in Bangalore (2021). and into Marathi by Majestic Prakashan as Jeev Dyava ki Chaha Ghyava in 2022. An English version is expected (as of October 2022).

== Awards ==
1973 Konkani Bhasha Mandal Literary Award for Gathon

1973 Goa Kala Academy Literary Award for Ganthon

1976 Konkani Basha Mandal Literary Award for Zagranna

1977 Konkani Basha Mandal Best Drama Manuscript Award for Nillem Nillem Sovnne Ek

1978 Goa Kala Academy Literary Award for Kanni Eka Khomsachi

1983 Sahitya Akademi Award for Karmelim

1997 The Best Dialogues Award at the Goa State Film Festival for the film Shitoo

1998 Katha Award for the Story Minguel's kin

2003 Janaganga Puraskar for Bhurgim Mhugelim Tim

2005 The Best Screen Play Award at the Goa State film festival for the film Aleesha

2006 Goa State Reward for Cultural Excellence at the National Level by Directorate of Art and Culture, Government of Goa.

2007 Goa State Cultural Award by Directorate of Art and Culture, Government of Goa.

2011 Vishwa Konkani Kendra's Vimala V Pai Sahitya Puraskar for Tsunami Simon

2013 Goan Achievers Awardconferred by The Navhind Times and Viva Goa.

2014 The Best Dialogues Award for the film O Maria at the Goa State film festival.

2016 Podar Ratna awarded by R.A.Podar College of Commerce and Economics, Mumbai

2022 he received the Jnanpith award.
