= Aparna Raina =

Indian production designer

- Education: Lady Shri Ram College
- Occupation: Production designer
- Years active: 2006–present
- Website: aparnaraina.com

Aparna Raina is an Indian production designer. She started her career in 2006 as an art assistant on the film Khosla Ka Ghosla and a set dresser in the critically-acclaimed film The Namesake. Since then she has worked on several films as art director and production designer. She was recently recognized for her work in the hit Konkani language film Nachom-ia Kumpasar, for "convincingly recreating spaces from a different era and with minute attention to detail". She was awarded the 62nd National Film Awards for Best Production Design for Nachom-ia Kumpasar.

== Filmography ==
Art Director

- 2012 Jodi Breakers
- 2010 Action Replayy
- 2008 Jaane Tu... Ya Jaane Na
- 2008 Thoda Pyaar Thoda Magic
- 2007 Just Married: Marriage Was Only the Beginning!
- 2005 Being Cyrus: Nominated for the 2007 Filmfare Award for Best Art Direction

Production Designer

- 2014 Everest (TV Series) (12 Episodes)
- 2014 Nachom-ia Kumpasar (Konkani)
- 2013 I, Me aur Main
- 2013 Dhoom Anthem (music video) (Yash Raj Films)
- 2011 My Friend Pinto
- 2008 Jaane Tu... Ya Jaane Na
- 2005 Being Cyrus

Art Department

- 2006 Khosla Ka Ghosla (Assistant Art Director)
- 2006 The Namesake (Set Dresser: India)

== Awards ==
2015 National Film Award for the Best Production Design (Film: Nachom-ia Kumpasar)
