= Nirmillem Nirmonem =

Konkani-language Film

- Directed by: Melwin Elpel
- Written by: Henry D'Silva
- Screenplay by: Norbert John D'Souza
- Story by: Henry D'Silva
- Produced by: Henry D'Silva
- Starring: Prathap Menezes: Seema Buthello; Hera Pinto; Norbert John D'Souza; Godwin Sparkle; Meenakshi Martin; Humbert Fernandes; Ronnie Fernandes; Charles Gomes; Late Vinny Fernandes
- Cinematography: Manjunath Hegde
- Edited by: Chandu Vuppalapati
- Music by: Pappan Joswin; Nandhu J Jabez; Wilfy Rebimbus
- Production company: Preston Enterprises
- Release date: 23 August 2019
- Running time: 142 minutes
- Country: India
- Language: Konkani

Nirmillem Nirmonem is a 2019 Indian Konkani-language romantic film directed by Melwin Elpel and produced by Henry D'Silva Suratkal. The film stars Prathap Menezes, Hera Pinto and Seema Buthello in the lead roles. The film's background score is composed by Nandhu J Jabez, music by Pappan Joswin with cinematography handled by Manjunath Hegde and editing done by Chandu Vuppalapati.

After the success of Nashibaso Khel(2016) film this is the second film produced by Henry D'silva under the banner of Preston Enterprises. Nirmillem Nirmonem was released theatrically on 23 Aug 2019, and generally received positive reviews from critics, praising the cast performances (particularly Hera Pinto, Prathap Menezes, Meenakshi Martins and Seema Buthello).

== Plot ==
The film revolves around the lives of Linora, a rich child and Sunny, a foster kid of a priest who grew up in a quiet village of Mangalore. They have an excellent childhood and grow up together.

All is well when suddenly life takes a turn and they are separated. Linora marries a NRI businessman, Godwin, and flies to Dubai, Realising this depressed Sunny has a car accident in the middle of the night driven by Dr. Hera. She takes care of him until he recalls his past. Hera develops a bond with Sunny but he refuses her proposal as he only loved Linora and returns to the priest in the foster house.

At the end when Linora realises her betrayal towards Sunny returns to the homeland but it was too late as he had already moved on and found his life's true purpose.

== Cast ==
- Prathap Menezes as Sunny
- Seema Buthello as Linora
- Hera Pinto as Hera
- Meenakshi Martins as Nora
- Norbert John D'Souza as Joy
- Humbert Fernandes as Butler
- Arun Nazareth as Butler
- Reshma Sawant as housekeeper, Sunny's mother
- Noyal D'Souza as bad guy
- Ronnie Fernandes as Priest

Other Casts include Charles Gomes, Godwin Sparkle, MC Preetham, Jhon, Kavitha Miyar, Social Pinto.

Actress Vinny Fernandes (63) one of the cast members of the film died due to cardiac arrest on Thursday 29 July 2021.

== Production ==
Melwin Elpel after Hutthadha Suttha (2018), a Kannada-language suspense-thriller film, makes his konkani debut with Nirmillem Nirmonem. Norbert John D'Souza who also worked on Hutthadha Suttha as co-director joins Nirmillem Nirmonem as an actor in a negative role along with co-directing it with Melwin. He also serves as a screenwriter for the movie.

The muhurat of the film was held on 12 August 2018 at Suratkal Sacred Heart Church, Fr.Paul Pinto and Fr. Andrew claps the Muhurat Shot. Under this schedule interval and hospital scenes were shot. The schedule wrapped up after 6 days of shoot.

The third and final schedule of the film along with song shoot took place in January 2019 and After 45 days of filming, the makers wrapped up the shoot.

== Music ==
The film's background score is composed by KGF fame Nandhu J Jabez. The music is given by Pappan Joswin.

Film's audio and trailer launch was held at St Sebastian Church Mini Auditorium, Bendur on 14 July 2022.

No.	Title	Lyrics	Singer(s)	Length
1.	"Band Vazta"	Wilfy Rebimbus	Babitha Pinto & Ashwin D'costa	03:26
2.	"Chandneache Raatim"	Wilfy Rebimbus	Veena Rebimbus Pais & Clement Fernandes	05:28
3.	"Lenora"	Wilfy Rebimbus	Nihal Tauro	04:56
4.	"Ratichi Needh Maka"	Wilfy Rebimbus	Nihal Tauro	04:02
5.	"Sauli Tuji Zaun"	Wilson Kateel	Meghna	02:58
Total length:				20:10

== Release ==
The film was theatrically released on 23 August 2019 across coastal Karnataka. Theatres including Multiplexes like PVR, Big Cinemas and Single screens including Amarashree Talkies and Planet Cinema

- The Malayalam-dubbed version was released on 27 September 2019 at Mehboob Theatre Kasaragod.
- In Israel on 11 Oct 2019 at Cinema Theque, Tel Aviv, Israel.
- It got released in Kuwait at the American International School Auditorium – Maidan Hawally on 15 November 2019, under the banner of "Abbasiya Konkani Families Kuwait (A.K.F.K).
- In Doha, Qatar at the Asian Town Cinema Hall#4 on 29 November 2019.
- In Dubai on Valentines Day 14 February 2020 at Novo Cinemas, Ibn Batuta Mall followed by Sharjah show is being scheduled for Friday 21 February 2020 in Novo Cinemas, Mega Mall, Sharjah.

== Distribution ==
Nirmillem Nirmonem became the first Konkani film to get dubbed into Malayalam, sold rights to Kerala based M Cinemas.
