= Tum Kitem Kortolo Aslo? =

2010 Indian film in Konkani

- Poster of the film
- Directed by: Sharon Mazarello
- Written by: Sharon Mazarello
- Produced by: Sharon Mazarello; Wilson Mazarello
- Starring: Sharon Mazarello; Pradip Naik; Franky Gonsalves
- Cinematography: Dominic Dias
- Music by: Balthazar Fernandes
- Production company: ShaMaz Films
- Release date: 22 October 2010 (Kuwait)
- Running time: 120 minutes
- Country: India
- Language: Konkani

Tum Kitem Kortolo Aslo? (transl. What Would You Have Done?) is a 2010 Indian Konkani language film written and directed by Sharon Mazarello. The film also features Mazarello in the lead role. The story is about infidelity, from the perspective of the woman. It was produced by Mazarello and her husband, Wilmix Mazarello, under the banner of ShaMaz Films. The film premiered at the Cinescope Metro in Kuwait on 22 October 2010, marking the 60th anniversary of the release of Mogacho Anvddo, the first Konkani film. With this film, Mazarello became the first woman to direct a Konkani movie.

== Plot ==
Shaina (Sharon Mazarello) and Johnny (Pradip Naik) are a newly wed couple. Johnny always goes abroad for long trips, leaving his wife behind. She then bonds with Johnny's good friend Sammy (Franky Gonsalves), and she eventually ends up cheating on Johnny with Sammy.

== Cast ==
Main cast

- Sharon Mazarello as Shaina
- Pradip Naik as Johnny
- Franky Gonsalves as Sammy

Supporting cast

- Effie Fernandes
- Fermeeno Goes
- Humbert Fernandes
- Wilson Mazarello
- Bobet Fernandes
- Claron Mazarello
- Eddison Fernandes
- Frazeo Fernandes
- Jose Mario Fernandes
- Remmie Fernandes
- Elvis Mascarenhas

== Accolades ==
The film was greatly appreciated at the Colour of the Nile International Film Festival in Africa, the Addis International Film Festival, Ethiopia, 2011 and the Marbella International Film Festival, Spain, 2011. It was also screened at the 42nd International Film Festival of India. In 2014, on the occasion of Konkani Cinema Day, the film was selected for a special screening by the Dalgado Konknni Akademi.

== See also ==
- Paltadacho Munis
- Nachom-ia Kumpasar
