= Christ Silva =

Indian filmmaker

- Silva in 2012
- Born: Christ Sunjo Silva; 5 October 1993 (age 33); Margao, Goa, India
- Occupation: Filmmaker
- Father: John D' Silva
- Relatives: Benhur Silva (brother)

Christ Sunjo Silva (born 5 October 1993) is an Indian filmmaker known for his work in Konkani films. He is known for directing films such as Connection (2017) and Crazy Mogi (2023).

== Early life and education ==
Silva was born in Margao, Goa. He trained as a mechanical engineer before entering filmmaking. He is the son of Konkani comedian John D' Silva.

== Career ==
Silva began his filmmaking career with the telefilm Limits (2013), followed by Action (2016), a Konkani feature film. He later wrote and directed Connection (2017), a Konkani-language thriller film employing a non-linear narrative structure with multiple character perspectives. The film received attention in Goan media and was screened across the state following its release.

Silva's subsequent film Crazy Mogi (2023) was selected for screening in the Goan section of the International Film Festival of India. It was later screened for Konkani-speaking audiences in locations including Kuwait and Qatar. Silva also wrote and edited the third season of Goa's popular Konkani web series The Malkiryads.

== Awards ==
Connection received multiple awards at the Goa State Film Festival, including awards in categories such as story and editing.

At the 12th Goa State Film Festival (2025), Crazy Mogi earned 14 awards. Christ himself received 5 individual honours, including Best Director, Best Story, Best Screenplay, Best Dialogues and Best Editor for Crazy Mogi.

At the 11th Goa State Film Festival, Christ also won the Best Dialogues award for Pedru Poder (shared with Jojo D'Souza).

== Filmography ==
- Limits (2013) - director
- Action (2016) - director
- Connection (2017) - director, writer
- Crazy Mogi (2023) - director, writer
