= John D' Silva =

Indian actor and comedian (born 1964)

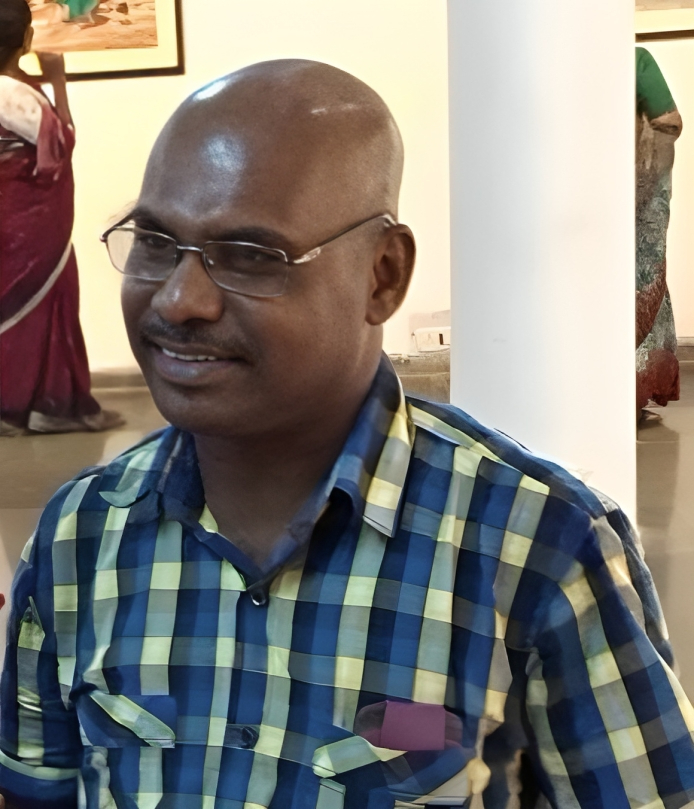
- Silva at the Kala Academy, 2015
- Born: João Francisco Silva; 20 February 1964 (age 62); Sancoale, Goa, India
- Occupations: Actor; comedian; playwright; director
- Years active: 1987–present
- Children: Christ Silva; Benhur Silva
- Awards: Yuva Srujan Puraskar (2008); Limca Book of Records (2010)
- Website: facebook.com/john.dsilva.94

João Francisco Silva (born 20 February 1964), known professionally as John D' Silva, is an Indian actor, comedian, playwright, and director known for his work in Konkani films and tiatr productions. Referred to as the "Emperor of the Konkani stage", he is the first tiatrist (theatre performer) to enter the Limca Book of Records in 2010 for acting, writing, directing and producing 25 tiatrs having a double alphabet in their titles. He has been described as a superstar of Konkani cinema.

Silva is also the first tiatrist to have released his 25th tiatr nattok in London and Germany and thereafter to have staged it throughout the state of Goa. He has also acted in the Konkani movies Padri (2005), O Maria (2010), Nachom-ia Kumpasar (2015), Nirmon (2015) and O La La (2018). He is the first tiatrist to have received the inaugural Yuva Srujan Puraskar award for the year 2008 from the Government of Goa for his contributions to Konkani theatre. He has acted in the Hindi TV series Bhabiji Ghar Par Hain! and the Hindi webseries Kankhajura.

His YouTube channel is the first Goan individual Konkani channel to receive the Silver Play Button in 2025.

== Select filmography ==
- Padri (2005)
- O Maria (2010)
- Home Sweet Home (2014)
- Home Sweet Home 2 (2015)
- Nachom-ia Kumpasar (2015)
- Connection (2017)
- Amizade (2018)
