= Amizade =

2018 Indian film in Konkani

- Poster of the film
- Directed by: Aniket Arun Naik
- Written by: Rahul Vichare; Aniket Arun Naik; Sai Pai Panandikar
- Produced by: Sachin Verlekar
- Starring: John D'Silva; Rajiv Hede; Siddhant Kanekar; Gaurav Pokle; Chetan Upadhay; Dhruv Sincró; Vaishnavi Pilankar
- Cinematography: Prashant Misale
- Edited by: Nitin FCP (Paperboyz Studioz)
- Music by: Rithesh and Shridhar
- Production company: Om Creative Film Works
- Distributed by: Bymistake Motion Pictures
- Release date: 7 December 2018 (Goa)
- Running time: 143 minutes
- Country: India
- Language: Konkani

Amizade (transl. Friendship) is a 2018 Indian Konkani-language action film written and directed by Aniket Arun Naik, and produced by Sachin Verlekar's Om Creative Film Works, in partnership with Bymistake Motion Pictures. It stars Konkani actors John D'Silva and Rajiv Hede and is the debut film of Siddhant Kanekar, Gaurav Pokle, Chetan Upadhay, Dhruv Sincro and Vaishnavi Pilankar. The film is about love and the journey of four good friends and their friendship. The film's trailer was launched at the Goa Marathi Film Festival in 2018, and its poster was released at the 48th International Film Festival of India by the then Chief Minister of Goa Manohar Parrikar. The film was released on 7 December 2018.

== Cast ==
- John D'Silva as Bebo
- Siddhant Kanekar as Abhi
- Gaurav Pokle as Siddhu
- Dhruv Sincró as Ghodo
- Vaishnavi Pilankar as Suzy
- Rajiv Hede as D'Souza, the ruthless politician
- Chetan Upadhay as Alwin D'Souza, the politician's brother

== Production ==
Aniket Naik has been working in Mumbai's film industry since 2007, working on films like Ferrari Ki Sawaari, John Day, Hridayanath, many advertisements, and has even worked as the second assistant director for the Hollywood film Hidden. Making a Konkani film with this prior experience in filmmaking was thus a long time dream of his. Working on the script for nearly two years, he collaborated with producer Sachin Verlekar to make the film. Naik chose many amateur debutantes for the film and got them trained further before beginning the filming. The music for this movie is given by the music director duo Rithesh-Shridhar.

== See also ==
- Konkani cinema
- Juze
