= Rajendra Talak =

Indian film director

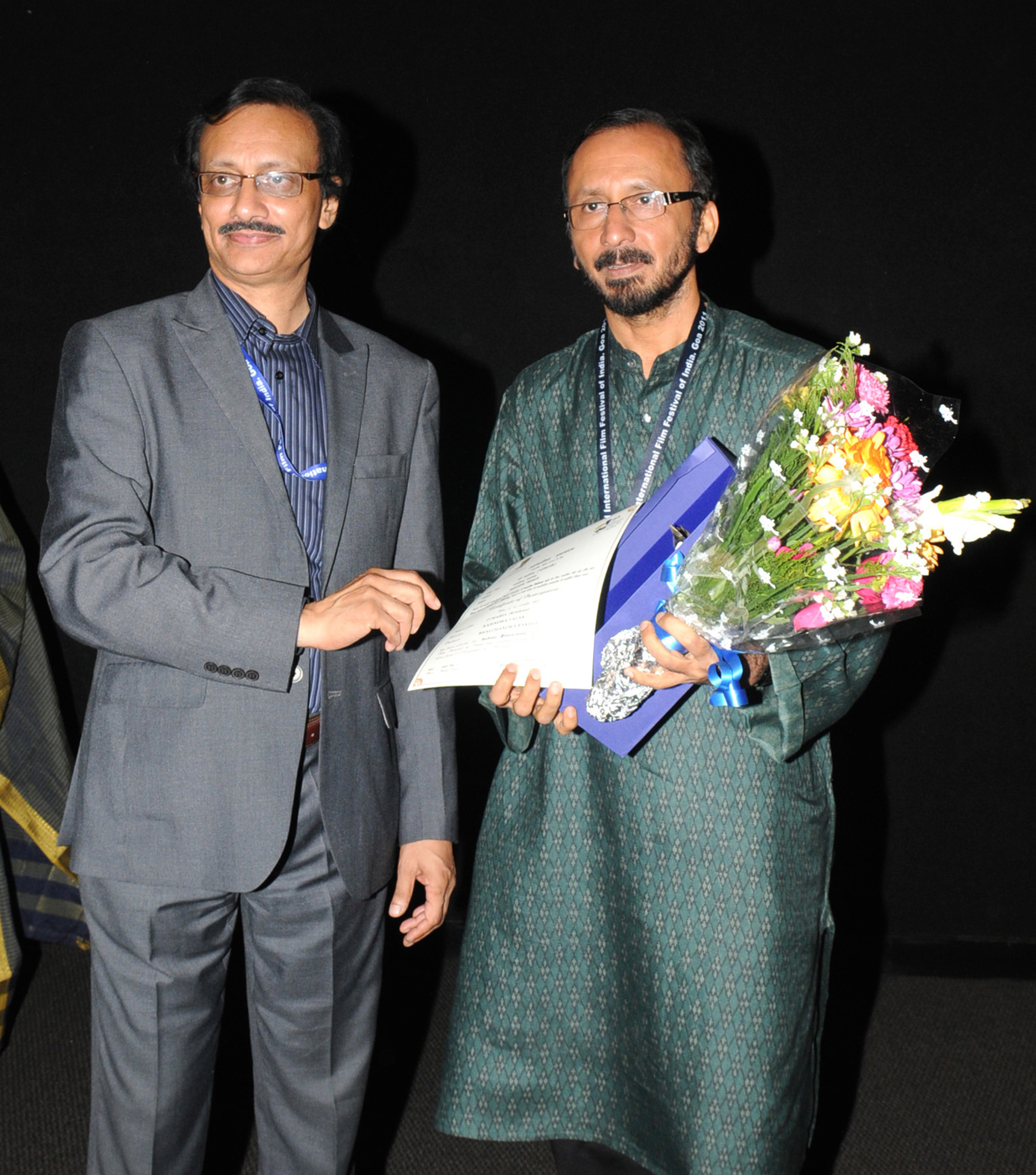
- Talak (right) in 2011
- Born: Comba, Goa, India
- Education: Parvatibai Chowgule College (BSc)
- Occupation: Film director
- Years active: 1994–present
- Known for: O Maria; Aleesha
- Spouse: Priyanka Bidaye
- Children: 3

Rajendra Talak is an Indian film director. He is best known for his award-winning Konkani films, such as Aleesha and O Maria.

== Early life ==
Talak was born in Comba, Margao, Goa, India. He attended the Mahila Nutan and Popular High Schools in Margao and later joined Parvatibai Chowgule College, from which he graduated with a bachelors of science. He was a state-ranked table tennis player, and represented his college in table tennis and badminton competitions.

In the 1970s, Talak was a member of tabla player Sushant Keshav Naik's music group, Mahesh Kumar & Party. The group later became part of the Gomant Vidya Niketan Kala Vibha and produced award-winning Marathi dramas. Talak gained experience in drama and theatre, which led to his interest in cinema. While composing the music for their play, Shitu, Talak concluded that the story had potential for a film and began working in filmmaking.

== Career ==
Talak began his career with the tele-film Shitu in 1994, which was based on a child widow. Director Shyam Benegal, who was invited for the film's release, praised Talak's work.

In 2002, Talak decided to make a film about the pollution caused by mining in Goa. After learning that Goa would host the International Film Festival of India in 2004, Talak expedited the filming and post-production of Aleesha. The film premiered at the 35th International Film Festival of India and won the National Film Award for Best Feature Film in Konkani at the 52nd National Film Awards.

His next film was bilingual, titled Antarnad in Konkani and Savalee in Marathi, and premiered at the IFFI 2006. It won five national awards and seven state awards. He then made another bilingual film, Saavariyaa.com in 2009, about 'internet marriages' in Goa. His 2010 film, O Maria, dealt with the loss of identity that Goa faced and was a commercial success in the state.

In 2014, Talak released the Marathi film A Rainy Day, which was about corruption. It was screened at the Jagran Film Festival in Mumbai in 2014.

In 2016, Talak was appointed as the Vice-Chairman of Entertainment Society of Goa (ESG) by the Government of Goa. Entertainment Society of Goa co-hosts the International Film Festival of India.

In 2019, Rajendra Talak directed the drama film Miranda House.

== Filmography ==
Year	Title
1994	Shitu
2004	Aleesha
2006	Antarnad (Konkani)
2007	Savalee (Marathi)
2009	Saavariyaa.com
2010	O Maria
2014	A Rainy Day
2019	Miranda House

== Personal life ==
Talak also runs a construction business named "Talak Constructions". He also co-founded the "Kalangan Centre for Performing Arts" in Margao, of which he has previously been the president. Talak has planted trees under the Swachh Bharat Mission in his hometown of Margao. He helps in the landscaping of mini gardens in the city.

Talak lives in Borda, Margao, with his wife, Priyanka Bidaye (who starred in Aleesha) and son Manas.
