= Wilfy Rebimbus =

Indian singer and songwriter (1942–2010)

Wilfred Rebimbus

Background information
- Also known as: Wilfy
- Born: Wilfred Gerald Rebimbus; 2 April 1942; Mangalore, Madras Presidency, British Raj
- Died: 9 March 2010 (aged 67)
- Genres: Folk; pop; Konkani music
- Occupations: Singer; songwriter; lyricist; playwright
- Website: wilfyrebimbus.com

== Early life ==
Wilfy Rebimbus, also, known as Konkan Kogull, was born on April 2, 1942, in Mangalore City. He is the proud son of late Landeline Rebimbus and late Magdeline Mendonca. In 1956, at the age of 14, started Composing Konkani songs and sang it. In 1957, at the age of 15 he wrote his first drama Poishanso Sounsar and staged it through St.Joseph’s Natak Sangh.

He had his primary and high school education at Milagres High School in Mangalore, currently Mangaluru. Later, he did a mechanical course before joining St Joseph's Workshop as an apprentice.

== Career ==
Rebimbus was a singer early in his life, he had won prizes in various singing events.

He had started composing Konkani songs at the age of 14 and authored his first drama Poixeancho Sonvsar (The World of Money) when he was 15 and staged it through the St. Joseph's Natak Sangh.

He founded the musical group called United Youngsters Music Party in 1959 when he was 17. It is now known as United Youngsters Cultural Association.

== Other activities ==
Apart from singing, Rebimbus was also an athlete and Kabaddi player during his school days.

== Creative output ==
He is credited for taking modern Konkani music to new heights with his unique compositions and singing style. He wrote songs for numerous occasions and situations. In a career spanning about four decades, he wrote thousands of songs and staged a total of 248 Wilfy Nites.

He has released approximately forty albums, six devotional albums and at least one instrumental album.

His poetry works comprise Vinchnar Podam (nine volumes), Kogull Gaita (two volumes), and audio cassettes and albums (47 in all).

On his 60th birthday in 2002, a third edition of a collection of songs called Kogul Gautha (The Koel Sings) was scheduled for release, together with a special edition of Poinnari, a weekly that dedicated an issue to Rebimbus. Wilfy composed his first song in 1952, wrote a stage play in 1958, and performed his first music show in 1971. His 100th show came about in 1989 and his 200th in 199. He was credited with having written 2500 songs, produced 33 audio cassettes, and six volumes of devotional songs, besides composing music and songs for Konkani movies, as of 2002. He wrote nine plays, some of which were broadcast over All India Radio's Mangalore station.

== Konkan Kogul title ==
Rebimbus was given the title Konkan Kogul by the Bishop of Mangalore at that time, the Late Basil Salvadore D'Souza on 26 September 1971.

== Legacy ==
Mandd Sobhann, a Mangalore-based Konkani cultural organisation, announced in 2009, that it would confer the Konkani music lifetime achievement award to Rebimbus "for his unparalleled contribution to Konkani music."

Former Karnataka chief minister and ex-union minister Veerappa Moily has described Rebimbus, "His talent is uncomparable; his legacy is unparallel[ed]. Rebimbus is undoubtedly an epochmaker."

A singing contest has been held in his name in the year 2013.

=== Research work based on Rebimbus ===
Antony Mavrel Lobo of Christ University, Bangalore, submitted a thesis in July 2019 on Representation of Konkani music and culture through the works of Wilfy Rebimbus. In it, he argues that "according to the research conducted by Konkani Sahithya Academy, in Mangalore there are 42 dialects of Konkani, where people speak the same language using a few different words in the state of Karnataka."

== Personal life ==
He married Meena Gracia Rebimbus, who is also a popular singer, on 25 January 1970. She was given the title of Konkan Myna, named after another popular singing bird, by Benar Productions on 12 August 1984 for her melodious voice.

Meena has also composed few songs in Rebimbus' albums namely, Nach to ka Vetha, Asha and Kuhu Kuhu which was a tribute to him after his death.

Rebimbus and Meena together had two children, Veena Rebimbus Pais, and Vishwas Rebimbus. They are also singers and composers, and have continued their father's legacy by releasing an album in 2011 Tum Maka Hav Tuka.

On 13 June 2010, Bishop Dr. Aloysius Paul D’Souza conferred the title Pro Ecclesia Et Pontifice awarded by Pope Benedict XVI on Konkan Kogul Wilfy Rebimbus posthumously during the Mass held at the prominent Milagres Church of Mangalore. The special honour has been given to Wilfy for his love towards Church and his extraordinary musical contributions to the Konkani community worldwide. The bishop handed the title to Meena Rebimbus.

== Illness and death ==
Rebimbus was diagnosed with lung cancer and underwent surgery in September 2009. He died of complications from lung cancer on 9 March 2010.

After his death at the age of 67, his remains were kept for public viewing at the St. Joseph's Seminary Church at Jeppu in Mangaluru on March 11, 2010. He was buried at the Jeppu Cemetery.
