= Nachom-ia Kumpasar =

- Nachom-ia Kumpasar
- Directed by: Bardroy Barretto
- Written by: Bardroy Barretto; Mridul Toolsidas; Angelo Braganza
- Screenplay by: Bardroy Barretto; Mridul Toolsidas
- Story by: Bardroy Barretto
- Produced by: Goa Folklore Productions
- Starring: Vijay Maurya; Palomi Ghosh
- Cinematography: Suhas Gujarathi
- Edited by: Bardroy Barretto; Lionel Fernandes; Shweta Venkat
- Music by: Chris Perry; Ronnie Monserrate; Jacob (Jackson) Pereira
- Production company: Goa Folklore Productions
- Release date: 4 December 2014
- Running time: 157 minutes
- Country: India
- Language: Konkani
- Budget: est. ₹4 crore (equivalent to ₹6.6 crore or US$700,000 in 2026)

Nachom-ia Kumpasar (English: Let's dance to the rhythm), is a Konkani musical drama film. It is based on the lives of two jazz musicians, Chris Perry and Lorna. The film, which takes its title from the name of a song by the two artists, was directed by Bardroy Barretto. It starred Vijay Maurya and Palomi Ghosh in the lead roles. The story is told through over 20 popular Konkani songs from the 1960s and 1970s that have been re-recorded for this film. The film is set in the 1960s and is a tribute to the 'unsung' Konkani musicians of that era.

The Goa premiere was held at Ravindra Bhavan, Margao. The film was funded with contributions from friends.

== Cast ==
- Vijay Maurya
- Palomi Ghosh
- Meenacshi Martins
- Prince Jacob
- John D'Silva
- Blasco Andrade
- Joseph (Laughing Joe) Fernandes
- Roque Lazarus
- John De Britto Dsouza
- Comedian Nato
- Kenny
- Shirely Coutinho
- Varsha Manikchand Shrivastav
- Vithal Patil
- Micheal Falcao
- Donald Colaco

== Plot ==
In 1964 Lawry, a young Goan trumpet-player who plays in the nightclubs of Bombay, returns to Goa for a wedding. He and his band need a female singer To give themselves some 'glamour'. He meets Dona and invites her to join the band. While Lawry moulds the impressionable young Dona into a talented singer, they appear to fall in love. He insists she return home to study and take exams. But on one return from a short tour, Dona realises he is married. She is devastated. Later their affair resumes, although her parents warn her against Lawry as they know he is married, and they worry about her career of being a singer. On returning from the next short tour, Lawry speaks to her parents outside the train station and says he will come and speak to them about things. They look pleased, but it is unclear what he might be planning. Whatever this is, everything changes when Lawry goes home and finds out his wife is pregnant. He does not go to meet Dona's parents. They wait for hours. She forgives him this and the affair resumes. But when the other musicians sing a celebration song to Lawry she discovers he is to be a father and she is furious and heart-broken. Lawry imagines breaking down a door and finding Dona dead from hanging herself. We see him dress sombrely with a black tie, but instead of going to Dona's funeral he goes to his own baby's naming ceremony. Instead of committing suicide Dona later sings a song about being betrayed and being 'in heaven', whilst crying on stage...

It is now 1967 or later. Dona signs a musician's contract to record a duet with Mohammed Rafi. She says, 'I won't sing with anyone.' But she does sing with Rafi and Lawry stands next to them playing trumpet.

Dona listens to the advice of the local drunk who thinks she will soon join his 'world of madness' as she is so sad. He offers her alcohol to help with her sorrow. After another gig, Lawry says Dona behaves like a tart with the audience. She says he has treated her that way and she will no longer sing with him. Next day, Logic, the band manager, cannot find Dona for rehearsal. They use a new singer, Usha, for a recording. Logic doesn't think this recording has any magic to it. The band needs Dona.

We see Dona singing with another band and looking somewhat unravelled or drunk. Lawry arrives in the audience. He gets on stage, grabs a mic stand and chases Dona off, shouting about her trying to challenge him. We hear a strike and a shriek. Backstage Dona sobs. Lawry calms down, then leaves.

By 1970 both have success separately with their bands in Bombay. Dona's father dies. Lawry has another child. In Goa in 1974 Dona hides a bottle of spirits under a shawl and appears rough. Lawry's wife is pregnant again.

In 1975 Lawry contemplates how the film industry credited the actors rather than the musicians and composers from Goa on many well-known films.

In 1995 we see a man track down Dona and encourage her to return to the stage. The film ends with footage of the real Lorna Cordeiro singing.

2004 shows a tombstone for Lawry. There is a voiceover in English concerning the decline of Goan musicianship over the decades.

Note: The film weaves its lilting narrative through 20 timeless songs based on actual events. Songs are frequently accompanied by flamenco dancers who embody the emotional turmoil of the story-telling. This quasi-biographical film is a tribute to one of Goa’s greatest, yet barely acknowledged legacy - its musicians, who once upon a time set the jazz clubs of Bombay on fire and actually shaped the music of Bollywood cinema. Nachom-ia Kumpasar is a nostalgic musical tale set in the times these musicians lived and died in - unrecognized, unappreciated… and unsung until now.

== Awards ==
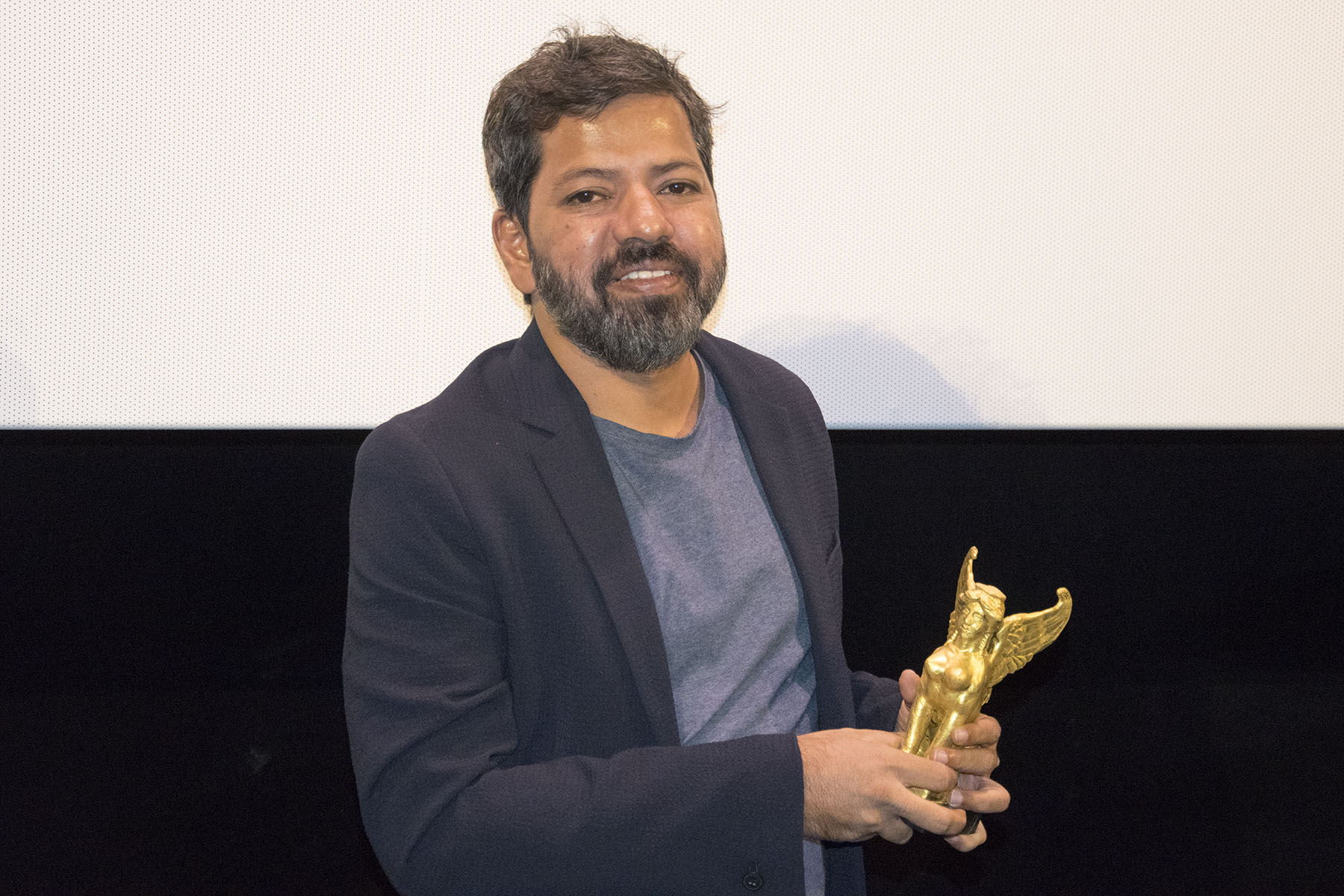
Director Bardroy Barretto receiving his Grand Prix at the Vienna Independent Film Festival

Nachom-ia Kumpasar has won 24 international, 3 national and 10 state awards making it the most awarded Konkani film. At the 62nd National Film Awards, the film won three awards. Bardroy Barretto won the National Film Award for Best Feature Film in Konkani, Aparna Raina won the award for best production design, and actress Palomi Ghosh received National Film Award – Special Jury Award / Special Mention for Female Actor (Feature Film). The film also won Lebara Play Audience Choice Award for best film at London Indian Film Festival 2015 Nachom-ia Kumpasar was also included in the shortlist at the 2016 Oscars for Best Picture and Best Original Score. The film won three awards at VIFF 2016 Vienna Independent Film Festival, Grand Prix for Best of the Festival as well as the Best Music Film Award and Best Art Direction Award.

=== Wins and awards ===
- 62nd National Film Awards, India 2015:
  - Winner- Best Konkani Film
  - Winner- Best Production Design
  - Special Mention for Best Female Performance- Palomi Ghosh
- London Indian Film Festival 2015:
  - Winner- Lebara Play Audience Choice Award
- Brasov International Film Festival (Romania):
  - Winner- Best Film (out of competition)
- Global Music Award (US):
  - Winner- Silver Medal for Best Music and Original Score
- Lombardy International Film Festival (Milan):
  - Winner- Best Director-Foreign Film
  - Winner- Best Sound Design
  - Winner- Best Original Score
- Tiburon International Film Festival (CA, USA):
  - Winner- Golden Reel Award for Best Musical Film
- United International Film Festival (Hollywood, Los Angeles, CA):
  - Winner: Best Music
- 6th Dada Saheb Phalke Film Festival (India):
  - Winner- Best Music
  - Certificate of Excellence- Best Director
  - Certificate of Excellence- Best Editor
  - Certificate of Excellence- Best Screenplay
  - Certificate of Excellence- Best Cinematography
- Near Nazareth Film Festival (Israel):
  - Winner- Best Feature Film
- 2016 Barcelona Film Festival:
  - Winner- El Rey Award For Excellence in Cinematography
- Mexico International Film Awards:
  - Winner- Golden Palm Award for Best Feature of First Time Filmmaker
- Vienna Independent Film Festival:
  - Winner- Grand Prix (Best Of The Festival)
  - Winner- Best Art Direction
  - Winner- Best Musical Film
- Cordoba Film Festival, Colombia
  - Winner- Best Film
- Washington DC South Asian Film Festival, US
  - Winner: Best Actress
- 8th Goa State Film Festival (2014 & 2015):
  - Winner: Best Film- Bardroy Barretto
  - Winner: Best Director- Bardroy Barretto
  - Winner: Best Actor (Jury Award)- Vijay Maurya
  - Winner: Best Actress (Jury Award)- Palomi Ghosh
  - Winner: Best Music- Chris Perry, Ronnie Monsorate, Jacob Pereira
  - Winner: Best Cinematographer- Suhas Gujarathi
  - Winner: Best Editor- Bardroy Barretto
  - Winner: Best Audiography- Alok De
  - Winner: Best Art Direction- Aparna Raina
  - Winner: Best Costume Designer- Sweta Gomes

=== Nominations and shortlists ===
Lombardy International Film Festival (Milan): Nomination: Best Film Nomination: Best Screen Play

Oscar Award Contention List (Academy of Motion Pictures, LA): Shortlist- Best Picture Shortlist- Best Original Score

Rapid Lion (Johannesburg, SA): Nomination- Best Sound Editing Nomination- Best Female Actor

New York Indian Film Festival (NYC, USA): Nomination- Best Film Nomination- Best Female Actor

== See also ==
- Konkani cinema
- Nirmon
