= Connection (film) =

2017 Indian film in Konkani

- Poster
- Directed by: Christ Sunjo Silva
- Written by: Christ Sunjo Silva
- Produced by: Sylvester Fernandes
- Starring: John D'Silva; Prince Jacob
- Cinematography: Patson Barbosa
- Edited by: Patson Barbosa
- Music by: Joel Fernandes; Tyron Noronha
- Production company: JMJ Productions
- Release date: 4 November 2017 (Goa)
- Running time: 155 minutes
- Country: India
- Language: Konkani

Connection is a 2017 Indian film in Konkani, written and directed by Christ Sunjo Silva and produced by Sylvester Fernandes. This is Silva's third feature film, after Limits and Action. The film utilizes a non-linear storytelling technique and flashbacks and is a thriller. It features Prince Jacob in the lead role of Father Mark. The film also features Silva's father, tiatrist John D'Silva.

== Plot ==
Father Mark (Prince Jacob) is a kind priest who is very pious. He also loves books and is an author. One day, a prisoner approaches him to write a biography of his life. It is then revealed that Father Mark has a dark past which haunts him.

== Cast ==
- Prince Jacob as Father Mark
- John D'Silva
- Benhur Silva
- Casiano Eddie D’Souza
- Chitra Afonso
- Benzer Fernandes
- Anirudh Kakule
- Sobita Kudtarkar
- Siddharth Nagoji
- Dencilla Dias
