= William de Curtorim =

Indian singer and director (1952–2011)

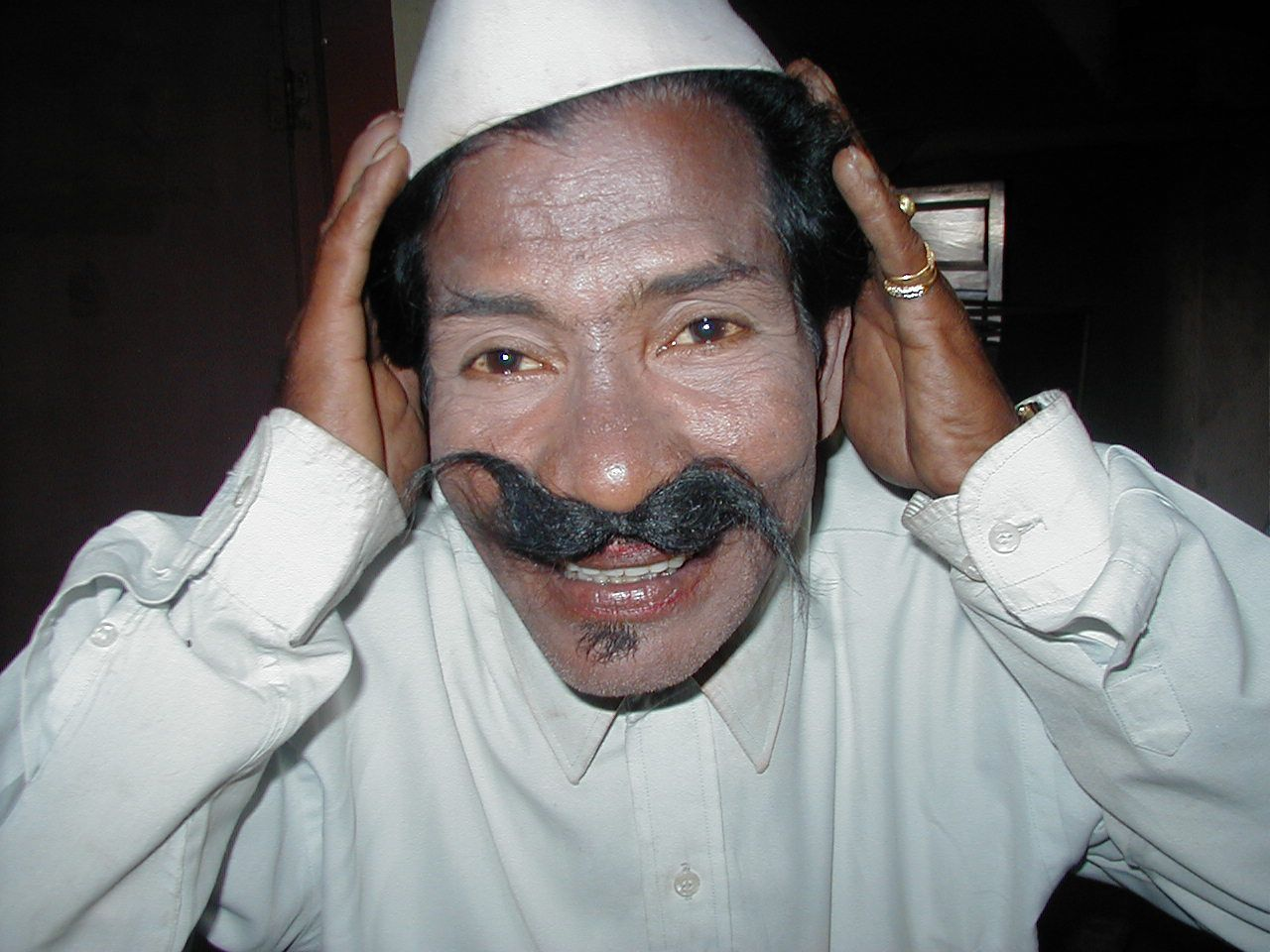
- Menezes during a tiatr production, 2006
- Born: Antonio William Menezes; 15 April 1952; Curtorim, Goa, Portuguese India, Portuguese Empire (now in India)
- Died: 11 December 2011 (aged 59); Curtorim, Goa, India
- Burial place: St. Alex Church cemetery, Curtorim, Goa, India
- Occupations: Singer; composer; playwright; theatre director; lyricist
- Years active: 1980s–2010

Antonio William Menezes (15 April 1952 – 11 December 2011), known professionally as William de Curtorim, was an Indian singer, composer, lyricist, playwright, and theatre director who worked on the Konkani stage.

== Early life ==
Antonio William Menezes was born on 15 April 1952, in the Argicol ward in the village of Curtorim, Goa, which was part of Portuguese India during the Portuguese Empire (now in India). He was born into a Goan Catholic family to Roque Sebastião Assuncao Menezes, hailing from Assolnã, and his homemaker Maria Julia Vas.

Menezes commenced his artistic journey following the completion of his primary education at a local village school. He initially contributed to his brother's welding workshop, while concurrently nurturing his inherent talent for composing and singing songs. Menezes was introduced to the vibrant world of tiatr, a popular form of Goan musical theater, by his brother, Jockey de Curtorim. His debut on the tiatr stage occurred during the performance of his brother's production titled Buddkulo Xizta. Although the song he presented on that occasion deviated from his characteristic high-paced style, it garnered appreciation from the audience, thus marking the beginning of his musical career.

== Career ==
Menezes had performed on various audio cassettes and had also taken on the role of producer for several of his own audio cassettes. He had explored tiatr writing and musical show production as well. Menezes directed tiatrs and performed fast-paced songs, which had earned him the nickname of the "jet speed singer". One aspect of Menezes's career was addressing political issues through his music, particularly in criticizing acts of corruption and other misconduct by politicians. In addition to his audio releases, Menezes ventured into producing a range of audio and video CDs. He achieved acclaim in various theatrical productions for his songs with political themes. Menezes also garnered attention for his solo performances that shed light on the actions of local politicians. However, Menezes's active involvement diminished after April 2010, following a serious road accident that affected his health. His last appearance was in the tiatr production Hem Oxem Kiteak? (Why is it like this?) directed by Lawrence Fernandes.

On 25 September 2009, Menezes participated in the 35th Tiatr 'A' Group Competition 2009–2010, organized by Kala Academy Goa. He was cast in the tiatr production titled Teag, presented by Paingin Kala Krida Saunskrutic Mandal, Chaudi, Canacona, Goa. In an article for The Times of India, Ron Fidelis describes Menezes as being noticeable for his active participation, as he sang one of his songs in a manner similar to Young Menezes, without pausing for breath. Alongside fellow tiatrists such as Tomazinho Cardozo, Irene Cardozo, Wilson Mazarello, and others, Menezes made an impact on the contemporary phase of tiatr, which flourished following Goa's Liberation. The Navhind Times described Menezes as "a very bold and fearless singer who exposed hypocrisy, corruption and nepotism through his political songs which made him a sensation among the masses".

== Personal life ==
Menezes was recorded as residing in the Argicol area of Curtorim, Goa, according to the 2012 Directory of Tiatr Artistes.

=== 2010 road accident ===
On 11 April 2010, Menezes was involved in a serious accident near the Verna bypass. At approximately 6:30 pm, while riding his Hero Honda motorcycle, Menezes collided with a Hyundai Getz car (registered as GA-09-A-1629) at the Verna bypass. The Verna police reported that Menezes sustained multiple injuries as a result of the collision. He was promptly transported to the Goa Medical College (GMC) hospital in a 108 ambulance. The Verna police initiated an investigation and registered the incident as an accident. Menezes condition was described as critical during his treatment at the Goa Medical College hospital. The news of the accident quickly spread, prompting several fellow stage artists to visit the GMC Hospital to inquire about Menezes' condition. It is worth noting that prior to the accident, Menezes had plained to travel to Dubai with Anil-Olga's troupe on 13 April.

== Selected stage works ==
Year	Title	Role	Notes	Ref
	Buddkulo Xizta	Singer	Debut on Konkani stage	
2009	Teag	Singer		
c. 2010	Hem Oxem Kiteak?	Singer	Final production	
