= Sharon Mazarello =

Indian singer and actress (born 1965)

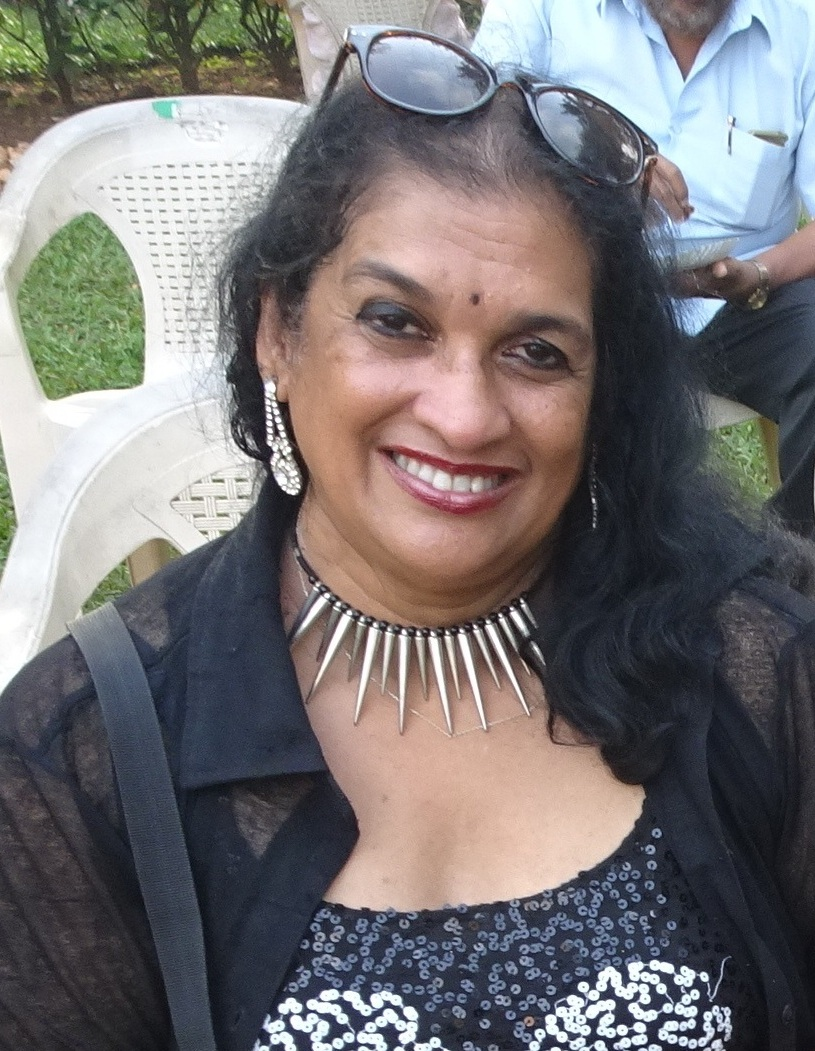
- Mazarello in 2018
- Born: 29 June 1965 (age 61); Margao, Goa, India
- Education: Bombay University (B.A.); Trinity College Of Music
- Occupations: Singer; director; actress; screenwriter
- Years active: 1979–present
- Title: Founder of Theatre Art & Cultural Training Institute, Margao
- Spouse: Wilson Mazarello

Sharon Mazarello (born 29 June 1965) is an Indian singer, actress, director, playwright, and filmmaker known for her work in Konkani films, television, and tiatr productions.

== Education ==
Mazarello holds a Bachelor of Arts in Psychology from Bombay University. She also holds the Grades I, II & III of music from the Trinity College Of Music.

== Career ==
Mazarello debuted in the tiatr Devan Sanddunk Nam in 1979 with a cameo appearance opposite tiatrist Jacinto Vaz. This tiatr was produced by her husband, Wilson Mazarello. In this tiatr, she sang the song Dhovo Parvo, her first solo.

Since then, Mazarello has sung in many tiatrs, musical programmes, movies, and even on radio and television shows. She has also released many albums. The languages she has sung in include Konkani, Marathi, Hindi and English. She has over 27 audio CDs and one Konkani music DVD, Durig (transl. The Compound Wall), to her credit.

Mazarello has acted in more than 150 tiatrs. She has also acted in plays on radio, television and in local videos and films, in both Konkani and English. She has even written and directed many tiatrs and plays and founded the 'Theatre Art & Cultural Training Institute' in Margao for training young theatre artistes.

In 2010, Mazarello wrote, directed, sang and acted in the Konkani film, Tum Kitem Kortolo Aslo?. With this film, Mazarello became the first woman to direct a Konkani movie. She has also made a short film titled Cheddum....The Girl. She has also acted in the Bollywood film Dum Maaro Dum.

In 2018, she released the tiatr, Tukai Tench Assa, a story about old age.

== Select filmography ==
- Tum Kitem Kortolo Aslo? (2010)
- Cheddum....The Girl (short film)
- Dum Maaro Dum (2011) (as actor)
