= List of people from Goa =

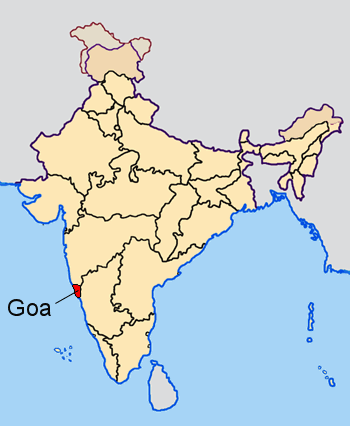
Location of Goa in the India map

This is a list of notable people from Goa, India. This list includes Goans and persons of Goan origin. The names are arranged in alphabetical order in their respective categories.

== Architects ==
- Bruno Dias Souza (1925–2025), Indian architect who was part of a group of architects who aimed to redefine the essence of modern architecture within the context of India.
- Charles Correa (1930–2015), Indian architect and urban planner, recognized for his contributions to modern architecture in post-Independent India.
- Gerard da Cunha, Goan origin, founder and principal architect of the architecture firm Architecture Autonomous. An alumnus of the School of Planning and Architecture, Delhi, he is known for utilizing locally available materials and traditional construction techniques in harmony with its ecosystem
- Sarto Almeida

== Artists ==
- Angelo da Fonseca, noted for presenting Christian themes in an Indian style
- Antonio Piedade da Cruz, twentieth-century painter and sculptor
- António Xavier Trindade, important painter of the Bombay School in the early 20th century
- Carl d'Silva, Indian wildlife artist and naturalist well known for his paintings of birds in many ornithological handbooks and field guides.
- Dinanath Dalal
- Francis Newton Souza (1924–2002), artist
- Frederika Menezes, Goan author, poet and artist. She is best known for her book, Unforgotten (which was a love story for young adults, published in 2014). A poem of hers, The Different Normals, is yet to feature in English textbook of the Goa Board of Secondary & Higher Secondary Education (GBSHSE)
- Lancelot Ribeiro, Goan origin Modern artist
- Laxman Pai, Indian artist and painter. He was a principal of the Goa College of Art, a post he held from 1977 to 1987. Pai was a recipient of several awards, including India's third highest civilian honour of Padma Bhushan, awarded by the Government of India.
- Mario Miranda (1926–2011), famous for his cartoons in The Illustrated Weekly of India; Padma Vibushan awardee
- Prafulla Dahanukar, Indian painter, a leader in modern Indian art who also helped and influenced many young artists in India.
- Subodh Kerkar, Indian painter, sculptor and installation artist, and founder of the private art gallery Museum of Goa. He is known for his artworks and installations
- Sushila Yawalkar, painter, sculptor and dancer
- Vamona Navelcar, painter
- Vasudeo S. Gaitonde (1924–2001), regarded as India's foremost abstract artist; received Padma Shri Award in 1971; born in Nagpur of Goan parents

== Bankers ==
- Aisha de Sequeira, Indian banker and co-head of Morgan Stanley
- Victor Menezes, Goan origin Senior Operating Advisor for New Silk Route

== Businesspersons and Entrepreneurs ==
- Francisco D'Souza, American businessman of Goan origin
- Gracias Saldanha, Goan origin founder of Glenmark Pharmaceuticals
- Ivan Menezes, Goan origin, CEO of Diageo
- Manuel Menezes, business executive and former chairman of the Indian Railway Board
- Roger Faria, merchant
- Tony Fernandes, Malaysian founder of Tune Air, owner of budget airline Air Asia. Father originally from Goa.
- Vasudev Salgaocar, Indian businessman, and the founder and chairman of the V. M. Salgaocar Group of Companies, active mainly in iron ore mining, but also in coal mining and wind energy

== Chief Secretary ==
- Dr. JC Almeida, IAS officer, former Chief Secretary of Goa, and the first Chairman of the Goa Public Service Commission

== Industrialists ==
- Ramnath Kare
- Vasantrao S. Dempo
- Vishwasrao Chowgule

== Engineers ==
- Peter de Noronha, Goan origin, businessman and civil servant of Kanpur, India. He was knighted by Pope Paul VI in 1965 for his work for the Christian community in India.

== Esport players ==
- Jonathan Gaming, Indian professional esports player

== People in Film and Television ==
- Varsha Usgaonkar, Indian film and television actress.
- Rajendra Talak, Indian film director and producer known for Konkani films such as Aleesha and O Maria.
- Milroy Goes, Goan film director, known for the film Welcome Millions which was qualified for the 91st Academy Awards. And the only Goan as Emmy Voting Member at Television Academy in Hollywood. His debut Konkani film “The Victim” was considered first digitally shot film to release in theatres in Goa.
- Waluscha De Sousa, Indian actress and model. She made her debut in the 2016 Hindi film Fan.
- Rameez Shaikh, Goan filmmaker and director known for the short film The Awakening and the awareness advertisement Imagine If It Was You.
- Keith Sequeira, Indian actor and former model.
- Laxmikant Shetgaonkar, Indian film director and screenwriter known for Paltadacho Munis and Baga Beach.
- Ileana D'Cruz, Portuguese actress.
- Prachi Shirodkar, Goan filmmaker and director known for the documentary Bhaangar Kalakusar Karigiri.
- Miransha Naik, Indian film director, producer and screenwriter known for the Konkani film Juze.
- Mario Pimenta, Goan filmmaker and director known for the environmental short film Act To Achieve and he has also created Goa's First AI film Job Needed.
- Saisma Naik, Goan filmmaker and director associated with contemporary independent cinema.
- Christ Silva, Indian filmmaker known for Konkani films including Connection and Crazy Mogi.
- Tapan Acharya, Indian actor, filmmaker, writer, producer and director.
- Frank Fernand, Indian filmmaker and musician known for Amchem Noxib and Nirmon.
- Sharvi Dhond, Goan filmmaker, writer and director associated with independent filmmaking in Goa.
- Al Jerry Braganza, Indian filmmaker, actor and singer who directed and produced Mogacho Aunddo.
- Sharon Mazarello, Indian actress, singer, playwright, director and filmmaker associated with Konkani cinema and tiatr.
- C. Alvares, Indian Konkani actor, singer, playwright and director who was also involved in Konkani cinema.
- Rajdeep Naik, Indian actor, theatre director and producer associated with Konkani films and theatre.

== Governors ==
- Anthony Lancelot Dias, Goan origin, 8th Governor of West Bengal
- Bernardo Peres da Silva, of Neurá; appointed Prefect of Estado da Índia Portuguesa in 1835, the only Goan to hold a post equivalent to a Governor-General
- Rajendra Arlekar, 30th Governor of Bihar and 21st Governor of Himachal Pradesh
- Sunith Francis Rodrigues, 26th Governor of Punjab

== Historians, Indologists and Archeologists ==
- José Pereira, Sanskrit scholar, historian, writer, artist, and linguist from Goa, India
- Damodar Dharmananda Kosambi (1907–1966), historian and mathematician
- José Gerson da Cunha (1844–1900), historian and Orientalist; wrote the first book on history of Bombay, The Origin of Bombay (1900), published by the Bombay branch of the Royal Asiatic Society
- Dharmananda Damodar Kosambi (1876–1947), scholar of Buddhist religion and Pali language
- Percival Noronha, Indian historian and bureaucrat
- Prakashchandra Pandurang Shirodkar, Indian archaeologist and writer
- Rui Gomes Pereira

== Lawyers and Judges ==
- Anuja Prabhudessai, Judge at Bombay High Court
- Eurico da Silva (1933–2025), former Judge at Bombay High Court
- Ferdino Rebello, former Chief Justice of Allahabad High Court
- Fitz de Souza, Goan origin, barrister-at-law and PhD from London; important figure in African politics; participated in Kenya's struggle for freedom
- Kashinath Trimbak Telang, former Judge at Bombay High Court.
- Libia Lobo Sardesai, lawyer and freedom fighter, winner of the Padma Shri in 2025

== Military ==
- General Sunith Francis Rodrigues, former Chief of the Army Staff and former Governor of Punjab
- Air Chief Marshal Hrushikesh Moolgavkar, Goan-origin Chief of the Air Staff from 1 February 1976 to 31 August 1978
- Lieutenant General WAG Pinto, Senior General officer in the Indian Army and the Victor of Basantar
- Lieutenant General Francis Dias, Senior General officer in the Indian Army who was awarded a Vir Chakra
- Vice Admiral John Colin De Silva, former Vice Chief of the Naval Staff and Director General of the Indian Coast Guard
- Air Vice Marshal Erlic Pinto, Goan origin Air officer in the Indian Air Force
- Filipe Nery Xavier, Portuguese military commander
- Manuel António de Sousa, military captain
- Otelo Saraiva de Carvalho, Goan origin Portuguese military officer
- Kuxttoba, rebel leader from the Rane clan of Sattari
- André Pereira dos Reis, commander who lost Muscat in 1680

== Models and Pageants ==
- Anjali Mendes, Goan origin model
- Candice Pinto, Goan origin model and pageant
- Gail Nicole Da Silva, Indian model and beauty pageant title holder of Femina Miss India United Continent 2014
- Joanne Da Cunha, Indian actress, singer and model
- Radha Bartake, Indian actress and model
- Reita Faria, Goan origin former Miss World
- Waluscha De Sousa, Indian actress and model. She made her debut in the 2016 Hindi film Fan.

== Musicians and Singers ==
- Anjanibai Malpekar (1883–1974), Hindustani classical singer of Bhendibazaar gharana, Sangeet Natak Akademi Fellowship (1958).
- António Fortunato de Figueiredo (1903–1981), conductor, violinist; founder-director of the Academia de Música (now Dept of Western Classical Music, Kala Academy); founder-director of the Orquestra Sinfónica de Goa (Goa Symphony Orchestra).
- Anthony Gonsalves (1927–2012), violinist; taught R.D. Burman and Pyarelal Ramprasad Sharma (a member of the Laxmikant Pyarelal team) and worked with most of the legendary composers of the 1950s and 1960s
- Chic Chocolate, trumpeter and music composer.
- Chris Perry, the king of Goan music.
- Colin D'Cruz, jazz producer and bassplayer; runs Jazz Goa
- Datta Naik, Hindi film music director
- Dinanath Mangeshkar, dramatist and classical vocalist
- Esther Eden, pop singer
- Frank Fernand, violinist, trumpeter and music conductor
- Hema Sardesai, playback singer
- Ian D'Sa, UK-born, of Goan descent; guitarist of Canadian rock band Billy Talent.
- Jitendra Abhisheki, Indian musician
- Kesarbai Kerkar (1892–1977)
- Khaprumama Parvatkar (1879–1953), ghumot and tabla player
- Kishori Amonkar, classical vocalist
- Leoncie, singer
- Lorna Cordeiro, Konkani language singer
- Lourdino Barreto, music conductor and composer
- Mogubai Kurdikar, classical vocalist
- Mark Revlon, singer, drummer, and bandleader of The Mark Revlon Band.
- Prabhakar Karekar, Hindustani classical singer
- Prasad Sawkar, singer
- Ramdas Kamat, Sangeet Natak musician
- Remo Fernandes, musician and Bollywood playback singer
- Sebastian D'Souza, music arranger and conductor
- Sonia Sirsat, Fado singer
- Suresh Haldonkar, classical vocalist, actor
- Tsumyoki, Indian rapper, singer, record producer and musician
- Tulsidas Borkar, harmonium player and music composer
- Ajit Kadkade, Devotional singer
- Manoharbua Shirgaonkar, known as "Bhajan Samrat", bhajan singer

== Olympians ==
=== Representing India ===
- Peter Paul Fernandes was part of India's Gold Medal-winning Men's Field Hockey Team at the 1936 Berlin Olympics.
- Walter D'Souza, Lawrie Fernandes, Maxie Vaz, Leo Pinto and Reginald Rodrigues were part of the Gold Medal-winning Men's Field Hockey Team at the 1948 London Olympics.
- Mary D'Souza Sequeira became the First Indian Woman to Qualify for an Olympics at the 1952 Helsinki Olympics competing in the women's 100 and 200 metres race.
- Lavy Pinto reached the semi-final of the men's 100 meters Race at the 1952 Helsinki Olympics, the best ever performance by an Indian till date.
- Neville D'Souza from Assagao scored a Hattrick in the quarter-finals against Australia as the Men's Football Team stood Fourth in the 1956 Melbourne Olympics.
- Fortunato Franco From Colvale was part of the Indian Men's Football team at the 1960 Rome Olympics.
- Anthony Francis Coutinho competes in the men's 4 × 100 metres relay, reaching the semi-final at the 1964 Tokyo Olympics
- Stephie D'Souza competes in the Women's 400 meters Race of the 1964 Tokyo Olympics.
- Edward Sequeira from Arpora competes the Men's 5000 meters Race in the 1972 Munich Olympics
- Dr Vece Paes was Part of the Men's Hockey Bronze Medal-winning team though He did not play a Match at the 1972 Munich Olympics.
- Mervyn Fernandes was part of the Men's Hockey Team which won the gold medal at the 1980 Moscow Olympics. He also was part of the Team at the 1984 Los Angeles and 1988 Seoul Olympics.
- Margaret Toscano, Selma D'Silva, Lorraine Fernandes and Eliza Nelson were Part of the Women's's Field Hockey Team which stood Fourth at the 1980 Moscow Olympics.
- Joaquim Carvalho from Assolna was part of the Men's Field Hockey team at the 1984 Los Angeles Olympics.
- Darryl D'Souza was Part of the Men's Field Hockey team at the 1992 Barcelona Olympics.
- Leander Paes won a bronze medal in the Men's Singles Tennis at the 1996 Atlanta Olympics.

=== Representing other nations ===
- Jack Britto, field hockey, 1952, representing Pakistan
- Seraphino Antao, Athletics, 1960, 1964, representing Kenya
- Dominic John Rebelo, 1996, 2000 Olympian in archery for Kenya.

== Physicians ==
- José Camillo Lisboa, Goan physician and botanist
- José Gerson da Cunha, Goan physician who achieved international renown as an orientalist, historian, linguist and numismatist
- Acacio Gabriel Viegas, medical practitioner who was credited with the discovery of the outbreak of bubonic plague in Bombay, India, in 1896.
- Jaime Valfredo Rangel, Goan doctor, Director of Tipografia Rangel (Rangel Printing Press), President of the Municipal Council of Bardez (Mayor of Bardez) and a delegate to the International Labour Organization for Portugal.
- P. D. Gaitonde, surgeon from Goa and an active participant in the Goa liberation movement. Along with Antonio Colaco, Gaitonde was nominated by the president of India to the 3rd Lok Sabha in 1962, following the incorporation of Goa, Daman and Diu into India on 19 December 1961.
- Alvaro de Loyola Furtado, social worker, historian, journalist, medical practitioner and humanitarian. He was described as a leader among men, a man of great integrity and honour.
- Bhau Daji, Indian physician, Sanskrit scholar, and an antiquarian.
- Francisco Luís Gomes, Goan physician, writer, historian, economist, political scientist and MP in the Portuguese parliament. A classical liberal by political orientation, Gomes represented Portuguese India in the Cortes Gerais (parliament) from 1861 to 1869.
- Rosendo Ribeiro, Goan physician and diplomat.
- António Maria de Bettencourt Rodrigues, doctor, Portuguese diplomat and politician.
- Vithal Nagesh Shirodkar, Indian obstetrician and gynaecologist, hailing from the State of Goa.
- Miguel Caetano Dias, medical doctor best known for his roles as chief of health services in Goa (Estado da Índia Portuguesa) and director of the Medical School of Goa (Escola Médico-Cirúrgica de Goa).
- P S Ramani, Indian neurosurgeon and writer from the state of Goa. He is known for his work in Newcastle and his neuro spinal surgery technique of "PLIF". He is currently the senior neuro spinal surgeon at Lilavati Hospital, Mumbai.
- Vincent Alvares, medical practitioner and chemist of his Majesty John V of Portugal. In 1713, he accompanied the General of the Arraial of Ponda, Antonio do Amaral Sarmento, to Sunda in Kanara.
- M. C. Albuquerque, Indian physician. She was medical superintendent of the Vanivilas Women and Children Hospital in Bangalore, from 1937 to 1948.
- Wilfred de Souza, surgeon and politician from Goa, India. He served as Goa's chief minister on three occasions when he was a member of the Indian National Congress and the Goa Rajiv Congress Party, during his third tenure
- Mortó Dessai, medical analyst of Goan origin who worked in Goa and Portugal
- Tomaz Aquino Messias de Bragança, physicist and Mozambican social scientist

== Politicians ==
- Abbé Faria, priest, member of the Pinto clan key participant in the Conspiracy Of The Pintos; became a famous hypnotist and revolutionary in France
- Alfredo Bruto da Costa, former Minister for Health and Social Welfare of Portugal
- Alfredo Nobre da Costa, former Prime Minister of Portugal
- António Maria de Bettencourt Rodrigues (1854-1933) - Judge and diplomat
- António Costa, President of the European Council and former Prime Minister of Portugal
- Cincinnatus Fabian D'Abreo, Saligao origin, former Councillor of Karachi Municipality and founder of Karachi Goan Association
- Churchill Alemao, first Catholic Chief Minister and the shortest serving Chief Minister of Goa
- Claire Coutinho, Goan origin, Member of Parliament for East Surrey
- Dayanand Bandodkar, first Chief Minister of Goa
- Dayanand Narvekar, youngest speaker in Goan assembly history at (34 years) in 1984
- Digambar Kamat, former Chief Minister
- Eduardo Faleiro, former Minister of State for External Affairs
- Erasmo de Sequeira, head of United Goans Party; former member of the Indian Parliament at New Delhi
- Ernest Soares, Bardez origin, former Junior Lord of the Treasury and former Member of Parliament for Barnstaple
- Fitz Remedios Santana de Souza, Kenyan lawyer and politician
- Francisco Luís Gomes (1829-1869), Member of Português Cortes Gerais for Goa
- Francisco Sardinha, former Chief Minister and current MP of South Goa
- Jack de Sequeira, prominent campaigner for the opinion poll that retained Goa as a separate 'Union territory'
- Jaime Valfredo Rangel, physician and president of the Municipal Council of Bardez, also delegate to the International Labour Organization
- João Leão, former Finance Minister of Portugal
- John F Fernandez, first Rajya Sabha MP
- Jorge Barreto Xavier, Margao born, former Secretary of State of Culture of Portugal
- José Inácio Candido de Loyola (1891-1973), Goan independence activist
- Joseph Murumbi, Guirim born, 2nd Vice President of Kenya and 2nd Minister for Foreign Affairs (Kenya)
- Kalidás Barreto (1932-2020) - Son of Goan intellectual Adeodato Barreto; MP for Castanheira de Pera
- Keith Vaz, Bastora origin, former Member of Parliament for Leicester East
- Laxmikant Parsekar, first incumbent Chief Minister to lose its assembly constituency
- Luís de Menezes Bragança, journalist, writer and anti-colonial activist, member of the Bragança family erstwhile rulers of Chandor
- Luis Proto Barbosa, former Chief Minister
- Luizinho Faleiro, former Chief Minister and the first unopposed MLA
- Manohar Parrikar, former Chief Minister of Goa; former Defense Minister of India
- Narana Coissoró, Portuguese Member of Parliament, Vice-President of the Assembly of the Republic
- Nelson de Souza, former Minister of Planning for Portugal
- Otelo Saraiva de Carvalho, formerly a Portuguese military officer, was the chief strategist of the 1974 Carnation Revolution in Lisbon; was born in Lourenço Marques (now Maputo); Mozambique of some Goan ancestry
- Pandurang Purushottam Shirodkar, first speaker of the Goa Assembly
- Pio Gama Pinto, Kenyan freedom fighters and politician; director of the Pan African Press
- Pramod Sawant, current Chief Minister
- Pratapsingh Raoji Rane, longest serving Chief Minister (15 years and 250 days), longest serving MLA (1972–2022) and oldest speaker in Goan assembly history at (73 years) in 2012
- Ravi Naik, former Chief Minister
- Rita Matias - MP of the Assembly of Republic .
- Rosendo Ribeiro (1871-1951) - former Vice-Consul of Portugal in Nairobi
- Sanyogita Rane, only woman MP
- Shamrao Madkaikar, was a freedom fighter and a leader of Communist Party of India from the Indian state of Goa. Madkaikar established the Gomantakiya Tarun Sangh in 1937 at Margao.
- Shashikala Kakodkar, only woman Chief Minister and the youngest (38) serving Chief Minister
- Shripad Naik, longest serving MP from Goa and the current MP of North Goa
- Suella Braverman, Assagao origin, Member of Parliament for Fareham
- Valerie Vaz, Bastora origin, Member of Parliament for Walsall South
- Sadanand Tanavade, current Rajya Sabha MP
- Wilfred de Souza, oldest (71) serving Chief Minister
- Wolfgang Dourado, former Attorney General and Chief Justice of Zanzibar
- Zaneta Mascarenhas, Goan origin, Member of Parliament for Swan

== Education ==
- Armando Menezes, Head of the Department of English St Xavier's College Bombay; Principal of Karnataka College Dharwad; Under-Secretary Education, Government of Maharashtra
- Rui de Figueiredo, professor of Electrical and Computer Engineering and Mathematics, University of California, Irvine

== Priests, Nuns, Bishops and Religious leaders ==
- Ven. Agnelo de Souza, S.F.X - Roman Catholic priest
- Aleixo das Neves Dias, S.F.X - Bishop of Port Blair
- Angelo Innocent Fernandes - Archbishop of New Delhi
- Aniceto Nazareth - Roman Catholic priest in Bombay
- Anil Joseph Thomas Couto - current Archbishop of Delhi
- Anthony Alwyn Fernandes Barreto - current Bishop of Sindhudurg
- Anthony de Mello - Jesuit priest, psychotherapist and author
- Anthony Theodore Lobo - Bishop of Rawalpindi/Islamabad, Pakistan (Karachi/Goa)
- Antonio Francisco Xavier Alvares - first Metropolitan of Goa and Ceylon of the Malankara Orthodox Syrian Church
- Armando Trindade - Archbishop of Lahore
- Benny Mario Travas - current Archbishop of Karachi
- Blasco Francisco Collaço - first Indian Nuncio
- Bridget Sequeira, F.M.C.K. - founded the Franciscan Missionaries of Christ the King, a missionary religious congregation for women in Karachi, Pakistan.
- Msgr. Chico Monteiro - Goan priest
- Earl K. Fernandes - current Bishop of Columbus
- Evarist Pinto - from Aldona, Archbishop of Karachi, Pakistan
- Ferdinand Joseph Fonseca - Auxiliary Bishop of Bombay
- Filipe Neri Ferrão - from Aldona, current Archbishop of Goa and Daman
- Francisco Xavier da Piedade Rebelo - Auxiliary Bishop of Goa
- Hubert Olympus Mascarenhas - Catholic priest in Bombay
- Ignatius P. Lobo - Bishop of Belgaum
- Ivan Dias, Cardinal Prefect, Congregation for the Evangelization of Peoples, Rome (Mumbai/Goa).
- Jacome Gonsalves, C.O. - Oratorian priest, also known as the "Father of Catholic Literature of Sri Lanka"
- Joseph Cordeiro - first Pakistani Cardinal (Karachi/Goa)
- Joseph Coutts - current Cardinal-priest of Pakistan
- St. Joseph Vaz - C.O. missionary in Sri Lanka (Ceylon); patron of Roman Catholic Archdiocese of Goa and Daman
- Karuna Mary Braganza - Catholic nun and Principal of Sophia College, Bombay
- Lumen Monteiro, C.S.C - current Bishop of Agartala
- Matheus de Castro (c. 1594–1677) - first Indian Bishop of the Catholic Church
- Mathias Fernandes - first native Indian Bishop of Mysore
- Max Rodrigues - Bishop of Hyderabad (Pakistan)
- Moreno de Souza - translated the Bible into Konkani language
- Oswald Gracias - from Carmona, current Cardinal Archbishop of Mumbai
- Raul Nicolau Gonçalves - Archbishop of Goa and Damao
- Robert D'Silva - Pakistani priest for over 50 years
- Romuald D'Souza - Jesuit priest, founder of Xavier Centre of Historical Research and Goa Institute of Management
- Msgr. Sebastião Rodolfo Dalgado- Catholic priest, professor and linguist
- Thomas de Castro - Vicar Apostolic of Canara
- Valerian D'Souza - Bishop of Poona
- Valerian Gracias - first Indian Cardinal and Archbishop (Mumbai/Goa)
- Vasco do Rego, SJ - Jesuit priest, editor of the oldest Konkani periodical
- Zinia Pinto - Catholic nun and principal of St Joseph's Convent School, Karachi

== Scientists and Researchers ==
- Froilano de Mello, Portuguese microbiologist, medical scientist, professor, author and independent MP in the Portuguese parliament
- Raghunath Mashelkar, scientist and head of the Council of Scientific and Industrial Research
- Nishtha Desai, scholar

== Athletes ==
- Antao D'Souza, represented Pakistan cricket team in Tests in the 1950s and early 60s
- Anthony de Mello, first secretary of the Board of Control for Cricket in India
- Bhakti Kulkarni, International Master and Woman Grandmaster in Chess
- Brahmanand Sankhwalkar, former Indian football team captain; one of Goa's best goalkeepers; Arjuna awardee
- Brandon Fernandes, all-time top Indian assister in ISL
- Bruno Coutinho, former Indian football team captain, Arjuna awardee and AIFF Player of the Year, 1996
- Carlos Cordeiro, former president of the United States Soccer Federation
- Climax Lawrence, most capped Goan International footballer and AIFF Player of the Year, 2005
- Dilip Sardesai, former Indian international cricketer. He played Tests for the Indian national team as a batsman, the first Goa-born cricketer to play for India, and was often regarded as one of India's best batsmen against spin, although Indian batsmen have been known to play better against spin
- Eliza Nelson, 1982 Asian Games hockey team
- Fortunato Franco, 1962 Asian Games football team
- Ivana Maria Furtado, Woman International Master in Chess
- Joshuah Vaz, current head coach of Indian national futsal team
- Lavy Pinto, 1951 Asian Games gold medallist in 100m and 200m sprint
- Lawrie Fernandes, 1948 London Olympics hockey team
- Leander Paes, 1996 Atlanta Olympics Tennis singles bronze medallist, 5 gold medals at the Asian Games (1994-2006) and 18 Grand Slam titles.
- Leo Pinto, 1948 London Olympics hockey team
- Leon Luke Mendonca, Grandmaster in Chess
- Liston Colaco, highest scoring Goan in ISL
- Maria Rebello, former Indian women footballer and currently a referee
- Mandar Rao Dessai, record Appearance maker in ISL
- Margaret Toscano, 1982 Asian Games hockey team
- Mary D'Souza Sequeira, 1954 Asian Games 4 × 100 m relay team
- Mauricio Afonso, former Indian football team captain
- Menino Figueiredo, Goa’s 1st International Football Player
- Maxie Vaz, 1948 London Olympics hockey team
- Mervyn Fernandis, 1980 Moscow Olympics hockey team
- Peter Paul Fernandes, 1936 Berlin Olympics hockey team
- Pratesh Shirodkar, record Goan Appearance maker in I-league
- Reginald Rodrigues, 1948 London Olympics hockey team
- Rowllin Borges, AIFF Emerging Player of the Year, 2016
- Selma D'Silva, 1982 Asian Games hockey team
- Seraphino Antao, represented Kenya in sprinting in the Common wealth Games during the 1950s and early 60s; won two gold medals
- Shadab Jakati, spin bowler for Goa and Chennai Super Kings; played a key role to help his team win the IPL
- Swapnil Asnodkar, opening batsman for Goa and Rajasthan Royals; played a key role help his team win the inaugural edition of the Indian Premier League
- Stephie D'Souza, 1954 Asian Games 4 × 100 m relay team
- Victorino Fernandes, leading Goan goalscorer in I-league
- Visitacao Lobo, regarded as being the first Goan to play for the Indian national football team.
- Wallis Mathias, represented Pakistan cricket team in 1955
- Walter de Sousa, 1948 London Olympics hockey team
- Yeshwant Barde, cricket umpire at the Ranji Trophy and IPL

== Tiatrists ==
- Alfred Rose (singer), one of the most popular singers and composers of Konkani songs (of the cantaram category), and is routinely broadcast on the Panaji or Panjim station of All India Radio (Akashvani).
- C. Alvares, Indian actor, playwright, singer, producer and director from Saligao, Goa.
- Comedian Selvy, (1974–2022) playwright, singer, director and producer from Goa. Regarded as one of the greatest Konkani comedians of his generation.
- Edmer Barreto, Indian writer, director, and actor who primarily works on the Konkani stage.
- Hortencio Pereira, is a Konkani stage actor from Goa, India. He is a lyricist, writer, actor, comedian, and singer.
- John D'Silva, is an Indian Konkani actor, playwright and director. D'Silva is the first tiatrist to enter the Limca Book of Records in 2010 for acting, writing, directing and producing 25 tiatrs having a double alphabet in their titles.
- M. Boyer, is a writer, director and producer from Goa. He has produced over 35 plays, participated in more than 5000 performances, composing and singing over 1000 songs.
- Kamlakant Chari, Indian scenic designer known for his work on the Konkani stage.
- Maestro Josinho (1941–2017), Indian saxophonist and playwright
- Manuel D'Lima (1934–2016), Indian playwright and theatre director known for his religious plays staged during Lent.
- Mario Menezes (1960–2022), Indian actor, director, writer and prominent tiatrist. He primarily worked on the Konkani stage and was the vice president of Tiatr Academy Goa.
- Nevel Gracias (1964–2022), Indian actor, singer, composer, director, playwright, editor and diocesan priest from Goa. He predominantly worked on the Konkani stage and is best known for his lenten tiatrs.
- Pascoal de Chicalim, playwright and theatre director known for his tiatr productions like Devchaar (Devil).
- Prince Jacob, popular tiatrist and singer from Goa, India. He is "the most Famous man in Konkani Comedy".
- Roseferns, Indian actor and director who is a Konkani tiatrist. He popularly goes under the sobriquet King of centuries.
- Roy de Chinchinim, Indian playwright, theatre director, and actor.
- Sharon Mazarello, tiatrist, singer, scriptwriter, director and actor, hailing from the coastal state of Goa, India.
- Sylvester Vaz, contemporary worship music singer, and former tiatrist.
- Tomazinho Cardozo, dramatist, playwright, writer (in Konkani and English), educationist and politician from Goa.

== Writers, Editors and Journalists ==
- Armand de Souza (1877–1922), founding editor of the Morning Leader in Ceylon; early freedom fighter; jailed by the British colonial government for advocating democracy, but was released following public protests; author of Hundred days in Ceylon under martial law in 1915; father of Senator Doric de Souza (Professor of English) and the late editor of the Times of Ceylon, Tory de Souza
- Damodar Mauzo, Jnanpith Award-winning Konkani writer, Novelist, Critic and script writer
- B. D. Satoskar, author, ex-editor of Gomantak daily.
- Chandrakant Keni, retired editor of Marathi daily Rashtramat and Konkani daily Sunaparant; former freelance journalist; was associated with the development of Konkani language; won Sahitya Academy Award for his book Ashadh Pawali
- Dom Moraes (1938–2004), won the American Press Club Citation for Excellence in Reporting, for some 20 articles he wrote for the New York Times Sunday Magazine; poet.
- Francisco Luís Gomes (1829–1869), Portuguese physician, politician, writer, historian, and economist.
- Frank Simoes, Goan advertising executive; author of Glad Season in Goa.
- Frank Moraes, editor of prominent newspapers in post-independence India, including The Indian Express
- Frederick Noronha, active in cyberspace and involved with e-ventures involving Goa, developmental concerns and free software.
- Frederika Menezes, Goan author, poet and artist. She is best known for her book, Unforgotten (which was a love story for young adults, published in 2014). A poem of hers, The Different Normals, is yet to feature in English textbook of the Goa Board of Secondary & Higher Secondary Education (GBSHSE)
- Ian Fyfe (d. 2005), cricketer, coach and a sports journalist from Karachi, Pakistan.
- Ivo de Figueiredo (born 1966), Norwegian historian, biographer and critic of Goan origin
- J. Clement Vaz (1915–unknown) author of Profiles of Eminent Goans, Past and Present
- JoeGoaUk, pseudonymous Goa-based correspondent, photographer, photojournalist, and online activist
- Lambert Mascarenhas, author of the novel Sorrowing Lies My Land (1955); editor of the Goan Tribune; founder editor of Goa Today, former editor of The Navhind Times; won the State Cultural award.
- Leopoldo da Gama, Goan journalist and founder of the weekly Portuguese newspaper "A Convicção".
- Manohar Rai Sardesai, Konkani and French novelist and poet.
- Maria Aurora Couto, writer, academic and literary critic with books including Graham Greene: On the Frontier, Politics and Religion in the Novels, and Goa: A Daughter's Story.
- Olivinho Gomes (St Estevam, Goa, 1943—30 July 2009), eminent Konkani scholar and former acting vice chancellor of the Goa.
- Orlando da Costa (1929–2006), Communist Portuguese poet and writer of Goan descent, born in the capital of the former Portuguese colony of Mozambique, Maputo.
- Orlando Gomes (1925–2003), theatre critic and writer known for his previews, reviews and free advertisements for Konkani tiatrs.
- Phondushastri Karande (1864–1946), a reformist writer
- Ravindra Kelekar (born 1925), freedom fighter, writer and revivalist of the Konkani language.
- Sebastião Rodolfo Dalgado (1855–1922), from Assagão, linguist; knew Malayalam, Sinhala, Bengali, Kannada, Marathi, and Sanskrit; in 1892, he produced a Konkani-Portuguese dictionary and later a grammar
- Teotonio R. de Souza, historian, founder-director of Xavier Centre of Historical Research, Goa (1979–1994); Fellow of the Portuguese Academy of History; author of publications on Goan history and culture.
- Prashanti Talpankar
- Sandesh Prabhudesai
- Hema Naik
- Pundalik Naik
- Isabel de Santa Rita Vás
- Jessica Faleiro
- Savia Viegas
- Hirabai Pednekar, regarded as the first female Marathi language playwright
- Vinayak Sadashiv Sukhthankar

== Activists ==
- Neola Pereira, Indian environmentalist who is known for her participation in the Save Mollem campaign
- Nilesh Naik (1970–1995), Goan environmental activist and farmworker; Goa's first environmental martyr
- Floriano Vaz (1963–1986), Indian writer and activist from Goa. First martyr of the scheduled tribe community who fought for the official status of the Konkani language during the Konkani language agitation.
- Dadu Mandrekar (c. 1957–2020), Dalit rights activist

== Radio personalites ==
- RJ Joed Almeida, Indian radio personality known for hosting The Drive with Joed on Indigo 91.9 FM.

== Criminals ==
- Zenito Cardozo, Indian gangster and leader of Bang Bang gang.
- Mahanand Naik, serial killer known as the "Dupatta killer"
