= Madkaikar =

Madkaikar is a surname. Notable people with the surname include:

- Pandurang Madkaikar (born 1964), Indian politician
- Parag Madkaikar (born 1986), Indian cricketer
- Shamrao Madkaikar (1910–2011), Indian activist
