= Vellinga =

Vellinga is a surname, also spelled as Vellenga.

== People ==
Notable people with the surname include:

- Dorothy Vellenga (1937–1984), American sociologist
- Kathleen Vellenga (born 1938), American politician and writer
- Marieke Vellinga-Beemsterboer (born 1986), Dutch politician
- Matthijs Vellenga (born 1977), Dutch rower
- Pier Vellinga (born 1950), Dutch scientist
- Renske Vellinga (1974–1994), Dutch speed skater
- Sean Vellenga (born 1961), an American professional wrestler under then name Sean Royal

== Places ==
- Vellinge, a municipality and an airport in Sweden
- Velinga (Veling), a village in Goa, India
- Vallangi, a village in Kerala, India
