= Hema Naik =

Indian writer

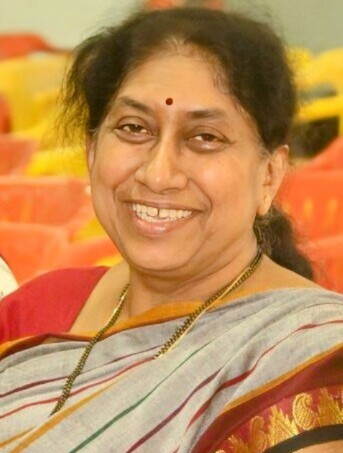
- Hema Naik in 2018
- Born: Hema Dhumatkar
- Occupations: Writer; publisher
- Spouse: Pundalik Naik
- Writing career
- Notable works: Bhogdandd; Durgavatar
- Notable awards: Sahitya Akademi Award (2002); Sahitya Akademi Translation Prize (2013)
- Movement: Konkani language agitation

Hema Naik (née Dhumatkar) is an Indian Konkani writer. She is a recipient of the Sahitya Akademi Award and the Sahitya Akademi Translation Prize and is the wife of the Konkani writer Pundalik Naik. She publishes books under the banner of Volvoi-based Apurbai Prakashan.

== Early life ==
Born as Hema Dhumatkar, she is an Economics graduate who began writing when she was a student activist. She attended the World Women Conference at Kolkata in 1973, which led her to begin writing about women in society in Konkani.

== Career ==
Naik worked in a bank for more than 20 years before quitting to be part of the Konkani literature and activism.

Through her early writings, Hema Naik attacked society's prevalent feudalism and male chauvinism, covering the aspect of women in society in Konkani literature. She began a series of conferences aimed at young female writers called "Chitrangi Melave" to integrate the various feminist ideals in Konkani literature. She was part of the Konkani language agitation and the agitation for Goa's statehood in 1985. She has published more than 100 books and journals in Konkani under her publication house, Apurbai Prakashan.

Over the years, Naik has been a writer, activist, writer, translator, publisher and producer. Her works have explored the different types of people and their behaviour, talking about class and caste. In her work, Nirbala, the protagonist Sapana simply witnesses the cruelty of life around her as an unresisting sufferer and does nothing about it. In another short story, Nimane Sanskar, the protagonist Pranita breaks away from the traditional customs and lights the funeral pyre of her dead father. In Durgavatar, another short story, an uneducated lady kills her husband after facing domestic violence and abuses on a daily basis. Her work, Bhagdandd explores the psyche that concerns the material pleasures of the world, in an attempt to find a way out from the usual and non-challenging world.

Naik was part of the Indian writers protest against government silence on violence in 2015. In response to the rise of cases of abuse of women in the country in 2012–2013, she serially published a novel, Log Out in Dainik Herald. In 2016 she wrote the Konkani novel Aprup Odh. In 2017, she had an FIR lodged against her for publishing Vishnu Wagh's book Sudhir Sukta, which became a subject of debate for its objectionable content on castes and women.

== Works ==
=== Translations ===
- Taath Kana by P. S. Ramani (autobiography) into Konkani
- Autobiography of Bhalchandra Mungekar into Konkani
- Autobiography of Narendra Jadhav into Konkani
- Kali Katha: Via Bypass by Alka Saraogi into Konkani
- Goa: The Daughter's Story by Maria Aurora Couto into Konkani

=== Short stories ===
- Nirbala
- Nimane Sanskar
- Durgavatar

=== Novels ===
- Aprup Odh (2016)
- Log Out
- Bhogadandd

== Awards and accolades ==
Naik was awarded the Sahitya Akademi Award in Konkani in 2002 for her Konkani novel Bhogdandd. She was awarded the 2013 Sahitya Akademi Translation Prize for her translation of the Hindi novel Kali Katha: Via Bypass by Alka Saraogi into Konkani. She has also won the TMA Pai Foundation Manipal's Best Book Award for Bhogdandd. Her work features in the third volume of Knit India Through Literature by researcher-writer Sivasankari and in Hot is the Moon, a collection of stories and poems written by women in India and edited by Arundhathi Subramaniam. Her work in publishing the magazine Chitrangi was recognised with the Katha Journal award by the Federation of India Publishers, New Delhi.
