= Orlando Gomes =

Indian theatre critic and writer (1925–2003)

- Gomes in his later years
- Born: Orlando Jeremias Gomes; 17 January 1925; Bombay, British India
- Died: 5 August 2003 (aged 78); Chira Bazaar, Mumbai, India
- Other names: Orlando J. Gomes
- Citizenship: British Raj (until 1947; India (from 1947)
- Occupations: Theatre critic; writer
- Employer: The Times of India

Orlando Jeremias Gomes (17 January 1925 – 5 August 2003), was an Indian theatre critic and writer known for his work on the Konkani stage. While employed by The Times of India, he contributed to English and Konkani language publications such as Evening News, The Goa Times, Gulab, and The Goan Review. His contributions included previews, reviews, and free advertisements of Konkani tiatrs.

== Early life ==
Orlando Jeremias Gomes was born on 17 January 1925 in his ancestral Gomes building, Vijaywadi (formerly Dukhorwadi), Chira Bazaar, Bombay, which was part of Bombay Presidency during British India (now Mumbai, Maharashtra, India), into a Goan Catholic family. Gomes' ancestral roots can be traced back to Gomes Vaddo in Majorda, Salcete, Goa, then part of Portuguese India during the Portuguese Empire (now located in India). His father, Joao Francisco Gomes, hailed from the village of Majorda, whereas his mother, Maria Paula Estifania Rodrigues, hailed from the coastal village of Anjuna, Goa.

Despite his birth in Bombay, Gomes' birth was later registered in his parents' home state of Goa in 1949. From an early age, Gomes developed a deep appreciation for tiatrs, a form of Goan musical theater. He had a clear recollection of the well-known tiatrists from previous times and their commitment to the Konkani theater. Gomes pursued his education in Bombay, completing both his schooling and graduation there.

== Career ==
Gomes embarked on his professional journey in the advertising department of The Times of India publications subsequent to his education in Bombay. Ascending the ranks, he eventually assumed the position of senior advertisement officer before retiring. Gomes harbored an affinity for tiatr, a form of Goan musical theater, and undertook a significant role in its propagation within Bombay. Through his critical assessments and advance coverage of tiatrs in The Times of India and Evening News, he introduced the art form to a broader audience, extending beyond the Goan community. During the zenith of the tiatr movement, spanning from the late 1970s to the late 1980s, Gomes made substantial contributions to the advancement and popularity of Konkani tiatrs in Bombay. He upheld an inclusive stance, supporting both commercial and non-commercial tiatrs, as well as related forms like khell-tiatrs and non-stop shows. Gomes exhibited impartiality, refraining from discriminating between various genres. In his assessment of Goan art, he showed a positive interest while maintaining an impartial stance, pointing out the strengths and weaknesses of tiatrs and khell-tiatrs in a manner that appealed to a broad range of viewers. Leveraging his position as a member of the staff of the English daily in India, The Times of India, Gomes strategically used his influence to bolster the Konkani tiatr scene.

Gomes played a pivotal role in the establishment of the Man of the Year award, an annual accolade presented to the outstanding tiatr performance held in Bombay for a period of time. This recognition was made possible through the collaborative efforts of influential figures such as Murli Deora, the former Mayor of Bombay and ex-Congress MP, and Nolasco da Gama, a former Goan corporator in Bombay. Gomes, in addition to his involvement with tiatr, made contributions as a writer, regularly contributing articles on tiatrs and various other Goan subjects of interest to Konkani publications including The Goa Times, Gulab, and The Goan Review. Beyond Gomes, there existed a cadre of journalists who undertook the regular review of tiatrs. Among these individuals were those who not only reviewed the scripted and directed performances but also displayed their acting prowess. Their multifaceted involvement played a significant role in the advancement of tiatr. Among these influential figures were Dr. Simon C. Fernandes, Evagrio Jeorge, Elliot de Elly, Anthony Fernandes, Zito Almeida, Ervell Menezes, Alfred D'Cruz, John Gomes (Kokoy), and Fr. Lactancio Almeida SFX, among others. The contributions of these artists to the evolution of tiatr have been documented in the 125th Tiatr Commemorative Volume book. Writer Wilson Mazarello aptly acknowledged Gomes' dedication to the Konkani tiatr in his capacity as a journalist for the English newspaper, The Times of India, stating that his contributions surpassed those of any other individual during that time.

Gomes played a significant role in bolstering the presence and reputation of tiatrs in Bombay's theatrical landscape. His contributions were inclusive and impartial, extending support to both established and aspiring actors, as well as to tiatrists and khell-tiatrists alike. Gomes' assiduity to the Konkani stage was evident through his proactive efforts, such as organizing previews, securing free advertisements, and generating favorable reviews for these performances. His influence transcended regional boundaries, as his previews and reviews served as a gateway for non-Goans to discover and appreciate the Konkani tiatr. In his writings, Gomes exhibited a marked positive inclination towards this form of theater, ensuring that his previews were filled with enthusiasm and his reviews offered constructive criticism. His goal was to highlight the tiatr's strengths while providing suggestions to address any shortcomings, all delivered in a manner that was respectful and non-detrimental. Author Wilson Mazarello aptly noted Gomes' affection for the Konkani tiatr, emphasizing that his previews and reviews consistently reflected this sentiment. As of 1995, despite retiring from The Times of India, Gomes continued to support his cause by collaborating with the media to offer insights and critiques for every tiatr performance in Bombay.

== Personal life ==
Gomes was an advocate and enthusiast of the Konkani tiatr, a theatrical art form. He displayed an ardor for the genre and actively contributed to its development and welfare. Gomes willingly extended his support and guidance to aspiring tiatrists, offering them insights into the ethical aspects of pursuing a successful stage career. Gomes was also an admirer of several tiatrists, who were performers in the Goan traditional theatre form known as tiatr. In 1995, Gomes resided with his family in Vijaywadi, situated off Girgaum Road in Bombay. On 5 August 2003, Gomes died at the age of 78 in his ancestral Gomes building located in Chira Bazaar, Mumbai.
