= Sakharam Barve =

Indian musician and playwright (1899–1972)

Sakharam Pandurang Barve
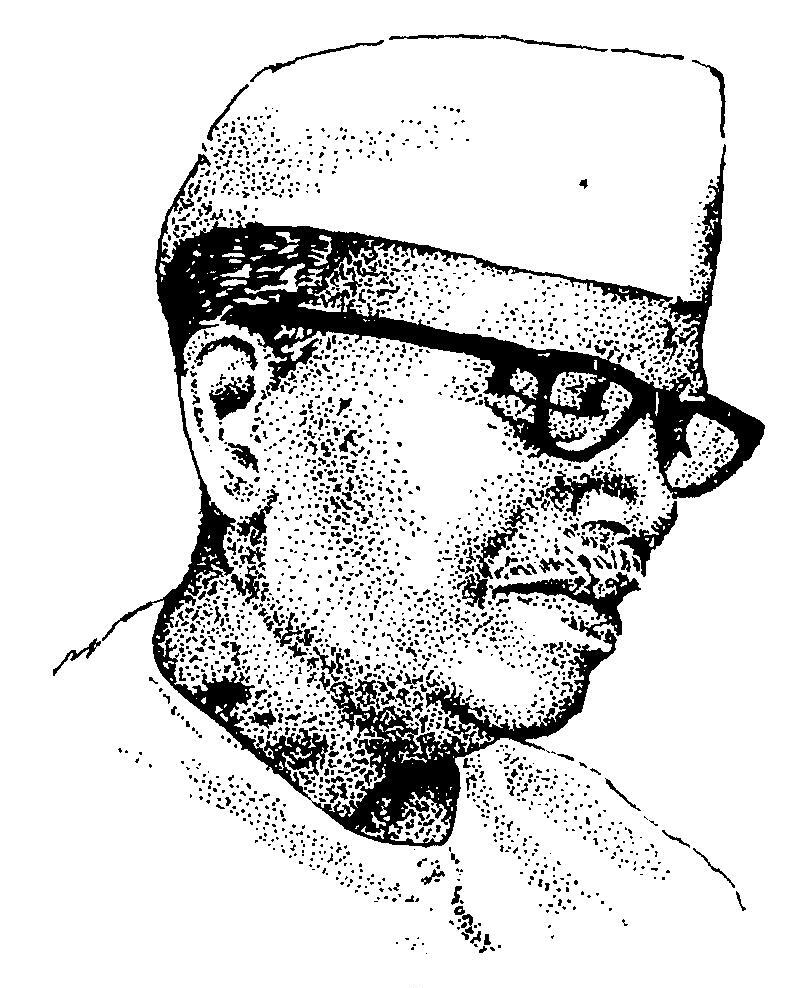
- Born: 1899; Velguem, Surla, Portuguese Goa
- Died: 30 May 1972 (aged 72–73)
- Occupations: Artist, playwright, harmonium player, independence activist
- Movement: Goan independence movement
- Musical career
- Instrument: Harmonium

Sakharam Pandurang Barve (1899 – 30 May 1972) was an Indian artist, playwright, harmonium player, and independence activist. He was active in musical theatre in Goa and Maharashtra and utilized theatre to support the Goan independence movement.

== Early life ==
Sakharam Pandurang Barve was born in 1899 in Velguem, Surla. His father, Pandurang Barve, served as a priest at the local Shri Siddheshwar Temple. Barve was interested in drama and in learning the harmonium since his childhood. He then ran away from his home at the age of eight to his maternal uncle's residence in Bandora to learn to play the harmonium.

In Bandora, he was introduced to the classical vocalist Gayanacharya Vazebuwa. Barve expressed his willingness to travel outside Goa to advance his musical skills. Recognizing the young boy's determination, Vazebuwa took him to Poona and put him in the theatrical troupe managed by Rambhau Kundgolkar, famously known as Sawai Gandharva.

== Career in music and theater ==
While working in the theatrical company, Barve initially performed roles as a child dancer before gaining recognition as the resident harmonium player for the 'Nutan Sangeet Mandali'. After some years, he returned to Goa to establish his own independent drama company. However, the venture closed down within a few years. Following the demise of the noted theater personality Keshavrao Bhosale, Bapusahib Pendharkar and Nanasaheb Chapekar assumed control of the 'Lalit Kaladarsh' Sangeet Mandali. Barve joined this troupe as a harmonium player, though the company's activities eventually slowed down when it shifted focus toward the filmmaking industry.

Barve once again returned to Goa. With the assistance of theater enthusiasts Jagannath Phadte and Savlaram Tari from Volvoi, he established the 'Lalitprabha Sangeet Natak Mandali'. He assembled a troupe of prominent stage artists, including Master Dattaram, Manoharbua Shirgaonkar, Raghuvir Namshikar, and Bukimam Bandodkar, to present high-quality musical dramas. For this company, Barve wrote and staged Sangeet Pranayi Keetak, a play written to protest against the prostitution trade. This production is recognized as the first regional drama staged in Goan theater. To ensure the play connected deeply with ordinary Goans across regions with distinct variations in the Konkani language, Barve structurally incorporated individual characters representing the talukas of Tiswadi, Bardez, Antruz, and Pernem.

Later, Barve collaborated with Vasudeorao Sirsat to establish an institution named 'Natya Vikas', organizing theatrical performances across both Goa and Maharashtra. He thus became known as an accomplished harmonium player across both regions.

== Literary contributions ==
Barve wrote several books and dramas focusing on music theory and mythology:

- Instructional books: He wrote Sangeet Sadhan and Sangeet Darshan, which serve as guidebooks for students learning music theory.
- Plays: He wrote mythological dramas such as Yogasansar and Punarjanma. His biographical plays titled Sant Tukaram and Nandkishor remained unpublished during his lifetime.
- Memoirs: Barve wrote a series of articles detailing his theatrical experiences titled Mazhya Natyasmriti (My Theater Memories) in the daily newspaper Gomantak. His son, Ramesh Barve, later compiled these articles into a book, which was published by the Gomantak Marathi Academy in 1992.

== Goan independence movement ==
During the colonial era, rumours reached the Portuguese authorities that Barve was using his traditional kirtan performances to propagate the policies of the Indian government. Consequently, an official named Agent Monteiro issued a warrant for his arrest. To evade detention, Barve fled Goa and resided in Sawantwadi until the region achieved independence.

During his period of exile in Sawantwadi, he authored a political play titled Jalta Gomantak for the underground nationalist organization Azad Gomantak Dal. The play delivered harsh criticisms against the ruling colonial administration and served as an effective propaganda medium for the Goan independence movement. The drama saw numerous stagings across the Konkan coastal tract and in Bombay, with Barve actively performing on stage in the production himself.

== Accolades ==
In 1990, the Government of Goa posthumously honoured Barve for his contributions as a freedom fighter. The official felicitation took place at Azad Maidan in Panaji on the occasion of Goa Revolution Day.
