= RJ Joed Almeida =

Indian radio personality

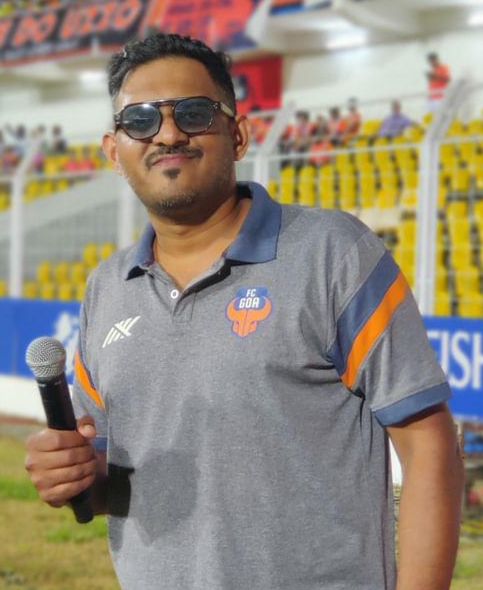
- Almeida at Fatorda Stadium in 2024
- Born: Joed Almeida; 12 September; Salcete, Goa, India
- Occupations: Radio jockey; emcee
- Title: Co-founder of The Music Mafia (TMM)
- Presenting career
- Show: The Drive with Joed
- Station: Indigo 91.9 FM
- Time slot: 5:00 p.m; Monday-Friday
- Country: India
- Website: facebook.com/joed.almeida.50

Joed Almeida, known professionally as RJ Joed Almeida, is an Indian radio personality, emcee, and former banker who hosts The Drive with Joed on the Indigo 91.9 FM.

== Career ==
Almeida made the decision to leave his banking career behind and pursue a new path as a radio jockey for Indigo 91.9 FM. Despite facing initial setbacks, including two unsuccessful attempts, Almeida persevered during a six-month internship and eventually secured the position of a radio jockey. This career shift brought him joy as he found fulfillment in connecting with the younger generation.

In October 2013, Almeida served as the compere for an event initiated by Team Goa for a Cause. This collective comprised Zumba fitness instructors from Goa who united with the objective of encouraging individuals to engage in dance as a means to promote fitness and support charitable causes. The event specifically aimed to generate funds for the Uttarakhand flood victims and raise awareness about breast cancer.

On 23 August 2015, Almeida assumed the role of co-host for the Sol de Gao live music performance festival held in Nerul. The festival, which featured personalities such as former Miss India World Natasha Suri, RJ Ayesha Barretto, Newton D'Souza, and Sandra da Cunha, provided a platform for live musical performances.

On 27 August 2015, Almeida took on the responsibility of hosting the WWF-India's Wild Wisdom Quiz at the Goa Science Centre. The quiz, organized in accordance with the theme "International Year of the Soil" as declared by the United Nations.

In September 2015, a collaborative effort was initiated by Almeida and musician Varun Carvalho, known as 'Turn the Tide', with the aim of raising awareness among children about the importance of conserving water bodies and safeguarding Goa from potential encroachment. Almeida, together with Carvalho, Elvis Lobo, and Mukesh Ghatwal, organized a special program at The King's School in Margao, located in South Goa, to promote their cause.

On 9 April 2016, an annual cultural event known as the World Konkani Day-Il took place at the Ravindra Bhavan in Margao. This event was organized by Almeida and Stanley Marchon, who are both members of The Music Mafia, an organization established by Almeida, Sidharth Yaji, and his school friend Marchon.

In April 2017, Almeida along with The Music Mafia and Ravindra Bhavan, Margao hosted the third edition of World Konkani Day (WKD). This annual event aimed to celebrate and honor the Konkani culture, with a particular focus on engaging the youth and preserving the Konkani heritage. The festival attracted an audience of over 2,500 individuals each year, largely composed of young people who actively participate in the WKD festivities. Almeida emphasized the integral role of youth in the event and acknowledged their contribution to the success of WKD.

In September 2023, All India Radio-Panaji devised a comprehensive programming schedule for the introduction of Akashvani-Panaji, a newly merged FM channel slated to replace the existing FM Rainbow brand commencing from 1 October. The impending transition evoked a sense of dismay among both the radio hosts and the loyal listeners. Almeida, who had grown up avidly tuning in to FM Rainbow, voiced his apprehension regarding the programming changes, expressing concern that the distinctive essence of this iconic channel would be compromised. He emphasized the need for proactive measures to address this issue.

== Personal life ==
Joed Almeida was born on 12 September. He hails from Salcete in South Goa.

Almeida expressed admiration for Kaoma's popular song "Lambada," considering it a highly anticipated and nostalgic experience. He believes it would be a significant event for music enthusiasts and encourages them not to miss it. Additionally, Almeida is a fan of Tina Turner, whom he describes as an extraordinary figure with an immense presence, exemplifying true stardom. Speaking to O Heraldo, Almeida discussed fellow Goan players Bryce Miranda and Princeton Rebello as potential replacements for Sunil Chettri in the national squad. He emphasized the importance of giving young talents adequate time and opportunities within the national team to make a lasting impact, asserting that their progress and contributions will develop over time as they gain more experience on the field.

=== Religious beliefs ===
Prior to going on air, Almeida silently prays. He gauges his listenership by the requests and interactions he receives through various social media platforms. Almeida curates his playlists to include a blend of contemporary music and beloved classics.

== Filmography ==
=== Music videos ===
Year	Song	Artist	Ref
2023	"Golden Peace"	The Pilar Music Academy	
