= Dadu Mandrekar =

Indian writer (c. 1957–2020)

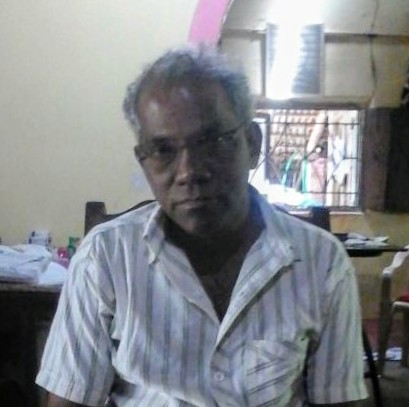
- Mandrekar in 2015
- Born: c. 1957; Mandrem, Goa, India
- Died: 26 November 2020 (aged 63)
- Occupations: Activist, writer, poet, photographer
- Notable work: Bahishkrut Gomantak (1997)
- Movement: Dalit rights, Ambedkarite movement, Tibetan independence movement
- Awards: Goa Marathi Academy Literary Award

Dadu Mandrekar (c. 1957 – 26 November 2020) was an Indian Dalit rights activist, writer, poet, and photographer from Goa. He was prominent in the Ambedkarite movement in Goa and is noted for his literary works documenting the caste-based discrimination prevalent in Goan society. Mandrekar was also a staunch supporter of the Tibetan independence movement.

== Life and activism ==
Dadu Mandrekar was born in Mandrem, Goa. During his education at Mandre High School, he was influenced by the biography of B. R. Ambedkar and the Marathi novel Amrutvel by V. S. Khandekar. He initially worked in the government sector but resigned to dedicate himself to full-time social work. He lived in Mandrem and later in Panaji.

=== Dalit rights and social work ===
Mandrekar's activism focused on the eradication of caste-based discrimination and untouchability. He encouraged Dalit youth to abandon traditional caste-associated occupations, such as playing drums at temples and bamboo craftsmanship. He co-founded the Social Justice Action Committee-Goa to address issues faced by marginalized communities.

He spent years documenting the conditions of Dalit colonies (vastis) and the lives of the destitute in Goa, often traveling by autorickshaw to map these areas. He embraced Buddhism and worked to propagate its teachings alongside modern education within the Dalit community. He was also associated with the "green brigade" as an environmentalist.

=== Support for Tibet ===
Mandrekar was an ardent supporter of the Tibetan cause. He authored books on Tibet in the Marathi language and organized various events and photo campaigns in Goa to raise awareness about the region's issues.

== Literary works ==
Mandrekar was a prolific writer in Marathi and Konkani, known for his "raw and angry" yet composed style that balanced the "horror and humour" of caste realities. He edited the annual magazine Prajasattak, which published articles in Marathi, Hindi, and English on constitutional principles.

=== Books ===
- Bahishkrut Gomantak (1997): A collection of articles and essays documenting caste violence and discrimination in Goa. The book challenges the idyllic image of Goa by highlighting the "parallel geography" of poverty and humiliation faced by lower castes. It details specific rituals, such as the exhumation of graves during the Shigmo festival in villages like Amone and Sal, where bones were paraded before deities. It also discusses discriminatory practices against the Mahar community and the specific stigmatization of women. In 2025, an English translation of the book titled Untouchable Goa, translated by Nikhil Baisane, was published by Panther's Paw Publication.
- Shapit Surya (Cursed Sun): A collection of poems.
- Satyacha Shodh: A study on the Buddha.

== Awards and recognition ==
Mandrekar received several awards for his contributions to literature and social work:

- Goa Marathi Academy Literary Award for his poetry collection Shapit Surya.
- Mahatma Phule and Dr. Babasaheb Ambedkar Vichar Pracharak Sanstha Literary Award for Bahishkrut Gomantak.

== Death ==
Mandrekar died on 26 November 2020, at the age of 63, following a brief illness. His death coincided with Samvidhan Divas (Constitution Day), a day of significance to his activism.

Following his death, tributes were paid by various figures, including the Speaker of the Tibetan Parliament in Exile, Pema Jungney, who condoled the loss of a "staunch and ardent supporter" of the Tibetan movement. Writer Maria Aurora Couto also wrote a tribute, recalling his directness and their friendship.
