= Sarto Almeida =

Indian architect (1924–2020)

- Sarto Almeida
- Born: 5 July 1924; Comba, Margao, Goa, Portuguese India
- Died: 26 May 2020 (aged 95); Seraulim, Goa, India
- Education: St. Joseph's Boys' High School, Bengaluru J. J. School of Architecture, Mumbai
- Occupation: Architect
- Spouse: Therese Almeida
- Buildings: Shree Samsthan Gokarn Partagali Jeevotham Math Goa Chamber of Commerce and Industries building, Panaji Goa College of Art, Panaji Carmelite Monastery Church
- Projects: Shree Samsthan Gokarn Partagali Jeevotham Math International Center, Dona Paula, Goa

Sarto Almeida (5 July 1924 – 26 May 2020) was an Indian architect whose work spanned Ahmedabad and Goa, where he designed a wide range of residential and institutional buildings.

Sarto Almeida’s Oral History is preserved in the CEPT Archives..

== Biography ==
Almeida's grandfather had a large plantation in East Africa. Sarto grew up with his father and brother Tony in Dar es Salaam in Tanzania. He lost his mother at a very young age. His ancestral family hailed from Chinchinim in Goa.

Sarto was born on 5 July 1924 in Comba, Margao, Goa, Portuguese India. Soon after his birth, he travelled with his mother to Dar es Salaam to join his father. In 1930s, he studied at St. Joseph's School, Bangalore and later at St. Xavier's College in Mumbai. He joined Sir J. J. School of Art, Mumbai where he studied sketching and drawing. He worked with Piloo Mody in Mumbai. Later he moved to Ahmedabad and worked with B. V. Doshi. He was influenced by Le Corbusier's modernist architecture while working there.

In 1962 Sarto went on his grand tour of Greece, France, Monte Carlo, Italy, Spain, England, Egypt and the USA. He travelled on this study tour of great Architecture (and jazz festivals). According to his wife, Sarto met with B. V. Doshi in the US, and visited Louis Kahn along with Vikram Sarabhai and attended the Design Conference at Aspen and as a music enthusiast, he also the Jazz Festival in Newport.

During his time in Ahmedabad with B. V. Doshi Sarto worked on many prestigious projects such as The Physical Research Laboratories and The Institute Of Indology. In 1960, Doshi was commissioned to build a campus for the Shreyas School by Leenaben Sarabhai. Shreyas was founded by Maria Montessori while she lived as a guest of the Sarabhai's during World War II.

He returned to Goa from Ahmedabad in 1963. Initially he had his office and home in Margao. He bought an old heritage house in Seraulim, South Goa and moved there with his family. He designed several buildings in Goa during his career. He was the first Chairman of the South Goa Planning and Development Authority. He was a member of the Ecological Control Committee and the Conservation Committee in Goa. Sarto's architectural work has been recognized and featured in numerous publications; in the land scape Journal of Landscape Architecture, Celebrating Contextual Modernist Architecture across two continents arch Miki Desai features both Almeida brothers—Sarto and his elder brother Toni—for their daring modernist vision and inspirational contributions to architecture.

Sarto Almeida died on 26 May 2020 in Seraulim, Goa.

== Works ==
Architect Sarto Almeida combined modernism with regionalism and prioritized functionality and rationality. He also worked for conservation and environmental protection as well as conservation of heritage buildings.

On a visit to the US, to attend the International Design Conference, Sarto along with Doshi and Vikram Sarabhai went to meet the renowned architect Louis Kahn, to invite him to design the Indian Institute Of Management and Sarto was asked to work with Kahn in Ahmedabad.

Sarto designed the Partagali Math at Canacona, Goa, developing a contemporary architectural expression rooted in traditional Goan and Indian temple architecture. His design incorporated stylized columns derived from post-Chalukyan architecture and pyramidal roof forms inspired by local temple architecture. The project was being undertaken through his architectural office by 1985, when architect Chitra Vishwanath worked on the project as an intern in his office.

A 2020 profile of Sarto Almeida in The Indian Express specifically identifies Partagali Math in Canacona as one of his architectural works. More importantly, it says that architect Chitra Vishwanath worked on the Partagali Math project while she was an intern in Sarto Almeida's office in 1985. The article also describes the Math as demonstrating Sarto's understanding of local temple architecture.

An article by Sarto Almeida himself, reproduced in the Goanet archive. In it, he discusses the Shree Salisthan Gokarn Partagali Jeevotham Math as a notable exception in contemporary Hindu temple architecture. He specifically explains the architectural approach:

- the stylized columns in the verandahs and courtyards were derived from the post-Chalukyan period;
- the pyramidal roof forms drew from local temple architecture;
- he presents the Math as an example of how contemporary architecture could engage meaningfully with traditional Hindu architectural forms.

A University of Goa research thesis on temple architecture specifically includes Partagali Jivottam Math among the sites studied and documents research involving the Math's temple records and interviews with the Swamiji of Partagal Math.

Sarto designed educational institutions, religious buildings, government buildings and several homes; mostly in Goa. These include Goa Chamber of Commerce and Industries building in Panaji, the Goa College of Art in Panaji, Carmelite Monastery Church at Aqueum, Partagali Math in Canacona, Laxmi Narayan Temple at Veling, Goa International Centre in Dona Paula, the auditorium at Father Agnel Polytechnic in Verna, SOS Children's Village, the Science Block at Carmel College, Padre Conceicao College of Engineering at Verna, Guardian Angel School at Sanvordem. He worked tirelessly for the success of Goa College of Architecture.

== Personal life ==
Soon after his visit to USA to invite American Architect Louis Kahn, Sarto married Therese Almeida so they opted to pursue better educational options for Goa. When they moved Goa, they founded the Manovikas English Medium School https://manovikas.edu.in/.

Sarto Almeida was one of Cartoonist Mário Miranda’s close, long-standing friends, part of the young Goan social circle that included Mário’s cousin Lúcio Miranda. The World of Mario… Seriously Funny!, a 46-minute Doordarshan Goa documentary on Mário Miranda, released online in 2022 includes interviews and archival material featuring Goan cultural figures connected with Mário’s life and legacy. The researcher/scriptwriter, Óscar de Noronha, has a detailed six-part online biography, Story of Mário, the Miranda. It explicitly documents Sarto Almeida as part of Mário’s social circle.

Sarto was then beginning his career as an architect, and the group regularly attended parties and dances together. A particularly memorable family detail: Sarto’s wedding was held at Mário’s Bombay house on 26 January 1963. Habiba later recalled that, after Sarto’s wedding that night, she and Mário decided to marry themselves; they were married on 10 November 1963.

Sarto contributed to several projects in Goa beyond architecture. Oral History Unplugged notes, "I arrived in Goa in July 1995, with absolutely no intention of doing anything. The only three people I knew here were Ar Sarto Almeida, his wife educator Therese Almeida and Efeminio (Babush) Godinho who worked in the Town & Country Planning Department then. Babush introduced me to architect Gerard da Cunha and my oral history research in Goa began."

A little-known fact about Sarto, per his wife Therese Almeida, is that he was once in a band. Music was not merely something he listened to; it was part of the way he inhabited the world. He loved music, dance and art in all its forms—the kind of beauty that asks nothing of you except that you notice it.

His brother Anthony Almeida was an architect in Tanzania. Mario Miranda and urban planner Edgar Rebeiro were his close friends.
