= Master Dattaram =

Indian theatre actor (1913–1984)

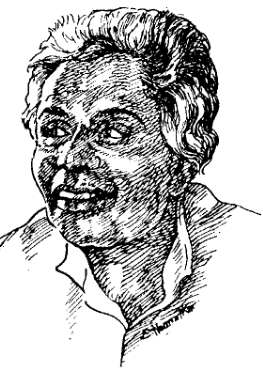
- Born: Dattaram Narayan Walwaikar; 10 June 1913; Volvoi, Portuguese Goa
- Died: 19 September 1984 (aged 71); Vasai, Maharashtra, India
- Occupations: Theatre actor, director
- Awards: Sangeet Natak Akademi Award (1978)

Master Dattaram, born Dattaram Narayan Walwaikar (also spelled as Dattaram Narayan Volvoikar; 10 June 1913 – 19 September 1984), was an Indian theatre actor and director from Goa. He is known for his work in the Marathi theatre, particularly for his association with the Goa Hindu Association and his roles in historical plays.

== Early life ==
Dattaram Narayan Walwaikar was born on 10 June 1913 in the village of Volvoi, Portuguese Goa. He received formal education up to the fourth grade, but reportedly lacked an interest in academic studies. Instead, he developed a passion for performance by participating in traditional Dashavtari plays.

== Career ==
=== Early career (1923–1940s) ===
At the age of 10, Dattaram joined the Lalitprabha musical troupe, led by Sakharam Barve. He briefly performed the role of Pendha in the play Kunjvihari, written by Mama Varerkar. He subsequently joined the Rang Bodhechhu Samaj, a theatre company run by Raghuvir Savkar. During his time with this group, he was noted for his performance as Kritike in the play Sanshaykallol. Although he did not receive formal training, he taught himself acting by observing established artists such as Nanasaheb Phatak, Chintamanrao Kolhatkar, and Ganpatrao Joshi.

Dattaram later joined the Prabhat Sangeet Mandal, owned by Vishnu Borkar. During his time there, he demonstrated versatility by enacting a wide range of roles, including heroes, heroines, villains, and comedic characters. He acted in plays such as Manaapman, Lalatlekh, Punyaprabhav, Paishancha Paus, Nekjat Maratha, and Rakshasi Mhavakansha. Beyond acting, he was involved in various aspects of theatre production, including costume design, curtain painting, accounting, and conducting rehearsals. He was also known for mentoring new artists within the company.

=== Move to Bombay and mainstream success ===
With the rise of cinema, the popularity of theatre began to decline, leading Dattaram to move to Bombay. Despite facing financial difficulties during this transition, he continued to pursue theatre with various groups.

His acting style was characterized by precise voice modulation, posture, and flexible movement. Significant roles during this period included Jaipal in Vaijayanti, the King in Janatecha Raja, Karna in Kaunteya, and the villain Udaji in Honaji Bal. He received acclaim for his portrayal of Ramashastri in a production that featured Nanasaheb Phatak as Raghoba and Durga Khote as Anandi. This specific production won the first prize at an all India all language theater festival held in New Delhi.

Dattaram was later invited to join the Lalitkaladarsha theatre company. He gained fame for his performances in plays such as Satteche Gulam, Sonyacha Kalas, Aakashganga, Duritche Timir Javo, and Panditraj Jagannath.

=== Direction and later years ===
Dattaram made significant contributions to the Goa Hindu Association's art department. He achieved major success directing and playing the lead role of Shivaji in the play Raigadala Jevha Jag Yete (When Raigad Wakes Up). He also directed the association's production of Matsyagandha, in which he played the character of Bhishma.

In his later years, Dattaram taught theatre studies. He died in Vasai on 19 September 1984.

== Legacy ==
In June 2012, Kala Academy celebrated a World Theatre Festival to commemorate the centenary year of Dattaram's birth. On his 100th birth anniversary in 2013, a book on his life was released as part of a special programme at the Institute Menezes Braganza.

An auditorium at Rajiv Gandhi Kala Mandir, Ponda, is named after him.
