= Manoharbua Shirgaonkar =

Indian singer (c. 1909–1914 – 1978)

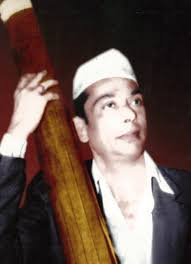
- Born: Ganesh Mukund Shirgaonkar c. 1909–1914; Pissurlem, Sattari taluka, Portuguese Goa
- Died: 5 August 1978; Dodamarg taluka, Sawantwadi, India
- Occupations: Bhajan singer, musician, theatre actor
- Known for: Creating the "Manohari bhajan" style
- Spouse: Saraswati
- Children: 6

Manoharbua Mukund Shirgaonkar (c. 1909–1914 – 5 August 1978), also known as Bhajan Samrat, was an Indian Bhajan singer and musician from Goa. Originally a theatre actor and instrumentalist, he is credited with developing a distinct style of devotional music known as "Manohari bhajan", which blends the Warkari tradition with classical vocal music.

== Early life ==
Shirgaonkar was born in Pissurlem, Sattari taluka, Portuguese Goa. His birth date is estimated to be between 1909 and 1914. His birth name was Ganesh, and he was affectionately known by the nickname "Sukdo". He was later given the name "Manohar" by the vocalist Dinanath Mangeshkar.

He was born to Mukunda and Rukmini Shirgaonkar. His family's traditional occupation involved service at the Lairai temple in Shirgaon, where they played the shehnai and accompanied the mridangam. Shirgaonkar received Marathi education up to the fifth standard. At the age of 20, he married Saraswati. The couple had three sons, Narayan, Shashikant, and Gurudas, and three daughters, Vinabai, Vaijayanti, and Latika.

== Career ==
=== Music and theatre ===
Shirgaonkar was trained in music from a young age within his household. He was proficient in five instruments: the shehnai, surt, kansale, tasso, and dhol. He received formal training in the tabla from Bhivamama and studied classical music under Sakharam of Verem.

Early in his career, Shirgaonkar was active in Marathi theatre. In 1935, he joined a drama company formed by residents of Shirgaon. He performed various roles in several plays, including Menaka, Nandakumar (playing the role of Radha), Ugramangal (playing Padnavati), Naradachi Nardi (playing Narada), Pranayi Kantak (playing Shantaram), Pant's Daughter (playing both a Doctor and Prabhakar) and Sant Sakhu (playing Sakhu).

=== Bhajan singing ===
Shirgaonkar's transition to devotional music began during his involvement with the play Sant Sakhu, where he performed abhangs (devotional poetry) dedicated to the deity Vitthal. He further developed his knowledge of the genre by observing scholars and kirtankars (musical storytellers) while accompanying them on the tabla and harmonium. He developed a unique style of performance termed "Manohari bhajan." This style synthesized the traditional Warkari bhajan format with elements of classical concert music. He taught this method extensively throughout Goa. A compilation of his performances with his associates was released on cassette under the title Manohari Bhajane.

== Death ==
Shirgaonkar died on 5 August 1978 in Dodamarg taluka, Sawantwadi.

== Legacy ==
In 1962, he was felicitated by Sakharam Pandurang Barve at Vaygini village in Bicholim. He was honored by Shishir Kumar Banerjee at an All India Gandharva Mahavidyalaya Conference held in November. In 1973, he was felicitated in his native village of Shirgaon upon turning sixty. Since 1980, the Kala Academy of Goa has organized an annual state-level Bhajan competition in August to commemorate his memory.
