= Chira Bazaar =

Neighborhood in Mumbai, India

Coordinates: 18.948140°N 72.825462°E

Chira Bazaar is a neighborhood in Mumbai. It is famous for its jewellery and Marathi community. There is also a famous fish market called Chirabazar. It also has a wide range of Jewelry shops. It is located near Kalbadevi and Marine Lines.

Singer-songwriter Jaimin Rajani's maternal home is known to be there.

== Historical Background ==
Chira Bazaar is a historic neighborhood located in Kalbadevi, South Mumbai, renowned for its lively jewellery, fish, and vegetable markets and it is situated in Mumbai's bustling commercial core.

Over time, Chira Bazaar's lanes grew dense with small businesses. Its reputation solidified around jewellery trading, particularly gold and silverware—and expanded to include a fish market, serving both vendors and residents alike. The area's proximity to other famous trading zones like Zaveri Bazaar and Crawford Market further cemented its status as a wholesale and retail marketplace.

A notable landmark was the 150-year-old Chira Bazaar market, a historic building utilized by many fisherwomen and local vendors. In 2018, it faced demolition to make way for Mumbai's Metro Line 3, sparking protests by those whose livelihoods depended on it.

Chira Bazaar serves as a microcosm of Mumbai's commercial and cultural tapestry—reflecting the city's layered tradition, commerce, and urban life. Academic studies note how bazaar areas like Chira Bazaar serve as living intersections of tangible and intangible cultural heritage, through centuries of trading activity and community life.
