= Bhalchandra Mungekar =

Indian politician (born 1946)

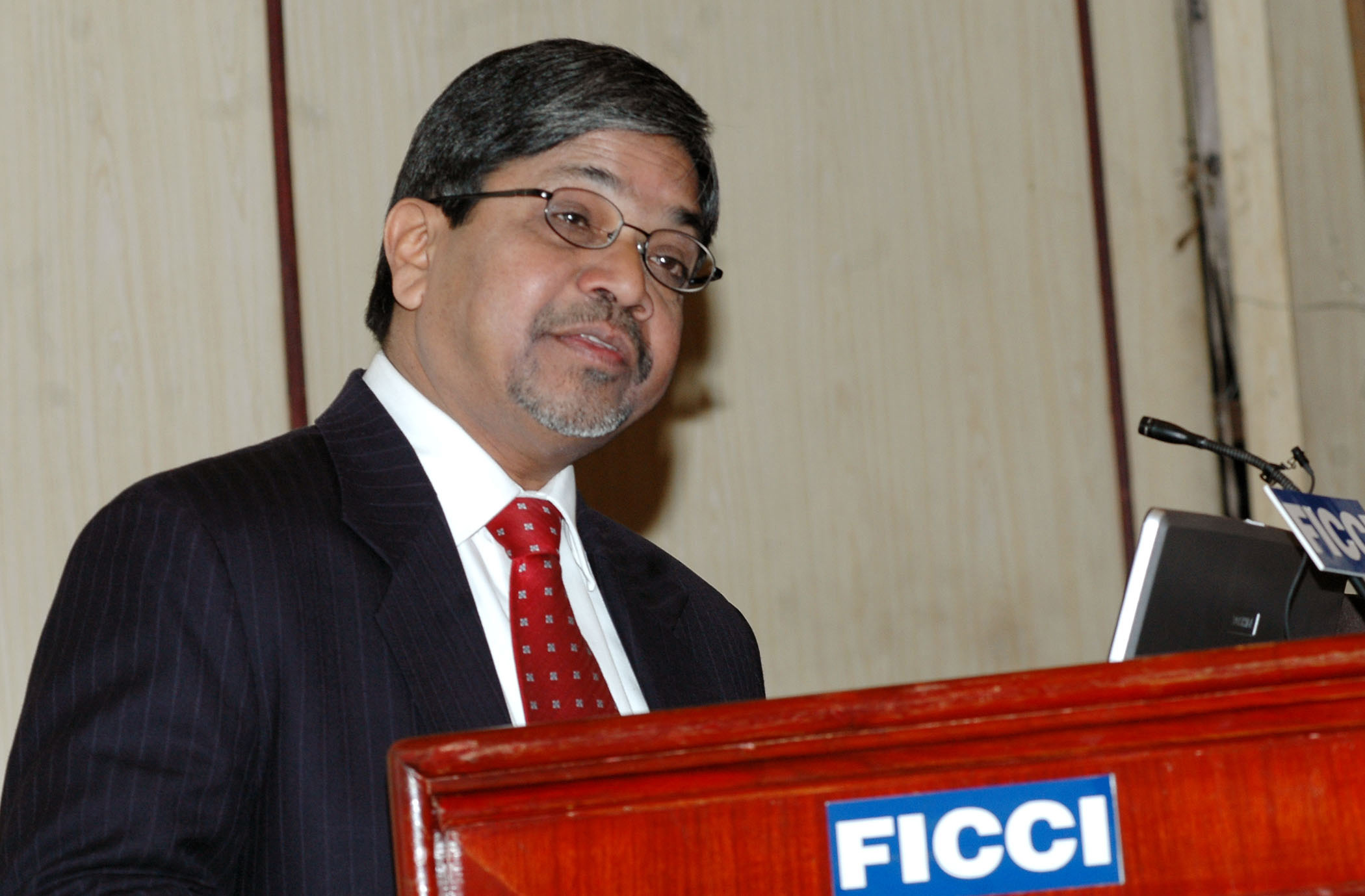

Former nominated MP of the Rajya Sabha
- In office 22 March 2010 to 21 March 2016
- Preceded by: Dara Singh, BJP

Personal details
- Born: 2 March 1946 (age 80) Deogad, Sindhudurg district
- Party: Indian National Congress
- Spouse: Leena Bhalchandra Mungekar (m. 1971)
- Children: 3

Bhalchandra Laxman Mungekar (born 2 March 1946) is an Indian economist, educationist, social worker and Rajya Sabha member. He specialises in agricultural economics and is an expert on B. R. Ambedkar.

== Early life ==
Mungekar was born in Munge village to Laxman Gopal Mungekar and Shewanti Mungekar, in the Konkan region of Maharashtra. He studied at the Navbharat Vidyalaya at Parel and Siddharth English High School at Wadala and did B.A., M.A., and Ph.D. in economics from University of Mumbai. In 1965, he joined Reserve Bank of India as a clerk and was elevated to the rank of assistant economist.

== Career ==
He has been Vice-Chancellor of the University of Mumbai and has served in the Planning Commission, the Agricultural Price Commission of India. Mungekar has also been the chairman and President of Indian Institute of Advanced Study, Shimla and also he has been the chairman of University Grants Commission. He is also a writer, great philosopher and was an economics teacher at Siddharth College of Arts, Science and Commerce.

== Personal life ==
He is influenced by Ambedkarite ideology, and a follower of Buddhism.
