= Hirabai Pednekar =

Indian playwright (1885–1951)

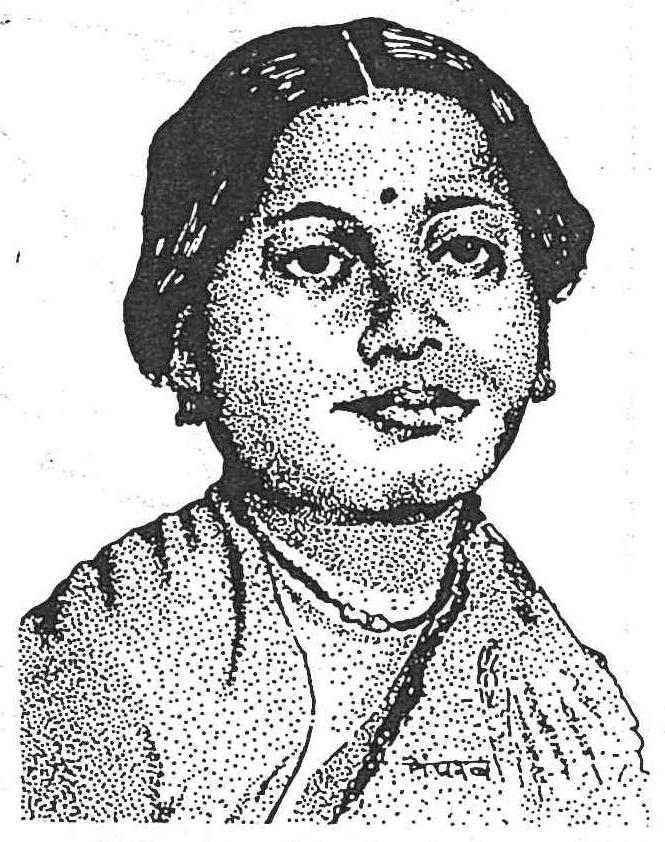
- Born: 22 November 1885; Sawantwadi, Bombay Presidency, British India
- Died: 18 October 1951 (aged 65); Palshet, Guhagar, Ratnagiri district, Maharashtra, India
- Occupations: Playwright, poet, musician
- Known for: First female playwright in Marathi theatre
- Notable work: Jayadratha Vidamban; Sangeet Damini

Hirabai Pednekar (22 November 1885 – 18 October 1951) was an Indian playwright, poet, and musician. A member of the Goan Maratha community, she is considered the first female playwright in Marathi theatre.

== Early life and education ==
Pednekar was born on 22 November 1885 in Sawantwadi (then part of the Sawantwadi State). She was born into a family of artists from the Devadasi community; her mother was a courtesan (nayakin) who died when Pednekar was an infant. Following her mother's death, she was adopted and raised by her aunt, Bhimabai, who brought her to Girgaum, Mumbai, when she was around eight years old.

In Mumbai, they lived in the Ganjawala Chawl (or Kande Bhuvan). Her aunt, who was patronized by the businessman Premchand Roychand, ensured Pednekar received a formal education, which was rare for women of her background at the time. She attended the Naviwadi missionary school and completed her education up to the seventh grade. Additionally, she studied six languages, including Sanskrit, Bengali, and English.

Pednekar grew up in a musically rich environment, as her aunt hosted mehfils (musical gatherings) at their home. She received extensive training in music from prominent vocalists such as Pandit Bhaskarbuwa Bakhale, Parshurampant Barve, and Fayyaz Khansaheb of Baroda.

== Career ==
=== Theatre and literature ===
Pednekar's literary career flourished due to her association with elite cultural figures who visited her home, including Govind Ballal Deval, Shripad Krushna Kolhatkar, and Ram Ganesh Gadkari.

She wrote her first play, Jayadratha Vidamban, in 1904 at the age of roughly 19. It is a full-length play based on a mythological theme. It is cited as the first Marathi play written by a woman. Although the play was published, it was not performed on stage for nearly a century. It was eventually staged experimentally in Ponda by a theatre organization led by Vijaykumar Naik.

Her second play, Sangeet Damini, was published in 1912. Initially, theatre companies were hesitant to stage a play written by a woman from her community. However, the playwright Mama Warerkar persuaded Keshavrao Bhosale of the Lalitkaladarsha Natak Mandali to produce it. The play was successful, running for four years, and contained over 70 songs. Through Damini, Pednekar presented progressive themes, arguing that social distinctions between men and women were artificial.

In addition to playwrighting, Pednekar was a poet whose work appeared in the literary magazine Manoranjan. She also wrote a satirical "autobiography" about a frustrated playwright who only finds fame after being jailed.

=== Music composition ===
Pednekar was also a composer. She provided music for Ram Ganesh Gadkari's play Punyaprabhav. It is believed she also contributed dialogue and movements to other musical plays of the era. The heroine of Gadkari's play Premshodhan was reportedly modeled on Pednekar's personality.

== Later life and death ==
In her later years, Pednekar moved to Palshet near Guhagar in the Ratnagiri district, where she lived with Krishnaji Nene. She spent this period in relative obscurity. She died on 18 October 1951 of cancer. (Note: Some sources, such as the Konkani Vishwakosh, list her death year as 1941.)

== Legacy ==
Pednekar's life and work have been the subject of recent scholarship and theatre.

- Biography: In 2017, the journalist Shilpa Surve published a biography titled Adya Mahila Natakkaar Hirabai Pednekar (transl. The First Woman Playwright: Hirabai Pednekar).
- Theatre: The playwright and director Vijaykumar Naik wrote and directed a play titled Palshetchi Vihir, which is based on Pednekar's life.
