= Vishwasrao Chowgule =

Indian industrialist (1915–2008)

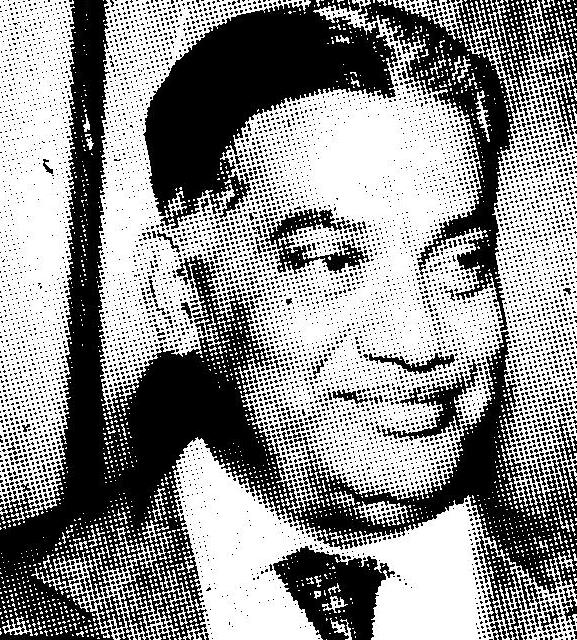
- Born: 24 August 1915; Haldi, Kolhapur, Kolhapur State, British India
- Died: 4 October 2008 (aged 93); Vasco da Gama, Goa, India
- Occupation: Businessman
- Known for: Expansion of Chowgule Brothers into mining
- Children: 6

Vishwasrao Chowgule (24 August 1915 – 4 October 2008) was an Indian industrialist and mining executive from Goa. He is recognized as a prominent mine owner and entrepreneur who expanded his family's enterprise, Chowgule Brothers, into a large diversified conglomerate. In 1976, the Government of India officially declared him the wealthiest person in India based on wealth tax statistics.

== Early life and education ==
Vishwasrao Chowgule was born on 24 August 1915 in Haldi, Kolhapur, into a middle-class family. He received his primary education at Mission High School and later completed his matriculation examination at Beynon Smith High School in Belgaum. He subsequently enrolled at Karnataka College in Dharwad for higher studies; however, due to financial hardships at home, he was forced to discontinue his college education midway.

== Career ==
=== Early career and World War II ===
Chowgule began his professional career as a clerk at Lionel Edwards and Company in Mormugao, where he worked for six months to gain experience in the shipping and export industries. He then entered the clearing and forwarding trade by joining a firm called Mormugao Agents. Following this, he joined his family's business, Chowgule Brothers, which was involved in cargo loading and unloading, shipping agencies, Protection and Indemnity (P&I) clubs, and import-export operations.

With the outbreak of World War II in 1939, Mormugao port emerged as a critical hub for exporting wartime materials. Chowgule capitalized on this by exporting commodities such as teak wood, bamboo, and coconut oil. He also procured substantial quantities of goods from Lisbon to distribute to various countries.

=== Post-independence and mining expansion ===
Following the independence of India on 15 August 1947, Chowgule's company expanded its mining exports, sending 1,500 tons of manganese ore to Czechoslovakia in 1947 and 9,000 tons of iron ore to Japan in 1950. He successfully negotiated business deals with Japanese steel mills, securing buyers for Goan iron ore and stimulating the region's mining sector.

During this period, Chowgule secured financial assistance from Japanese steel corporations to establish a mechanized ore handling plant at Mormugao, which was the first facility of its kind in the Eastern world. His economic assessments also led to the introduction of mechanized barges to transport iron ore from inland mines to nearby rivers, significantly advancing the local barge industry.

=== Post-liberation and diversification ===
After the Liberation of Goa in 1961, Chowgule ventured into multiple new industries. He established several enterprises, including Chowgule Steamships, Mandovi Pellets, Konkan Fisheries, Karnataka Explosives, Arlem Breweries, Chowgule Shipyard, and Narmada Cement. The Chowgule Group eventually expanded its operations across various Indian states, including Goa, Maharashtra, Karnataka, Gujarat, Tamil Nadu, and Odisha.

Chowgule constructed a large-scale pelletization plant in Shiroda, which was the first in India and the third largest in the world within the iron ore industry. However, the facility was forced to shut down after its financial viability was severely impacted by the 1970s energy crisis.

=== Leadership roles ===
Chowgule served as the president of the Goa Chamber of Commerce and Industry for four consecutive years, during which he introduced new operational directions for the organization. Additionally, he served as the president of the All India Shipping Council.

== Personal life ==
Chowgule had six children: three sons, Vijay, Ashok and Umaji, and three daughters, Sarita, Rohini and Padma.

== Death ==
Chowgule died on 4 October 2008 after a brief illness at his residence in Baina, Vasco da Gama, Goa.

== Philanthropy and media ==
Chowgule founded several public welfare and educational institutions, including the Parvatibai Chowgule College in Margao, the St. Joseph's Institute in Vasco, and the Chowgule Hospital. On 26 January 1962, he launched Gomantak, a Marathi daily newspaper that achieved the highest circulation in Goa.

== Awards and recognition ==
- In 1953, the Portuguese government conferred an honorary title of distinction (Sardarki) upon Chowgule for his efforts in mechanizing the Sirigao iron mine.
- In 1959, the Portuguese government honored him with the title of "Commander" in recognition of his contributions to the mining sector.
- In 1976, he was declared the wealthiest individual in India by the Government of India.
- During the silver jubilee celebrations of Goa's liberation, he was formally felicitated by the Government of Goa at the hands of the former President of India, Giani Zail Singh.
- On 25 August 1991, his 75th birthday (Amrit Mahotsav) was celebrated with a major public event.
