= Aniceto Nazareth =

Indian Roman Catholic priest (1938–2021)

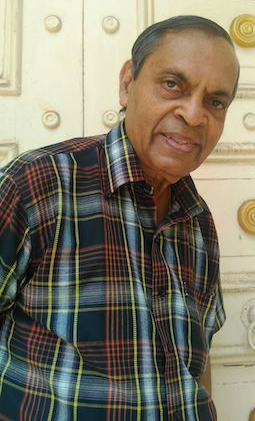
Aniceto Nazareth

Aniceto Nazareth (30 July 1938 – 8 March 2021) was a Roman Catholic priest of the Archdiocese of Bombay, musician, published composer and liturgist.

== Family history ==
Born in Bombay, Aniceto was the youngest of 14 children, two of them girls. His father was John Christopher Nazareth of Pomburpa, a small tourist resort, known for its warm and cold springs; and mother Umbelina Vaz of Uccaçaim, Goa. Both parents played the violin. Three of his siblings chose the religious life, Stephen and Aniceto as diocesan priests and Edvige as a Salesian Sister.

His parents encouraged and did everything to educate their children in the world of music. Their gifts always included music sheets, recorded music, a better piano and other musical instruments. Aniceto regularly accompanied his brothers to concerts, movies and the All India Radio and other studios to make recordings. His mother took him daily for Mass which was then in Latin.

== Early life and musical background (1938-1956) ==
As was the custom in colonial times in the city of Bombay (now Mumbai), Aniceto's formal education started only by age six. Following his admission test at St. Xavier's High School Fort, he was directly assigned to Std IV. His drill teacher asked him to play Marches at the calisthenics class. At the age of 7, he gave his first classical piano recital at a school function, playing Fritz Kreisler's Liebesfreud and for an encore a Brazilian Samba, Tico Tico. He also played the organ at church services in school and in his parish of St John the Evangelist, Fort. He passed the audition for All India Radio and played for the Children's Hour, as well as for contests relayed through Radio Ceylon.

Aniceto Nazareth had no formal musical training, but was a keen listener of the great Classical Masters and studied their chords and progressions. He was also influenced by the extraordinary accompaniments to simple hymns played by Victor Paranjoti, Peter Andrade, Ethel Athaide at the Holy Name & St Thomas Cathedrals. They set the standard for him in church music and his future publications. He learnt the art of arranging music for equal voices, by listening to his older brothers sing. Thus he grew into music thanks to the background in which he lived, playing back what he listened to and later writing his own compositions which were accepted by publishers both in India and abroad.

== Seminary years (1956-1966) ==
After graduating at 18 in Medical Biology from St Xavier's College, he joined the Seminary at Parel which later moved to its present location at the Diocesan Seminary at Goregaon. Here, Aniceto completed his studies in Philosophy and Theology in 1966 and was finally ordained on 21 December 1966, by Valerian Cardinal Gracias.

These were momentous years for the Church, with the Second Vatican Council (11 October 1962 to 8 December 1965) and the New Documents which followed and Pope Paul VI visit to India for the 38th International Eucharistic Congress (December 1964). At the Congress, during the visit of Pope Paul VI, Aniceto Nazareth while still a seminarian, served as organist and music arranger for the huge Gregorian and polyphonic choir assembled under the baton of Fr. J.B. Fernandes, founder of the Newman choir. (Choir Picture)

The Eucharistic Congress was followed by the composition and publication of appropriate chants in keeping with the recommendations of Vatican II in which Br. Aniceto Nazareth played a major role. He assisted Fr. Jean Mercier, in printing and distributing a series of musical scores for new hymns titled Sing a New Song, followed by a word publication With Joyful Lips and another abridged version, Celebration.

== Pastoral ministry (1966-2021) ==
His pastoral ministry at St. Francis Xavier church Vile Parle was short-lived as he was soon called upon by Cardinal Gracias to teach liturgy and music at the seminary.

His grounding in new revised post Vatican II Liturgy came from his Licentiate Studies at Sant Anselmo's, Rome. When he returned to Bombay, it was his task to educate people on the new shape of the liturgy. He revived the Archdiocesan Liturgy Committee [ALC] and was its Secretary for 30 years. As of 2016, he was still on the Board of Censors for Music in English.

The need of the hour were text books on the study of liturgy. So Aniceto compiled his own notes based on his study, which were later published as low priced books simple enough for all to understand. On the Mass he published "Proclaim" on the Liturgy of the Word as well as "Crumbs from the Master’s Table" on essential Interior attitudes at the Table of the Eucharist. Next on the list was a study on the Liturgical Year, "The Presence of Jesus in Time" and one on Liturgical Music, "Let’s Sing the Paschal Mystery" (March 2005) which from its very cover page told cantors not to "sing", unless they had something "relevant and appropriate to sing" for the celebration of the Mass.

Within a few years there were an increasing number of people who were eager to be educated on the new shape of the liturgy. Ministers of the Word and of Holy Communion were now organized and trained. Cantors and choirs began to understand that they were not performers but prayer leaders. The Basic Liturgy Course ensured that there were now trained lay people who could help teach the topics that came under the umbrella of Liturgy, while the books and Vatican II Documents like Sacrosanctum, served as reference guides. This coincided with the new thrust in the archdiocese towards involving the laity in the ministry of the church.

== Liturgical choir – the PROCLAIMERS ==
Post Vatican II, with the new emphasis on congregational singing, questions were raised about the need for a choir. It was in this context Aniceto started a Liturgical choir the PROCLAIMERS. As part of its training, the choir focused on the new Liturgy; and sang in five voices instead of the customary 4 voices. The fifth voice sang the melody on a key convenient to the congregation, thus encouraging the participation of the assembly. The choir encouraged the participation of the assembly at workshops they gave in 88 churches in the city and in 19 other towns in India. In a sense Aniceto Nazareth led a Liturgical Renewal of the music ministry. He believed that choirs can help people sing and should not be shut down. Instead they should provide an accompaniment to the congregation, just as an organ does.

The Proclaimers under the direction of Aniceto Nazareth were called upon to sing at several Diocesan gatherings like the Episcopal Ordination of Bishops Agnelo and Percival and the felicitation of Archbishop Ivan Dias who was elevated as Cardinal.

== Retirement ==
Post retirement, in his new role as Parish Priest, Aniceto continued taking liturgical and classical music directly to his congregations. Placed in charge of training for the Revised Missal by Cardinal Oswald Gracias, he and his team helped introduce it to the churches of Mumbai in 2011.

His new Masses are based on themes from the great Masters - the Gloria based on the slave chorus from Nebuchadnezzar by Verdi and an entire Mass based on Handel. The people's parts are kept easy to learn and sing.

Aniceto Nazareth, after completing stints as parish priest, lived a retired life at the Parish house of St. Joseph Church in Umerkhadi, located near the Sandhurst Road Station on Mumbai's Harbour line, where he continued to compose music and offer training on Music and Liturgy until November 2020. In December 2020, Aniceto was diagnosed with cancer and underwent treatment. Aniceto died on 8 March 2021 at Shanti Avedna, an hospice that predominantly provides palliative care, in Bandra, Mumbai.

== Songs by Aniceto ==
- A New Commandment
- I Am The Light Bringing You Out
- Blest Are You Lord
- Ring Out Your Joy
- Great Indeed Are Your Works
- Put On The Armour Of Jesus Christ
- Song Of Simeon
- Listen Let Your Heart Keep Seeking
- Come And Be Filled
- Go In Peace To Be Christ's Body
- Our Joy O Lord Is In You
- Greater Love
- Take This And Eat It
- I'll Turn My Steps
- Lord Have Mercy
- O Lord Furnace Of Love
- Without Seeing You
- Our Hearts Were Made For You Lord
- Faith In God Can Move
- Send Forth Your Spirit O Lord
- Veronica's song
