= Mark Revlon =

Singer and drummer

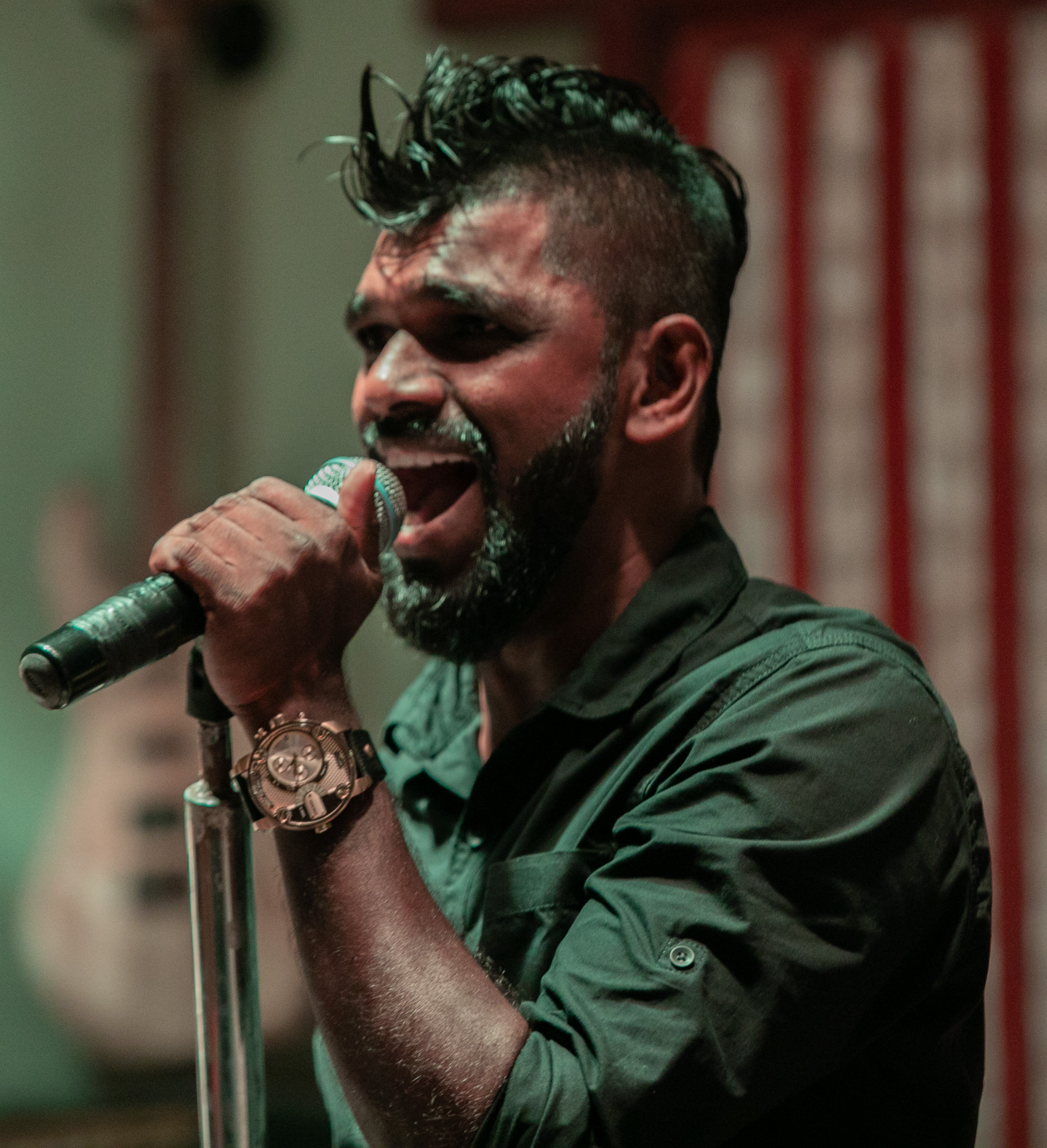
- Fernandes in 2019
- Born: Mark Revlon Fernandes; 14 August
- Occupations: Singer; drummer; music producer
- Spouse: Polita Gonsalves
- Children: 2
- Musical career
- Origin: Loutolim, South Goa
- Genres: Goan music
- Instruments: Vocals; drums
- Years active: 1996–present
- Member of: Mark Revlon Band
- Formerly of: Luke's Band; Headlines
- Website: facebook.com/MarkRevlon10

Mark Revlon Fernandes is a singer, drummer, and music producer. He initially joined his brother Luke's band as a drummer and singer in 1996. Subsequently, he formed a four-piece band called Headlines with Luke. He gained popularity following the single releases of "Ek ek dis", "Dis Udelho", and "Rise as one Goa", as well as cover songs "Celina" and "Sopnam". An autodidactic musician, he is the bandleader of the Mark Revlon Band.

== Early life ==
Mark Revlon Fernandes was born on 14 August. He has a brother named Luke. Fernandes was exposed to music from a young age, as his father was a tiatrist - a performer in the Goan theater tradition. Watching his father entertain audiences with musical performances had an impact on him, inspiring him to pursue a career in music. During his formative years, he nurtured a fascination for music, with a specific emphasis on the art of drumming. In the absence of formal training, he independently learned how to play the drums through self-instruction.

Fernandes described how, during his childhood, he honed his skills by using everyday objects such as pots and pans to create rhythmic sounds through practice, which helped nurture his passion for percussion. He also has personal connections to the cultural traditions of Goa. Fernandes has ancestral roots in Vanxim island through his maternal grandmother and often visited the island during his childhood breaks, immersing in the local festivities, including the Bonderam harvest festival in Divar island. Prior to his musical career, he was involved in amateur football, participating in inter-village competitions.

== Career ==
Fernandes' initial introduction to music occurred in 1996 when his brother Luke introduced him to the musical world. At the time, Fernandes took up music despite the technological limitations of the era. His brother Luke, a musician, facilitated his exposure to music by supplying him with cassette tapes and CDs to enhance his singing and percussion abilities. In the year 1994, Luke initiated the formation of a musical ensemble, with Fernandes becoming a member in 1996. Luke would share recordings by artists such as Freddie Mercury and Boney M. with Fernandes, exposing him to a variety of musical influences. Additionally, Fernandes expanded his musical knowledge by engaging with a variety of music genres broadcast on the radio.

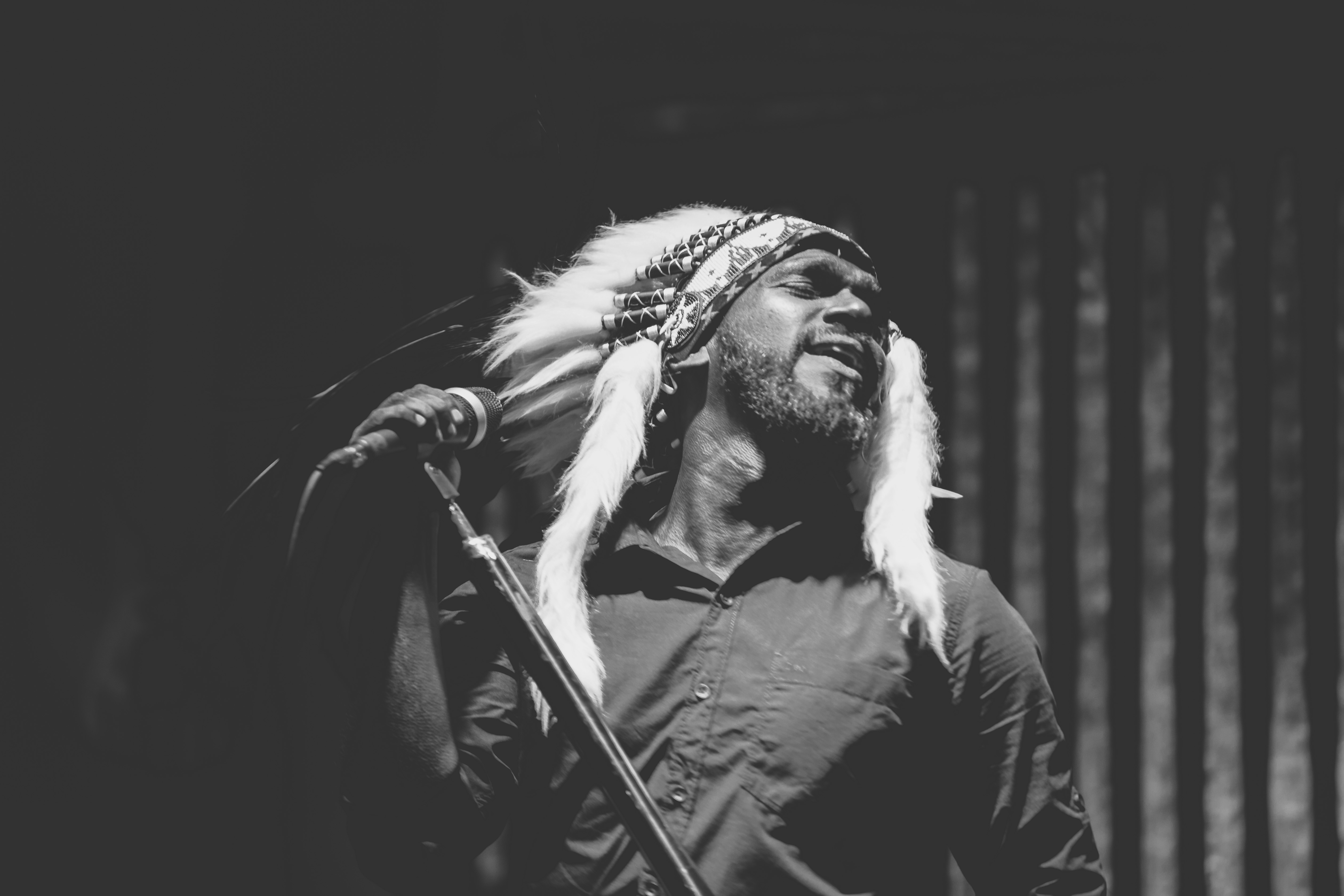
Fernandes performing live in 2019.

The four-piece musical group "Headlines" was formed in 1996 by the Fernandes brothers in Goa. The band's original lineup consisted of Franky on the keyboard, Edmund performed on bass, Chris was responsible for the lead guitar, and Fernandes contributed on drums and as the lead singer. The formation of Headlines followed the earlier breakup of a band that had been started by Luke in 1994. This earlier group's dissolution led the Fernandes brothers to come together and establish the new four-piece ensemble. In terms of their musical style, Headlines is described as blending elements of dance and song.

Fernandes's repertoire features a mix of original compositions as well as cover versions of other artists' works. Some of the Fernandes's popular original songs include "Ek ek dis", "Dis Udelho", and "Rise as one Goa", which has gained him popularity among Goan audiences. Additionally he performed covers, such as "Celina" and "Sopnam", that have been well received by Goan music fans both locally and internationally. Headlines has primarily directed its live performances towards the state of Goa, seeking to harmonize their artistic aspirations with the musical preferences of their regional audience.

Fernandes is known for his multilingual repertoire and international performances. In 2014, he took part in the United Kingdom's singing competition known as the Voice of UK, though he did not advance past the second round. Lacking formal vocal training, he expressed satisfaction in making it as far as he did in the competition. Fernandes is adept at singing in a diverse range of Indian and foreign languages, including Hindi, Konkani, and Marathi, as well as English, Portuguese, Kazakh, Italian, and Russian, respectively. His linguistic versatility allows him to cater to diverse audiences, particularly Goan listeners, for whom he performs songs in Konkani in addition to Hindi and English. He has maintained an active international performance schedule, appearing at nightclubs and other events in the United States, Australia, Bahrain, Oman, the United Arab Emirates, Macau, Kazakhstan, the United Kingdom, Russia, Italy, Switzerland, and England. In reflecting on his musical journey, he has emphasized the importance of community support and the challenges of composing original material.

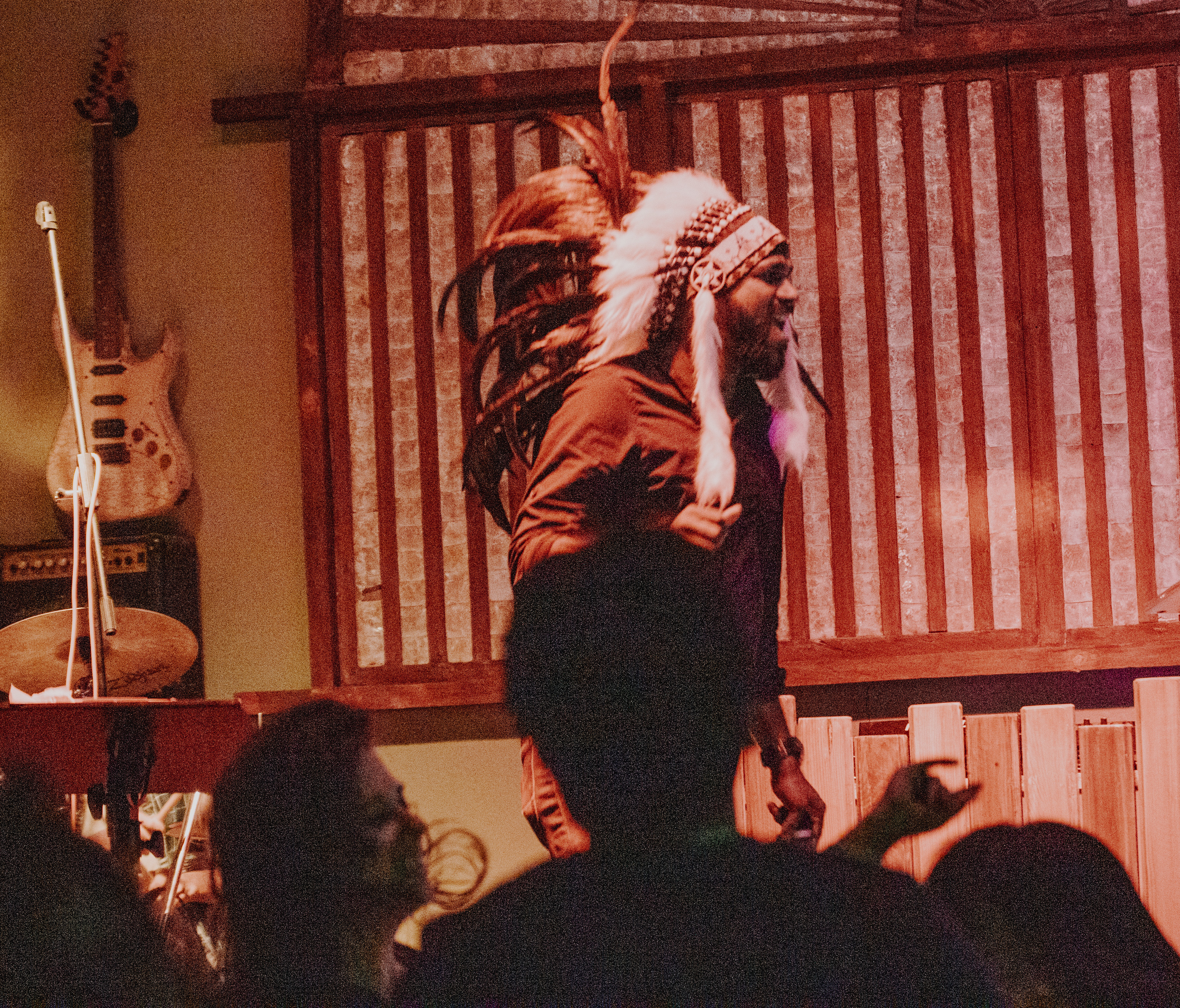
Fernandes wearing a war bonnet during a live performance in 2019.

Fernandes collaborated with Royston and Revlon Jackson in 2017 to create the audiovisual music track "Rise as One". The idea for the project originated from Royston, who worked in conjunction with the Goa Sevens Premier League (GSPL) to develop the musical arrangement and lyrical content for the occasion. Fernandes was subsequently brought on to perform the lead vocals for the track. Upon receipt of the initial lyrical content, a collaborative effort ensued involving Royston, Jackson, and Fernandes to refine and enhance the material through a series of revisions and improvisations before recording the vocal parts, which was completed in approximately two hours.

Fernandes has commented on the value of collaborative creative efforts, highlighting the experience gained through working with others. He highlighted the benefits of cooperating with individuals from different backgrounds to elevate his performance experience and cater to a broader spectrum of audiences. In April 2023, London, he inaugurated his live performance journey by hosting three shows consecutively over a three-day period in the districts of Hounslow and Southall. He is the lead vocalist for a musical group known as the "Mark Revlon Band", which is credited to be one of the popular bands based in the state of Goa.

== Personal life ==
Fernandes was raised in the village of Loutolim, with ancestral ties to the island of Vanxim through his maternal grandmother. His brother Luke, is a fellow musician. In addition to his musical pursuits, Fernandes has demonstrated proficiency in the sport of football. He has shared that in the absence of his music career, he would have potentially explored a path as a professional footballer. He continues to play amateur football, participating in inter-village competitions in the Goa region. During the 2017–2018 season, he played for the Social Cultural Club Loutolim.

In November 2023, Fernandes helped guide the Guirdolim Club to the quarterfinals of the Fr Gervasio Pinto football tournament. He is also known for his linguistic abilities, a polyglot, singing professionally in eight different languages - Hindi, Konkani, Marathi, English, Portuguese, Kazakh, Italian, and Russian. He is married to Polita Lurdes Gonsalves. As of July 2022, Fernandes and his wife are no longer Indian citizens.
