= Mahanand Naik =

Indian serial killer (born c. 1969)

- Other name: Dupatta Killer
- Motive: Robbery
- Penalty: Life imprisonment

Details
- Victims: 16–18 (disputed)
- Span of crimes: 1994–2009
- Country: India
- State: Goa
- Date apprehended: 21 April 2009

Mahanand Naik (born c. 1969) is an Indian serial killer convicted of murdering multiple women in the state of Goa. He became known by the nickname "Dupatta Killer" for his modus operandi of strangling his victims with their own dupatta (scarf).

Operating for approximately 15 years between 1994 and 2009, Naik targeted young, unmarried women from poor backgrounds. He would promise to marry them, lure them to isolated locations, murder them, and rob them of their gold and money. Sources conflict on the total number of victims, with figures cited between 16 and 18 women.

Naik, who was married with a child and worked as an auto-rickshaw driver, was arrested in 2009. He was convicted and sentenced to life imprisonment.

== Crimes and modus operandi ==
Naik's criminal activities spanned 15 years, beginning around 1994. His public persona was that of an auto-rickshaw driver from Shiroda, who was married and had a child. He sometimes adopted aliases or posed as a businessman to gain his victims' trust.

His targets were consistently young women, often in their 30s, who came from economically disadvantaged backgrounds, such as housemaids or tailors, and were seeking marriage. He would frequent bus stands in Goan cities like Ponda, Panaji, Margao, and Mapusa to identify and befriend potential victims.

Naik's method involved gaining the woman's trust by promising to marry her, sometimes convincing them to elope in secret. He would persuade his victims to wear their "finest jewelry" for the supposed wedding. He would then lead them to an isolated, desolate location, where he would sometimes offer them ice cream or make small talk to lower their guard before strangling them, most often using the victim's own dupatta. The primary motive was financial; after the murder, he would steal the victim's gold and any cash she was carrying. Some victims were also sexually assaulted. He would later sell the stolen jewelry at local shops, often fabricating stories about needing funds for a sick family member.

His first known victim was a 30-year-old woman in Khandepar in 1994. After this, he reportedly maintained a low profile for several years before resuming his killings with increased frequency between 2004 and 2009, killing 13 more women in that period. The number of women he murdered is disputed, with reports citing at least 12, 16, or 18 victims. His ability to evade detection for 15 years has been attributed to his choice of victims, who were from poor communities and whose disappearances often received little media or legal attention.

== Investigation and arrest ==
Naik was arrested by Goa Police on 21 April 2009. His capture was not the direct result of the murder investigations, but stemmed from a separate complaint of rape and blackmail filed by a young woman.

The investigation that led to his arrest began after the disappearance of a 30-year-old woman in January 2009. Unlike in previous cases, her family actively persuaded the police for answers. Inspector Chetan Patil, tracing her call records, discovered a call made from her phone using a stolen SIM card. This SIM card's number was traced to the woman who subsequently filed the rape and blackmail complaint against Naik, revealing she had been his victim for four years.

A police constable, who was a relative of another woman Naik was actively targeting, recognized Naik's photo in connection with the rape complaint. The constable had seen Naik with his relative. This connection allowed the police to apprehend Naik, which subsequently led to him being linked to the series of murders. The woman who was his target at the time of his arrest, and who consequently assisted the police, later faced social stigma for her association with the case.

Once in custody for rape, Naik confessed to the series of murders and led officers to the burial sites of his victims. It was later reported that Naik had been briefly detained in 1994 following his first murder, after a witness reported seeing the victim with a "bearded man." However, he was released due to a lack of evidence and supporting testimony from his fellow rickshaw drivers.

== Legal proceedings and imprisonment ==
Following his arrest, Mahanand Naik was tried, convicted of murder, and sentenced to life imprisonment by a Goa court. Notably, he was acquitted in 9 of these murders.

He is incarcerated at the Central Jail in Colvale, Goa.

In June 2023, Naik was granted a 21-day furlough by prison authorities. The decision to grant him temporary release caused public shock and raised fears, particularly for the woman who had been instrumental in his 2009 arrest. As part of his furlough conditions, he was required to report to the Old Goa Police station.

== In popular culture ==
Naik's crimes have been the subject of media adaptations.

- A 2010 tiatr, Mahanand: Monis vo Soitan? (transl. Mahanand: Man or Satan?) was based on Naik's case by Tony Dias. Franky Gonsalves released a sequel to the same tiatr in 2023 titled, Mahanand Devmonis? (transl. Mahanand Man of God?).
- In October 2025, a book titled Goa ka Dupatta Killer was authored by Mukesh Kumar, Senior Reporter of Prudent Media, detailing the case.
- A 2025 book by Auda Viegas titled A Silent Inveterate Serial Killer: A Product of “Chalta Hai” Society.
- A documentary based on his life and crimes titled The Dupatta Killer, directed by Patrick Graham and Researched by Mukesh Kumar was released in March 2025 on DocuBay OTT.

== See also ==
- List of serial killers by country
- Crime in India
