= Rosendo Ribeiro =

Portuguese physician and diplomat

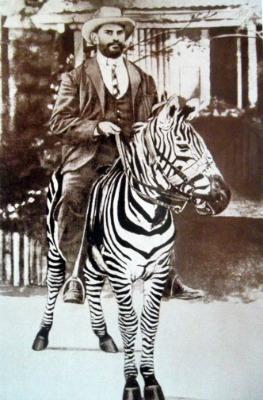
- Ribeiro riding his zebra
- Born: 1871; Goa, Portuguese India
- Died: 2 February 1951 (aged 79–80); London, England
- Occupations: Physician, diplomat

Rosendo Ayres Ribeiro (1871 — 2 February 1951) was a Portuguese physician and diplomat.

== Career ==
Ribeiro arrived in Mombasa in May 1889 and later, as Goa was part of the Portuguese Empire, was entitled Vice-Consul of Portugal in Nairobi.

He was Kenya’s first private medical practitioner and the first to diagnose bubonic plague in this country. Curiously, he used to ride a zebra he tamed to attend his patients' house calls.

Ribeiro is a recipient of the Order of British Empire for the extent of his benevolent works in Kenya.
