= Margaret Toscano =

Indian field hockey player (born 1956)

Personal information
- Nationality: Indian
- Born: 9 February 1956 (age 70) Mumbai, India
- Children: 3 including Marjorie Carvalho

Sport
- Sport: Field hockey
Medal record
Women's field hockey
Representing India
Asian Games
Gold medal – first place	1982 Delhi	Team competition

Margaret Toscano (born 9 February 1956) is an Indian field hockey player. She competed in the women's tournament at the 1980 Summer Olympics.
