= Parag Madkaikar =

Indian cricketer (born 1986)

Parag Mohan Madkaikar (born 22 April 1986 in Bombay) is an all-round Indian cricketer. Parag has represented Mumbai, and played in the winning MCA President's XI vs the touring Sri Lankans on 22 October 2005, at the Wankhede Stadium in Mumbai.

Parag now plays for Hawkinge Cricket Club in the Kent Cricket Feeder League 1D, based near Folkestone, Kent, and is on course to be leading run-scorer in the division in 2008.
