= Edmer Barreto =

Indian writer and theatre director

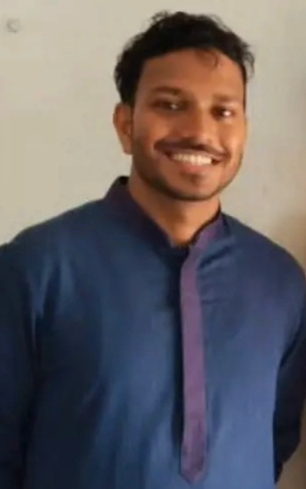
- Barreto in 2024
- Born: September 1, 1997 (age 28); Pilerne, Goa, India
- Education: Goa University
- Occupations: Writer; theatre director; actor; emcee
- Years active: c. 2014–present
- Title: President of Pilerne Arts Socio Sports and Cultural Association
- Writing career
- Language: English
- Period: 2018–2019
- Genre: Romance novel
- Website: barretoedmer.wordpress.com

Edmer Barreto (born 1997 or 1998) is an Indian writer, theatre director, and actor who primarily works on the Konkani stage. He serves as the president of the Pilerne Arts Socio Sports and Cultural Association and is the head of the Pilerne Theatre group.

== Early life ==
Edmer Barreto was born in either 1997 or 1998. He hails from the village of Pilerne. As of 2018, he lives with his parents and elder brother. Barreto completed his graduation from St. Xavier's College and pursued his higher education at Goa University.

== Career ==
On 4 August 2016, a theatrical production titled "Fultem Ful" (Blooming Flower) was staged by the Pilernechim Motiam group in Pilerne. The tiatr, written and directed by Barreto, examined themes of love, jealousy, and forgiveness. The ensemble cast of "Fultem Ful" included performers such as Bliss Fernandes as Shanaya, Saish Daujekar as Saish, Rodney Fernandes as Rodney, Zemario Philip as Mandar, and Meghan Fernandes as Pepsi. Barreto himself played the supporting role of Ryan, Shanaya's brother. Additional supporting cast members included Freeda, Alisha, Ashwin, and Kevin.

The musical component of the production showcased various performances, including solos by Alisha, duets by Kevin and Zemario, a duet by Althea and Zamario, and choral performances featuring Althea, Megan, Freeda, and Anisha. The live music was provided by Vitorino Araujo and his band. The stage design was created by Anil Chari, and Krishna contributed background music.

In September 2017, the theatrical production titled "Nit Konn Ghetolo?" was brought to the stage by Shooting Star, Tivim. Written and directed by Barreto, the tiatr delved into the intricate relationship between individuals involved in both upholding and breaking the law within society. The cast consisted of Saish Daujekar portraying Roy, Bliss Fernandes as Shenaya, Stanny Almeida as PI Alfino, and Alisha Rodrigues as Rosy. Barreto himself took on the supporting role of Ryan, Roy's brother. The comedic elements of the performance were executed by Zemario Philip in the role of a police constable, and Megan Fernandes as Petroshina.

The musical aspect featured performances, including Victoria's solo rendition dedicated to Mother Teresa, a duo by Anisha and Althea, duets by Ashwin and Bliss, Zemario and Alisha, and a quartet featuring Ashwin, Anisha, Stanny, and Althea. Additionally, a choral performance was delivered by Kevin, Zemario, Stanny, and Ashwin. The music for the production was composed by Vitorino Araujo and his team, with assistance from Mohan Khavnekar in creating the background score. The lighting design was under the responsibility of Eddie Barreto, while the stage sets were handled by Midhi Bugde and Freeda Fernandes.

In February 2018, Barreto was selected to join the cast of the tiatr production titled "Comb," a theatrical play written and directed by Fr Luis Gomes and Sandeep Kalangutkar. The ensemble included performers such as Natasha Pereira, Netwin Antao, Stefania Fernandes, Jenica Pereira, David Pereira, Nigel Fernandes, Andrea Marques, Priti Parab, and Akhil Ajgainkar. Barreto portrayed the character of John Baptist, a married man who also worked as a lecturer.

The play featured a band comprising Roy on the saxophone, Dominic on the trumpet, Elton Simoes on the keyboard, and Elton Fernandes on the drums. "Comb" incorporated a diverse range of musical performances, including solos, duos, duets, and chorals. These songs were rendered by a group of vocalists, including Erica, Nigel, Anthony, Malucha, Andrea, Violet, Ashwin, Althea, Annrea, Kingsley, Aestrony, Joynus, David, and Melcia.

On 25 August 2022, Barreto and his ensemble made their inaugural appearance at the annual Pattoleanchem Fest (Feast of Patoleos) held in Madkai, Ponda. This marked their first performance outside their hometown of Pilerne. The production, titled "Xrishti Samballuia", was a theatrical play written and directed by Barreto, featuring a cast of six actors and additional members from the local parish. The performance incorporated traditional musical instruments, such as the ghumott and kottios. Following their debut, they presented the same play on 20 August at the Bonderachim Passoi in Divar.

In October 2022, Barreto performed alongside his Pilerne Theatre group during the debut edition of the Matiechem Fest. The festival, organized by Marius Fernandes and Gwendolyn de Ornelas, took place in collaboration with the residents of Pilerne, within the premises of the St John the Baptist Church precinct in Pilerne.

In November 2022, Barreto was designated as the president of the Pilerne Arts Socio Sports and Cultural Association, assuming leadership of the Zero Waste Pilerne Thursday heritage market. The appointment was made by curators Marius Fernandes and Dr. Gwendolyn De Ornelas.

== Awards ==
In December 2014, Barreto garnered acclaim for his contributions to the tiatr production titled "Sogllim Ek." His scriptwriting skills, as well as his acting and singing abilities, earned him four awards. The play, directed by Netwin Antao, was showcased at the 5th Children Festival organized by the Tiatr Academy of Goa.

== Stage works ==
Year	Title	Role	Notes	Ref
2014	Sogllim Ek		Writer	
2015	Vell Diyat		Assistant director	
2016	Fultem Ful	Ryan	Writer & director	
2017	Nit Konn Ghetolo?	Ryan	Writer & director	
2018	Comb	John Baptist		
2022	Xrishti Samballuia		Writer & director	

== Bibliography ==
- Barreto, Edmer (23 May 2018). CRUSH! You Crushed it. Chennai, Tamil Nadu, India: Notion Press. ISBN 9781643242972.
- Barreto, Edmer (23 October 2019). CRUSH! You Crushed It Again. Chennai, Tamil Nadu, India: Notion Press. ISBN 9781647331504.
