= Indigo 91.9 FM =

Radio Station

Indigo 91.9
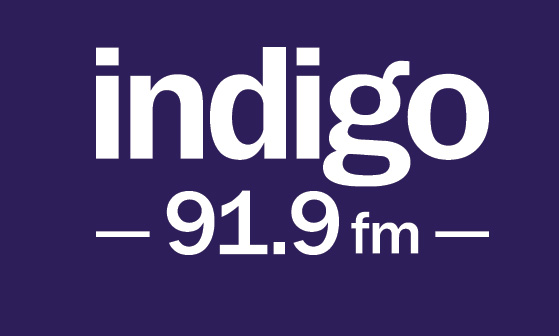
- Bangalore, Karnataka; India
- Broadcast area: Bangalore and Goa, India
- Frequency: 91.9 MHz

Programming
- Language: English
- Format: Adult, Contemporary (Top 40), Pop, hip hop, retro, Rock

Ownership
- Owner: Rajeev Chandrasekhar

History
- First air date: 2007

Technical information
- Transmitter coordinates: 12.925107°N 77.631733°E

Links
- Website: www.indigomusic.com

Indigo 91.9 FM is India's first and longest running international radio network operating in Bangalore and Goa. The channel is a part of Asianxt Digital Technologies which is owned by a Bharatiya Janata Party member of parliament Rajeev Chandrasekhar. The brand is positioned as the radio station for a Fun Young India. The station forayed into other extensions which includes Indigo XP (formerly known as Indigo Live Music Bar) an experiential performance venue in Bangalore, TheIndigoXP.com - the radio station's digital arm, Indigo Live events for large format entertainment festivals and Radio As A Service in premium venues and locations.

Indigo 91.9's journey began in 2006, as a way of channeling the energy and the passion of the rapidly growing youth population. Initially, Indigo 91.9 FM found a place as a channel on WorldSpace Satellite Radio, operating on channel BC 1218 as simply ‘Radio Indigo’. In 2002, Indigo hosted the first of its kind ‘Satellite Dance Party’, as listeners at the event and from all over the country partied to the non-stop dance music being played.

With the second phase of radio licensing, Indigo 91.9 FM got into terrestrial radio and emerged as India's first international music radio station in 2006. ‘Sunrise’ by Norah Jones was the first song that was ever played on air. That song represented a new dawn in radio programming that Indigo 91.9 FM brought about. The radio station grew to be known as ‘the color of music’ with a diverse collection of international music playing and has now evolved as the radio station for a Fun Young Bangalore and Goa. In phase III of licensing, Indigo 91.9FM successfully migrated both their stations, obtaining license until 2030.

== Programming ==
Indigo 91.9 FM plays the contemporary hit radio format, mainly focusing on playing current and recurrent popular music as determined by the top 40 music charts. The channel has hosted several jingle jams, the Indigo and Blues concert, live music under the northern lights and many experiential activations.

Indigo 91.9FM also hosts the Indigo Hot Mix with Bangalore DJs Ivan and Rohit Barker.

Syndicated programming on Indigo 91.9 includes AT40 with Ryan Seacrest, A State of Trance with Armin Van Buuren, and Jacked Radio with Afrojack, Tiesto's Club Life, Hardwell On Air, and Planet Perfecto with Paul Oakenfold.

== Allied Businesses ==
- IndigoXP (formerly known as Indigo Live Music Bar): In 2014, taking their passion for music even further, Indigo 91.9 FM launched Indigo XP, an experiential performance venue located in Koramangala, Bangalore. Indigo XP offers the best dance floor in town, coupled with the best and the latest-in-technology sound and lighting systems sourced from across the globe, it is complemented with the latest laser projectors and LED screen.
- Airport Radio (offering Radio As A Service or RAAS): In 2017, Radio Indigo announced the launch of their niche offering Radio As A Service, partnering with Chandigarh and Goa International airports to exclusively play international music at these airports.
- Mall Radio (offering Radio As A Service or RAAS): in 2018, Radio Indigo announced a partnering with Garuda mall in Bangalore to play international music at the mall called "Garuda mall radio"
- TheIndigoXP.com: In 2016, Indigo also launched their digital arm TheIndigoXP.com. The portal explores different happenings and trends in the spaces of lifestyle, fashion, fitness and music
- Indigo Live Events: Caters to large format event across various genres of music showcasing international and home grown musicians. Over the years, Indigo Live Events has curated events such as the Indigo and Blues Festival, Cirkus Indigo, Neon Nights, Indigo Live Golf Open, The Twilight 10K Run among others.

== Recognition ==
- In 2011, Indigo 91.9 won three awards at The Golden Mikes, two under the category Best On-Ground Promotion for a Client and one for Best Use of Sponsorship
- RJ Michelle, in 2012, was awarded the ‘RJ of the Year’ at that years Golden Mikes.
- In 2014, Indigo 91.9's Morning Show with RJ Michelle and Nathan, won bronze at the Big Bang Awards.
- TheIndigoXP.com, in its first year of operation, bagged the award for Excellence in New Media Initiative at the India Radio Forum Awards 2017.
- In June 2017, Indigo 91.9 FM entered the Limca Book of Records for being the only station to have their RJs form a band and jam live on stage.
- In 2009, Indigo 91.9 created entered the Limca National Record for Lenovo's marketing campaign, where the radio station broadcast LIVE from 20 ft above the ground for the first time
