= Velinga (Veling) =

Village in Ponda, India

Coordinates: 15°26′N 73°58′E

Velinga or Veling is a village in Ponda taluka, Goa. The panchayat (village council) area includes well-known temples, such as the Lord Manguesh Temple. The main occupations are agriculture, horticulture, and homestead gardening (kulagars). There are approximately 35 water springs in the village panchayat.

== Panchayat ==
Veling is part of the Veling-Priol-Kunkoliem Village Panchayat

The village panchayat (village council) that it belongs to—Veling Priol Cuncoliem—is considered an 'A' Class Village Panchayat and covers the three revenue villages mentioned above.

== Location, surroundings ==
The north-eastern part of the village is near the main road through Ponda taluka. The village contains the GEC Infinity Ground, and in close proximity are the Madkai IDC (Industrial Development Corporation) Office, the Shivaji Maharaj Fort at Farmagudi, and a number of prominent temples.

The area is roughly 10 km from the sub-district headquarters, the town of Ponda, and about 20 km from the district headquarters and state capital of Goa, Panaji or Panjim.

== Area, population ==
Per the 2011 Census, Velinga has an area of 315 hectares, with 444 households and a population of 1,921, consisting of 1,001 males and 920 females. The population in the zero-to-six age group was 145 children, of whom 79 were males and 66 females.
