= Shamrao Madkaikar =

Indian politician (1910–2011)

Shamrao Madkaikar

Shamrao Madkaikar (1910 – 24 December 2011) was an Indian independence activist and a leader of Communist Party of India. Madkaikar established the Gomantakiya Tarun Sangh in 1937 at Margão, Portuguese Goa.

In 2010, Chief Minister, Digambar Kamat paid visit to Madkaikar on his 100th birthday. In his regard the CM said, "Madkaikar not only fought for Goa’s Liberation, but work for the State and its people post Liberation."
