= Maria Aurora Couto =

Indian writer and educator (1937–2022)

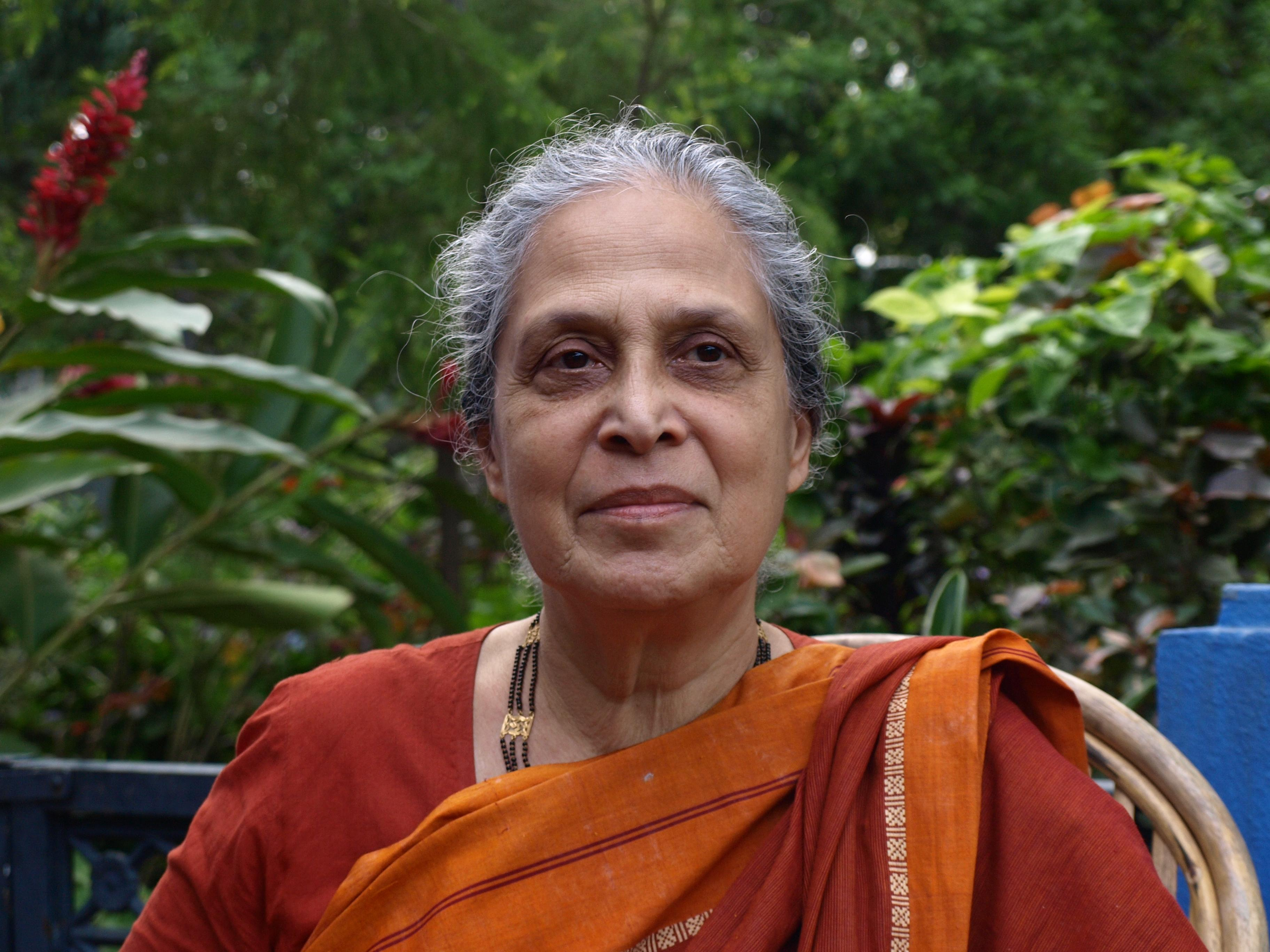
- Couto at her home in Carona, Aldona in 2015
- Born: Maria Aurora Figueiredo; 22 August 1937; Salcete, Goa, Portuguese India
- Died: 14 January 2022 (aged 84)
- Occupations: Writer; educator
- Writing career
- Notable works: Goa: A Daughter's Story; Filomena's Journeys
- Notable awards: Padma Shri (2010)

Maria Aurora Couto (22 August 1937 – 14 January 2022) was an Indian writer and educator best known for promoting literature and ideas in the English language within Goa and beyond. In addition to her books, she wrote for newspapers and magazine, and also taught English literature at Lady Shri Ram College, Delhi and Dhempe College of Panjim. She also helped start the DD Kosambi Festival of Ideas in 2008.

Couto was a recipient of the Padma Shri, India's fourth highest civilian award in 2010.

== Early life ==
Couto was born in Salcette in South Goa on 22 August 1937 to António Caetano Francisco (Chico) de Figueiredo and Maria Quitéria Filomena Borges. Her parents were both natives of the Velhas Conquistas district of Salcette. Both her paternal and maternal origins were from the Roman Catholic Brahmin community of the erstwhile Portuguese Goa and Damaon.

She moved as a child to the neighbouring city of Dharwad, then in the Mysore state, and a centre of education and opportunity for Goans, with her parents and six siblings in an attempt to control her father's alcoholism. Following their father's abandonment of the family, the seven children were raised by their mother as a single parent.

Couto studied at St Joseph's High School and later studied English literature at Karnatak University. In a later interview, she would later recollect that her growing up days were centered around her identity as an Indian, as a Goan, and as a Catholic. The college at the time had students from all over the then Mysore state. Some of her classmates at university included playwright Girish Karnad and author Shashi Deshpande. She later completed her PhD in literature studying religious humanism in the works of François Mauriac.

== Career ==
Couto went on to teach English literature in colleges such as Lady Shri Ram College, Delhi and Dhempe College, Panaji and also contributed to periodicals in India and the United Kingdom.

Couto's writing career began with her 1988 book about English author and literary critic, Graham Greene's works, Graham Greene: On the Frontier, Politics and Religion in the Novels. She had met the writer earlier during his visit to Goa in 1963. Her 2004 book, Goa: A Daughter's Story, was "neither history nor biography" due to its non-factual nature, but her autobiography combined with a description of the lifestyle of the Roman Catholic Brahmin community in Goa. In 2014, Couto released her book Filomena's Journeys, which delves into the life of her mother, Filomena Borges, covering "Goa's dying Catholic elite" as it showed the shift of society and culture in Goa. In this third book she described her father's battles with alcoholism, life in the changing times, and growing up in multicultural India.

As the Chairperson of the DD Kosambi Centenary Committee in 2008, Couto helped initiate the DD Kosambi Festival of Ideas, a lecture series sponsored by Goa's Department of Culture. She was also actively involved with Goa University.

Couto also spoke about environmental issues and on various social justice causes pertaining to her home state of Goa. She spoke against the attacks and vandalism of Catholic crosses in Southern Goa in 2017. She was also a supporter of the Goenchi Mati Movement, a people's movement that protested the mining activities in Goa. Couto was amongst writers who asked the Sahitya Akademi to condemn actions including the M. M. Kalburgi killing and other violence in the country in 2015.

Couto was awarded the Padma Shri, India's fourth highest Indian civilian award, by the Government of India in 2010.

== Personal life and death ==
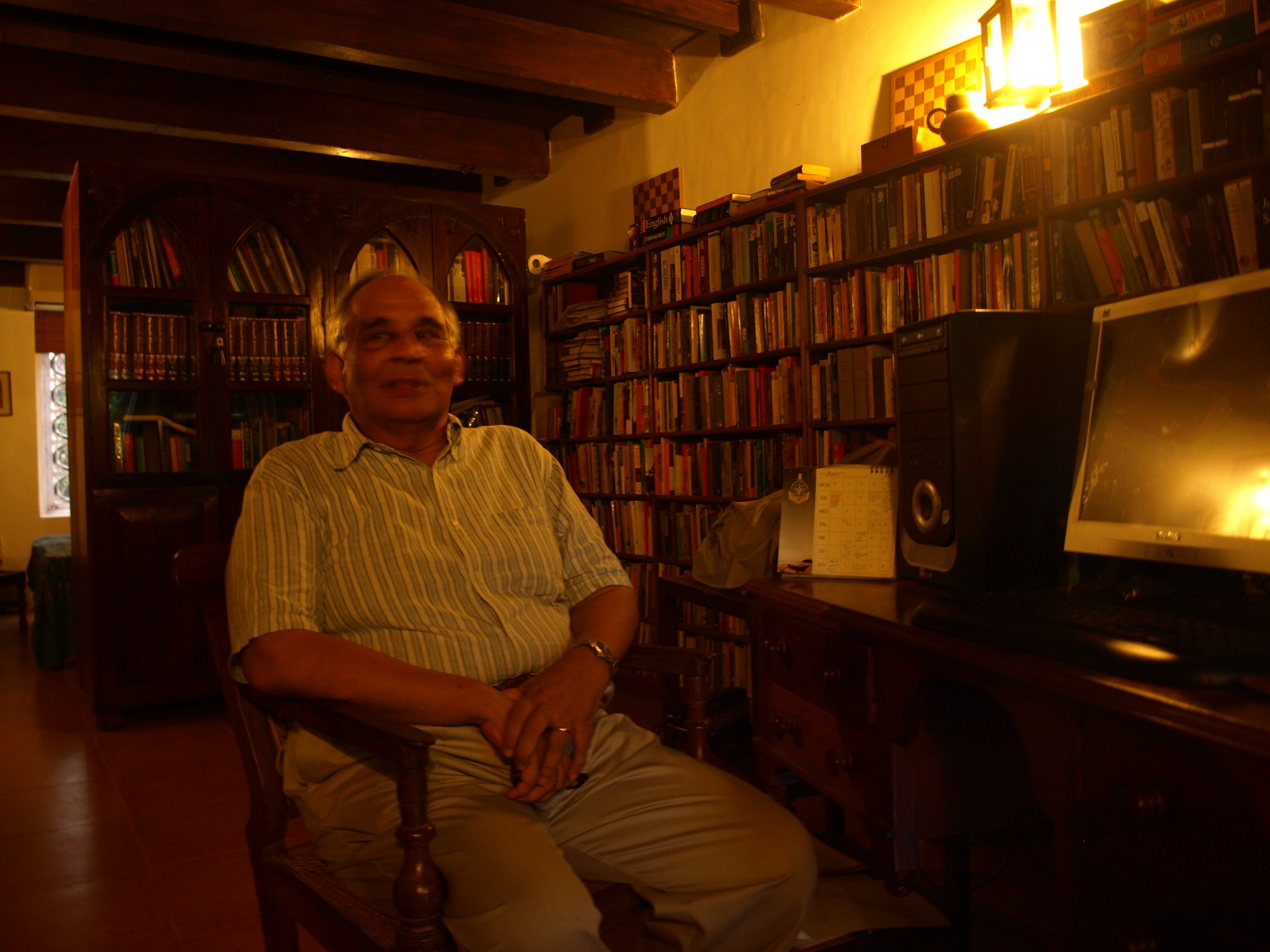
Alban Couto, former adviser to the Governor of Goa, and senior government bureaurat, at his study in Aldona

During her stay in Mumbai, Maria Aurora Figueiredo met an Indian civil administrator of Goan origin named Albano Francisco Couto. They got married in 1961 and had three children together. Due to the nature of her husband's work, the family would travel and live in different parts of India, as well as other countries. The couple initially planned to retire in Chennai, before finally choosing to live in her husband's ancestral house in Aldona, Goa. Couto enjoyed listening to South African jazz and was passionate about films, having started a film club when she was a teacher. Albano Couto died in June 2009.

Maria Couto died of pneumonia on 14 January 2022 at the age of 84.

== Works ==
Works by Couto include:

- Couto, Maria (1988). Graham Greene: On the Frontier: Politics and Religion in the Novels. London: Macmillan. ISBN 9780333443460.
- Couto, Maria (2004). Goa: A Daughter's Story. Penguin Books India. ISBN 978-0-14-303343-1.
- Pereira, A. B. de Braganca (2008). Ethnography of Goa, Daman and Diu. Penguin UK. ISBN 978-93-5118-208-5. (a translation of Etnografia da India Portuguesa by A.B. Braganza Pereira from Portuguese)
- Couto, Maria (2013). Filomena's Journeys: A Portrait of a Marriage, a Family & a Culture. Aleph Book Company. ISBN 978-93-82277-04-0.
