= Rina Khan =

Bangladeshi film actress

- রিনা খান
- Occupation: Actress

Rina Khan is a Bangladeshi film actress. She is known for acting in negative roles. She appeared in about 600 movies.

== Biography ==
Khan's real name is Selima Sultana. She made her debut in Dhallywood with Sohag Milon which was released in 1982. Although she primarily appeared as the antagonist in some films, she played the part of the protagonist in others. She appeared with Shakib Khan in Sohanur Rahman Sohan's romance Ananta Bhalobasha in 1999, which marked Khan's on-screen first appearance. Her latest film Hashibur Reza Kallol's tragic romance Swatta, also with Khan, which won numerous accolades including five National Film Awards in several categories including Khan's fourth Best Actor award at the 42 National Film Awards, six Bachsas Awards and two Meril-Prothom Alo Awards.

Khan is married to Altaf Hossain Kajol. Together they have two sons.

== Selected filmography ==
- Sohag Milon (1982)
- Sobuj Sathi (1982)
- Prem Jamuna
- Megh Bizli Badol
- Mahanayak (1985)
- Shoshurbari Zindabad (2002)
- Porena Chokher Polok
- Er Beshi Bhalobasha Jay Na (2013)
- 16 Ana Prem (2017)
- Daag Hridoye
- Swatta (2017)
- Amar Sesh Kotha (2025)
