= Nasreen (actress) =

Bangladeshi actress

- Born: Nasrin Akter Nargis; 13 May 1982 (age 44); Dhaka, Bangladesh
- Occupations: actress, producer
- Years active: 1996–2017
- Notable work: Swatta
- Spouse: Mustafizur Rahman Riyel (m. 2012)
- Children: Afrin (daughter); Rizon (son)
- Awards: Bachsas Award (1st time)

Nasreen Akter Nargis (born 13 May 1982) is a former Bangladeshi film actress who mainly played supporting roles. She made her debut in Sohanur Rahman Sohan's film Love in 1992. The same year, her film Agnishapath was also released. In 2019, it was announced that a biopic would be made to honor her career and achievements.

== Career ==
Nasreen made her debut in the 1992 film Love, followed by Agnishapath. She was often seen playing girl-next-door characters, vamps, heroines' best friends, and comedic roles. She was popularly paired with actor Dildar. They appeared in many successful films as a comic team. After Dildar's death, she started appearing alongside Kabila and Afzal Sharif in comic roles and as their love interest. In 2017, she played a prostitute in Hashibur Reza Kallol's Swatta, co-starring Shakib Khan. The film won numerous accolades, including five National Film Awards in several categories. Khan won his fourth Best Actor award at the 42 National Film Awards. The film also received six Bachsas Awards, including Nasreen's first Best Supporting Actress award, and two Meril-Prothom Alo Awards.

== Personal life ==
Nasreen married businessman Mustafizur Rahman Riyel in 2012. Together they have a son and a daughter. After marriage, she retired from acting permanently. She appears on a lot of interviews.

== Selected filmography ==
- Love (1992)
- Agnishapath (1992)
- Raag Anurag (1994)
- Tumi Amar (1994) - Nasreen
- Bichar Hobe (1996) - Hashi
- Shopner Prithibi (1996) - Hazera
- Priyojon (1996) - Gendi
- Jibon Songsar (1996) - Lata
- Ruti (1996)
- Shudhu Tumi (1997) - Alomoti
- Matribhumi (1998)
- Shanto Keno Mastan (1998)
- Premer Tajmohol (2001) - cameo
- Abbajan (2001)
- Boba Khuni (2002)
- O Priya Tumi Kothay (2002)
- Shasti (2004)
- Meher Nigar (2005)
- Phuler Moto Bou (2006)
- Pitar Ashon (2006)
- Hridoyer Kotha (2006)
- Amar Praner Swami (2007)
- Ulta Palta 69 (2007)
- Sontan Amar Sontan (2008)
- Tumi Swapno Tumi Sadhona (2008)
- Akash Chhowa Bhalobasha (2008) - item song
- Eri Naam Bhalobasha (2008)
- Mon Bosena Porar Tabile (2009)
- Sobar Upore Tumi (2009)
- Ebadot (2009)
- Amar Praner Priya (2009)
- Top Hero (2010)
- Khodar Pore Maa (2012)
- Bhalobashar Rong (2012) - Nasreen
- Nishpap Munna (2013) - Pasha's sister
- Prem Prem Paglami (2013)
- Ek Jobaner Jomidar Here Gelen Eibar (2016)
- Swatta (2017) - Rita
- Ananda Ashru (2026)
