= Tor Premete =

2017 song by James

Single by Bappa Mazumder featuring James

from the album Swatta (Original Motion Picture Soundtrack)
- Language: Bengali
- English title: I'm Blinded by Your Love
- Released: 30 March 2017
- Recorded: 3 August 2014
- Studio: Taranga Entertainment
- Genre: Dhallywood; soundtrack; Latin; world; pop
- Length: 5:12
- Label: Qinetic Network
- Songwriters: Sohani Hossain; Bappa Mazumder
- Producer: Bappa Mazumder

Music video
- "Tor Premete" on YouTube

"Tor Premete" also known songs first stanza as "Tor Premete Ondho Holam" (Bengali: তোর প্রেমেতে অন্ধ হলাম, transl. I'm Blinded by Your Love) is a National Award-winning song from the 2017 Bangladeshi romantic-drama film Swatta sung by James. The song composed by Bappa Mazumder and choreographed by Masum Babul. The lyrics of the song written by Sohani Hossain, the producer and story writer of the film, and Shakib Khan and Paoli Dam performed in the song. The song was released on Deco's YouTube channel under the banner of Qinetic Network on 30 March 2017.

For the song Sohani Hossain won the Global Music Awards for Best Lyricist in 2018, and James won the National Film Awards, the Meril Prothom Alo Awards and the Bachsas Awards in the Best Male Singer category. The song placed number 1 in the List of the Top 50 songs by ABC Radio in 2017, and it was ranked number 3 on the "Top 10 Bengali Songs Listened to YouTube in 2017" by The Daily Star.

== Background ==
The song is sung James and composed by Bappa Mazumder. James recorded the song on 3 August 2014, under the banner of Qinetic Network.

== Song credits ==
The song credits mentioned in the official music video's description of the song Tor Premete on YouTube are,

== Release and response ==
The song was released on Deco's YouTube channel under the banner of Qinetic Network on 30 March 2017. As of 30 August 2017 the song has been viewed more than 10 million.

== Accolades ==
- The song placed number 1 in the List of the Top 50 songs by ABC Radio in 2017.
- The song was ranked number 3 on the "Top 10 Bengali Songs Listened to YouTube in 2017" by The Daily Star.

The song received several awards in the category of best lyricist, music director and singer. The list is given below:

Events	Date of Events	Category	Nominee	Results	Ref
Meril Prothom Alo Awards	30 March 2018	Best Male Singer	James	Won	
Global Music Awards	16 November 2018	Best lyricist	Sohani Hossain	Won	
Bachsas Awards	5 April 2019	Best Music Director	Bappa Mazumder	Won	
Bachsas Awards	5 April 2019	Best Male Singer	James	Won	
National Film Awards	8 December 2019	Best Male Singer	James	Won	
