= National Film Award for Best Konkani Feature Film =

Indian film award

- Description: Best Konkani feature film of the year
- Sponsored by: National Film Development Corporation of India
- Formerly called: National Film Award for Best Feature Film in Konkani (1965–2021)
- Rewards: Rajat Kamal (Silver Lotus); ₹2,00,000
- First award: 1965
- Most recent winner: Kaajro (2019)

The National Film Award for Best Konkani Feature Film is one of the National Film Awards presented annually by the National Film Development Corporation of India. It is one of several awards presented for feature films and awarded with Rajat Kamal (Silver Lotus). Since the 70th National Film Awards, the name was changed to "Best Konkani Feature Film".

The National Film Awards, established in 1954, are the most prominent film awards in India that merit the best of the Indian cinema. The ceremony also presents awards for films in various regional languages.

Awards for films in seven regional language (Bengali, Hindi, Kannada, Malayalam, Marathi, Tamil and Telugu) started from 2nd National Film Awards which were presented on December 21, 1955. Three awards of "President's Silver Medal for Best Feature Film", "Certificate of Merit for the Second Best Feature Film" and "Certificate of Merit for the Third Best Feature Film" were instituted. The later two certificate awards were discontinued from 15th National Film Awards (1967).

Till now, it has been awarded four times at 52nd National Film Awards in 2004, 54th National Film Awards in 2006 and lately in 57th National Film Awards in 2009. There was no separate category for Konkani at the 13th Awards, and Nirmon was awarded under the Marathi category. Per Constitution of India, Konkani language is among the languages specified in the Schedule VIII of the Constitution.

== Winners ==
Award includes 'Rajat Kamal' (Silver Lotus Award) and cash prize. Following are the award winners over the years:

Awards legends
*	President's Silver Medal for Best Feature Film
*	Certificate of Merit for the Second Best Feature Film
*	Certificate of Merit for the Third Best Feature Film
*	Certificate of Merit for the Best Feature Film

List of films, showing the year (award ceremony), producer(s) and director(s)
Year	Film(s)	Producer(s)	Director(s)	Refs.
1965 (13th)	Nirmon	Frank Fernand	A. Salam	
2004 (52nd)	Aleesha	Rajendra Talak Creations	Rajendra Talak	
2006 (54th)	Antarnad	Rajendra Talak Creations	Rajendra Talak	
2009 (57th)	Paltadacho Munis	NFDC	Laxmikant Shetgaonkar	
2013 (61st)	Baga Beach	Sharvani Productions	Laxmikant Shetgaonkar	
2014 (62nd)	Nachom-ia Kumpasar	Goa Folklore Productions	Bardroy Barretto	
2015 (63rd)	Enemy	A.D. Prasad	Dinesh Bhonsle	
2016 (64th)	K Sera Sera - Ghodpachen Ghoddtelem	de Goan Studio	Rajeev Shinde	
2018 (66th)	Amori	Opus Ga La	Dinesh Bhonsle	
2019 (67th)	Kaajro	de Goan Studio	Nitin Bhaskar	
2024 (72nd)	Mog Asum	Flowing Mandovi Films, R S Creations and Kathputlee Arts and Films	Radheshyam Pipalwa and Agnelo Angelo Braganza	
