= Juze =

2017 Indian film in Konkani

- Poster of the film
- Directed by: Miransha Naik
- Written by: Miransha Naik
- Produced by: Miransha Naik; Thierry Lenouvel; Derk-Jan Warrink
- Starring: Rushikesh Naik; Sudesh Bhise; Prashanti Talpankar; Barkha Naik; Gauri Kamat
- Cinematography: Abhiraj Rawale
- Edited by: Jacques Comets; Siddesh Naik; Suzana Pedro
- Music by: Pierre Aviat
- Release date: 16 April 2017 (Hong Kong International Film Festival)
- Running time: 93 minutes
- Country: India
- Language: Konkani

Juze or Juje is a 2017 Indian film in Konkani, written and directed by Miransha Naik. The film is about the social injustice and exploitation faced by migrant labourers in Goa, and is set in the 1990s. It was co-produced by people from India, France and Netherlands (Thin Air, Three Rivers, Kepler Films, Cine-Sud Promotion) under the banner of Goa Film Bazaar, with some of the editing done in Paris.

The film premiered at the Hong Kong International Film Festival in April 2017, and was also chosen for the Karlovy Vary Film Festival. It became the first Konkani film to be commercially released in France. Juze also became the first Konkani film to be selected for mentoring and promotion during Film Bazaar, the filmmaking lab organised by National Film Development Corporation (NFDC) in Goa, in 2015. It was featured at the Mumbai Film Festival in October 2017, at the 48th International Film Festival of India (IFFI) in the Indian Panorama section in November 2017, the Minsk Film Festival in Belarus (where it won an award) and the Dublin International Film Festival in Ireland. The film was finally released in Goa, with an "A" certification by the Central Board of Film Certification (CBFC), in April 2018.

== Plot ==
The story is set in the 1990s. Santosh (Rushikesh Naik) is a teenage boy studying in Class X. He lives in a slum in Borimol village with his grandmother, referred to as Tai (played by Prashanti Talpankar; Tai translates to "aunt"). It is revealed that Tai's son, Santosh's father, had killed Santosh's mother and had been arrested, leaving Tai and Santosh to fend for themselves. Thus, despite being native Goans, they are forced to live with other migrants from poorer parts of the country and work for Juze (Sudesh Bhise). With his business of manufacturing cashew feni and his political connections (which consist of the local politician), Juze terrorizes the whole village, even going so far as to physically abuse and rape the women.

Santosh is an intelligent boy and scores well in class. He frequently skips work to go to school. This frequently gets him in trouble with Juze, who often beats him up publicly. Juze's wife Maria (Gauri Kamat) recognizes Santosh's intelligence and demands that he help her son, who is weak in studies. She also forces him to perform sexual favours for her. Meanwhile, Santosh has a budding romance with his classmate, Maya (Barkha Naik). However, their relationship slowly breaks apart when she realizes the helplessness of his situation. All of this ultimately leads to Santosh confronting Juze with a friend and beating him to death. Santosh then runs away from the village, and is seen waiting tables at a beachside shack.

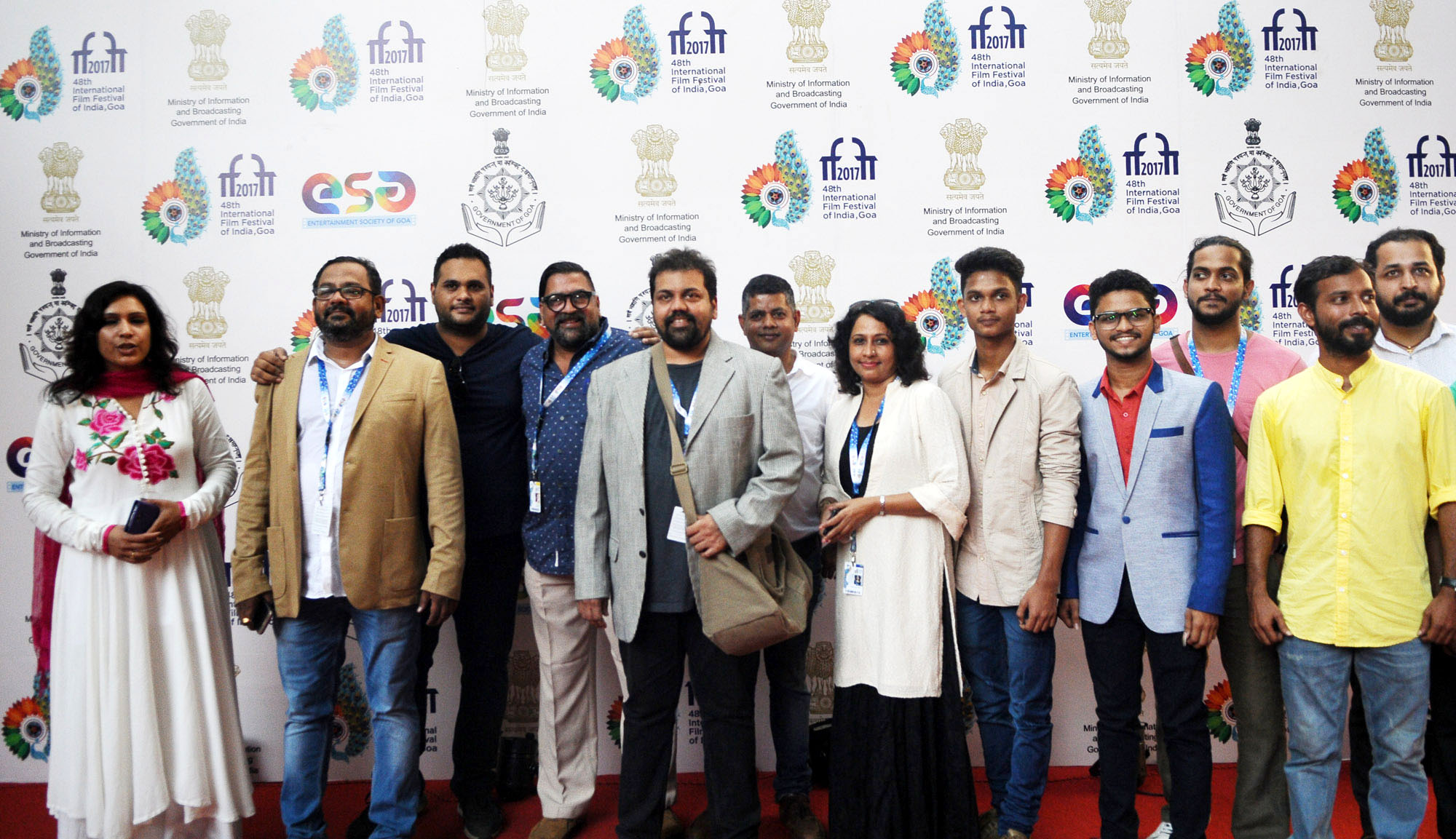
Film crew at IFFI (2016)

== Cast ==
- Rushikesh Naik as Santosh
- Prashanti Talpankar as Tai, Santosh's grandmother
- Sudesh Bhise as Juze
- Gauri Kamat as Maria, Juze's wife
- Barkha Naik as Maya

== Production ==
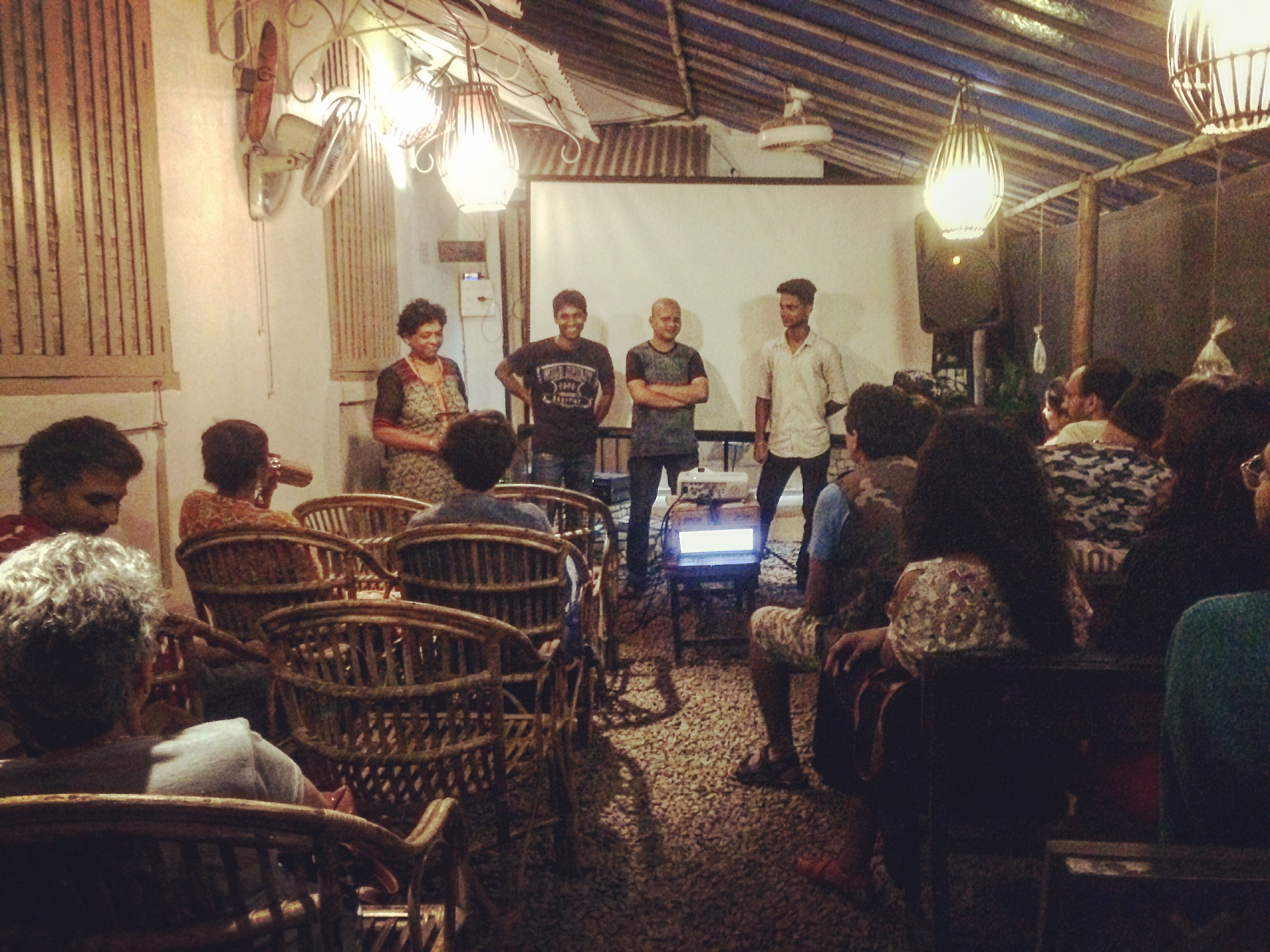
Juze Film crew interaction with audience

The film is partially based on writer-director Miransha Naik's childhood experiences. The film is set in the 90s, making the character Santosh the same age as Miransha was then. The film is also set in Naik's hometown of Borimol village. He admits that some of the events and characters have been adapted from real life. He named the movie after the villain as he found it unique. He believes that the events revolve around Juze, and even though the movie is about Santosh's journey, it simultaneously portrays the downfall of Juze.

It may be noted that Naik lost both his parents to illness at the age of 9. He grew up in Borimol along with his grandmother and two sisters, coming third in his Class X exams. He dropped out within a year of joining the BCom course at Government College, Quepem, to contribute to his household by working as a waiter. His grandmother died when he was 19, and he had to take responsibility of the marriages of his two sisters. By waiting tables for nearly five years, he made enough money to set up his own beachside shack, named Blue Corner, on Benaulim Beach. Two scenes in Juze show the village children watching Subhash Ghai's Karz and Hero, which is reminiscent of Naik and his young friends and his love for movies.

Initially, Naik chose a Mumbai-based actor for the role of Juze's wife, Maria, as he wasn't confident that local artistes would be up to a role with a number of sex scenes. However, the chosen actor couldn't perform because of her language barrier. Naik then turned to Gauri Kamat upon many recommendations, and after some initial hesitation, she agreed to play the part. However, by late 2015, they faced an even bigger problem: shortage of funds even before post-production. It was then that Naik thought of National Film Development Corporation’s annual "Film Bazaar", where it attracted the attention of noted producer Olivia Stewart, who procured funds from the Netherlands-based production company Keplerfilm and the France-based production company of Cine-Sud Promotions. Christian Jeune, who is famous as a scout for Cannes Film Festival, was also impressed with the film's idea, and the film almost made it to Cannes’ Un Certain Regard selection.

The film shows all the interesting developments (including that of his relationship with Maria and Maya) through clever and subtle camerawork, including a series of tracking shots, portraying how Santosh nonchalantly sees all this as a part of his daily life.

== Reception ==
=== Critical response ===
The film was well received by critics for portraying the lesser-known culture and exploitation of the poorer classes taking place in Goa (which is otherwise portrayed very glamorously in films).

Clarence Tsui of The Hollywood Reporter called the film a "contemplative and topical debut, with a story offering mostly heartbreak but also a faint glimpse of hope." Nikki Baughan of ScreenDaily wrote, "Juze may be an exploration of an existence which is endured, rather than lived, but there’s no trace of melodrama or didacticism."

Notably, Juze was screened at the Hong Kong International Film Festival, the Karlovy Vary Film Festival, the Mumbai Film Festival, the International Film Festival of India, the Minsk Film Festival and the Dublin International Film Festival.

== Awards ==
- Special Jury Award at Minsk Film Festival, 2017 (director, Miransha Naik)

== See also ==
- Konkani cinema
- Paltadacho Munis
- Nachom-ia Kumpasar
