= Paoli Dam =

Indian actress

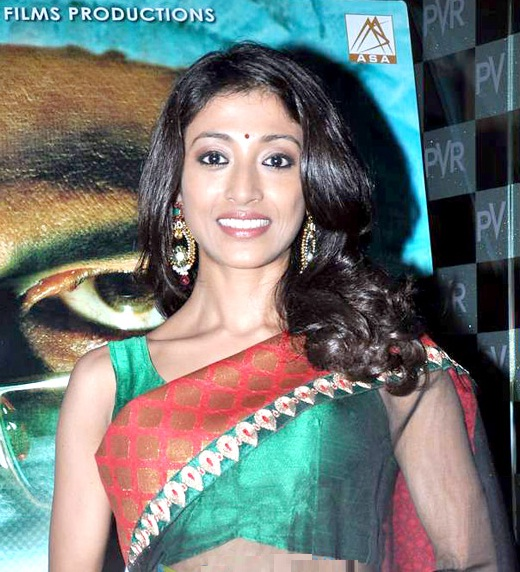
- Dam in 2013
- Born: 1980 (age 45–46); Calcutta, West Bengal, India
- Education: University of Calcutta
- Occupation: Actress
- Years active: 2003–present
- Notable work: Kaalbela (2009); Hate Story (2012); Elar Char Adhyay (2012); Natoker Moto (2015); Bulbbul (2020)
- Spouse: Arjun Deb (m. 2017)

Paoli Dam (born 1980) is an Indian actress who started her career with the Bengali television serial Jibon Niye Khela (2003). She then worked in Bengali television serials such as Tithir Atithi and Sonar Harin; the former ran for six years on ETV Bangla. Dam spent her childhood in Kolkata, earning a postgraduate degree in chemistry from Rajabazar Science College. Initially, she wanted to become a chemical researcher or a pilot. Her debut Bengali film—Teen Yaari Katha, directed by Sudeshna Roy and Abhijit Guha—began in 2004, but was not released until 2012. Dam's first film release was Agnipariksha, directed by Ravi Kinagi. Between 2006 and 2009, she appeared in five Bengali films, coming into prominence with the 2009 Kaalbela, directed by Goutam Ghose.

In 2011, she received international recognition for her role in the Bengali film Chatrak. The film was screened at the Cannes Film Festival and also at film festivals in Toronto and the U.K. In 2012, Dam made her Bollywood debut in Hate Story and also appeared in Vikram Bhatt's Ankur Arora Murder Case, directed by Sohail Tatari. She won the Viewers' Choice Award for Best Actress for her performance in Natoker Moto at the Hyderabad Bengali Film Festival in 2016.

== Early life and education ==
Dam was born in Kolkata, West Bengal to a Bengali family, which is originally from Faridpur (now in Bangladesh). Her father and mother are Amol and Papiya Dam respectively. She also has a brother, Mainak.

Dam attended Loreto School in Bowbazar, before passing her Higher Secondary Examination. She was a good student, winning scholarships. Dam was admitted to Vidyasagar College , affiliated with the University of Calcutta, graduating with a degree in chemistry. She earned a postgraduate degree in chemistry from the Rajabazar Science College Campus of the University of Calcutta.

She learnt classical dance and was also interested in theater from an early age, but she never aspired to become an actor.

== Career ==
=== Television career ===
Dam began her acting career in Bengali television serials. In 2003, she appeared in Jibon Niye Khela, for Zee Bangla and later in the ETV Bangla serial Tithir Atithi, directed by Jishu Dasgupta; the latter ran for six years. The actress also appeared in Tarpor Chand Uthlo, Sonar Harin and Jaya. Dam has said that she has learned a great deal from Bengali television, and it groomed her for a film career.

=== 2006–2008 ===
Dam's debut Bengali film Teen Yaari Katha, (directed by Sudeshna Roy and Abhijit Guha), began in 2004, but was not released until 2012. Her first film release was Agnipariksha (2006). The film was directed by Ravi Kinagi and produced by Debendra Kuchar; Dam played a supporting role. The actress next appeared in Tulkalam (2007), directed by Haranath Chakraborty and produced by Pijush Saha. Mithun Chakraborty and Rachana Banerjee played the lead male and female characters, respectively. Dam's third Bengali film release was I Love You, in which she had a supporting role as the heroine's friend. In 2008 the actress appeared in the Bengali film Hochheta Ki, a comedy of errors directed by Basu Chatterjee, in which Dam played a Bengali housewife.

=== 2009–2011 ===
In 2009 Dam appeared in seven Bengali films, and came into focus with the success of Kaalbela (directed by Goutam Ghose). Based on a Bengali novel by Samaresh Majumdar, the film's background was the Naxalite movement of the 1980s. Dam played Madhabilata, the girlfriend of a young Naxalite leader, and her performance was praised. In its review, The Times of India appreciated: "Pauli, who plays Madhabilata with such integrity that the pain in her eyes and the romance in her voice charms viewers to believe that she has it in her to lend her face to everything that Madhabilita has epitomised". In an interview, Dam said the film was a "turning point" in her career: "Everybody needs a platform – Kalbela gave me the platform. I had to prove myself". Her other six films released that year were Hochchheta ki, directed by Basu Chatterjee; Jamai Raja, directed by Swapan Saha; Box No. 1313; Mallick Bari; Shob Charitro Kalponik, directed by Rituparno Ghosh and Tinmurti.

In 2010, Dam appeared in eleven Bengali films, including Tara (directed by Bratya Basu), Takhan Teish (directed by Atanu Ghosh), Moner Manush (directed by Goutam Ghose), Kagojer Bou (directed by Bappaditya Bandyopadhyay) and Banshiwala (directed by Anjan Das); five of the eleven are unreleased. Moner Manush was Dam's second film with Ghose; in this film she played Komli, a Baul. In its review, The Times of India found Dam making "sincere efforts in portraying the role of Kamli". The actress later said in an interview that she learned a great deal from working with Ghose.

In 2011, Dam appeared in Chatrak, directed by the Sri Lankan Vimukthi Jayasundara. The actress played Paoli, a Bengali girl, and the film triggered controversy in India when an explicit unsimulated no-body-double sex scene with Dam and Anubrata Basu was leaked on the Internet.

=== 2012–present ===
In 2012, Dam's first Hindi film Hate Story was released; she also appeared in three Bengali films: Bedroom (directed by Mainak Bhaumik), Elar Char Adhyay (directed by Bappaditya Bandyopadhyay) and Teen Yaari Katha (the actress' first film appearance, directed by Sudeshna Roy and Abhijit Guha). Bedroom's story line revolved around the lives of Kolkata urban couples; Dam played Priyanka, a bored and irritable housewife. Elar Char Adhyay was based on Rabindranath Tagore's literary work Char Adhyay, and was set in British Raj India during the 1940s. Dam played Ela, teacher of a group fighting for Indian independence. Her acting was praised; The Indian Express found Dam's characterization of Ela "wonderful" and The Times of India wrote: "Those who thought Paoli's "Hate Story" outing was all about being bold will be pleasantly surprised by her sheer maturity in reinterpreting boldness in the context of an era long left behind". In Teen Yaari Katha, the actress played a supporting role.

Dam also appeared in Mainak Bhaumik's Family Album. The film, also starring Swastika Mukherjee, deals with an MMS scandal.

In 2014, Dam acted in Chaya Manush. In the film, directed by Arindam De, she played Trisha, a journalist. Later that year, Dam acted in Obhishopto Nighty (cursed nighty), directed by Birsa Dasgupta. Dam played the character of Miss Monica, a Bengali bar singer of the 1980s in the comedy-romantic film. Dam said that she was initially reluctant to accept the role, but later realised that it was a "love story". Her next releases were the drama film Sada Canvas and the romantic comedy Hercules, directed by Abhijit Guha and Sudeshna Roy. Dam described her character in Hercules, Minu, as "practical, grounded and not driven by emotions". Her first 2015 release was Anjan Das' Ajana Batash, in which she played Deepa, who works in an ad agency in Kolkata, "lost in depression amongst all the affluence".

Dam's upcoming films include Debesh Chattopadhyay's Natoker Moto - Like a Play which, according to Dam, was a "fictional biopic of a famous actress of the Bengali stage during the 1970s", Auroni Taukhon by Saurav Chakraborty, which is a love story set against the background of communal riots, and Swarup Ghosh's rom-com Tobuo Aparichito.

=== Bollywood career ===
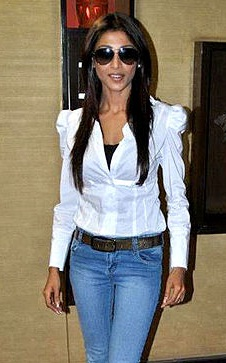
Dam at the launch party for Hate Story, her debut Bollywood film

In 2012, Dam made her Bollywood debut in Hate Story, directed by Vivek Agnihotri and produced by Vikram Bhatt. The film had female protagonists; Dam played Kavyah Krishna, a sex worker. In the film, she and her friend Vicky pull off a caper against one of India's biggest business tycoons.

Dam's performance in this film received a lukewarm response. The Times of India in its review:

Paoli Dam doesn't disappoint one bit on the latter aspect, she is not bad in terms of her acting abilities either. She doesn't incite the pathos that one could fervently feel for her character's plight. But though her act is not accomplished, she manages to pull off her role quite well.

After the film's commercial success, producer Vikram Bhatt planned a sequel, in which Dam was replaced by Surveen Chawla.

After Hate Story, Dam appeared in Vikram Bhatt's next film Ankur Arora Murder Case. The film, directed by Sohail Tatari, is based on the true story of a young boy who died in an operating room due to medical negligence. Dam plays a lawyer fighting for justice. In an interview, she described her role: "It's something very real and close to life and it's a de-glamourised role. It's something that I really enjoyed playing". After attending a special screening of the film in Mumbai, Indian film critic and journalist Taran Adarsh called Dam and said that she should work more in Bollywood.

Dam performed an item number in the 2014 comedy-horror film Gang of Ghosts, directed by Satish Kaushik.

Dam is scheduled to appear in the Hindi film Yaara Silly Silly, directed by Subhash Sehgal. As of April 2013, she will also appear in Ashuu Trikha's thriller Jee Jaan Se (with Kay Kay Menon and Raveena Tandon) as a homemaker whose life is shattered after the death of her husband. According to a 25 April 2013 article in The Times of India, after working in two Vikram Bhatt films, Dam has been offered a third (also a thriller).

== Other films ==
In 2012, Dam began working on the Konkani film Baga Beach, directed by Laxmikant Shetgaonkar. The actress said in an interview: "I like working in different kinds of films. I met Laxmikant Shetgaonkar at the Cannes film festival in 2011 and later heard his script for Baga Beach and liked it. I thought it would be a very unique experience working in a Konkani film. And I thought 15 to 20 days of commitment to a film is not much to give". In 2017, she made her Bangladeshi with Hashibur Reza Kallol's tragic romance Swatta, in which she played a prostitute co-starring with Shakib Khan. The film won numerous accolades including five National Film Awards in several categories including Khan's fourth Best Actor award at the 42 National Film Awards, six Bachsas Awards and two Meril-Prothom Alo Awards.

== Filmography ==
Key
Denotes films that have not yet been released

Year	Film	Director	Roles(s)	Language	Note
2006	Agnipariksha	Rabi Kinagi	Pooja	Bengali	
2007	Tulkalam	Haranath Chakraborty		Bengali	
2007	I Love You	Rabi Kinagi	Borsha (Pooja's friend)	Bengali	
2008	Aamar Pratigya	Swapan Saha	Anjali Ray	Bengali	
2008	Hochchheta ki	Basu Chatterjee	Priya	Bengali	
2009	Kaalbela	Gautam Ghosh	Madhabilata	Bengali	
2009	Jamai Raja	Swapan Saha		Bengali	
2009	Box No. 1313	Aniruddha Bhattacharya		Bengali	
2009	Mallick Bari	Anirban Chakraborty, P. J. Joseph	Purnima	Bengali	
2009	Shob Charitro Kalponik	Rituparno Ghosh	Kajori Roy	Bengali	
2009	Tinmurti	Raja Sen	Debolina	Bengali	
2010	Thana Theke Aschi	Saran Dutta	Sandhya Mondol	Bengali	
2010	Tara	Bratya Basu	Madhuja	Bengali	
2010	Takhan Teish	Atanu Ghosh	Mohini	Bengali	
2010	Mati O Manush			Bengali	
2010	Kagojer Bou	Bappaditya Bandyopadhyay	Preiti	Bengali	
2010	Hurumtaal		Twinkle	Bengali	
2010	Banshiwala	Anjan Das	Nipa	Bengali	
2010	Bangla Banchao	Anup Sengupta		Bengali	
2010	Moner Manush	Gautam Ghose	Komli	Bengali	
2011	Ajob Prem Ebong...	Arindam Dey	Moyna	Bengali	
2011	Someday Somewhere... Jete Pari Chole	Sanghamitra Chowdhury	Ruu	Bengali	
2011	Chatrak	Vimukthi Jayasundara	Paoli	Bengali	
2011	Bangla Bachao	Anup Sengupta	Mandira	Bengali	
2012	Bedroom	Mainak Bhaumik	Priyanka	Bengali	
2012	Teen Yaari Katha	Sudeshna Roy, Abhijit Guha		Bengali	
2012	Hate Story	Vivek Agnihotri	Kavyah Krishnan	Hindi	
2012	Elar Char Adhyay	Bappaditya Bandyopadhyay	Ela	Bengali	
2013	Hoi Choi	Debarati Gupta	Piyal	Bengali	
2013	Sweetheart	Arup Bhanja	Mimi	Bengali	
2013	Promotion	Snhasish Chakraborty	Shuja	Bengali	
2013	Ankur Arora Murder Case	Suhail Tatari	Kajori Sen	Hindi	
2013	Family Album	Mainak Bhaumik		Bengali	
2013	Baga Beach	Laxmikant Shetgaonkar	Sobha	Konkani	
2014	Chaya Manush	Arindam Mamdo De	Trisha	Bengali	
2014	Obhishopto Nighty	Birsa Dasgupta	Miss Monica	Bengali	
2014	Gang of Ghosts	Satish Kaushik	item girl	Hindi	
2014	Sada Canvas	Subrata Sen	Rupa	Bengali	
2014	Hercules	Sudeshna Roy and Abhijit Guha	Minu	Bengali	
2014	Parapaar	Sanjoy Nag	Urmila	Bengali	
2015	Ajana Batas	Anjan Das	Deepa	Bengali	
2015	Tobuo Aparichito	Swarup Ghosh	Akansha	Bengali	
2015	Auroni Taukhon	Saurav Chakraborty	Auroni	Bengali	
2015	Natoker Moto	Debesh Chattopadhyay	Kheya	Bengali	
2015	Yaara Silly Silly	Subhash Sehgal	Mallika a.k.a. Devanshi S Roy	Hindi	
2016	Zulfiqar	Srijit Mukherjee	Karishma Ahmed	Bengali	
2016	Khawto	Kamaleshwar Mukherjee	Damayanti Chakraborty/Antara	Bengali	
2017	Swatta	Hashibur Reza Kallol	Shikha	Bengali	Bangladeshi film
2017	Maacher Jhol	Pratim D. Gupta	Sreela	Bengali	
2017	Devi	Rick Basu	Devi	Bengali	
2018	Maati	Saibal Banerjee & Leena Gangopadhyay	Meghla Chowdhury	Bengali	
2019	Tritiya Adhyay	Manoj Michigan	Shreya	Bengali	
2019	Konttho	Shiboprosad Mukherjee and Nandita Roy	Pritha Mallick	Bengali	
2019	Password	Kamaleswar Mukherjee	Mariom	Bengali	
2019	Sanjhbati	Saibal Banerjee & Leena Gangopadhyay	Phuli	Bengali	
2020	Raat Baaki Hai	Avinash Das	Vaasuki	Hindi	Film released on Zee5
2020	Love Aaj Kal Porshu	Pratim D. Gupta		Bengali	
2020	Bulbbul	Anvita Dutt	Binodini	Hindi	
2022	Byomkesh Hotyamancha	Arindam Sil	Sulochona	Bengali	
2023	Palaan	Kaushik Ganguly	Paoli	Bengali	
2023	Ektu Sore Bosun	Kamaleshwar Mukherjee	Rokeya	Bengali	
2025	Lokkhikantopur Local	Ram Kamal Mukherjee	Kalyani	Bengali	
2026	Bibi Payra	Arjunn Dutta	Jhuma	Bengali	

== Television ==
Year	Show	Role	Channel	Notes
1999	Jibon Niye Khela		Zee Bangla	
	Tithir Atithi		ETV Bangla	
	Tarpor Chand Uthlo		Tara TV	
	Sonar Harin		ETV Bangla	
	Jaya			
	Scandal		Tara TV	
2016	Mahanayak		Star Jalsha	

== Web series ==
Year	Title	Role	Platform	Note
2018–2020	Kaali	Aparna	Zee5	
2022	The Great Indian Murder	Shabnam Saxena	Disney+ Hotstar	
2022	Karm Yuddh	Indrani Roy	Disney+ Hotstar	
2023	Charlie Chopra	Saloni Dabral	SonyLIV	
2025	Ganoshotru	Troilokya Devi	ZEE5	
2026	The Revolutionaries	Pishima	Prime Video	

=== Playback singer ===
Year	Film	Music director	Notes
2009	Kaalbela	Goutam Ghose	
