= Baga Beach (film) =

2013 Indian film in Konkani

- Poster of the film
- Directed by: Laxmikant Shetgaonkar
- Written by: Laxmikant Shetgaonkar
- Produced by: Pramod Salgaocar
- Starring: Paoli Dam; Cedric Cirotteau; Sadiya Siddiqui; Jean Denis Römer; Akash Sinha
- Cinematography: Arup Mandal
- Edited by: Sankalp Meshram
- Music by: Sidhanath Buyao; Emiliana da Cruz
- Production company: Sharvani Productions
- Release dates: November 2013 (International Film Festival of India); 30 May 2014 (Goa)
- Running time: 103 minutes
- Country: India
- Language: Konkani

Baga Beach is 2013 Indian Konkani-language film written and directed by Laxmikant Shetgaonkar. It followed his critically acclaimed Paltadacho Munis (2009).

Set in the eponymous Baga Beach in Goa, it was made at a budget of ₹3 crore, making it the most expensive film yet of Konkani cinema. The film deals with the underbelly of tourism in Goa, with issues of paedophilia and child sexual abuse, conflict between locals and immigrants leading to hostility towards migrant laborers, impact of holidaying foreigners on local culture. The film had an Indian, German and French cast, including Bengali actress Paoli Dam, who spoke Hindi in the film. It was shot in Goa with an handheld camera in sync sound.

It was screened at the 44th International Film Festival of India in 2013. Subsequently, it won the Best Feature Film in Konkani award at the 61st National Film Awards. After the awards, the Goa Legislative Assembly passed a resolution congratulating producer and director for making the film about "a topic which needed much attention", and called it an "eye opener on the issues related to children on our beaches." The film was commercially released in Goa on May 30, 2014, but was not commercially released nationwide.

== Cast ==
- Paoli Dam as Sobha
- Cedric Cirotteau as Martin
- Sadiya Siddiqui as Maggie
- Jean Denis Römer as Schroeder
- Akash Sinha as Devappa
- Harsh Mainra as Shop keeper
- Prashanti Talpankar as Celestine
- Reshma Jadhav as News Reporter
- Rajesh Karekar as Jerroviar
- Ivon C. de Souza as Brendan
- Pradeep Naik as Victor
- Serjee Kleem as Yuri

== Awards ==
- National Award for Best Feature Film in Konkani at the 61st National Film Awards

== See also ==
- Konkani cinema
- Paltadacho Munis
