= Prashanti Talpankar =

Indian writer and actor (born 1963)

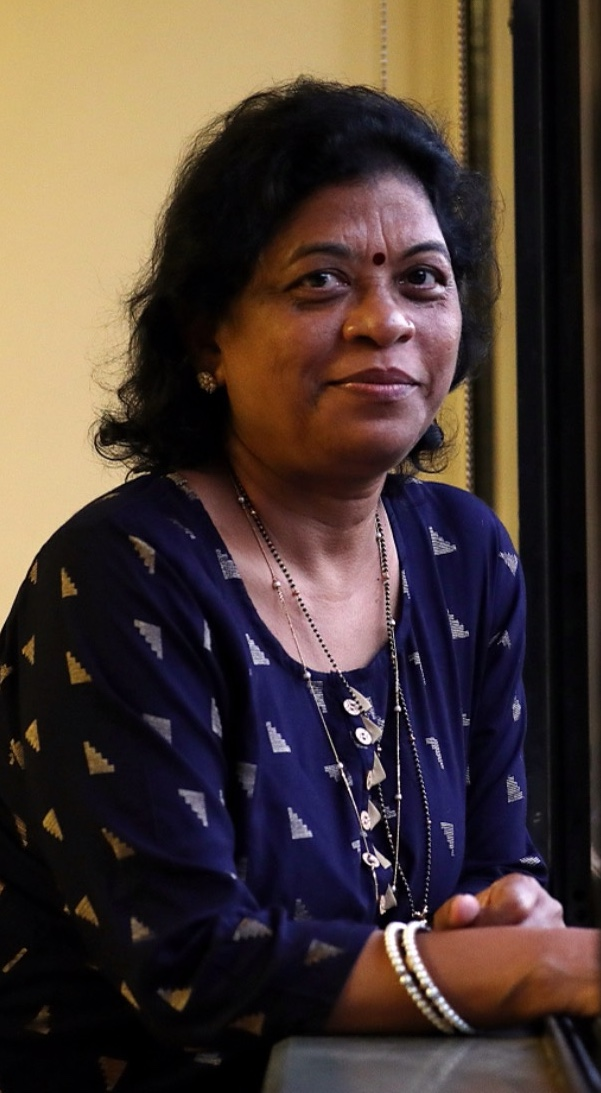
- Talpankar in 2023
- Born: 29 April 1963
- Occupations: Writer; actor
- Spouse: Sandesh Prabhudesai
- Writing career
- Notable awards: Sahitya Akademi Translation Prize (2017)
- Literary movement: Konkani language agitation

Prashanti Talpankar (born 29 April 1963) is an Indian writer, translator, playwright, and actor. She is a recipient of the Sahitya Akademi Translation Prize for her work in Konkani and is a cancer survivor.

== Early life ==
Prashanti Talpankar grew up as a student leader and as a part of Goa's historic official language agitation. She has also been a part of Bailancho Saad, an organisation that works towards women's rights. Notably, she went on a hunger strike in 1989, protesting against the lack of action in a case of sexual assault.

== Career ==
Talpankar currently serves as an associate professor at Dnyanprassarak Mandal's College.

=== Writing ===
Talpankar has been into writing since her college days. Her poems have previously featured on All India Radio, Panaji. She has also written few short stories. However, primarily she writes children's stories and translates literary works.

In 2006, she published a book based on primary survey of migrant labour called Shadows in the Dark: The status of the migrant working community in Goa. In 2015, Talpankar released a Konkani translation of Shashi Deshpande's English book That Long Silence, titled as Dirgh Moun Te. This was awarded the Sahitya Akademi Award for Translation in 2017.

=== Films ===
Talpankar has acted in many Konkani films. Some of her films include Aleesha (2004), Paltadacho Munis (2009), Baga Beach (2013) and Juze (2018). All of these films have won awards, at either the national or the international level.

== Personal life ==
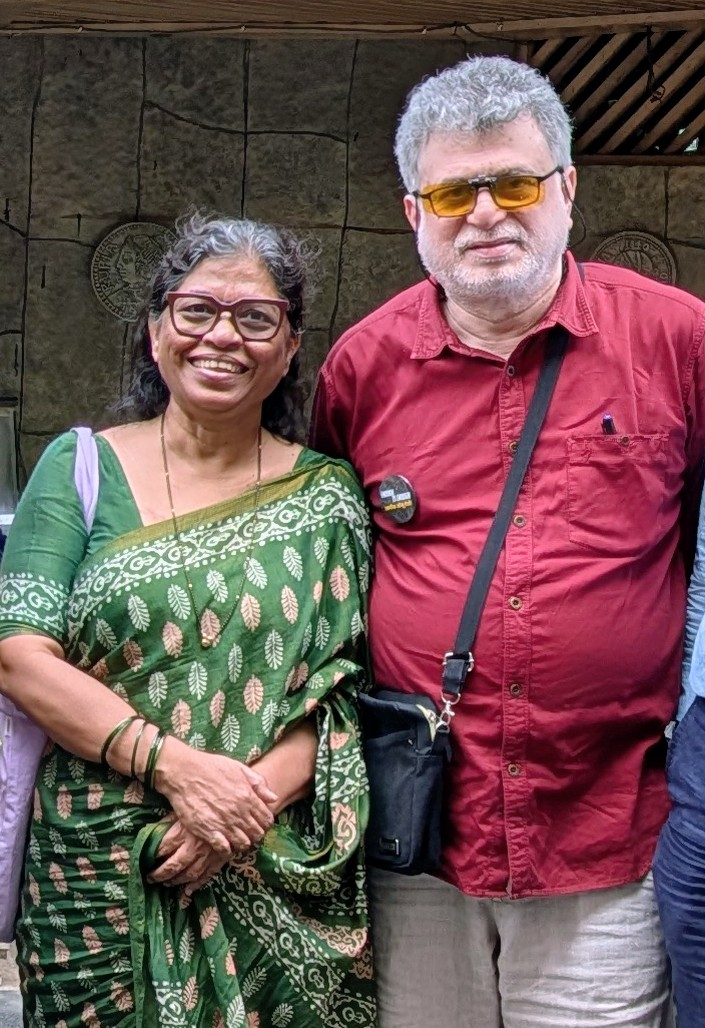
Prashanti Talpankar and Sandesh Prabhudesai in March 2026

Talpankar is married to author and journalist Sandesh Prabhudesai. Being a survivor of breast cancer, she now regularly talks about her cancer survival journey to spread awareness.

== Awards ==
- Sahitya Akademi Translation Prize, 2017
- Best Actor (International) award at 14th International Film Festival of South Asia (IFFSA) held in Toronto in October 2025.

== Filmography ==
- Aleesha (2004)
- Paltadacho Munis (2009)
- Baga Beach (2013)
- Juze (2018)
- Amori (2019)
- Ancessao (2025)

== Works ==
- Shadows in the Dark: The status of the migrant working community in Goa (2006)
- Dirgh Moun Te (Konkani translation of Shashi Deshpande's English book That Long Silence; 2015)
