= Ancessao =

2025 Indian Konkani-language short film

Ancessão is an Indian Konkani-language short film from Goa that has received international recognition at film festivals in Canada and India. The film won the award for Best Global Short Film at a film festival in Toronto in 2025 and was screened at several international and national film festivals the same year.

== Background ==
Ancessão was produced in Goa and is rooted in Goan social and cultural contexts. The film is primarily in the Konkani language and reflects themes associated with Goan identity and lived experiences. According to media reports, the film was created by a Goan team and was positioned for international festival circulation following its completion.

== Cast ==
- Prashanti Talpankar

== Festival screenings ==
In 2025, Ancessão was selected for screening at the International Film Festival of South Asia (IFFSA) in Toronto, where it was showcased as part of the festival's short film programme.

The film was also included in the lineup of the Hyderabad International Short Film Festival, further extending its festival presence within India.

== Awards and recognition ==
Ancessão received the Best Global Short Film award at a Toronto-based film festival in 2025. Media reports also noted that the film won multiple awards at the same festival, contributing to its international recognition.

== Reception ==
Press reports described Ancessão as a significant entry from Goa in the short film circuit, noting its reception at international festivals and its contribution to the visibility of Konkani cinema abroad.
