= Hochheta Ki =

Hochheta Ki?
- Directed by: Basu Chatterjee
- Starring: Prasenjit; Arunima Ghosh; Paoli Dam
- Release date: 29 February 2008
- Running time: 110 minutes
- Country: India
- Language: Bengali

Hochheta Ki? or Hochchheta ki? (Bengali: হচ্ছেটা কি? English: What's Happening?) is a 2008 Bengali comedy drama film directed by Basu Chatterjee. Chatterjee, director of Chhoti Si Baat, Baaton Baaton Mein and Khatta Meetha, tried to create a film in the style of David Dhawan.

== Plot ==
Hochheta Ki is the story of a medical representative (chhaposha Bangalibabu) who falls in love with another woman four years into his marriage. That may not be a problem; the problem is the way he looks into the camera and starts telling the story of his life. The two girls are Gharwali (Paoli Dam) and Baharwali (Arunima Ghosh).

== Cast ==
- Prasenjit Chatterjee as Modhu
- Rajatava Dutta as Ranjit
- Paran Bandopadhyay as Mr. Chakravarty
- Ramaprasad Banik as Mr Das
- Paoli Dam as Priya
- Arunima Ghosh as Juhia
