= Yaara Silly Silly =

2015 Indian romantic film directed by Subhash Sehgal

- Directed by: Subhash Sehgal
- Written by: Rajeev Yogendranath
- Produced by: Reena Bhushan Suri, Neena Subhash Sehgal
- Starring: Paoli Dam; Parambrata Chatterjee; Vidya Malvade; Eva Grover; Parth Suri
- Cinematography: Akash Agarwal
- Edited by: Mukesh Timori
- Music by: Ankit Tiwari
- Release date: 6 November 2015
- Running time: 108 minutes
- Country: India
- Language: Hindi
- Box office: ₹2.6 million

Yaara Silly Silly (transl. Friend, silly, silly) is a 2015 Indian romantic film directed by Subhash Sehgal which portrays a two-night relationship between a so-called twin soul. The film stars Paoli Dam and Parambrata Chatterjee in lead roles and was released on 6 November 2015 in India.

== Plot ==
A sex worker and her client meet each other after having spent a night together before. Through a journey, they discover each other and a relationship that changes their lives forever. A night with Soumitra Roy aka Sammy changes the life of a call-girl named Mallika.

Soumitra accidentally lands up at Mallika's place of work to spend the night with her due to the insistence of his two friends who insist he "needs to gain some experience." Numerous hilarious scenes follow after which the couple enjoy a refreshing outing together during the night. The couple then incidentally meets up again after five years during a train journey from Mumbai to New Delhi where those fond memories are rekindled and their romance blossoms. Mallika (now called Devanshi) misses her train to Kota, where she runs a home for under-privileged girls after having left her job at the brothel in Mumbai. She boards the next train to Delhi and bumps into Soumitro, who is going to New Delhi. Incidentally, they travel in the same coupe in AC First Class in the train and reminisce their earlier moments.

She is a much changed woman now after the rustic and vulgar sounding brothel girl. This was possible due to her meeting Sammy, who brought about a total change in her. He said that he is married to Akshara and she stays in Delhi and is an aspiring Municipal Corporator. When they reach Delhi, Devanshi alights and goes missing. Sammy tries hard to search for her at the railway platform but fails to do so. In fact, he liked Devanshi and wanted to settle down with her but she thought that she would intrude into his married life, whereas Sammy had actually separated from Akshara two years ago, which he did not inform Devanshi during the train journey. Now they were just friends and not a couple. Sammy came in contact with his twin soul but lost her out forever.

== Cast ==
- Parambrata Chatterjee- Soumitro Roy a.k.a. Sammy
- Paoli Dam- Mallika a.k.a. Devanshi S. Roy
- Vidya Malvade – Akshara, Soumitro's ex-wife in a special appearance
- Parth Suri
- Eva Grover in a special appearance
- Zafar Dhillon
- Falguni Rajani
- Ajay Jaiswal
- Santosh PAC
- Bhushan Suri in a special appearance
- Deepak Mehta
- Tanya Mehta
- Sana Khan
- Pranay Joshi
- Twinkle Gupta
- Karan Pahwa
- Reem
- Manish Raj
- Gauri Sharma
- Jeetu
- Mohna Banerjee
- Swatik Ghule
- Sparsh Tak
- Sukhvinder

== Soundtrack ==
Yaara Silly Silly

Soundtrack album by Ankit Tiwari
- Released: 10 October 2015
- Genre: Feature film soundtrack
- Length: 30:31
- Language: Hindi
- Label: Zee Music Company
External audio
- Audio Jukebox on YouTube

The soundtrack of Yaara Silly Silly consists of seven songs composed by Ankit Tiwari the lyrics of which have been written by Sandeep Nath.

Tracklist
No.	Title	Singer(s)	Length
1.	"Sathia" (Solo)	Ankit Tiwari	05:00
2.	"Sathia" (Duet)	Ankit Tiwari & Mehak Suri	05:03
3.	"Behki"	Shadab Faridi & Mehak Suri	03:54
4.	"Yun Hai"	Neeti Mohan	04:11
5.	"Tuk Tuk"	Nandini Srikar	04:05
6.	"Yaara Silly Silly" (Mashup)	Nandini Srikar, Neeti Mohan, Mehak Suri & Parth Suri	04:10
7.	"Sathia" (Unlugged)	Mehak Suri	04:17
Total length:			30:31

== Promotion ==
On 21 September 2015, the poster was released on Twitter by Taran Adarsh, an Indian film critic, journalist, editor and Bollywood film trade analyst. The trailer of the film was released on 25 September 2015 on by Zee Music Company featuring Paoli Dam and Parambrata Chatterjee.

== Critical reception ==
Mohar Basu of The Times of India gave the film a rating of 1.5 out of 5 and said that, "The film has a promising idea but the lacklustre screenplay plays spoilsport." Shubhra Gupta of The Indian Express criticized the film saying that, "Nothing delivers in 'Yaara Silly Silly'; not Parambrata Chatterjee, not Paoli Dam and most definitely not the film, which is exploitative in the extreme." Anuj Kumar of The Hindu praised the acting performances of the lead actors Paoli Dam and Parambrata Chatterjee but found the film's narrative to be contrived and said that, "The intentions are noble, Parambrata is believable but ultimately it is just a poor man's Chameli."
