= Ankur Arora Murder Case =

- Theatrical release poster
- Directed by: Suhail Tatari
- Written by: Vikram Bhatt
- Produced by: Vikram Bhatt
- Starring: Arjun Mathur; Kay Kay Menon; Vishakha Singh; Tisca Chopra; Paoli Dam
- Music by: Chirantan Bhatt
- Distributed by: ASA Productions and Enterprises; BVG Films
- Release date: 14 June 2013
- Running time: 129 minutes
- Country: India
- Language: Hindi
- Budget: ₹7.5 crore
- Box office: ₹10 crore

Ankur Arora Murder Case is a 2013 Indian Hindi medical thriller film directed by Suhail Tatari and written and produced by Vikram Bhatt. The film stars Arjun Mathur, Tisca Chopra, Kay Kay Menon, Paoli Dam. The film takes up an urgent and disturbing issue of death during surgery and is based on a real-life incident where a boy dies on the operation table due to medical negligence. The shooting of the film started after nearly one year of research, and similarities to real life are in this case, not coincidental.

== Plot ==
Dr. Romesh Sharma is a young medical intern who dares to dream. He is in awe of Dr. Viren Asthana, the Chief Surgeon of the Shekhawat General Hospital. All he wants is to be like him. He lives with Dr. Riya Srivastava, his co-intern and the love of his life.

However, when an eight-year-old boy, Ankur Arora (Vishesh Tiwari), dies due to Dr. Asthana's medical negligence, Romesh realises that a good surgeon is not necessarily a good person.

Together with Ankur's mother, Nandita Arora, Nandita's friend, Ajay Shetty, their lawyer, Kajori Sen, and Dr. Romesh, they set out on a turbulent journey to fight for what is right. A fight for justice against his mentor, the hospital, and the love of his life, who is initially against him for the fear of ruining her career and future. It is revealed that Kajori is in a relationship with her opposing lawyer, who tells her to keep the case hanging and only blame the hospital overall, not Dr. Asthana specifically. She does the same in the court but soon finds that she is pregnant with his child. As she informs him, he orders her to abort the baby. Romesh spots them together, and with Nandita, he goes to her house, only to find her lying ill due to the abortion pill. They take her to the hospital, and she promises them that she will fight for Ankur. It turns out that all the necessary evidence against Dr. Viren Asthana is destroyed or literally snatched. Dr. Riya, who witnesses the operation, and Rosina D'Costa (Khushboo Kamal), a ward nurse in the hospital who had informed Dr. Asthana about Ankur eating some biscuits before the operation, also lie in court. The next day Riya goes to Dr. Viren Asthana to sign for leave. She tells him that she lied and cheated with the credibility of her profession, and her self-respect is questioning her. A heated argument between her and Dr. Asthana follows in which Dr. Asthana labels himself as the god who should be forgiven for the mistake he has done. It is revealed in the hospital the next day that Riya had actually shot the confession outburst by Dr. Viren Asthana on her mobile and presented it to the court. The case ends in their favour, and Dr. Viren Asthana gets arrested. In the last scene, Romesh and Riya reunite, and Nandita is shown remembering her memories with Ankur.

== Cast ==
- Tisca Chopra as Nandita Arora, Ankur's mother
- Arjun Mathur as Dr. Romesh Sharma
- Kay Kay Menon as Dr. Viren Asthana
- Vishakha Singh as Dr. Riya Srivastava
- Harsh Chhaya as Shekhawat Awasthi, Owner of the hospital
- Paoli Dam as Advocate Kajori Sen, Nandita's lawyer
- Sachin Khurana as Ajay Shetty, employer and Nandita's friend
- Manish Choudhary as Advocate Rajiv Mallani, Shekhawat & Dr. Asthana's lawyer
- Kanchan Awasthi as Dr. Hiya Shah
- Vishesh Tiwari as Ankur Arora, Nandita's son
- Khushboo Kamal as Rosina D'Costa
- Krunal Pandit
- Abhay Bhargava
- Vikram Kumar Vij
- Pankaj Thakur
- Praveen Pachpore
- Anumita
- Deepak Dhawal

== Production ==
The production of the film began in September 2012, the initial thought was to shoot the film in the same hospital in Delhi where the case happened.

== Soundtrack ==
Ankur Arora Murder Case

Soundtrack album by Chirantan Bhatt, Sunny-Inder, Gourav Dasgupta
- Label: T-Series

=== Track listing ===
The lyrics are penned by Sagar Lahauri

No.	Title	Artist(s)	Length
1.	"Aaja Ab Jee Le Zara"	Dev Negi and Deepali Sathe
2.	"Tera Aks Hai"	Sunidhi Chauhan; Inder Bawra
3.	"Roshni"	Shaan

== Critical reception ==
Professional Reviews
Review scores
Source	Rating
The Times of India	7/9 stars
IBN7	5/9 stars
Bollywood Hungama	6/9 stars

The movie received mixed reviews. Subhash K. Jha gave the film 4 stars and said, "Indeed The Ankur Arora Murder Case is a far cleverer, wiser and relevant film than most of what we get to see these days. Bursting at the seams with acting talent director Suhail Tatari's restorative drama hits us where it hurts the most. The conscience." Meena Iyer of Times of India gave it 3.5 stars. "Tatari is a winner in his choice of a subject. The story that has been researched from a true life incident does provide meaningful insights about the medical fraternity and facilities. However while the film is an eye-opener on medical skullduggery, it fails to become cutting edge cinema because the screenplay-offers few surprises." said ToI. Shubhra Gupta of Indian Express said, "Pity because this could have been a medico-legal thriller with teeth." and gave it 2 star. Tushar Joshi of Daily News and Analysis gave it 2 stars. "The film engages you in the beginning but loses steam because of a its weak execution." wrote Tushar Joshi. NDTV Movies gave it a rating of 2.5. Taran Adarsh of Bollywood Hungama gave it 3 stars.
