= Miransha Naik =

Indian filmmaker

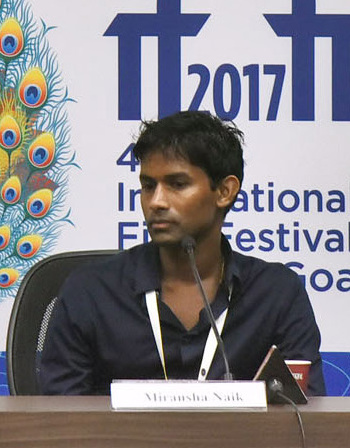
- Naik in 2017
- Born: Quepem, Goa, India
- Occupations: Scriptwriter; director; producer
- Known for: Juze
- Awards: Special Jury Award at Minsk Film Festival (2017); Best Director at Singapore South Asian International Film Festival, 2018

Miransha Naik is an Indian film director, producer and screenwriter, hailing from the coastal state of Goa. He is known for his debut Konkani feature film, Juze.

== Early life ==
Miransha Naik grew up in Borimol village, Quepem. He dropped out of his commerce course in College to join the hospitality industry. He set up his own beachside shack and beach huts, named Blue Corner, on Benaulim Beach.

After settling his business, he began travelling within India and abroad. With all the travels, his love for films grew further. He recalls that two scenes in Juze, which show the village children watching Subhash Ghai's Karz and Hero, are based on memories of Naik and his young friends and Naik's love for movies.

He then took a short-term screenwriting course at Asian Academy of Film and Television, Noida. In 2010, he entrusted his sister and brother-in-law the responsibility of running Blue Corner and joined a screenwriting course at Whistling Woods International, Mumbai where he was exposed to a wider range of films, including Indian and international arthouse films. He co-wrote his first short, Remember A Day in 2012, before going on to direct Ram (2014).

== Career ==
Miransha Naik made his writing and directorial debut with the short film Ram in 2014. It was a comedy about a Goan boy desperate to lose his virginity, and featured debutante teenager Rushikesh Naik (who later played the lead role in Juze). His debut feature film was the critically acclaimed Juze. The film is about the social injustice and exploitation faced by migrant labourers in Goa, and is set in the 1990s. It was co-produced by people from India, France and Netherlands (Thin Air, Three Rivers, Kepler Films, Cine-Sud Promotion) under the banner of Goa Film Bazaar, with some of the editing done in Paris. The film is partially based on Naik's childhood experiences. It premiered at the Hong Kong International Film Festival in April 2017. It was screened at more than 20 festivals around the World including the prestigious Karlovy Vary International Film Festival, Minsk Film Festival, Dublin International Film Festival, Mumbai Academy of the Moving Image, International Film Festival of India. The Hollywood Reporter said the following about the film Juze, "Juze is a poised, contemplative and topical debut" and "Naik produced a film which foretells bigger things ahead for the filmmaker and his colleagues in Goa"

== Filmography ==
- Juze (2017)
- Ram (2014) (short film)
- Remember A Day (2012) (short film; co-writer)

== Awards ==
- Special Jury Award at Minsk Film Festival, 2017 (For his film, Juze)
- Best Director Award at Singapore South Asian International Film Festival, 2018
- Best Debut Director at Innovative Film Festival, 2017
