= Swatta =

2017 Bangladeshi romantic drama film directed by Hashibur Reza Kallol

- Theatrical released poster
- Directed by: Hashibur Reza Kallol
- Screenplay by: Ferdous Hassan
- Story by: Sohani Hossain
- Based on: Maa by Sohani Hossain
- Produced by: Sohani Hossain
- Starring: Shakib Khan; Paoli Dam
- Cinematography: Asaduzzaman Majnu
- Edited by: Shamsul Arefin Sadi
- Music by: Bappa Mazumdar
- Production company: Taranga Entertainment
- Distributed by: Taranga Entertainment
- Release dates: April 7, 2017 (Bangladesh); April 2017 (Worldwide)
- Running time: 143 Minutes
- Country: Bangladesh
- Language: Bangla

Swatta (Bengali: সত্তা, transl. The Entity) is a 2017 Bangladeshi romantic tragedy film. The film was directed by Hashibur Reza Kallol and produced by Sohani Hossain under the banner of Taranga Entertainment. It is a story written by Sohani Hossain and the screenplay and dialogue written by Ferdous Hassan. The film features Bangladeshi superstar Shakib Khan and Paoli Dam (in her Bangladeshi debut) in the lead roles and Kabila, Nasreen, Rina Khan, Don and many others played supporting roles in the film.

The principal photography of the film began on November 16, 2014, and wrapped up on November 20, 2016. The first look teaser of the film was revealed on April 14, 2016. The film was released on April 7, 2017, in Bangladesh. The film's soundtrack album was composed by Bappa Mazumder, which was his first soundtrack composition. It is the second direction of Hashibur Reza Kallol; previously he directed a film titled Andha Nirangam, which is based on the evolution of Lalon's philosophy and consciousness. The film won numerous accolades including five National Film Awards in several categories including Khan's fourth Best Actor award at the 42 National Film Awards, six Bachsas Awards including Khan's third Best Actor award, two Meril-Prothom Alo Awards.

== Cast ==
- Shakib Khan as Sobuj, an estranged son of a rich man, whose aunt and uncle turn him into a drug addict and desperate to seize his property
- Paoli Dam as Shikha, a prostitute, who killed a doctor to save her honor and fled to Dhaka and later fell in love with drug addicted Sabuj
- Don as himself, a leader of a terrorist group hired by Sabuj's uncle and aunt to kill him
- Rina Khan as Ranga Mashi (রাঙা মাসি), a woman prostitute businesswoman
- Kabila as himself, Sabuj's friend and collaborator
- Nasreen as Rita, a prostitute, Shikha's friend and collaborator
- Jadu Azad as Akkas, Sabuj's uncle, who along with his wife want desperate to seize Sabuj's property
- Shamima Naznin as Rupa, Shikha's mother
- Shabnam Parvin as Sabuj's aunt, who along her husband want desperate to seize Sabuj's property
- Jayanta Chattopadhyay as Shikha's father
- Shimul Khan as Zahir, a Police official
- Bithi Rani Sarkar - Item number; guest appearance in "Gulistaner Moor" song
- Liza Mitu - Item number; guest appearance in "Raja Bodol" song

== Production ==
On October 15, 2014, the film Muharat was held at a restaurant in Dhaka.

=== Casting ===
Initially, though the film was supposed to feature Ahmed Rubel in the role of Paoli Dam's father, later he was dropped for the role and Jayanta Chattopadhyay was taken for this character after he was not present on time and was not present with the schedule.

Bonna Mirza, who played the role of Rupa as the mother of one of the film's most important character Paoli Dam, after three days of shooting, suddenly felt the urge to return to the stage, and he withdrew from the film. Shamima Nazneen was later selected for this character.

=== Filming ===
The principal photography of the film began on November 16, 2014, at the Jharna spot of BFDC, the lead actors of film Shakib Khan and Paoli Dam took part in the first day of filming. The second part of filming of the film started on December 26, 2014, in the Pubali of Dhaka. After the shooting of second lot, the film was stopped due to schedule complication of Shakib Khan and Paoli Dam. Subsequently, the third lot of filming was begun on February 24, 2016, in this lot Shaheed Minar, BFDC, Dhaka Cantonment and Gulshan Ladies Park are being filmed for six days. Then, the fourth and final lot of filming was begins on October 15, in Cox's Bazar in Bangladesh. There are two songs and several scenes of the film were filmed for five days leading up to October 20, 2016.

== Soundtrack ==
Swatta (Original Motion Picture Soundtrack)

Soundtrack album by Bappa Mazumder
- Released: March 2017
- Recorded: September–October 2012; 3 August 2014
- Studio: Tarang Entertainment
- Genre: Feature Film Soundtrack
- Length: 27:02 minutes
- Language: Bangla
- Label: Qinetic Network
- Producer: Bappa Mazumder

Singles from Swatta : Original Motion Picture Soundtrack
- 1. "Onek Kothar Vire (অনেক কথার ভিড়ে)" Released: 23 March 2017; 2. "Naa Jani Kon Oporadhe (না জানি কোন অপরাধে)" Released: 26 March 2017; 3. "Ami Toke Chai (আমি তোকে চাই)" Released: 28 March 2017; 4. "Tor Premete Ondho Holam (তোর প্রেমেতে অন্ধ হলাম)" Released: 30 March 2017

The soundtrack of the film was composed by Bappa Mazumder. The film used a total of seven songs, including two item songs. A song from the soundtrack titled "Naa Jani Kon Oporadhe" was recorded on September 19, 2012, in Bappa Mazumdar's own studio, where Momtaz Begum collaborated with him for the first time. Earlier in the same month, he recorded two songs from the soundtrack sung by himself with Dilshad Nahar Kona and Samina Chowdhury titled "Anek Kothar Bhire" and "Ami Toke Chai". And also a song titled "Tor Premete" was recorded on August 3, 2014. On March 23, 2017, the first song of the film "Onek Kothar Vire" was released as a promotional track on Deco's YouTube channel under the banner of Qinetic Network. After that, the second song of the film titled "Naa Jani Kon Oporadhe" was released on March 26, and the song sung by Momtaz Begum, for the song she won the National Film Awards, the Meril Prothom Alo Awards and the Bachsas Awards as the Best Female Singer And also Bappa Mazumder won the National Film Award for the first time as the Best Music Director for the song. The third song of the film titled "Ami Toke Chai" was released on March 28, on the occasion of Shakib Khan's birthday, the song sung by Bappa Mazumder and Samina Chowdhury. Then the fourth song of film titled "Tor Premete Ondho Holam" sung by James and lyrics written by Sohani Hossain was released on March 30, 2017. For the song Sohani Hossain won the Global Music Awards for Best Lyricist in 2018, and James won the National Film Awards, the Meril Prothom Alo Awards and the Bachsas Awards in the Best Male Singer category. The song placed number 1 in the List of the Top 50 songs by ABC Radio in 2017, and it was ranked number 3 on the "Top 10 Bengali Songs Listened to YouTube in 2017" by The Daily Star.

Track list
No.	Title	Lyrics	Music	Singer (s)	Length
1.	"Tor Premete Ondho Holam (তোর প্রেমেতে অন্ধ হলাম)"	Sohani Hossain	Bappa Mazumder	James	5:12
2.	"Naa Jani Kon Oporadhe (না জানি কোন অপরাধে)"	Shejul Hossain	Bappa Mazumder	Momtaz Begum	3:40
3.	"Onek Kothar Vire (অনেক কথার ভিড়ে)"	Sheik Abdullah Al Matin Rana	Bappa Mazumder	Dilshad Nahar Kona, Bappa Mazumder	4:23
4.	"Tobu Abar Ghar Bandhilam (তবু আবার ঘর বাঁধিলাম)"	Manzoor Ehsan Chowdhury	Bappa Mazumder	Sumi Shabnom	4:32
5.	"Ami Tore Chai (আমি তোকে চাই)"	Hashibur Reza Kallol	Bappa Mazumder	Samina Chowdhury, Bappa Mazumder	4:26
6.	"Gulistaner Mor (গুলিস্তানের মোড়)" (Item song 1)	Shahan Kabondho	Bappa Mazumder	Mila Islam	3:21
7.	"Raja Bodol (রাজা বদল)" (Item song 2)	Ahsan Kabir	Bappa Mazumder	Pantha Kanai, Badhan Sarkar Puja	2:48
Total length:					27:02

== Promotion and released ==
The first look teaser of the film was revealed on YouTube on April 14, 2016, on the occasion of Pahela Baishakh. The film was submitted to the censor board on 12 January 2017, and then the film got an uncut certificate from the Bangladesh Film Censor Board on January 31, 2017. Director Hashibur Reza Kallol revealed a drawing poster of the film on his Facebook account on March 5, 2017, which was designed by Aseem Chandra Roy of Kolkata. Following that the official trailer of the film was released on YouTube channel of Khan Films on March 16, 2017. On March 6, 2017, the film's producer and story writer Sohani Hossain organized a special exhibition of the film at the Rupakatha Cinema Hall in Pabna. On April 4, 2017, as a part of film promotion the inaugural exhibition of the film was held at the Star Cineplex in Dhaka.

=== Released ===
The film was released on April 7, 2017, in 48 theatres all over the country.

On January 13, 2018, the film was exhibited in the Bangladesh Panorama category at the 2018 Dhaka International Film Festival. The film also exhibited at the Global Film Festival on August 22, 2019.

== Reception ==
=== Critical reception ===
Ruhul Amin of Risingbd.com writes that his "several incompatibilities were noticed" in the film, such as the rural girl spoke fluently in Dhakaiya language, and everything was in a hurry. But he praised the performance of the two lead characters.

=== Awards and nominations ===
Events	Date of Events	Category	Nominee	Results	Ref
Meril Prothom Alo Awards	30 March 2018	Best Male Singer	James (song: "Tor Premete Ondho Holam")	Won	
Meril Prothom Alo Awards	30 March 2018	Best Female Singer	Momtaz Begum (song: "Naa Jani Kon Oporadhe")	Won	
Global Music Awards	16 November 2018	Best lyricist	Sohani Hossain (song: "Tor Premete Ondho Holam")	Won	
Cinema Aajtaak Film Achiever Awards	19 November 2018	Best Film (Bangladesh)	Swatta	Won	
Bachsas Awards	5 April 2019	Best Director	Hashibur Reza Kallol	Won	
Bachsas Awards	5 April 2019	Best Actor	Shakib Khan	Won	
Bachsas Awards	5 April 2019	Best Supporting Actress	Nasrin	Won	
Bachsas Awards	5 April 2019	Best Music Director	Bappa Mazumder	Won	
Bachsas Awards	5 April 2019	Best Male Singer	James (song: "Tor Premete Ondho Holam")	Won	
Bachsas Awards	5 April 2019	Best Female Singer	Momtaz Begum (song: "Naa Jani Kon Oporadhe")	Won	
National Film Awards	8 December 2019	Best Actor	Shakib Khan	Won	
National Film Awards	8 December 2019	Best Music Director	Bappa Mazumder (song: "Naa Jani Kon Oporadhe")	Won	
National Film Awards	8 December 2019	Best Lyricist	Shejul Hossain (song: "Naa Jani Kon Oporadhe")	Won	
National Film Awards	8 December 2019	Best Male Singer	James (song: "Tor Premete Ondho Holam")	Won	
National Film Awards	8 December 2019	Best Female Singer	Momtaz Begum (song: "Naa Jani Kon Oporadhe")	Won	
