= Shejul Hossain =

Bangladeshi journalist, lyricist, writer and director

Shejul Hussen
- Occupations: Journalist, lyricist, writer, director

Shejul Hussen is a Bangladeshi journalist, lyricist, writer and director. He won National Film Awards 2017 for best lyrics. He is the chief executive of Swapnasiri Audio Visual.

== Biography ==
Hussen was born in the village of Nurpur of Dowarabazar of Sunamganj. He started his career in journalism in 2004. He worked in media like Amader Shomoy and Ekushey Television. He joined ATN Bangla in 2014.

Hussen started writing in 2000. His first book Fulpakhir Jonmomrityu was published in 2010. His second book Smritimegh, Swapnajalrekha was published in 2013. His book Dokhin Duarer Hawa was published in 2014. In 2016, his book O Jibon O Maya was published.

Hussen's first direction in television was Faad. He also wrote the story of this drama. He wrote the story of Opoghat too.

Hussen started song writing in 2006. He wrote more than 100 songs. For his lyrics writing of "Na Jani Kon Oporadhe" of Swatta he won National Film Awards 2017 for best lyrics. He is the youngest person to win National Film Award in this category.

== Awards and nominations ==
Year	Award	Category	Song	Film	Result
2017	National Film Awards	Best Lyrics	"Na Jani Kon Oporadhe"	Swatta	Won
