= Vidya Malvade =

Indian actress (born 1973)

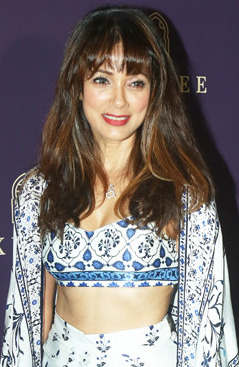
- Malvade in 2023
- Born: 2 March 1973 (age 53); Mumbai, Maharashtra, India
- Occupations: Air hostess, actress
- Years active: 2003–present
- Spouses: Arvind Singh Bagga (m. 1997; died 2000) Sanjay Dayma (m. 2009)

Vidya Malvade (born 2 March 1973) is an Indian actress.

== Early life ==
Malvade was born on 2 March 1973 in Maharashtra, India. She is the niece of veteran actress Smita Patil. She has two sisters.

== Career ==
Vidya started her career as an air hostess. She then began modelling and was chosen by ad filmmaker Prahlad Kakkar for some advertisements. Her acting debut was with Vikram Bhatt's Inteha (2003) which failed at the box office. After a string of unsuccessful movies and several advertisements, she acted in Chak De India in the year 2007 playing the role of a goalie and captain of the Indian women's national hockey team. Her most recent movie was Yaara Silly Silly.

== Personal life ==
Vidya studied Law and worked as an Air Hostess. Her first husband, Capt. Arvind Singh Bagga, was a pilot with Alliance Air. He died in 2000 when his flight, Alliance Air Flight 7412, crashed into a building in Patna. In 2009, she married Sanjay Dayma, who worked with Ashutosh Gowariker on the Oscar award-nominated Lagaan as the film's Screenplay Writer and Associate Director.

== Filmography ==
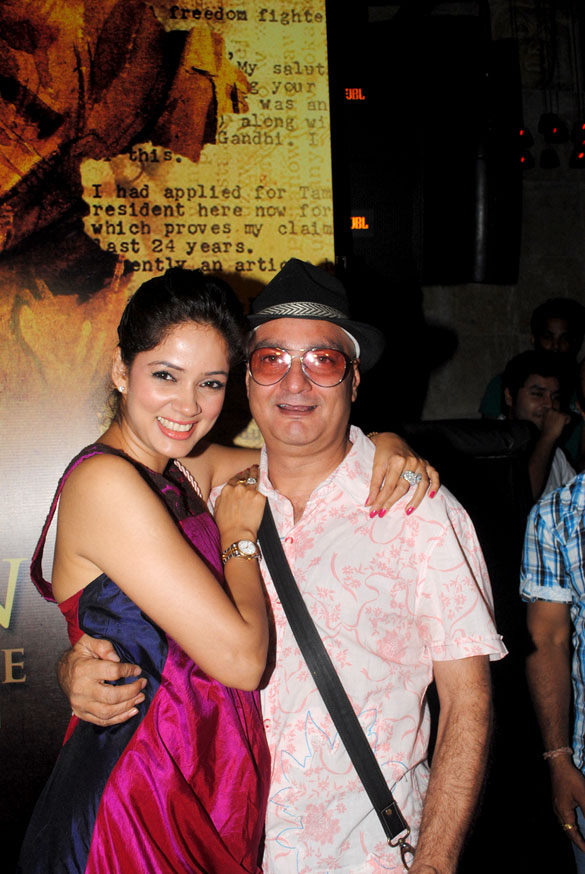
Vidya Malvade with Vinay Pathak at Wrap up & first look launch party of 'Gour Hari Dastaan'

=== Film ===
Year	Title	Role	Notes
2003	Inteha	Nandini Saxena	
2005	Mashooka	Monica	
2005	U, Bomsi n Me	Shehnaz	
2007	Chak De! India	Vidya Sharma	
2008	Benaam		
2008	Kidnap	Mallika Raina	
2010	Tum Milo Toh Sahi	Anita Nagpal	
2010	Aap Ke Liye Hum		
2010	No Problem		
2010	Dus Tola	Qaazi's Begum- Special appearance	
2010	Striker	Devi	
2012	Chakradhaar	Avantika	
2012	1920: Evil Returns	Karuna	
2012	Shobhana 7 Nights		
2013	Once Upon ay Time in Mumbai Dobaara!	Mona	
2014	LUV... Phir Kabhi		
2015	Gour Hari Dastaan	Tanvi	
2015	Yaara Silly Silly	Akshara	
2017	Heartbeats	Naina	
2021	Koi Jaane Na	Rashmi	
2023	Starfish	Sukanya Salgaonkar	
2024	Ruslaan	Mantra	
2024	Naam	Vidya	Delayed release; Filmed in 2004
2025	Sangee	Mohini	
2026	Baby Do Die Do	Manju Murjhani	

=== Television ===
Year	Title	Role	Notes
2005	Mirchi Top 20	Host	Music Hits show
2006	Family No. 1	Main Role	Aired on Sony Entertainment Television (India)
2008	Fear Factor - Khatron Ke Khiladi	Contestant	Aired on Colors TV
2015	Darr Sabko Lagta Hai	Dr. Naina	"Abbey Villa" (Episode One)

=== Web series ===
Year	Title	Role	Platform
2019	Inside Edge 2	Tisha Chopra	Amazon Prime Video
2020	Flesh	Reba Gupta	Eros Now
2020–present	Mismatched	Zeenat Karim	Netflix
2020	Who's Your Daddy	Monika Bagga	ALTBalaji and ZEE5
2021	Bamini and Boys	Bamini	Disney+ Hotstar
2022	Dr. Arora	Vaishali	SonyLIV

== Awards and nominations ==
Year	Film	Award	Category	Result
2004	Inteha	Filmfare Award	Best Female Debut	Nominated
2004	Inteha	Screen Awards	Best Female Debut	Nominated
2004	Inteha	Star Guild Awards	Best Female Debut	Nominated
2004	Inteha	Stardust Awards	Superstar of Tomorrow- Female	Nominated
2004	Inteha	Stardust Awards	Best Breakthrough Performance – Female	Nominated
2009	Kidnap	Stardust Awards	Best Breakthrough Performance – Female	Nominated
