= Sandesh Prabhudesai =

Indian journalist and author (b. 1960)

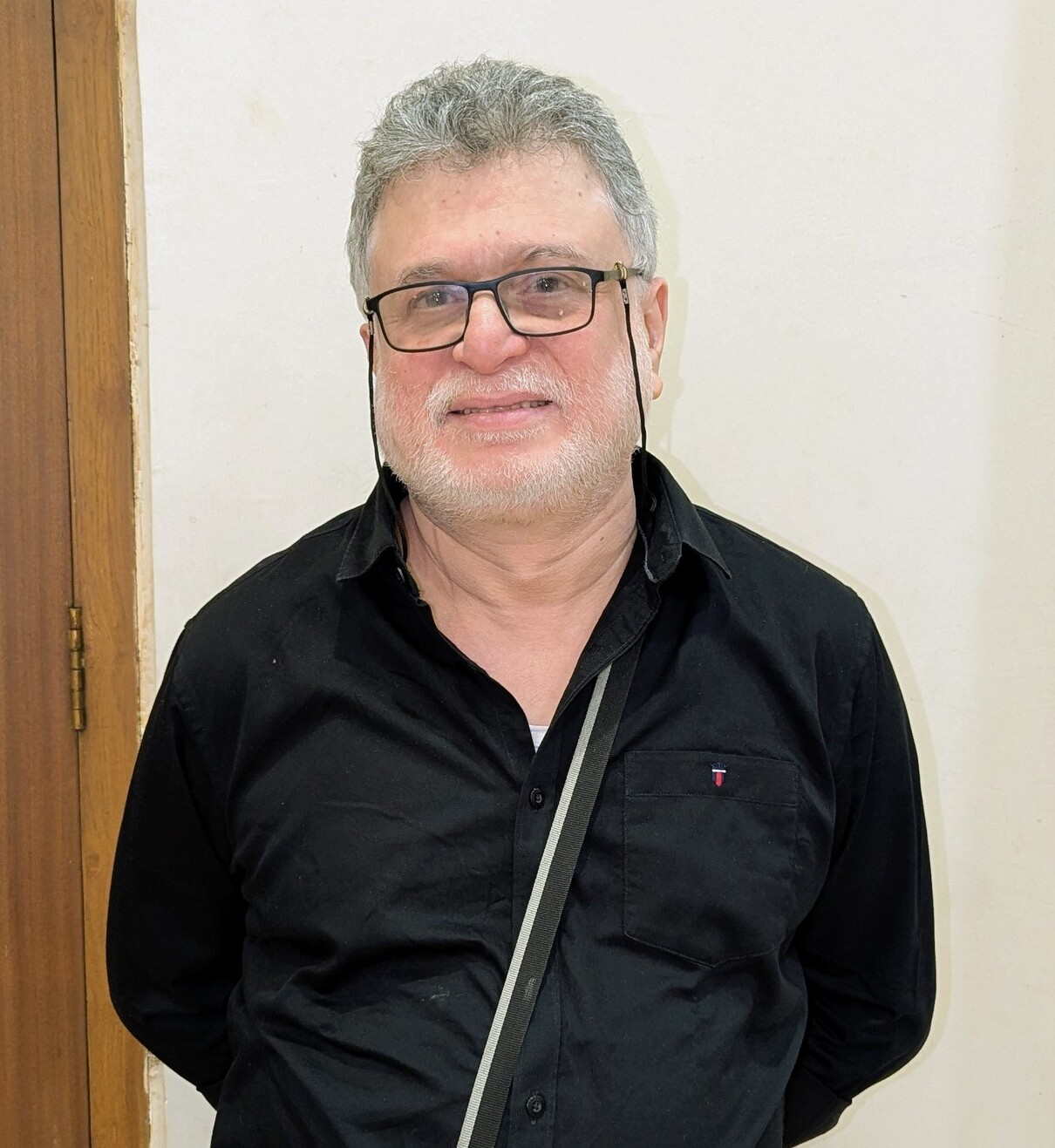
- Sandesh Prabhudesai in 2025
- Born: 15 August 1960 (age 66); Margao, Goa
- Education: Commerce Graduate
- Occupations: Journalist, author
- Spouse: Prashanti Talpankar
- Writing career
- Language: Konkani; Marathi; Hindi; English
- Years active: 1987–present
- Movement: Konkani language agitation
- Website: goanews.com

Sandesh Prabhudesai (born 15 August 1960) is an Indian journalist and author from Goa. His writings cover politics, history, culture and social aspects.

== Early and personal life ==
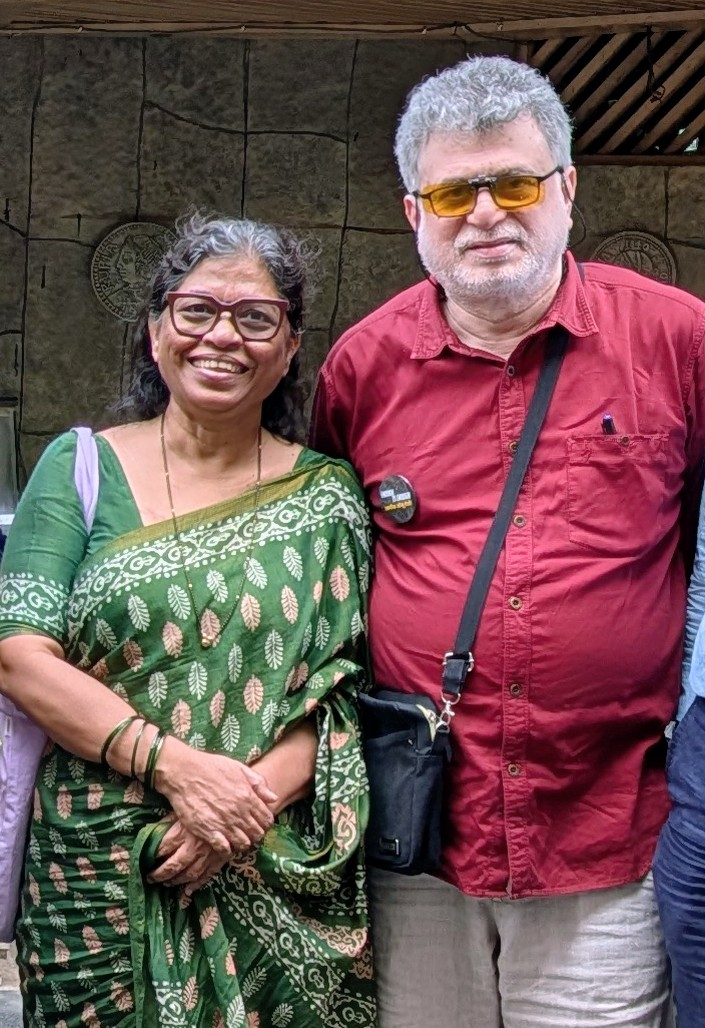
Prashanti Talpankar and Sandesh Prabhudesai in 2026

Sandesh Prabhudesai was born on 15 August 1960. Prabhudesai's parents Manohar and Shobha were freedom fighters, hailing from Loliem, Canacona. He has been an activist, right from his student days. He was active as a student leader of Progressive Students Union (PSU), Goa, in the 1970s and 1980s. In the 1990s, he was part of the group that advocated for a free and fair Goa Right to Information Act (GRIA) of 1997. He is also actively associated with the literary and cultural movement of Goa. He also heads the ManoShobha Kalaghar Trust, a cultural centre his family has created in his ancestral village of Loliem in Canacona taluka. He is married to author Prashanti Talpankar.

== Career ==
Prabhudesai started his professional career as a journalist in 1987, while he was reporting for daily and weekly publications in Goa from his student days. He writes in Konkani, Marathi, Hindi and English. During Goa's historic Students' Movement of '70s and '80s, he was also part of the editorial board of a statewide students' magazine "Udent" and the editor of a youth magazine "Sangeen". From 1987 till 2020, he worked in day-to-day journalism as a correspondent, Chief Reporter, TV anchor, conducting TV debates and interviews. He was the Editor of Konkani Newspaper Sunaparant and TV channels Prudent Media and Goa365. He also worked as the State correspondent for national and international media in Hindi and English, including BBC News. He is also founded India's unique Mobile News Service "Goenkar News" and Goa's first news website goanews.com, in 1999. Prabhudesai is associated with the Goa Union of Journalists (GUJ) and was a general secretary when the GUJ successfully fought for enactment of India's first Right to Information Act in the state.

At the 2013 edition of Goa Arts and Literature Festival, renowned poet Gulzar released three books written by Prabhudesai - Ghusamat (Marathi), Taalgadi (Konkani) and Clear Cut (English). Clear Cut: Goa behind the Glamour is a collection of op-eds written by Prabhudesai, featuring articles written about subjects like the medium of instruction and the Archdiocese of Goa.

His 2022 book, Ajeeb Goa's Gajab Politics, covers the political history of Goa. It was released on the 191st birth anniversary of Savitribai Phule. The book describes how Goa's politics is not influenced by the usual factors such as caste and religion, but is usually dependent on the candidate. His 2024 book, Double Engine: History of Goa Lok Sabha Elections, was released before the 2024 Indian general election and covers Goa's history at the Lok Sabha Elections.

== Awards ==
In 2022, Prabhudesai was awarded the Laxmidas Borkar Smruti Patrakarita Puraskar (transl. Laxmidas Borkar Memorial Journalism Award).

== Works ==
- Ghusamat (Marathi; 2013)
- Taalgadi (Konkani; 2013)
- Clear Cut: Goa behind the Glamour (2013)
- Ajeeb Goa's Gajab Politics (2022)
- Double Engine: History of Goa Lok Sabha Elections (2024)
