= Inteha (2003 film) =

- Directed by: Vikram Bhatt
- Written by: Mahesh Bhatt; Girish Dhamija
- Produced by: Mukesh Bhatt; Kumkum Saigal
- Starring: Ashmit Patel; Vidya Malvade; Nauheed Cyrusi
- Cinematography: Pravin Bhatt
- Edited by: Akiv Ali
- Music by: Anu Malik
- Production company: Vishesh Films
- Release date: 24 October 2003
- Country: India
- Language: Hindi

Inteha (English: Limit) is a 2003 Indian Hindi-language action thriller film directed by Vikram Bhatt and produced by Mukesh Bhatt. The film stars Ashmit Patel, Vidya Malvade (in their debuts), and Nauheed Cyrusi. It was released on 24 October 2003.

== Plot ==
Nandini leaves the bright lights of Mumbai to settle in the hill town of Koti (which is actually Ooty) to look after her younger sister Tina after the demise of their father. Tina is a spoilt brat who despises her older sister -- she thinks she is interfering and should mind her own business. Tina finds out she's being watched and photographed by a young handsome stranger who seems rather taken with her. When she finally meets him face-to-face, she is smitten by his dark, dangerous looks. While Tina and Ranbir find passion, Nandini brews tension. She does not trust the stranger (we don't know anything about his past, she says). But she tries to know him better to make Tina happy. Then, the twist -- a murder in a hotel convinces Nandini that all is not hunky-dory with the hunk. She begins to uncover clues to Ranbir's dark past.

As Nandini gets closer to Ranbir's real identity, Tina refuses to believe her sister. Ranbir threatens Nandini until she has to apologise for reporting him to the police by saying sorry. S-O-R-R-Y. Nandini is helpless. Especially when her life is threatened. Finally, she signs everything over to little sister and seems to head out of town. What she actually does is search for more clues for Ranbir.

== Cast ==
- Ashmit Patel as Ranbir Oberoi / Vikram Rathod / Rakesh Sharma
- Vidya Malvade as Nandini Saxena
- Nauheed Cyrusi as Tina Saxena
- Anup Soni as Rohit
- Avtar Gill as Advocate Ranjit S. Thakur
- Aanjjan Srivastav as Mohanlal
- Prithvi Zutshi as Mr. Saxena
- Jehangir Khan

== Soundtrack ==
Inteha

Soundtrack album by Anu Malik
- Released: 16 August 2003
- Recorded: 2003
- Genre: Soundtrack
- Label: T-Series

Anu Malik chronology
Sssshhh... (2003)	Inteha (2003)	LOC: Kargil (2003)

The soundtrack of Inteha was composed by Anu Malik. The lyrics were written by Rahat Indori, Praveen Bhardwaj and Dev Kohli. Though Shreya Ghoshal was credited in the track "Ab Humse Akele Raha Jaaye Na", the female vocals for the song have originally been given by Alka Yagnik.

=== Track listing ===
#	Song	Singer(s)	Lyrics	Length
1	"Humsafar Chahiye"	Udit Narayan and Alka Yagnik	Rahat Indori	7:47
2	"Yun Hi Dil Ko Agar"	Shaan and Shreya Ghoshal	Rahat Indori	7:34
3	"Dhalne Lagi Hai Raat" (Duet)	Sonu Nigam and Shreya Ghoshal	Rahat Indori	6:47
4	"Dhalne Lagi Hai Raat" (Sad Version)	Sonu Nigam	Rahat Indori	2:16
5	"Ab Humse Akele Raha Jaaye"	Sonu Nigam, Alka Yagnik	Praveen Bhardwaj	8:09
6	"Deewana Dil"	Shreya Ghoshal	Dev Kohli	7:41
7	"Dhalne Lagi Hai Raat"	Sonu Nigam	Rahat Indori	4:54

== Critical response ==
Taran Adarsh of IndiaFM gave the film one star out of five, writing, "On the whole, INTEHA has more minuses than plusses. At the box-office, due to tough competition with other films in its week of release and no hype or publicity to back it up, INTEHA will find it difficult to survive. Below average." Anita Bora of Rediff.com wrote, "With thrillers, the key is getting all the ingredients right. Else, it turns a little comical. Unfortunately, that is where Inteha suffers. Besides a few small shocks, there is not much left to the viewer's imagination. In the end, neither the decent music nor the commendable effort from its cast can save Inteha. All I can say is -- you might be better off this Diwali watching the lights in the sky. Else, be warned, you could be sorry. Really S-O-R-R-Y!!"
