= Laxmikant Shetgaonkar =

Indian filmmaker

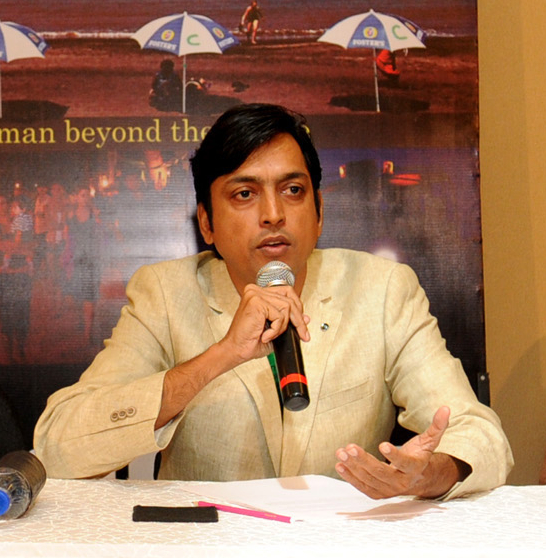
- Shetgaonkar in 2011
- Born: Cuncolim, Goa, India
- Occupations: Director; screenwriter
- Years active: 2004–2013
- Notable work: Paltadacho Munis; Baga Beach
- Awards: Yuva Srujan Puraskar (2009)

Laxmikant Shetgaonkar is an Indian film director and screenwriter. He is best known for his critically acclaimed Konkani films, Paltadacho Munis and Baga Beach.

== Early life ==
Shetgaonkar was born in Cuncolim, Salcete. While in Delhi, he developed a love for films after attending many film festivals.

== Career ==
Shetgaonkar's career began as an assistant director and screenplay writer in Mumbai. His first film was Eka Sagar Kinaree (A Seaside Story), which won him a Golden Conch in the Best Fiction category at the Mumbai International Film Festival. His next film, Paltadacho Munis (The Man Beyond the Bridge), premiered at 2009 Toronto International Film Festival, where it won the prize of the International Federation of Film Critics (FIPRESCI Prize) for Discovery. Set in Goa, the film is about a recently widowed forest ranger in a dwindling forest, who strikes up an unlikely relationship with a woman he finds lost and alone in the woods.

In 2013, Shetgaonkar released Baga Beach, which won the Best Feature Film in Konkani award at the 61st National Film Awards. After the awards, the Goa Legislative Assembly passed a resolution congratulating him for making the film about "a topic which needed much attention", and called it an "eye opener on the issues related to children on our beaches."

== Filmography ==
Year	Title
2004	Eka Sagar Kinaree (A Seaside Story)
2009	Paltadacho Munis (The Man Beyond the Bridge)
2013	Baga Beach
