= James (musician) =

Bangladeshi singer (born 1964)

- জেমস
- James in 2026
- Born: Faruq Mahfuz Anam James; 2 October 1964 (age 62); Rajshahi, East Pakistan, Pakistan (present-day Bangladesh)
- Other name: Guru
- Occupations: Singer-songwriter; playback singer; record producer; actor
- Years active: 1981–present
- Musical career
- Origin: Rajshahi, Bangladesh
- Genres: Psychedelic rock; hard rock; blues rock
- Instruments: Guitar; bass; vocals; keyboards; drums; saxophone; flute
- Labels: Sargam; Soundtek; Sangeeta; Sony BMG; Saregama

Faruq Mahfuz Anam James (born 2 October 1964), known mononymously as James, is a Bangladeshi singer-songwriter, guitarist and composer, also known as a playback singer. He is the lead singer, songwriter and guitarist of the rock band Nagar Baul (previously Feelings). He is often referred by the term "Guru" which means "master" or "teacher".

James rose to mainstream fame in the 1990s as the frontman of the band Feelings, one of the "Big Three of Bangla Rock", who were responsible for developing and popularizing hard rock music in Bangladesh, along with LRB and Ark. Feelings is considered to be the pioneer of psychedelic rock in Bangladesh.

James has also led a successful solo career, with hit albums like Ononna (1989), Palabe Kothay (1995), Dukhini Dukkho Korona (1997), Thik Achhe Bondhu (1999). He sang in four Bollywood films, including Gangster (2006), Woh Lamhe (2006), Life in a... Metro (2007), and Warning (2013).

James won Bangladesh National Film Award for Best Male Playback Singer twice for his performance in the films of Desha: The Leader (2014) and Swatta (2017).

== Early life ==
James was born on 2 October 1964 to Mojammel Haque and Jahanara Khatun in Naogaon, Rajshahi in the then East Pakistan. Mojammel was a government employee and worked as the chairman of the Dhaka Education Board. Owing to his father’s professional transfers, James began his education at Blue Bird School in Sylhet and later attended Rajshahi Collegiate School. He spent his college years in Nilphamari and Sirajganj. After completing college, James developed a strong interest in music. As no one in his family had any musical background, his parents were opposed to his decision to pursue a career as a singer.

Defying his parents’ wishes, James left home while he was in class eight in 1976 to follow his passion for music. He eventually took residence at room 36 at Aziz Boarding, located at Pathantuli Road in the Kadamtali area of Chittagong City. The boarding house was the center of his early musical activities, where he spent most of his time composing songs and practicing music.

From his teens, James developed an avid interest in music, an interest which his family did not accept or support. In the early-to-mid 1970s, while learning guitar, James became interested in bands like The Doors, Dire Straits, Led Zeppelin and guitarists like Eric Clapton, Mark Knopfler and Jimi Hendrix.

James joined Feelings in 1977, as the vocal and the lead guitarist.

== Career ==
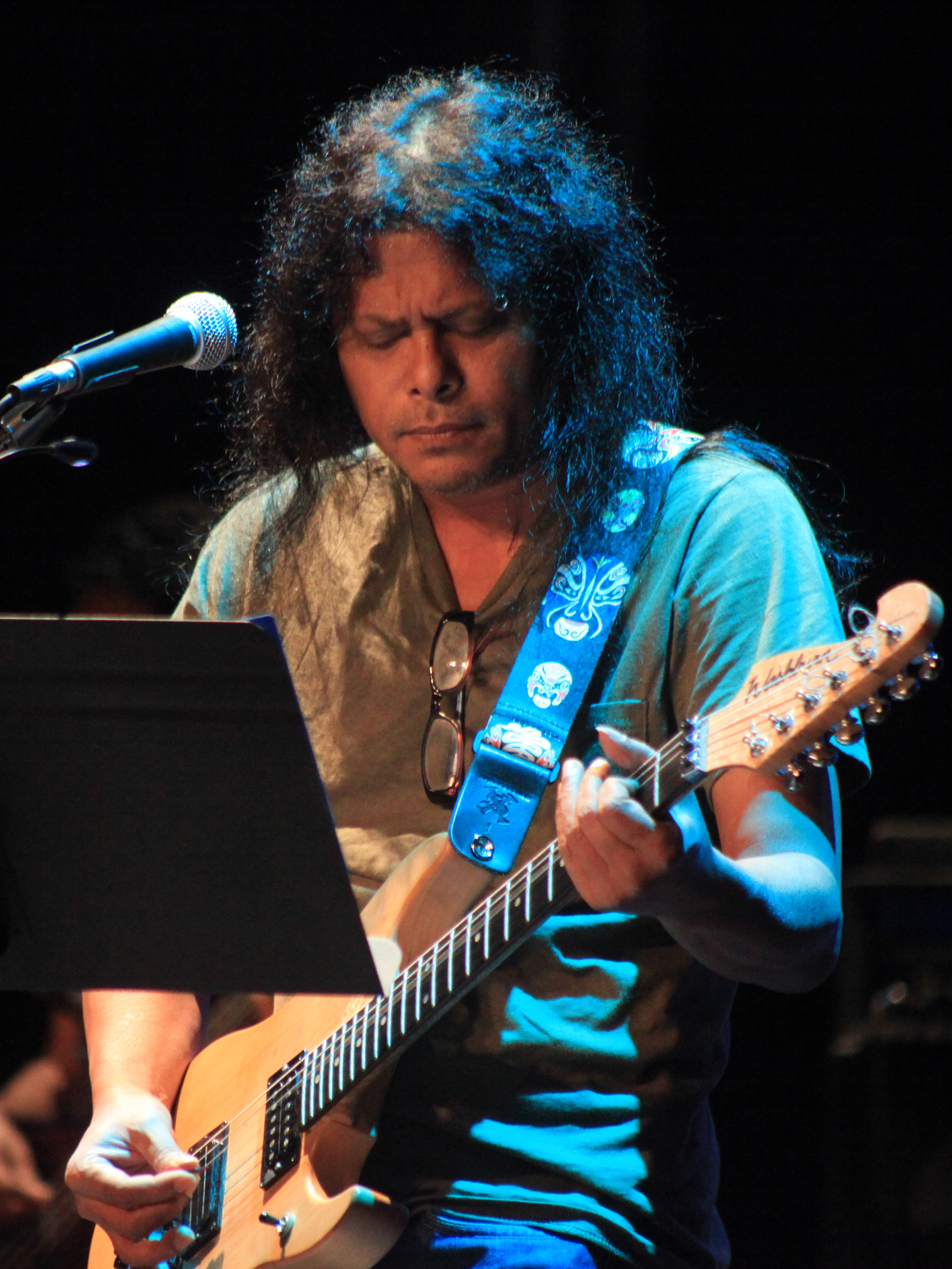
James performing in San Francisco Bay Area in 2013.

=== Nagar Baul (1981–present) ===
After some members left Feelings in 1981, James, Fanty, Pablo, and Swapan re-formed the band and started to perform in local gigs. This was the line-up at that time:

- James – lead guitar, vocals
- Ahsan Elahi (Fanty) – drums
- Pablo – keyboards, vocals
- Swapan – bass guitar

Present Line Up

- James – Lead Guitar, Vocals
- Ahsan Elahi (Fanty) – Drums
- Shawon – Keyboards
- Talukdar Sabbir – Bass Guitar

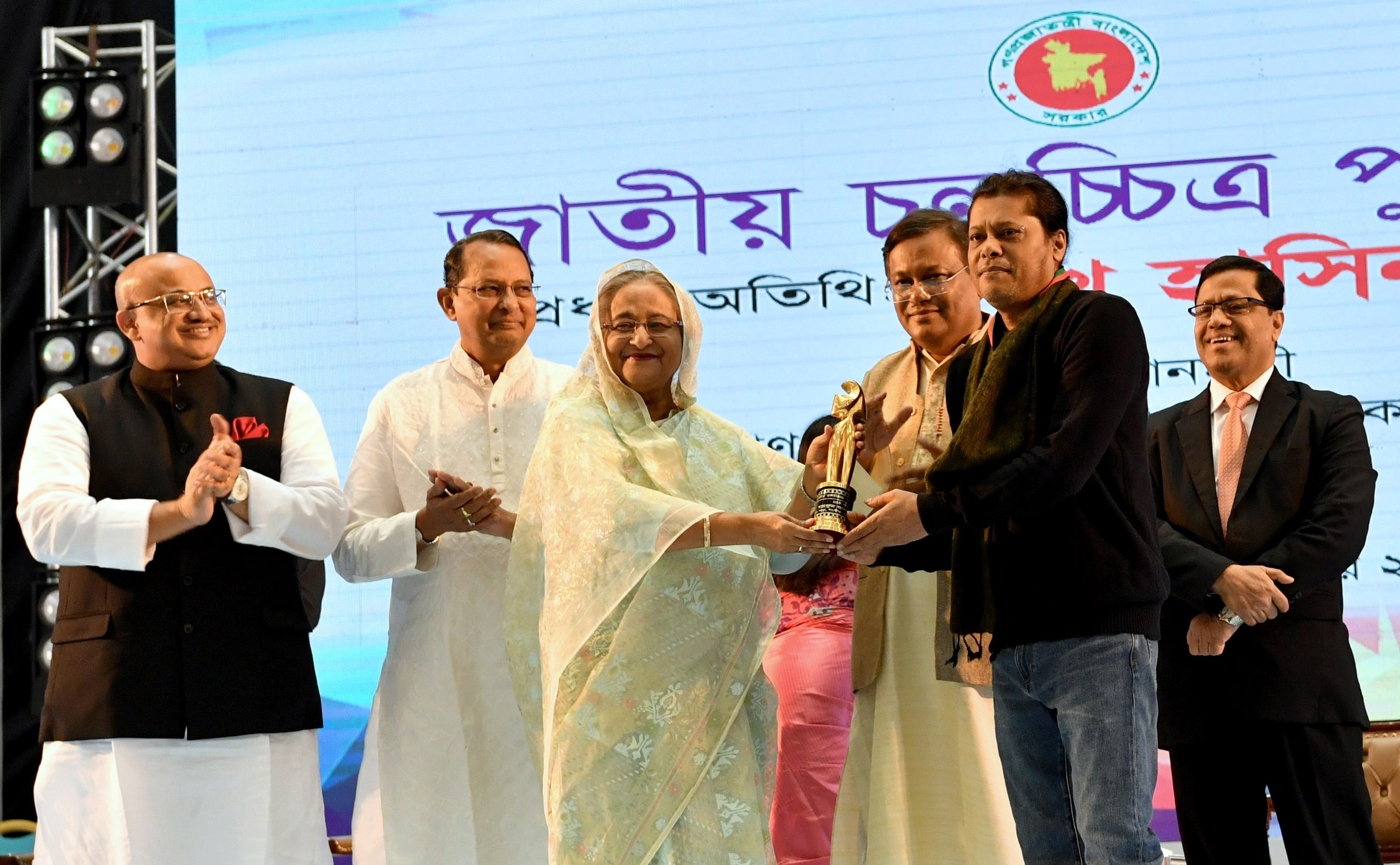
James received National Film Awards in 2019.

After several years of stage shows, they came to Dhaka to record their first album, Station Road. James composed all the tracks, and wrote the lyrics for five of them. Though the album was not a hit, the tracks "Ager Jonome", "Amai Jete Dao" and "Rupshagor" enjoyed moderate success.

In 1993, they released their second album Jail Theke Bolchhi (Speaking from Jail). This album was a major hit, and Feelings became a mainstream band.

James sings psychedelic rock and blues music. He has cited Jim Morrison, Mark Knopfler, and Eric Clapton as his influences.

Many lyricists have written songs for James, including poet Shamsur Rahman, Prince Mahmud, Marzuk Rasel, Shibli and Deholovi. Musicians and music composers like Lucky Akhand, Manam Ahmed, and Shawkat have also composed songs for him.

The albums he released with Feelings after Station Road (Originally titled Feelings), Jail Theke Bolchhi, Nagar Baul in 1996, Leis Fita Leis in 1998, Collection of Feelings in 1999. His first solo album was Ononna, released in 1989, followed by Palabe Kothai in 1995, Dukkhini Dukkho Korona in 1997, Thik Achhe Bondhu in 1999, Ami Tomader E Lok in 2003, Jonota Express in 2005, Toofan in 2006 and Kal Jomuna in 2009.

James later renamed Feelings as Nagar Baul. The first and only album under the new name was Dushtu Cheler Dol, released in 2001.

=== Bollywood ===
James has been one of the most popular artists, both as a solo musician and with his band in Bangladesh and in West Bengal, since the 1990s. He met Pritam Chakraborty, an Indian Bengali music director and composer working in Bollywood, in 2004. In 2005, James did the playback for the film Gangster. The song was "Bheegi Bheegi" and it was a blockbuster hit, remaining at the top of the Bollywood Hit List for more than a month. He teamed up with Pritam again for the film Woh Lamhe in 2006 for the song "Chal Chalein", and again for "Rishtey" and "Alvida (Reprise)" in the film Life in a Metro.

James' last song in Bollywood, titled "Bebasi", was released in 2013, for the film Warning.

== Media ==
James first appeared in a television commercial for Pepsi in the early 2000s. This commercial was broadcast both in West Bengal and Bangladesh. In 2011, he starred in a Bangladeshi TVC for Black Horse, a brand of energy drinks. James appeared in the Bollywood movie Life in A... Metro, in which he played the role of a member of a street band, along with Pritam and Suhail Kaul.

== Red Dot Entertainment ==
James, along with Gazi Shubhro and Jewel Paiker, co-owns the production house RED dot Multimedia Ltd, established in December 2005.

== Personal life ==
James was first married to film actress Rathi from 1991 until 2003. He then married Benazir Sazzad whom he met in 2000 and then spilt in 2014. He married his third wife, Namia Amin, on 12 June 2024 in Dhaka who he had met in Los Angeles in June 2023. He has two sons and two daughters from all his marriages.

James is an enthusiastic amateur photographer, and his photos have been used on album covers.

== Discography ==
=== as "Feelings" ===
- "স্টেশন রোড (Station Road) (1987) (Originally known as Feelings)
- "জেল থেকে বলছি (Speaking from Jail)" (1993)
- "নগর বাউল (Urban Bard)" (1996)
- "লেইস ফিতা লেইস (Lace Ribbon Lace)" (1998)

=== as "Nagar Baul" ===
- "দুষ্ট ছেলের দল (Mischievous Boys' Party)" (2001)

=== Solo albums ===
- "অনন্যা (Unparalleled)" (1989)
- "পালাবে কোথায় (Where to Run?)" (1995)
- "দুঃখিনি দুঃখ করোনা (Don't be Sad, Sad Girl)" (1997)
- "ঠিক আছে বন্ধু (Okay, my Friend)" (1999)
- "আমি তোমাদেরই লোক (I am one of you)" (2003)
- "জনতা এক্সপ্রেস (People's Express)" (2005)
- "তুফান (Typhoon)" (2007)
- "কাল যমুনা (Tidal Jamuna)" (2008)

== Film soundtracks ==
Year	Film	Song	Composer(s)	Songwriter(s)	Co-singer(s)
1999	Narir Mon	"Mirabai"	Ahmed Imtiaz Bulbul	Marzuk Russell	solo
2000	Koshto	"Dosh Mash Dosh Din"	Ahmed Imtiaz Bulbul	Ahmed Imtiaz Bulbul	solo
2006	Woh Lamhe	"Chal Chale"	Pritam Chakraborty	Sayeed Quadri	solo
2006	Gangster	"Bheegi Bheegi"	Pritam Chakraborty	Sayeed Quadri	solo
2007	Moner Sathe Juddho	"Ashbar Kaale Ashlam Eka" or "Dui Diner Ek Jail"	Emon Saha	Kabir Bakul	solo
2007	Life in a... Metro	"Rishtey" and "Alvida (Reprise)"	Pritam Chakraborty	Sayeed Quadri	Another version of "Alvida" alongside K.K.
2011	Matir Thikana Laal Tip	"Chotur Dolay" Bhola Mon Rey	Ahmed Imtiaz Bulbul Ibraar Tipu	Kabir Bakul	solo
2013	Warning 3D	"Bebasi"	Meet Bros Anjjan	Kumaar	and Aditi Paul
2014	Desha: The Leader	"Desha Ashche"	Shafiq Tuhin	Shafiq Tuhin	solo
2015	Warning (2015 film)	"Eto Koshto"	Shawkat Ali Emon	Kabir Bakul	solo
2016	Sweetheart (2016 film)	"Bidhata"	Shafiq Tuhin	Shafiq Tuhin	solo
2017	Swatta	"Tor Premete"	Bappa Mazumder	Sohali Hossain	solo
