= Amori (film) =

2019 Konkani drama film

- Movie poster
- Directed by: Dinesh P. Bhonsle
- Written by: R M Vardhan
- Cinematography: Dinesh Bhonsle
- Music by: Schubert Cotta
- Production company: Opus Gala
- Release date: 6 September 2019
- Running time: 1h 47m
- Country: India
- Language: Konkani

Amori is a 2019 Konkani drama film based on water conservation and a nexus between politicians and builders. The film is directed by Dinesh P. Bhonsle, written by R M Vardhan, and produced by Opus Gala. Schubert Cotta has composed the music. It stars Salil Naik, Sobita Kudtarkar, Mayur Mayekar, Prashanti Talpankar, Tanmay Kharpe, and Shaina Mirashi. In 2019, the film bagged the Best Konkani Film award in the feature film category, at 66th National Film Awards.

== Plot ==
The film revolves around the issue of environment and water conservation and shows how people struggle to work for the betterment of society.

== Production ==
=== Filming ===
The shooting of the film commenced in Goa and went on for two and a half years. The entire film was shot in different parts of Goa.

=== Screening ===
The premiere of the film was held in Inox Margao, a theater based in Goa, India, where Minister for Power Nilesh Cabral was invited as chief guest, Fr Jose Costa as guest of honor, and Digambar Kamat, Leader of Opposition, as special guest. The film was screened in various territories of the state of Goa including Panaji, Margao, Bicholim, Valpoi, Vasco da Gama, Cuncolim, and Curchorem.

The Government of Goa allowed schools and colleges to take their students to watch the film so as to raise awareness on environmental issues among the students.

In 2019 Amori was screened for students of schools and colleges in Goa.

== Cast ==
- Salil Naik
- Sobita Kudtarkar
- Mayur Mayekar
- Prashanti Talpankar
- Tanmay Kharpe
- Shaina Mirashi
- Daksha Shirodkar

== Accolades ==
Year	Ceremony	Category	Result	Ref.
2018	66th National Film Awards	Best Feature Film	Won	
