= Paltadacho Munis =

2009 Indian film by Laxmikant Shetgaonkar

- Poster of the film
- Directed by: Laxmikant Shetgaonkar
- Written by: Mahabaleshwar Sail
- Produced by: NFDC
- Starring: Chittaranjan Giri; Vasant Josalkar; Prashanti Talpankar; Veena Jamkar
- Cinematography: Arup Mandal
- Edited by: Sankalp Meshram
- Music by: Ved Nair
- Production company: National Film Development Corporation of India
- Release date: 14 September 2009 (TIFF)
- Running time: 96 minutes
- Country: India
- Language: Konkani

Paltadacho Munis or The Man Beyond the Bridge is an Indian film in Konkani directed by Laxmikant Shetgaonkar. Set in Goa, the film is about a recently widowed forest ranger in a dwindling forest, who strikes up an unlikely relationship with a woman he finds lost and alone in the woods. The film tries to destigmatise mental illness, often equated with being possessed by the devil in rural India.

The film was premiered at 2009 Toronto International Film Festival, where it won the prize of the International Federation of Film Critics (FIPRESCI Prize) for Discovery. It was chosen as opening film of the Indian Panorama section at the 40th International Film Festival of India (IFFI) 2009. Thereafter it went to receive international critical acclaim, including the narrative jury award at the Indian Film Festival of Los Angeles. It was included in the world's best films of 2009 list. According to a review, it strikes a perfect balance between the personal and the political. Laxmikant's cinema is rich in metaphors, remarkable in its restrain and exciting in its modern sensibility. The film won the National Film Award for Best Feature Film in Konkani at the 57th National Film Awards. The film was also nominated for the Network for the Promotion of Asian Cinema (NETPAC) award, Berlin.

Shetgaonkar's next film was Baga Beach.

== Plot ==
Vinayak (Chittranjan Giri) is a forest guard who lost his wife to a wild beast. He now lives all by alone in the forest. He then meets a mentally unstable woman (Veena Jamkar). Gradually, the two develop a unique bond. Meanwhile, the local priest and an aspiring politician connive to build a temple on forest land.

== Awards ==
- International Federation of Film Critics (FIPRESCI Prize) for Discovery (2009)
- Narrative Jury Award at the Indian Film Festival of Los Angeles (2010)
- National Film Award for Best Feature Film in Konkani at the 57th National Film Awards

== Cast ==
- Chittaranjan Giri as Vinayak
- Veena Jamkar as Mad woman
- Prashanti Talpankar as Lady
- Vasant Josalkar as Priest
- Deepak Amonkar as Forest ranger
