= Hashibur Reza Kallol =

Bangladeshi filmmaker

- হাসিবুর রেজা কল্লোল
- Occupation: Film director
- Years active: 2009–present

Hashibur Reza Kallol is a Bangladeshi film director best known for his 2017 film Swatta, for which he received the Bachsas Award in the category of Best Director.

== Career ==
Kallol started his work life as a photographer at Prothom Alo newspaper.

Kallol wrote and directed the 2011 docu-fiction style film Andho Nirangam, about modern day Bauls and Lalon Shah's philosophy. His second film, the romance Swatta, featuring Shakib Khan and Paoli Dam, took two and a half years to shoot. It was released in 2017. For the film, he received the Bachsas Award in the category of Best Director.

As of 2022, Kallol is also multimedia editor of The Daily Star.

== Filmography ==
Key
†	Denotes films that have not yet been released

Year	Film	Director	Notes	Ref.
2011	Andho Nirangam	Yes	Docu-fiction film	
2017	Swatta	Yes		
TBA	Kobi †	Yes	Delayed	

== Awards ==
- 2017 Bachsas Award in the category of Best Director for Swatta
- 2026 Hashibur Reza Kallol has been awarded an honorary doctorate by Cedarbrook University for recognition of his long-standing contributions to Bengali culture, filmmaking, media, and humanitarian initiatives.
- 2026 Hashibur Reza Kallol has been awarded an honorary doctorate by Chania International University for his long-standing contributions to Bengali culture, filmmaking, media, and humanitarian initiatives.
