= 42nd Bangladesh National Film Awards =

National Film Awards, Bangladesh

- Awarded for: Best of Bangladeshi cinema in 2017
- Awarded by: President of Bangladesh
- Presented by: Ministry of Information
- Announced on: 7 November 2019
- Presented on: 8 December 2019
- Site: Dhaka

Highlights
- Best Feature Film: Dhaka Attack
- Best Actor: Shakib Khan; Arifin Shuvoo
- Best Actress: Nusrat Imrose Tisha
- Lifetime achievement: ATM Shamsuzzaman; Sujata
- Most awards: Gohin Baluchor (7)

The 42nd National Film Awards were presented on 8 December 2019 by the Ministry of Information, Bangladesh, to felicitate the best of Bangladeshi films released in the calendar year 2017.

== List of winners ==
Name of Awards	Winner(s)	Film
Lifetime Achievement	ATM Shamsuzzaman; Sujata	
Best Film	Kaisar Ahmed; Sunny Sanowar	Dhaka Attack
Best Documentary Film	Bangladesh Television	Bishwa Anginay Amar Ekushe
Best Director	Badrul Anam Soud	Gohin Baluchor
Best Actor	Shakib Khan; Arifin Shuvoo	Swatta; Dhaka Attack
Best Actress	Nusrat Imrose Tisha	Haldaa
Best Supporting Actor	Shahadat Hossain	Gohin Baluchor
Best Supporting Actress	Suborna Mustafa; Runa Khan	Gohin Baluchor; Haldaa
Best Actor/Actress in Negative Role	Zahid Hasan	Haldaa
Best Actor/Actress in Comic Role	Fazlur Rahman Babu	Gohin Baluchor
Best Child Artist	Naimur Rahman Apan	Chhitkini
Best Child Artist in Special Category	Anannya Samayel	Ankhi O Tar Bandhura
Best Music Director	Farid Ahmed	Tumi Robe Nirobe
Best Dance Director	Ivan Shahriar	Dhat Teri Ki
Best Male Playback Singer	James	Swatta
Best Female Playback Singer	Momtaz Begum	Swatta
Best Music Composer	Bappa Mazumder	Swatta
Best Lyricist	Shejul Hossain	Swatta
Best Story	Azad Bulbul	Haldaa
Best Screenplay	Tauquir Ahmed	Haldaa
Best Dialogue	Badrul Anam Soud	Gohin Baluchor
Best Editing	Not given	
Best Cinematography	Kamal Chandra Das	Gohin Baluchor
Best Art Direction	Uttam Guho	Gohin Baluchor
Best Sound Recording	Ripon Nath	Dhaka Attack
Best Costume Design	Rita Hossain	Tumi Robe Nirobe
Best Make-up	Md Zaved Miah	Dhaka Attack
