= Nerul, Goa =

Nerul is a village in North Goa's Bardez taluka. It lies along the route to the coastal town of Candolim, with which it is linked via a bridge. For the purposes of the Census, it is considered as a census town.

== Area and population ==
Nerul has an area of 9.85 square kilometres and a population of 1,178 households. This made up a total of 5,042 individuals, comprising 3,024 males and 2,803 females. The under-six population comprised 577 children in 2011, of whom 289 were boys and 288 girls.

== Setting ==
Nerul is surrounded by rivers on three sides of the village -- north, west and east. On its east side, it is linked to the village of Reis Magos, which also houses an epynomyous fort and a jetty. It has thus been a fishing village, though changing now with the growth of tourism in the vicinity.

Close to Nerul are the villages of Marra, Pilerne, Candolim and the historic Aguada, which houses a fort of the same name.
