= Matthew Gonsalves =

Indian footballer (born 1978)

Personal information
- Date of birth: 9 October 1978 (age 48)
- Place of birth: Nerul, Goa, India
- Height: 1.68 m (5 ft 6 in)
- Position: Right back

Team information
- Current team: Dempo

Senior career*
Years	Team	Apps	(Gls)
2004–2014	Sporting Goa	44	(0)
2014–2015	Pune	13	(1)
2016–2017	FC Bardez		
2018–	Dempo		
- * Club domestic league appearances and goals as of 07:00, 8 May 2020 (UTC)

Matthew Gonsalves (born 9 October 1978) is an Indian football player who currently plays as a right back for Dempo.

== Career ==
Sporting Clube de Goa president Peter Vaz scouted Gonsalves from Mormugao Port Trust (MPT) football team, and since then the defender is currently playing with the Sporting Clube de Goa.

His journey began early in his schooling days where he represented his village school Our Lady of Remedios High School, Nerul. Idolising Spanish Gerard Pique, Mathew's passion won him a place in Goa's Santosh Trophy squad in 2008. Mathew was also part of the India team at the Special Olympics Asia Pacific.
