= Marra, Goa =

- village
- Location in Goa, India Marra, Goa (India)
- Coordinates: 15°31′53″N 73°49′13″E
- Country: India
- State: Goa
- District: North Goa
- Taluka: Bardez

Government
  - Type: Panchayat

Languages
  - Official: Konkani
- Time zone: UTC+5:30 (IST)
- Vehicle registration: GA 03
- Nearest city: Mapusa
- Lok Sabha constituency: North Goa
- Website: goa.gov.in

Marra is a small village in North Goa's Bardez sub-district or taluka. It falls in the Assembly constituency of Saligao. It is surrounded by the areas of Candolim and Pilerne, among others.

== Area, population ==
According to the 2011 Census, Marra has an area of 326.56 hectares, and a population of 516 households comprising 1,988 persons. Of these 1,029 are male and 959 are female. Children up to six years of age comprise 189 persons in this locality, of whom 99 are male and 90, female.

== Clean village ==
In December 2018, Pilerne-Marra village panchayat won the clean village award for North Goa.

== Panchayat ==
The local panchayat (village authority) in Marra is jointly run with neighbouring Pilerne. It has a presence on Facebook.

== Local groups ==
Local activist groups in the area include the Pilerne Citizens' Forum, which has raised issues of local governance and fairness of decision-making. Given the area's proximity to the fast-urbanising area of Porvorim, many land-related debates have come up in the region.
