= Joseph Furtado =

Portuguese poet and novelist (1872–1947)

- Born: 7 April 1872; Pilerne, Goa, Portuguese India
- Died: 1 January 1947 (aged 74); Bombay, British India
- Occupations: Poet; novelist
- Years active: 1890s–1940s
- Spouse: Rosa de Souza (m. 1897)

Joseph Furtado (7 April 1872 – 1 January 1947) was Portuguese poet and novelist who wrote in the English language. He has been praised as "one of Goa's best poets", albeit now "in the shadows, pushed to the margins and somewhat forgotten".

Born in Goa, then part of Portuguese India, his writings are difficult to access today, and many anthologies overlook his contribution.

== Biography ==
Furtado was the son of Vicente Cesar and Maria Conceicao de Rocha, Furtado was born in 1872 at Furtadovaddo, Pilerne, Bardes, in Portuguese Goa. A Goan Catholic, he began his education in Goa (then part of Portugal), but later attended boarding and arts schools in India. On 2 February 1897, he married Rosa Maria Amhimizia de Souza; among his sons was Philip Furtado. He worked, usually for railways companies, as a draughtsman, agent, and chief engineer, moving for work between Goa, Bombay, Calcutta and Pune. Furtado died in 1947.

== Work ==
Furtado mostly wrote in English, though his 1927 critical study of the work of Mariano Gracias, Floriano Barreto, Nascimento Mendonca and Paulino Dias also included, under the title 'Primeiros versos', nine poems which he had written in Portuguese. Keki N. Daruwalla, in his introduction to the anthology of Indian English poetry Ten Twentieth Century Indian Poets, says Furtado was the first to see the potential of using Indian English in poetry. However,

While Furtado is best known as a rare early instance of an Indian writing poetry in dialect and pidgin, a practice less common in India than in West Africa or the Caribbean, such poems are rare among his nine volumes of verse. Furtado deserves attention because of his bilingualism and because, in a purposefully self-limited way, his poetry is often good. Working within late-Victorian and Edwardian conventions, his work reveals a sense of humour, the treatment of a variety of topics, including the spiritual, and lively personae.

Works are of poetry unless otherwise stated:

- The Poems of Joseph Furtado (1895)
- Poems (1901)
- Lays of Goa and Other Verses on Goan Themes (1910)
- Lays of Goa and Lyrics of a Goan: A Souvenir of the Exposition of St. Francis Xavier (1922)
- A Guide to the Convents and Churches in Old Goa (1922). Prose history.
- A Goan Fiddler (1926, in an Indian limited edition, and 1927 in England with an introduction by Edmund Gosse)
- Principais Poetos Goanos (Um Estudo Critico) (1927). Prose criticism, along with nine poems.
- The Desterrado (1929)
- Songs in Exile (1938)
- Golden Goa (1938). Prose fiction.
- Selected Poems (1942, in a limited edition, and 1967 in a revised edition by Philip Furtado)

Five of Furtado's poems are available as 'Five Poems: The Secret, Brahmin Girls, Only Shy, The Neglected Wife and Birds and Neighbours', The Caravan: A Journal of Politics & Culture, 1 June 2012, http://www.caravanmagazine.in/poetry/five-poems-secret-brahmin-girls-only-shy-neglected-wife-and-birds-and-neighbours.
