= Our Lady of Perpetual Succor (disambiguation) =

Our Lady or Ladies of Perpetual Succor (also succour) may refer to:

Art: The icon Our Lady of Perpetual Succor, depicting the Virgin Mary

Churches

- Cathedral of Our Lady of Perpetual Succour, Prizren
- Church of Our Lady of Perpetual Succour in Singapore
- Our Lady of Succour Church, Socorro, Goa, India
- Church of Our Lady of Perpetual Succour in Christchurch, New Zealand
- Our Lady of Perpetual Succour Church, Great Billing, Northamptonshire, England.

Schools

- Our Lady of Perpetual Succour Catholic Primary School in West Pymble, Sydney, Australia
- Our Lady of Perpetual Succour School in Cairo, Egypt
- Our Lady of Perpetual Succour High School in Chembur, Mumbai, India
- Our Lady of Perpetual Succor College in Concepcion, Marikina, Philippines
- Academia del Perpetuo Socorro in San Juan, Puerto Rico, USA

Theatre

- Our Ladies of Perpetual Succour, 2015 play based on The Sopranos
