= Salvador do Mundo =

- village
- Location in Goa, India Salvador do Mundo (India)
- Coordinates: 15.5326°N 73.8578°E
- Country: India
- State: Goa
- District: North Goa
- Elevation: 7 m (23 ft)

Languages
  - Official: Konkani
- Time zone: UTC+5:30 (ISTN)
- PIN: 403101
- Vehicle registration: GA-01
- Website: goa.gov.in

Salvador do Mundo (Portuguese for Saviour of the World) is a village in Bardez taluka, Goa, in India. The village is located south west of Socorro and east of Porvorim. The Mount has a Chapel, which is used to hold services during the Lenten Season.

== Geography ==
Salvador do Mundo is located at 15°31′57″N 73°51′28″E. It has an elevation of 7 metres

The school in Salvador do Mundo is known as Smt. Sunandabai Bandodkar High School, which is near the Village Panchayat. All Gram Sabha meetings are held in this school.

The pattos are covered by water on one side and paddy fields on the other. The area is hilly and mostly forested by teak, cashew and mango. The western part has paddy fields that is watered by a tidal creek that feeds into the Mandovi River.

== Religion ==
Church

The Salvador do Mundo Church (The Saviour of the World) was built in 1565. It is named after the patron Salvador do Mundo meaning "Saviour of the World". The main feast is on 6 August, which is the celebration of the feast of the Transfiguration of Jesus. The priest present in the church blesses the fields.

The church is among the oldest still standing in Goa. The Parish Priest of the church is Rev. Fr. James Alex Torres e Silva.

The official Chapels present in Salvador do Mundo are St. Rita (Donvaddo), St. Anne (Salem), Mãe De Deus (Paetona), St. Sebastian (Badem & Torda). The striking hallmark of the Mãe de Deus Chapel is the pulpit and the main altar. It belonged to the Dominican Fathers. The chapel celebrated 250 years in October 2016.
