= Paliem =

Paliem is a village name that may refer to:

- Paliem, Pernem, Goa
- Paliem, Bardes, Goa
