= Olaulim =

Olaulim Vhaule
- village
- Location in Goa, India Olaulim (India)
- Coordinates: 15°34′32″N 73°51′48″E
- Country: India
- State: Goa
- District: North Goa

Languages
  - Official: Konkani
- Time zone: UTC+5:30 (IST)
- PIN: 403 523
- Vehicle registration: GA
- Nearest city: Mapusa (8 km)
- Website: goa.gov.in

Olaulim is a scenic village in Bardez sub-district, North Goa, India. The village lies between the lush green hills that separate it off from Bastora and Porvorim on the West and the back waters of the Mandovi River on the East.

Also 3 km away is Pomburpa (the springs here are a popular tourist attraction which incidentally haven't been known to run dry even in the worst of summers) to the south and Aldona 6 km away in a north easterly direction. Those are the nearest villages with the Dr. Salim Ali Bird Sanctuary just across the river in Chorao.

The village of Olaulim had been home to survivors of the brutal World War 2 attack on Rangoon, Burma where many Goans had flourishing businesses. The Pinto and Rodrigues families are some of the few such surviving families that still exist in Olaulim. (details of the hardships faced by these families when fleeing Rangoon to return to Olaulim, Goa can be found in the book "Songs of the Survivors" by Yvonne Vaz Ezdani).
