= Moitem =

- Village
- Location in Goa, India Moitem (India)
- Coordinates: 15°37′15″N 73°53′51″E
- Country: India
- State: Goa
- District: North Goa

Languages
  - Official: Konkani
- Time zone: UTC+5:30 (IST)
- Postal code: 403503
- Telephone code: 00-91-832
- Vehicle registration: GA
- Nearest city: Mapusa
- Website: goa.gov.in

Moitem is a small village situated in the Bardez sub-district or taluka of Goa, which lies along the west-coast of India. It is in the vicinity of the Assonora water treatment plant, which caters to the water needs of much of North Goa.

== Area, population, literacy ==
Moitem is spread over 88.52 hectares, and has 190 households, with a population of 860 Of these, 420 are male and 440 are female. A total of 73 children are in the zero-to-six age group. Some 714 persons (374 males and 340 females) are literate in the village.

== Location ==
Mahindra Holidays chairman Arun Nanda has been quoted as describing their resort in 2016 in the locality as being on a greenfield site, in "Assonora is in Goa which is a very beautiful resort. It is over nearly 50 acres of land, it will be a very different experience something Indian tourist have not seen before. Totally family focused."

== RTI case ==
Moitem village was in the news in May 2019, when additional collector and appellate authority Dasharat Redkar ruled in a Right to Information case that citizens would no longer have to pay "exorbitant fees"—of Rs 51 per photocopied page—when seeking documents pertaining to the Goa government's revenue department under the Right to Information Act. This case was filed by Swapnesh Sherlekar over from agricultural to non-agricultural, in Moitem village of Bardez, for commercial purposes by the Mahindra Holidays and Resorts India Limited.
