= Canca, Goa =

Village in North Goa, India

Coordinates: 15.584°N 73.800°E

Canca is a village located in the North Goa taluka (sub-district) of Bardez.

== Location ==
It is located to the south-west of Mapusa town, just on its outskirts. Surrounding Canca are Khorlim, Morod (both in Mapusa on its north and east respectively), Parra to its south, and Verla to its west.

== Locality, PIN, etc ==
Canca's PIN (postal index number) code is shared with Mapusa, 403507.

It is not to be confused with another locality called Cansa, in the Tivim area also in Bardez, Goa.

== Area ==
The village has an area of 81.09 hectares, according to the Goa Census of 2011.

== Population ==
It has a total of 794 households, and its population comprises 3,551 persons, of whom 1,845 are male and 1,706 are female. Its under-six population comprises 398 children, of whom 205 are boys and 193 are girls.
