= Nadora =

- village
- Location in Goa, India Nadora (India)
- Coordinates: 15°40′31″N 73°52′28″E
- Country: India
- State: Goa
- District: North Goa
- Taluka: Bardez

Government
  - Type: Panchayat

Languages
  - Official: Konkani
- Time zone: UTC+5:30 (IST)
- PIN: 403513 (Colvale)
- Vehicle registration: GA 03
- Nearest city: Mapusa
- Lok Sabha constituency: North Goa
- Website: goa.gov.in

Nadora is a village at one end of the North Goa taluka, or sub-district, of Bardez. It is divided by the Colvale river from the northernmost Goa taluka of Pernem or Pednem. It lies between Pirna to its east, and Revora to its west.

== Area, population ==
Nadora covers an area of 509.96 hectares. It has a total of 295 households within its village area. In all 1,257 persons live in Nadora, comprising 648 males and 609 females. There are 120 children aged under six, 59 boys and 61 girls, according to the 2011 Census.

== Flooding, waterlogging in 2019 ==
In 2019, the Revora-Nadora area was in the news after an island called the Raneache Juvem in the locality flooded due to torrential rain.

Incessant water-logging was also reported during 2019 in the village.

It is located approximately 21 metres (69 ft) above sea level and falls in the Tivim Goa Assembly constituency.
