= Punola =

Village in Goa, India

- Village
- Location in Goa, India Punola (India)
- Coordinates: 15.58°N 73.80°E
- Country: India
- State: Goa
- District: North Goa
- Elevation: 7 m (23 ft)

Languages
  - Official: Konkani
- Time zone: UTC+5:30 (IST)
- Vehicle registration: GA
- Website: goa.gov.in

Punola is a small village or hamlet in the North Goa sub-district or taluka of Bardez. It is near the village panchayat of Ucassaim, and St. Elizabeth's Church lies just outsides its boundaries.

== Area and population ==
Punola has an area of 69.41 hectares, and 199 households. Its population is 864 persons, of whom 445 are male and 419 female. 95 residents are under six years old, 47 boys and 48 girls.

== Government ==
Punola is part of the Ucassaim-Paliem-Punola village panchayat.

== Village classification ==
Some call Punola a ward (or vaddo) of Ucassaim but for census purposes, it is treated as a separate village.
