= Verla, Goa =

Village in the Bardez sub-district of Goa

Coordinates: 15°35′14″N 73°47′16″E

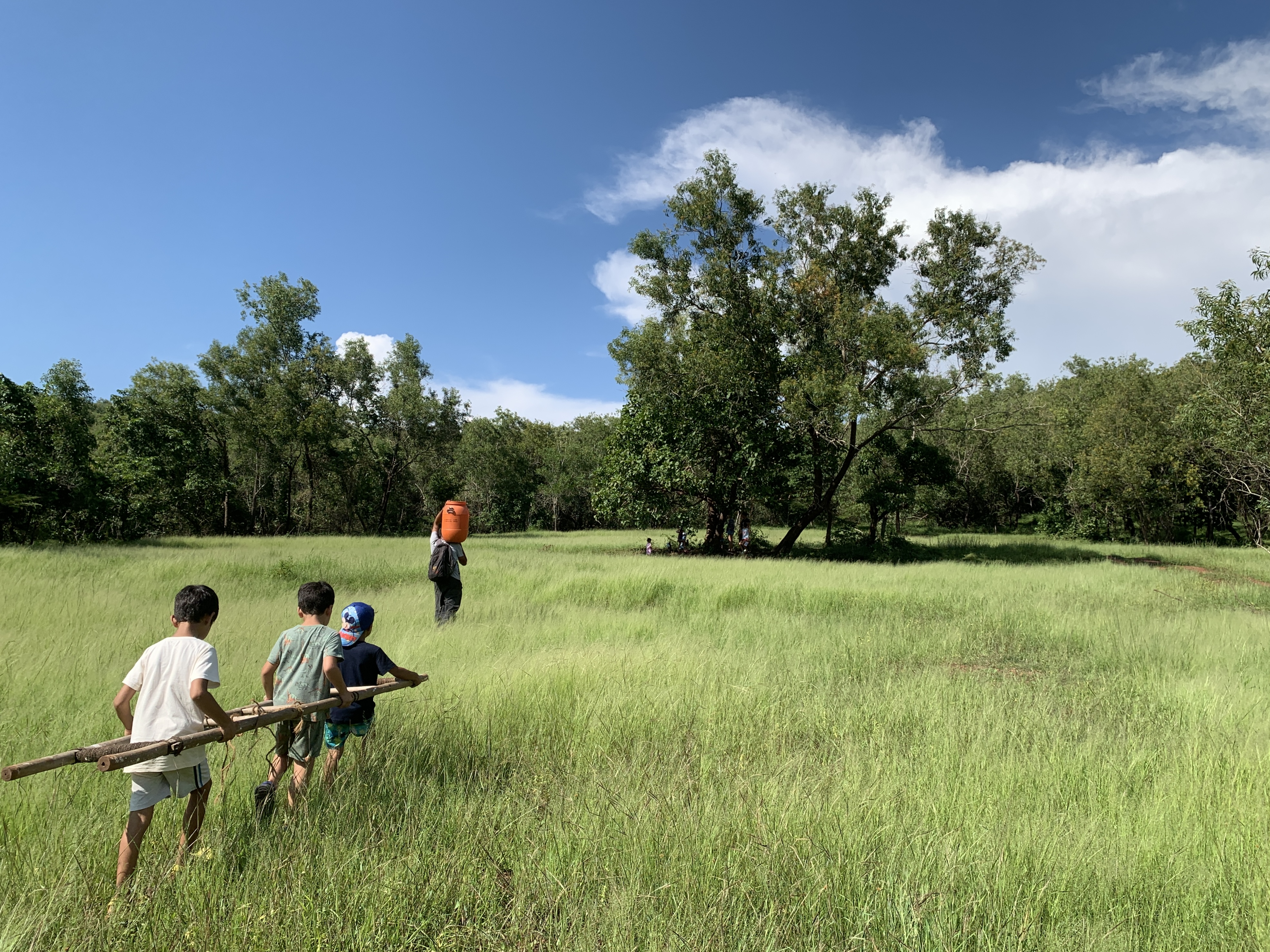
Children exploring the grasslands at Verla post monsoon

Verla is a village in the Bardez sub-district of Goa. It is located on the outskirts of Mapusa town.

Verla has an area of 354.35 hectares (875.6 acres). At the 2011 official census of Goa, there were 858 households with a population of 3,685 (1,890 are males and 1,795 females). Its under-six population was 403 (206 boys and 197 girl)s.
