= Sangolda =

- Village
- Location in Goa, India Sangolda (India)
- Coordinates: 15.542097°N 73.821381°E
- Country: India
- State: Goa
- District: North Goa

Languages
  - Official: Konkani
- Time zone: UTC+5:30 (IST)
- Vehicle registration: GA
- Website: goa.gov.in

Sangolda is a village in Bardez sub-district, North Goa, India.

== Location ==
Nearest airport is Dabolim Airport and railway station is at Tivim.

== Religion and culture ==
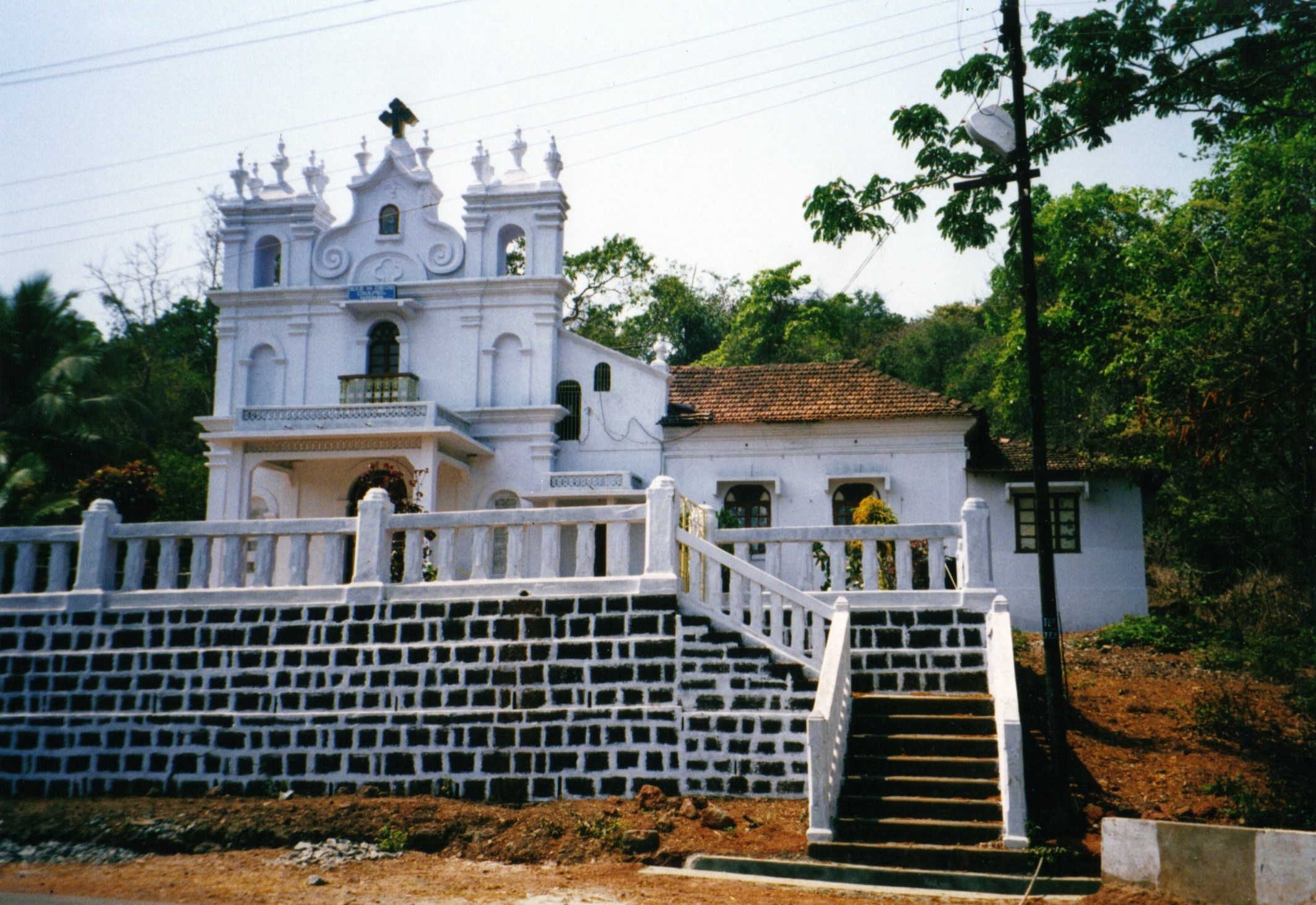
Photograph of Mae de Deus chapel before 2010
