= Reis Magos =

- Village
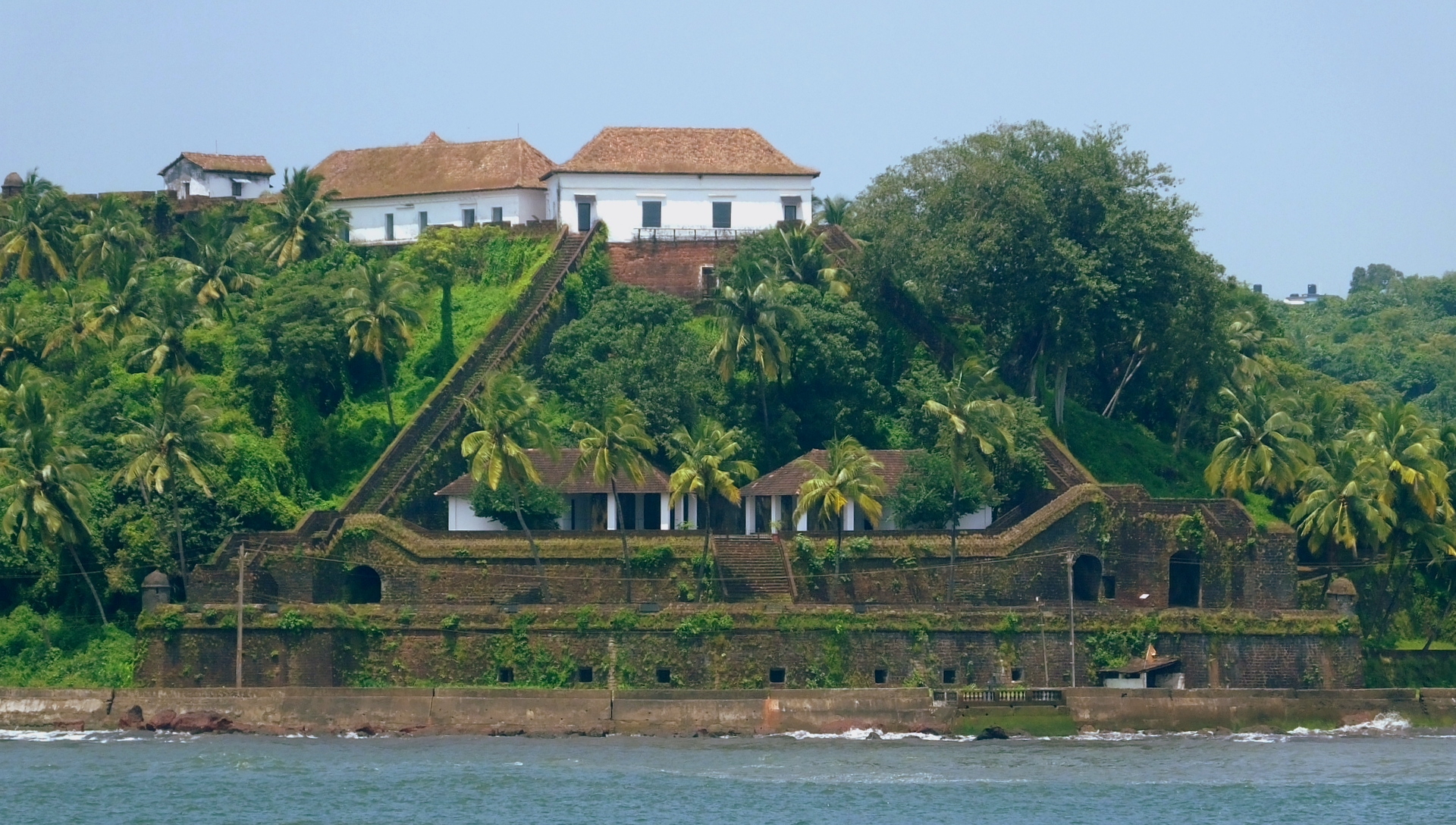
- Reis Magos Fort

- Location of Reis Magos in Goa Reis Magos (India)
- Coordinates: 15°29′49″N 73°48′32″E
- Country: India
- State: Goa
- District: North Goa
- Sub-district: Bardez

Population (2001)
  - Total: 8,698
- Time zone: UTC+5:30 (IST)
- Postcode: 403114
- Area code: 0832

Reis Magos is a village located on the northern bank of the Mandovi River in Bardez, Goa, opposite to the capital city of Panjim. The village is famous for two of Goa’s famous structures; the Reis Magos Fort, and the Reis Magos Church – the first church in Bardez. "Reis Magos" is the Portuguese name for the Three Wise Men from the Bible.

== Reis Magos Fort ==
The Reis Magos Fort predates Fort Aguada by half a century and is situated on a headland overlooking the Mandovi River, facing the capital city of Panjim. The Fort, which is surrounded by laterite walls and Portuguese turrets, was erected in 1551 to protect the narrowest point at the mouth of the Mandovi estuary. It was enlarged subsequently on different occasions and finally re-erected in 1707. The fort formerly accommodated viceroys and other dignitaries newly arrived from, or en route to, Lisbon. In the early eighteenth century, it played a significant role in the wars against the Hindu Marathas, who were never able to capture it. The fort was later used as a prison. Though far inferior in size to the fortress of Mormugao, its position provides extensive views. It is in a good state of preservation and is defended by 33 guns and accommodation for a small garrison. A spring located at a short distance towards the east has abundant water, while the church of the Reis Magos is located at its base and is accessible by a flight of steps.

This edifice was built on the ruins of a pagoda in 1550 by the Franciscans, with the sum allotted to them by the Government, and bears a crown on its façade, and the royal arms on its sanctuary and other places. The pavement is dotted with inscriptions, the most important of which, found in the sanctuary, indicated the spot enclosing the remains of Dom Luís de Ataíde, Count of Athoughia, who twice held the position of Viceroy of Portuguese India and Goa. This Fort stands on the north bank of the Mandovi at Reis Magos, and is very much visible from the Panjim side of the Mandovi river. It was used as a residence for viceroys and later converted to a fortress. It was occupied briefly between 1798-1813 by the British Army. It was subsequently abandoned by the military and served as a prison until 1993.

== Reis Magos Fort Restoration ==
The Fort, originated as an armed outpost of the Adil Shah of Bijapur in 1493. When Bardez was conquered by the Portuguese in 1541, the Fort was built along with the church. From 1900, it lost its defensive role and was used as a jail and was finally abandoned in 1993 after which it was at the mercy of the elements, and had begun to crumble. Restoration work on the fort began in 2008 with the funds being provided by the UK-based Helen Hamlyn Trust, INTACH - a non-governmental organisation dealing with restorations of monuments, and the Government of Goa. Renowned architect Gerard da Cunha was hired to restore the fort. The fort is now converted into a cultural centre, besides being used a tourist attraction.

== Demographics ==
As of 2001 India census, Reis Magos had a population of 8,698. Males constitute 55% of the population and females 45%. Reis Magos has an average literacy rate of 78%, higher than the national average of 59.5%: male literacy is 82%, and female literacy is 73%. In Reis Magos, 11% of the population is under 6 years of age.

== Gallery ==
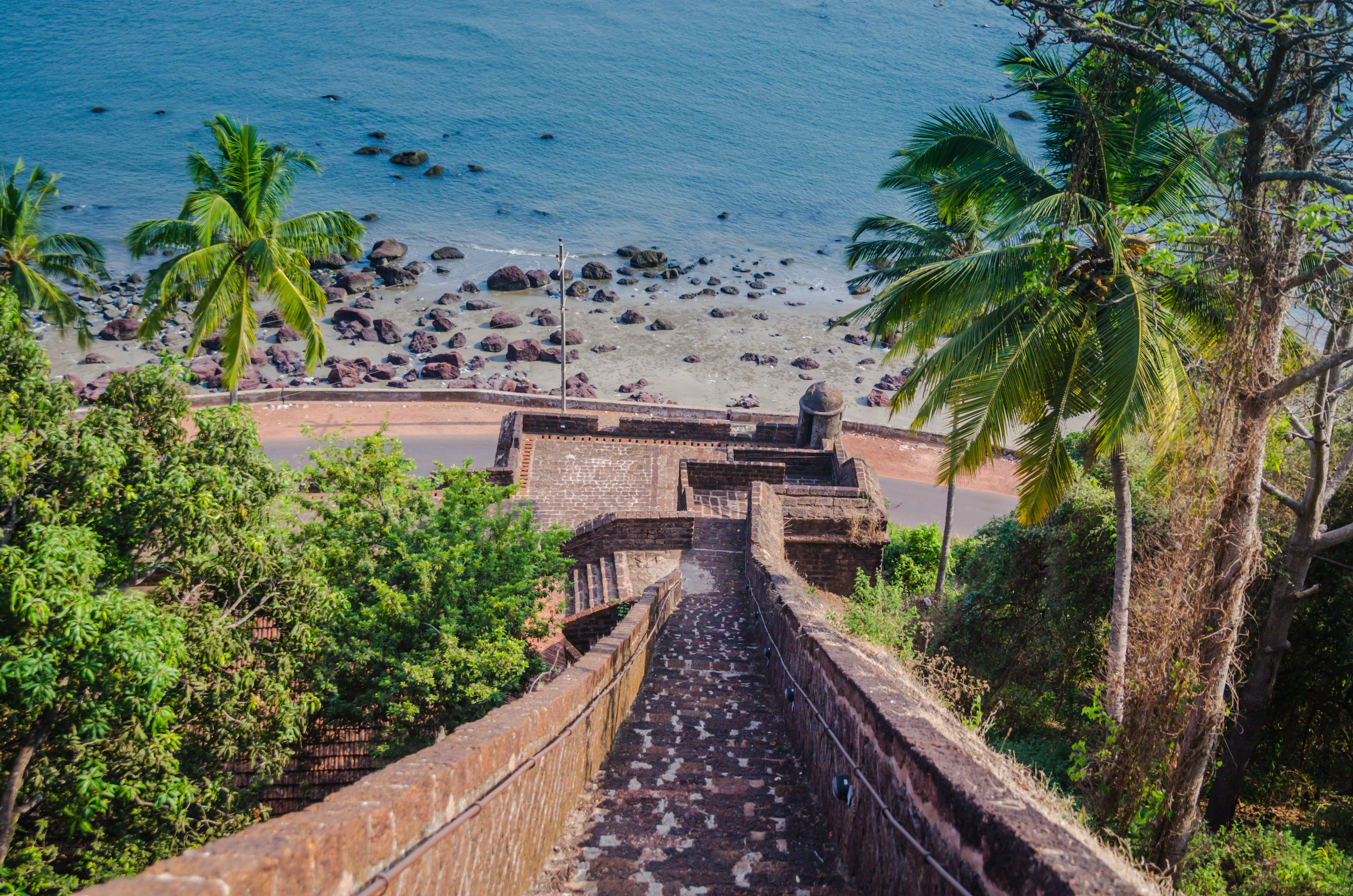
Reis Magos Fort

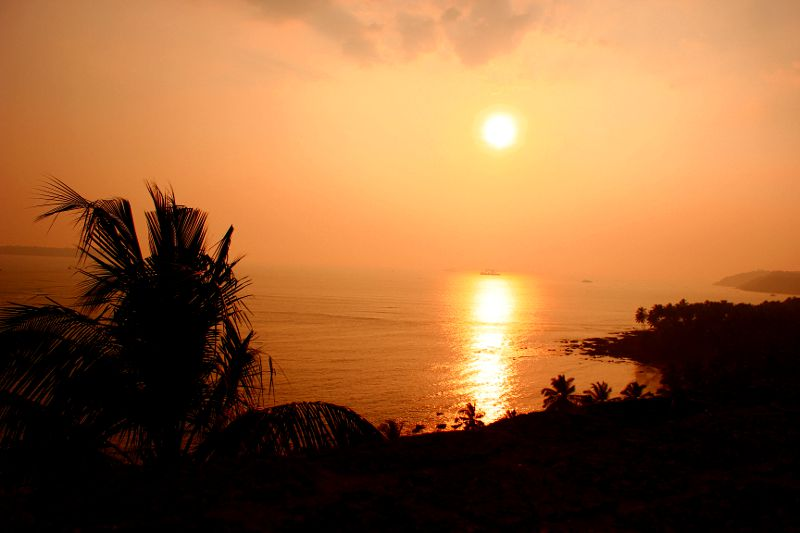
Sunset view from Reis Magos

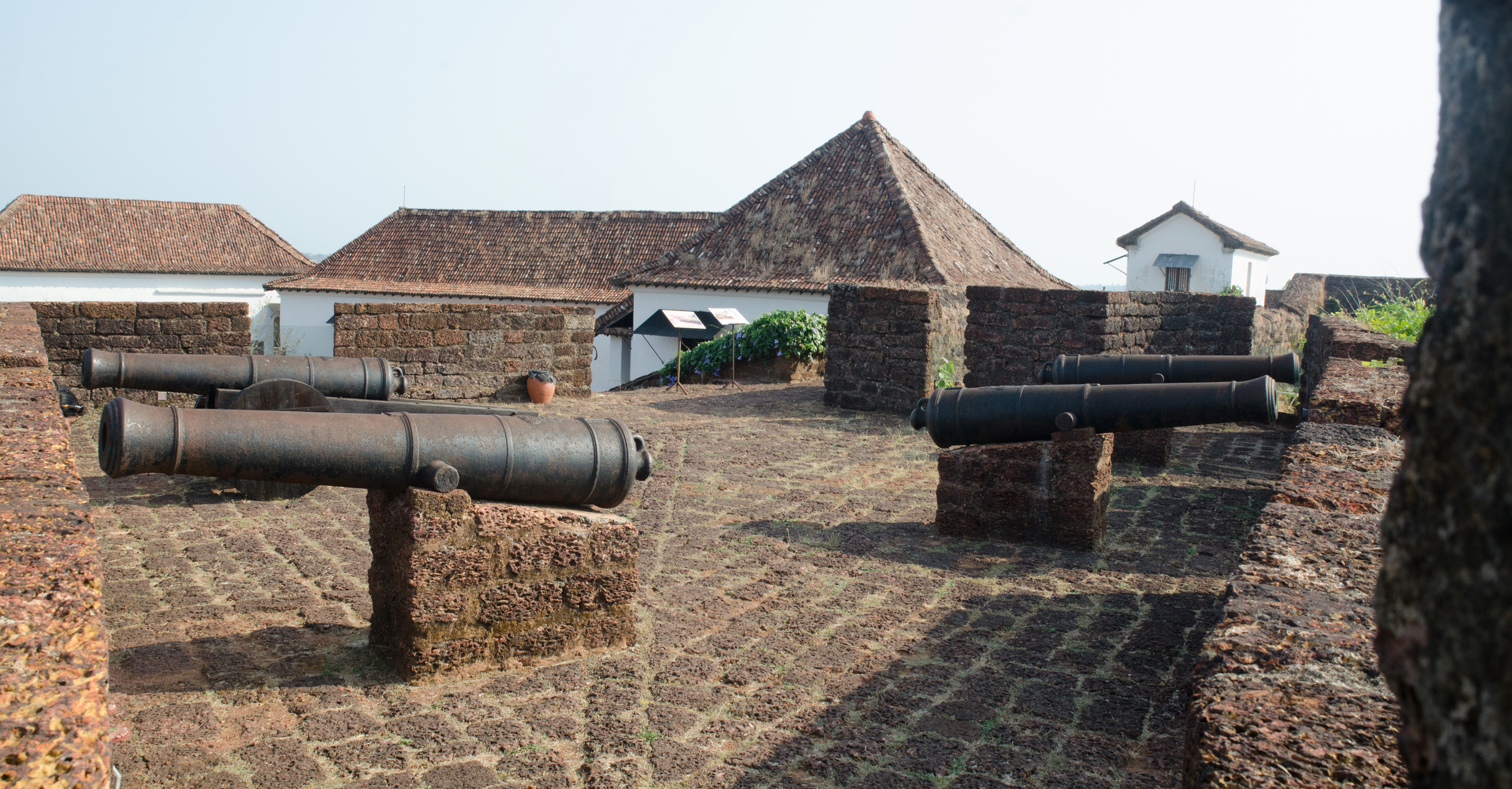
Cannon at Reis Magos Fort

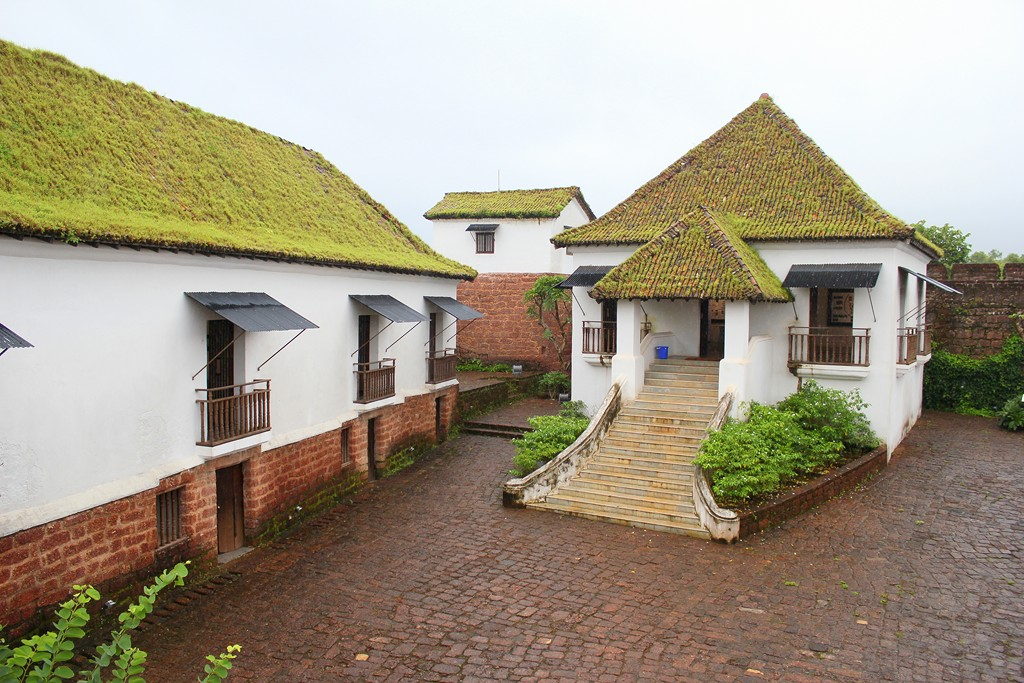
Renovated Reis Magos Fort

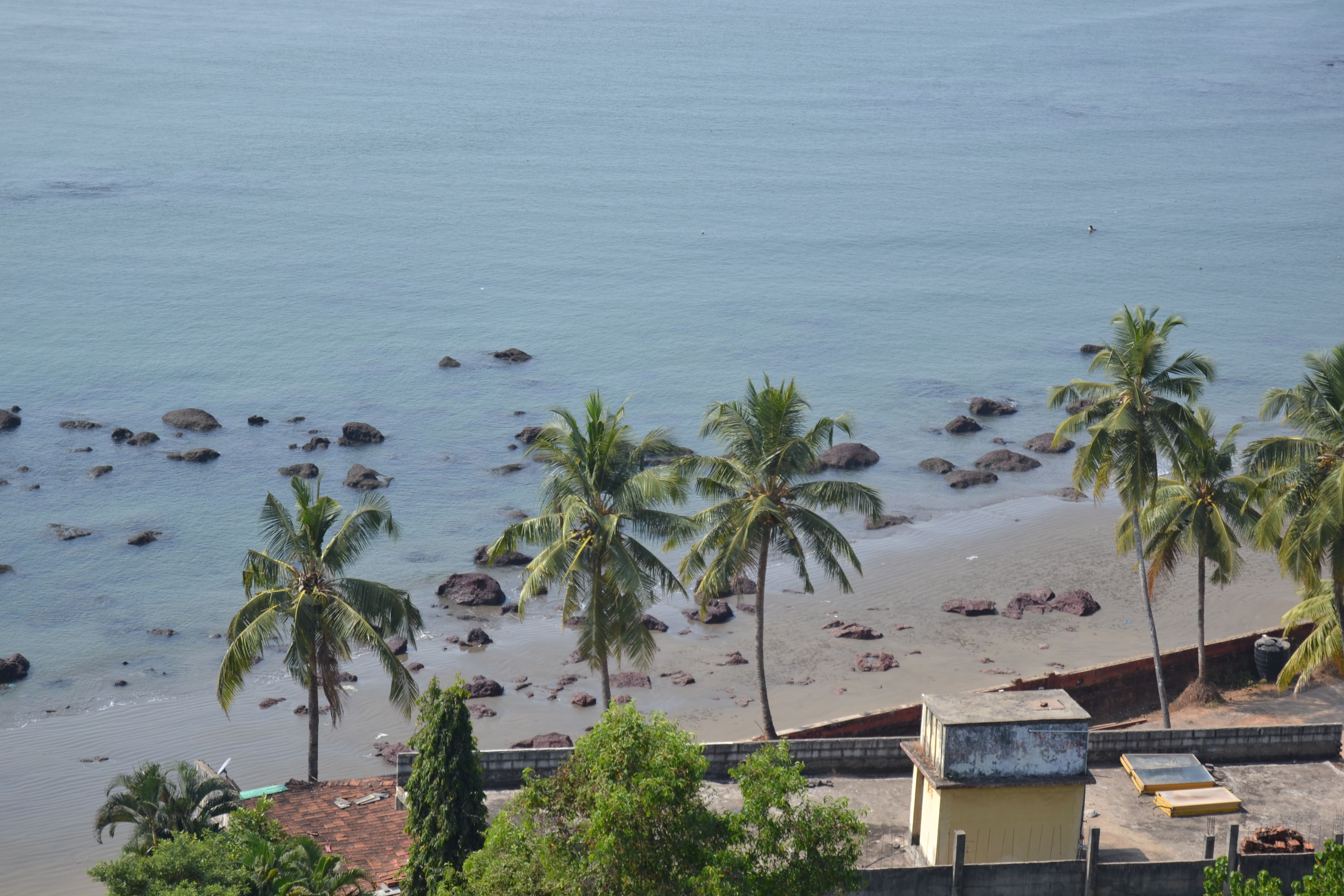
Reis Magos beach

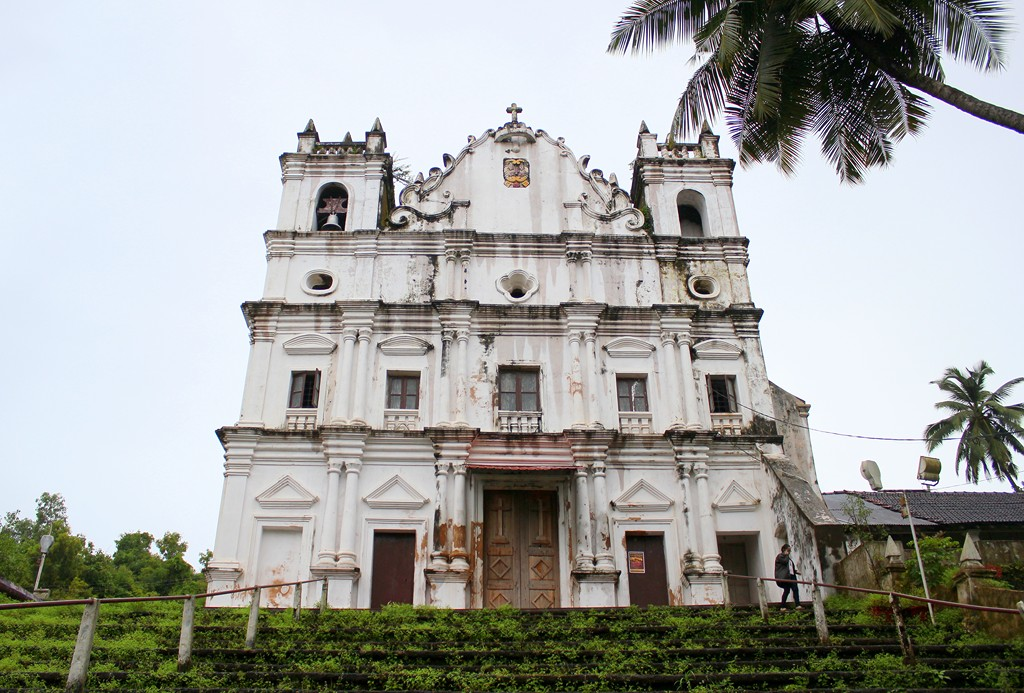
A church in Reis Magos
