= Bardez taluka =

Taluka in North Goa, India

Bardez Konkani: Bardes
- Taluka
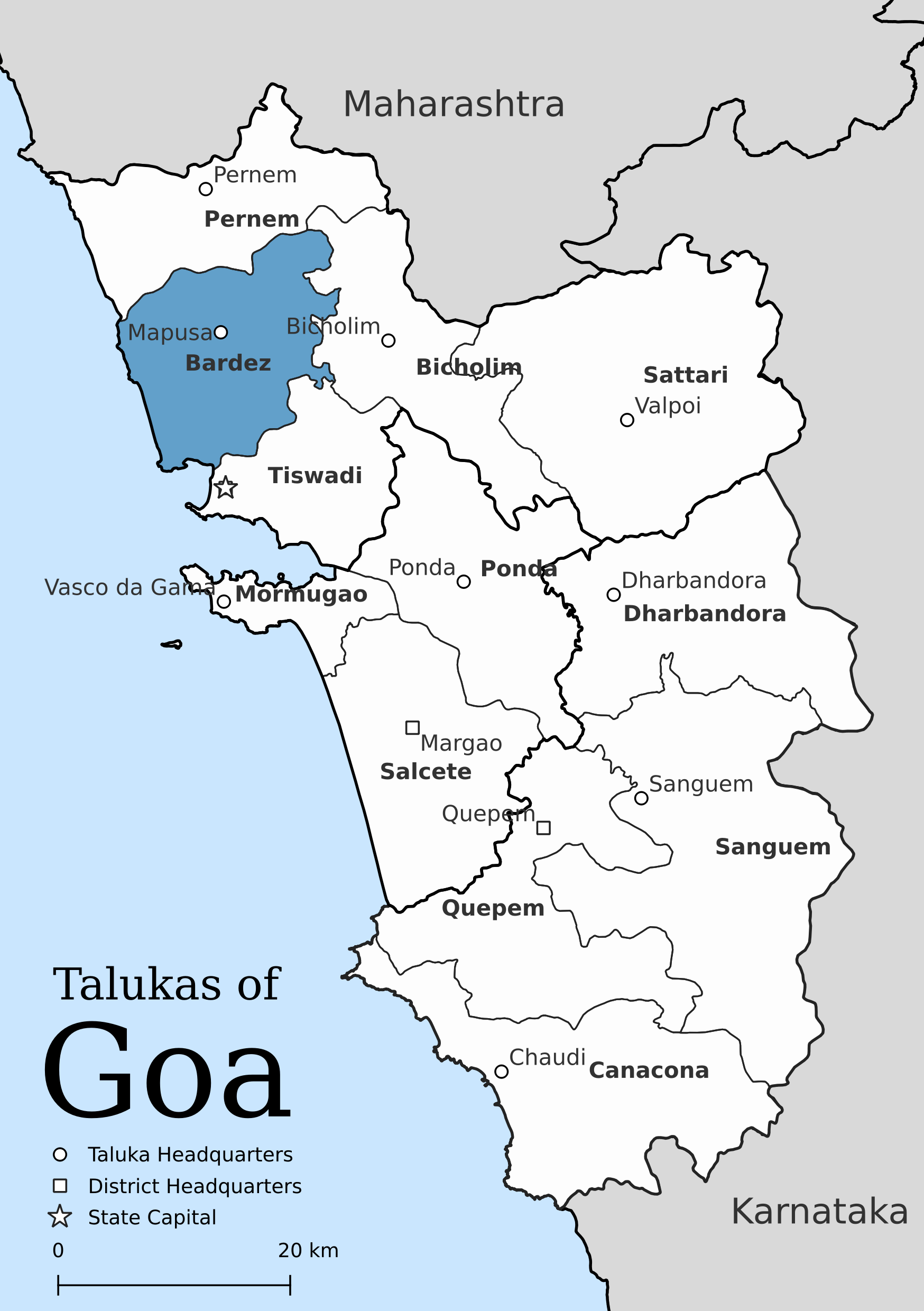
- Location of Bardez in North Goa district in Goa
- Coordinates: 15.589407°N 73.818305°E
- Country: India
- State: Goa
- District: North Goa
- Headquarters: Mapusa
- Settlements: 1 City; 15 Towns; 28 Villages

Government
  - Tehsildar: na
  - Lok Sabha constituency: North Goa
  - MLA: na

Area
  - Taluka: 263.98 km^{2} (101.92 sq mi)

Population (2011)
  - Taluka: 237,440
  - Density: 899.46/km^{2} (2,329.6/sq mi)
  - Urban: 68.69%

Demographics
  - Literacy rate: 82.55%
  - Sex ratio: 980
- PIN: 4031XX, 4032XX, 4035XX
- Vehicle registration: GA-03
- Rain: na

Bardez or Bardes (IPA: /'baːɾdeːs/) is a taluka of the North Goa district in the Indian state of Goa.

== Etymology ==
The name is credited to the Saraswat Brahmin immigrants who emigrated to the Konkan via Magadha plains in northern India. Bardez, or more properly bara (twelve) desh (country), means "twelve countries" (or territories). The form 'country' probably refers to clan territorial limits, or to the Brahmin comunidades, of which the twelve are:

1. Aldona
2. Anjuna
3. Assagao
4. Candolim
5. Moira
6. Nachinola
7. Olaulim
8. Pomburpa
9. Saligao
10. Sangolda
11. Serula
12. Siolim

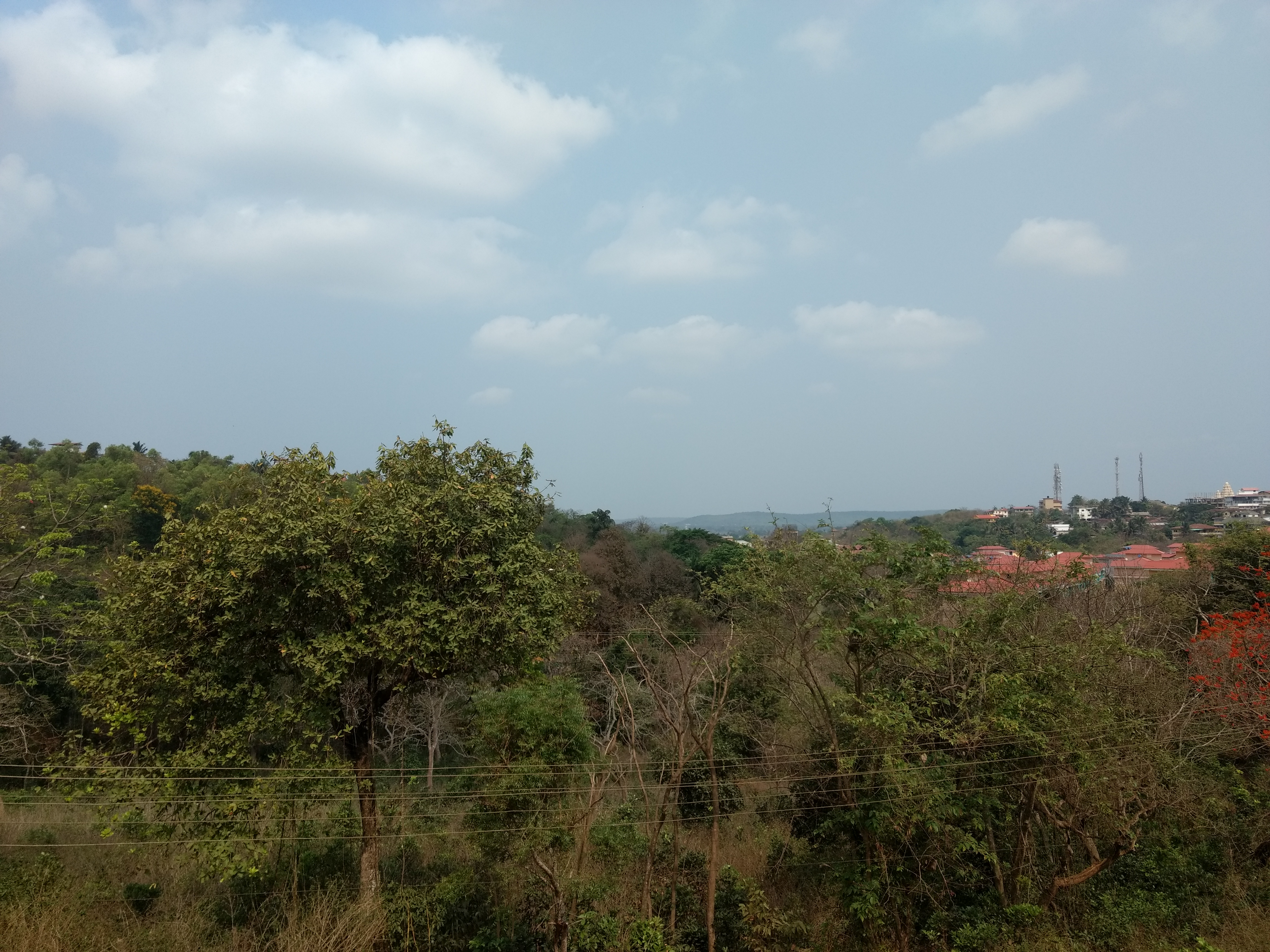
View of a valley in Bardez

Bardez is delimited on the north by the Chapora River, on the south by the Mandovi River, on the east by the Mapusa River, which originates in Bardez itself near the capital city of Mapusa, and on the west by the Arabian Sea.

A native of Bardez is called a Bardeskar or Bardescar (IPA: /'baːɾdeːskaːɾ/) in the Konkani language.

Bardez is the site of the legislature of Goa, in the southern parish village of Penha de França (Britona), in Serula. Other famous sites are the Fort Aguada, the beaches of Candolim, Sinquerim, Calangute, Baga, Anjuna, and Vagator villages, the hilltop monastery and boarding school of Monte Guirim, which was restored by Padre Luna after Pombal's devastation, the village communities of Salvador do Mundo, Penha da França, Siolim, Moira, Porvorim, Colvale, Saligao, and Sangolda, to name but the most prominent.

Goa's Indian Institute of Hotel Management (IIHM) and St Xavier's College, Mapusa are located in Bardez.

The village and comunidade of Anjuna was a prime hippie destination. Bardes is famous as the birthplace of Rev Fr Agnelo de Souza, who is expected be recognised for sainthood in the near future. He is one of the two most prominent religious Goan Christians, the other being St Joseph De Vaz, the "Apostle of Ceylon".

== Demographics ==
As per the 2011 Census of India, Bardez Taluka has a population of 237,440. The sex-ratio of Bardez Taluka is around 980 compared to state average of 973. The literacy rate of Bardez Taluka is 82.55% out of which 84.91% males are literate and 80.15% females are literate. Scheduled Castes and Scheduled Tribes make up 2.50% and 0.70% of the population respectively. 68.70% of the population lives in urban areas. The total area of Bardez is 263.98 sq.km with population density of 899 per sq.km.

=== Languages ===
Languages of Bardez Taluka (2011)
1. Konkani (68.6%)
2. Marathi (9.95%)
3. Hindi (7.88%)
4. Kannada (3.57%)
5. English (2.04%)
6. Urdu (1.78%)
7. Others (6.18%)

Majority of the population of Bardez Taluka speak Konkani as their mother tongue.

According to the 2011 Census of India, 68.60% of the population of Bardez Taluka spoke Konkani, 9.95% Marathi, 7.88% Hindi, 3.57% Kannada, 2.04% English and 1.78% Urdu as their first language.

=== Religion ===
Religion in Bardez Taluka (2011)
Religion	Percent
Hinduism	66.71%
Christianity	25.60%
Islam	6.96%
Other or not stated	0.73%

Hinduism is followed by the majority of the population of Bardez Taluka. Christians form a significant minority.

According to the 2011 Census of India, 66.71% of the population in Bardez Taluka follow Hinduism, 25.60% Christianity, 6.96% Islam and 0.73% follow other religions or did not state religion.

== List of towns and villages ==
List of towns in Bardez taluka:

- Mapusa
- Penha-de-Franca
- Calangute
- Socorro
- Siolim
- Anjuna
- Candolim
- Reis Magos
- Salvador do Mundo
- Saligao
- Aldona
- Pilerne
- Nerul
- Guirim
- Colvale
- Moira

List of villages in Bardez taluk:

- Arpora
- Assagao
- Assonora
- Bastora
- Calvim
- Camurlim
- Canca
- Corjuem
- Marna
- Marra
- Moitem
- Nachinola
- Nadora
- Nagoa
- Olaulim
- Oxel
- Paliem
- Parra
- Pirna
- Pomburpa
- Ponolem
- Punola
- Revora
- Sangolda
- Sircaim
- Tivim
- Ucassaim
- Verla

== In popular culture ==
The Indian Netflix original show, Typewriter, is set in Bardez.
