= Paliem, Bardes, Goa =

Coordinates: 15.573°N 73.816°E

Paliem is a village in the sub-district of Bardez in North Goa. It is not to be confused with the village of the same name, that lies in the sub-district of Pernem, a little further to its north.

According to the official 2011 Census, Paliem in Bardez has an area of 135.98 hectares, a total of 314 households, a population of 1,377 (comprising 778 males and 599 females) with an under-six years population of 125 (comprising 71 boys and 54 girls).

It shares a village panchayat with Ucassaim.
