= Saligao =

Saligão Sallganv
- village
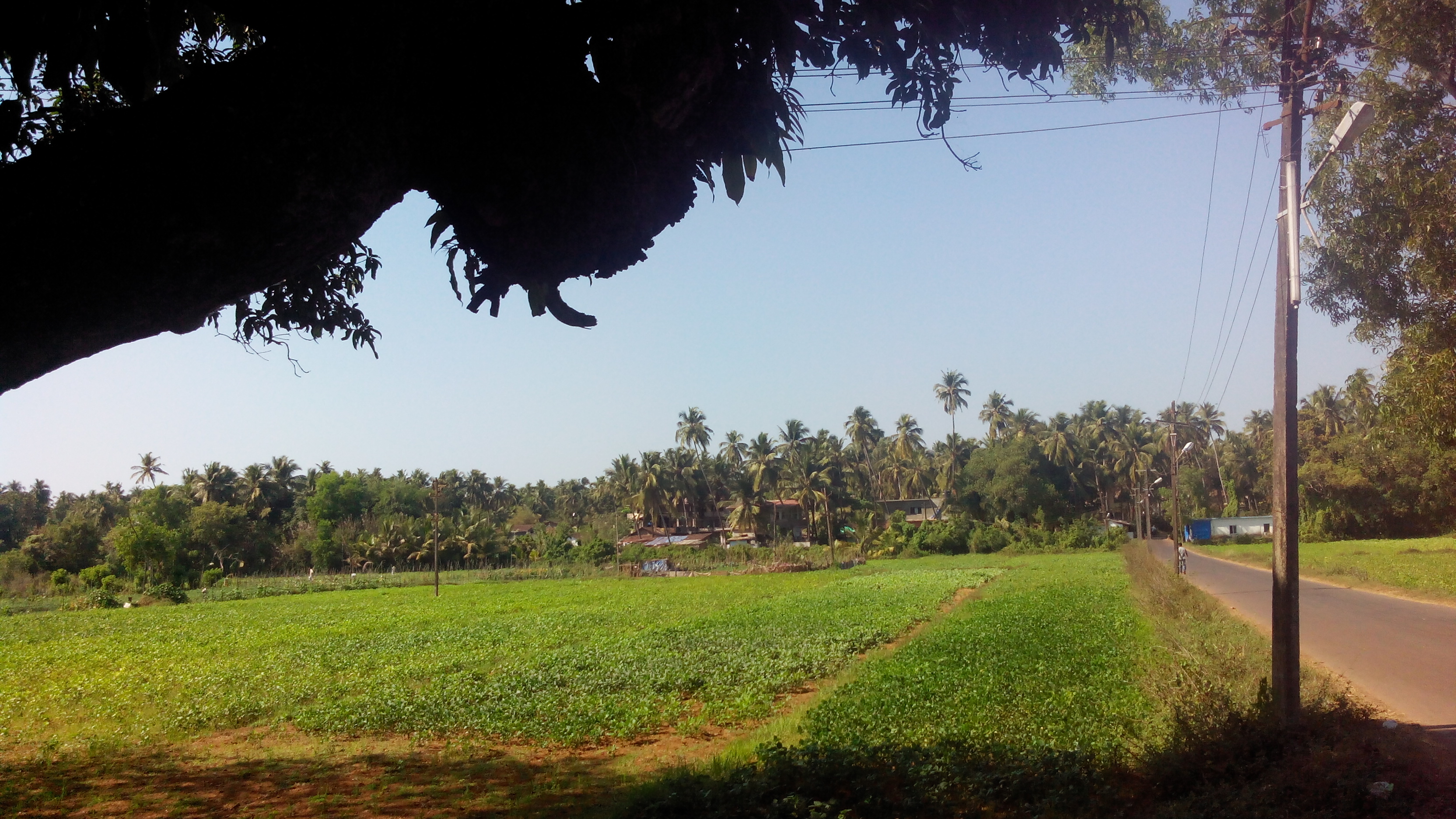

- Location in Goa, India Saligão (India)
- Coordinates: 15.55°N 73.77°E
- Country: India
- State: Goa
- District: North Goa

Government
  - Body: Panchayat
- Elevation: 9 m (30 ft)

Population (2011)
  - Total: 6,280

Languages
  - Official: Konkani
- Time zone: UTC+5:30 (IST)
- PIN: 403511
- Vehicle registration: GA
- Website: goa.gov.in

Saligão ([saːɭɡãːw]) is a census town in North Goa district in the Indian state of Goa. It is surrounded by the villages of Porvorim, Parra, Guirim, Sangolda, Pilerne, Candolim, Calangute and Nagoa and is in Bardez Taluka of Goa. It is 10 km from Panjim the capital of Goa, 6 km from Mapusa the capital of Bardez Taluka, and 3 km from the Calangute beach.

== Geography ==
Saligão is located at 15.55°N 73.77°E. It has an average elevation of 9 metres (30 feet).

== Government and politics ==
Saligao is part of Saligao (Goa Assembly constituency) and North Goa (Lok Sabha constituency).

== Demographics ==
As of 2001 India census, Saligão had a population of 5553. Males constitute 51% of the population and females 49%. Saligão has an average literacy rate of 82%, higher than the national average of 59.5%: male literacy is 87%, and female literacy is 76%. In Saligão, 8% of the population is under 6 years of age.

== Places of interest ==
- Mater Dei Institution, one of Goa's first English language schools, at Bairo Alto. Started as St. Mary's in 1900, the name was later changed to Mater Dei in 1909.
- Mãe de Deus Parish Church built in 1873.

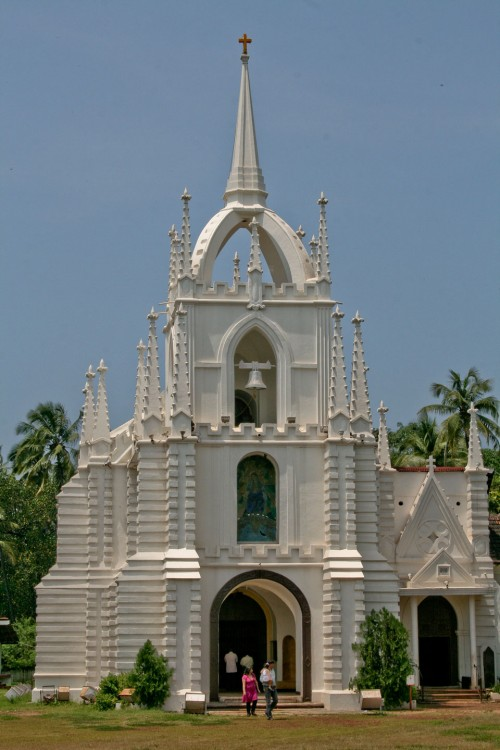
Mãe de Deus Parish Church

- Lourdes Convent High School at Sonarbhat
- Government Middle School at the CHOGM Road Crossing.
- Krist Raj Bhavan, home for the aged, run by the Franciscan Missionaries of Christ the King sisters.
- Mãe de Deus home for the aged, run by the Franciscan Missionaries of Christ the King sisters.
- Hindu temples including Sharvani (near the Saligão spring, Salmona), Dattatriya (at the Seminary Hill, Sonarbhat), Laxmi Narayan (near market area) and Vittal temple (near the border with Sangolda).
- Saligão Medical Centre, near the Parish Church. For now, it has a doctor (General Practitioner) only in the mornings. Diagnostic and other facilities available.
- Made in Saligão Market, held weekly on Tuesdays. It features products made in the village itself to promote talent from the area, and is organised by the Saligão Institute, a local institution set up in 1929.

== Village issues ==
In recent years, Saligão, which is just outside the North Goa beach-belt, has seen significant concerns over the large-scale sale of ground-water from a number of wells in the village, particularly at Donvaddo. There has also been concern raised by villagers over the dumping of garbage from the coastal belt on the hillock atop the village, partly on village lands and partly on land belonging to the Calangute comunidade but very close (and overlooking) the village. On 12 December 2002, a writ petition was filed over this issue in the Goa bench of the High Court of Bombay.

The petition challenged the selection of a garbage disposal site on the top of Saligão plateau, in the midst of a social forest plantation raised by the Goa government's Forest Department. It argued that the decision to locate the disposal site in this "inappropriate area" was made without following the procedures established by law, particularly the provision of Municipal Solid Waste Rules, 2000 issued under provisions of the Environment Protection Act, 1986. "The location is bound to have grievous consequences for the environment, health and water supplies," the petition filed by green lawyer Norma Alvares of the Goa Foundation argued.

On the groundwater issue, in May 2002, a study titled "Saligao's water crisis and commercial groundwater extraction" was released. Its summary said: "Extraction of groundwater for commercial sale outside the village has risen sharply in the last five years, to a level of up to 435,000 litres per day. Groundwater levels are falling, and wells for household use and for irrigating farmland are running dry in some parts of Saligao, although other parts of the village are unaffected. The problem is very serious for household wells in Don Vaddo and parts of Sonarbhat, and for farmers in Mollembhat. Enough consumers are suffering serious problems to merit the SCCC (Saligao Civic and Consumers' Cell) taking up commercial groundwater extraction as a community issue."

It noted that more than half of 28 household wells surveyed in Don Vaddo and Sonarbhat went dry in April/May 2001, a normal monsoon year. At least 138 consumers depend on these wells. Falling water levels in this area have coincided with a very rapid increase in commercial extraction from the local well.

== Gallery ==
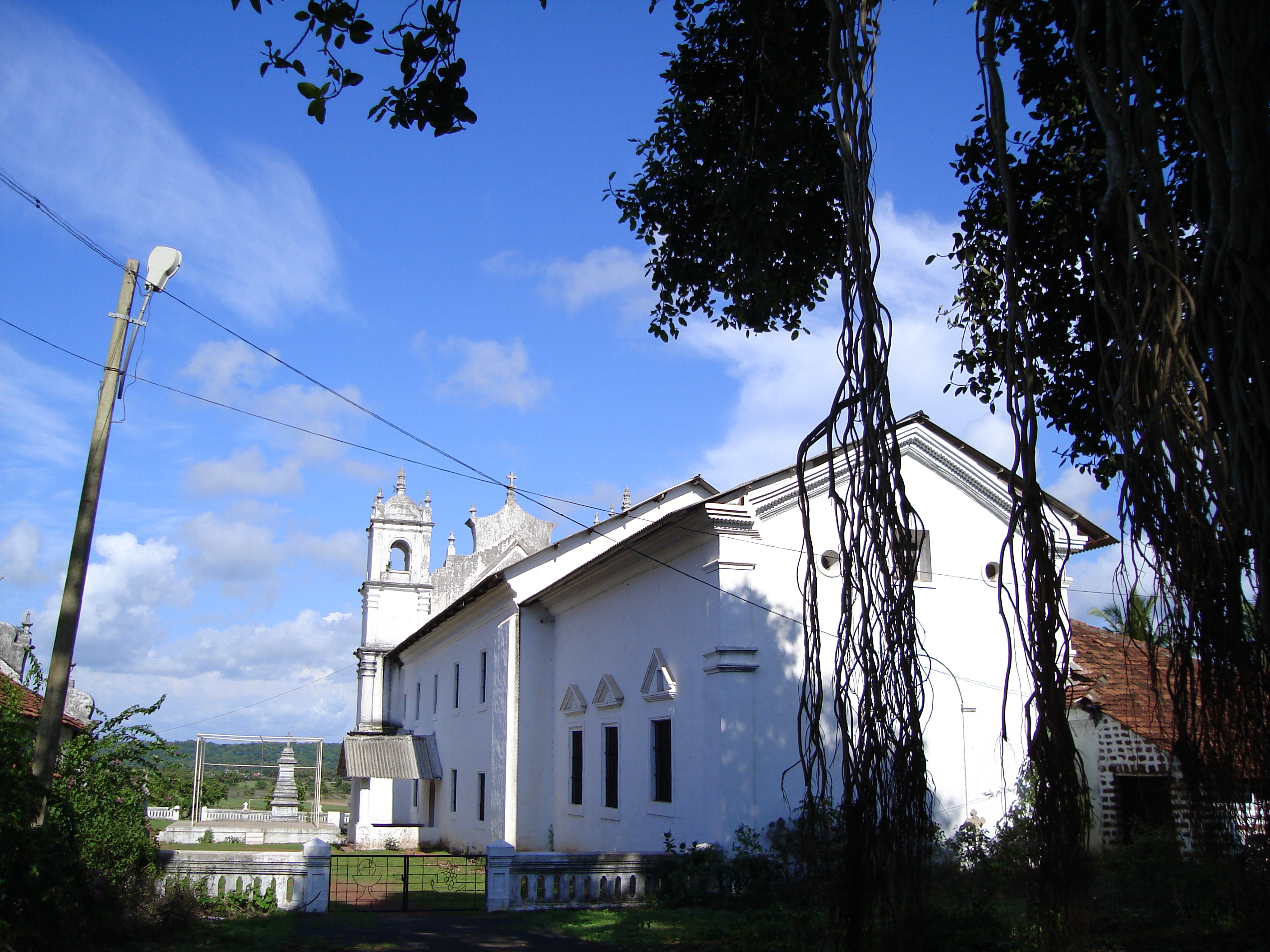
Guirim village, Goa. Saligao's neighbour.

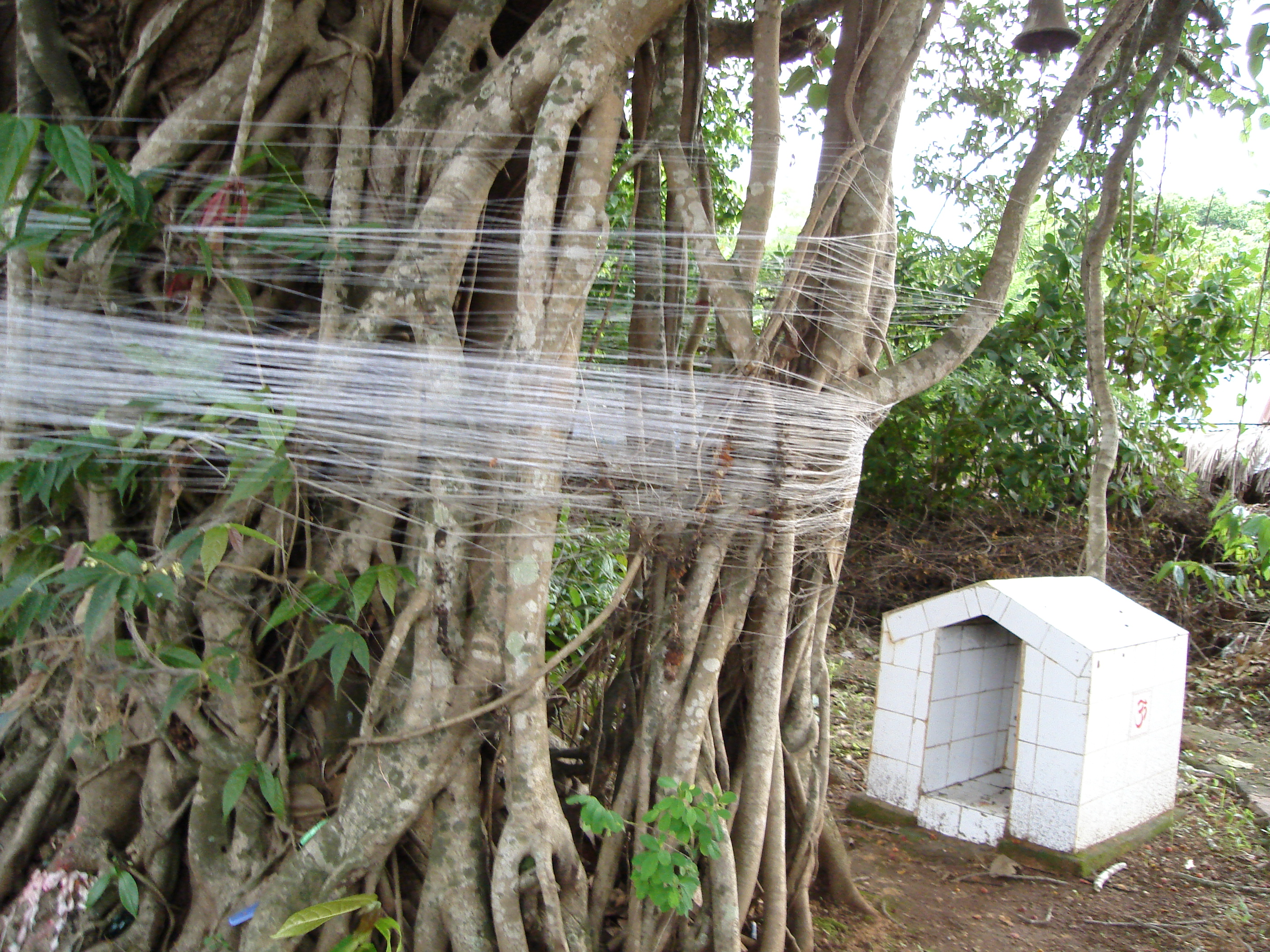
Religious shrine in Saligao.

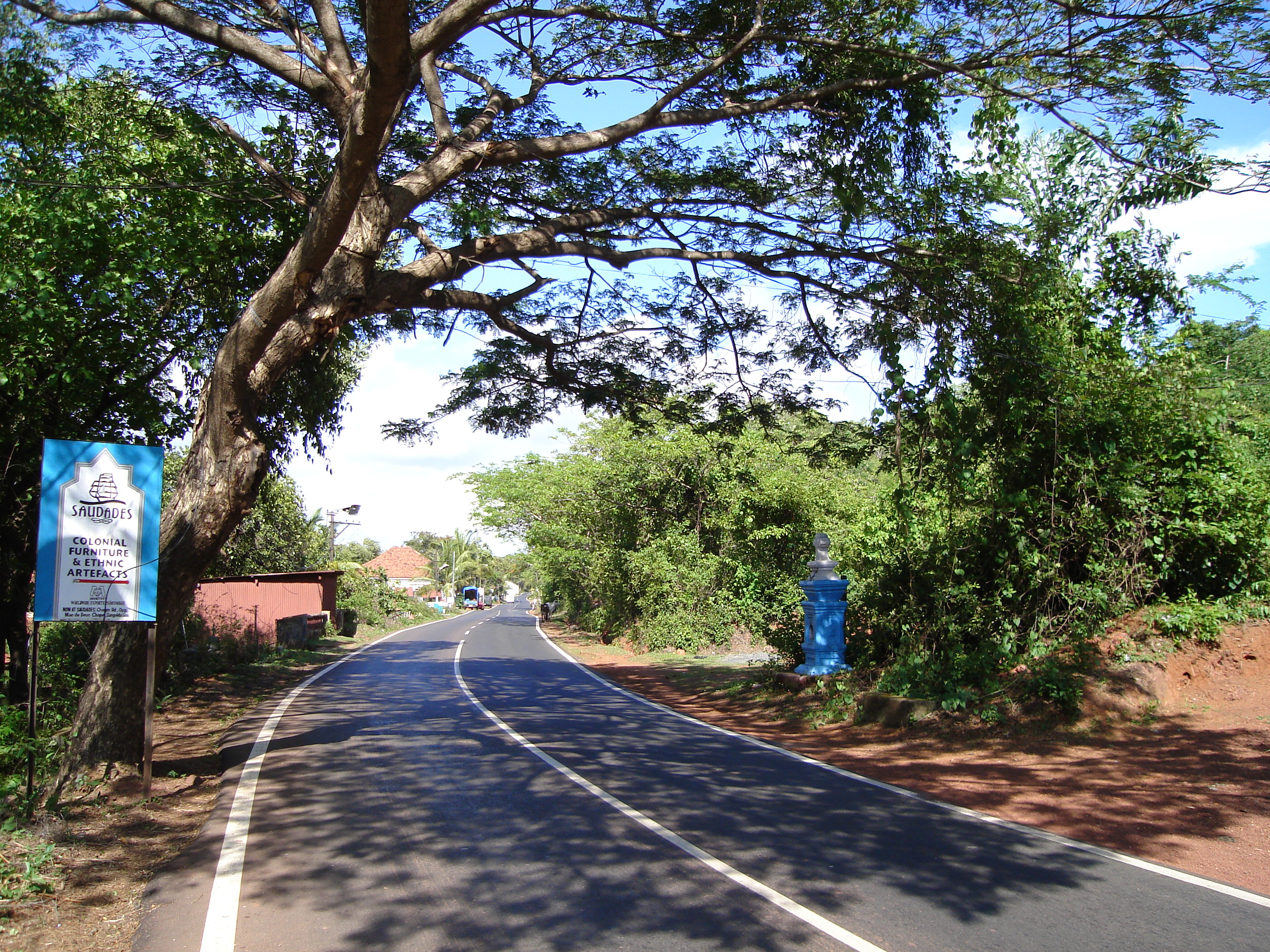
View from the village, road to the Seminary.

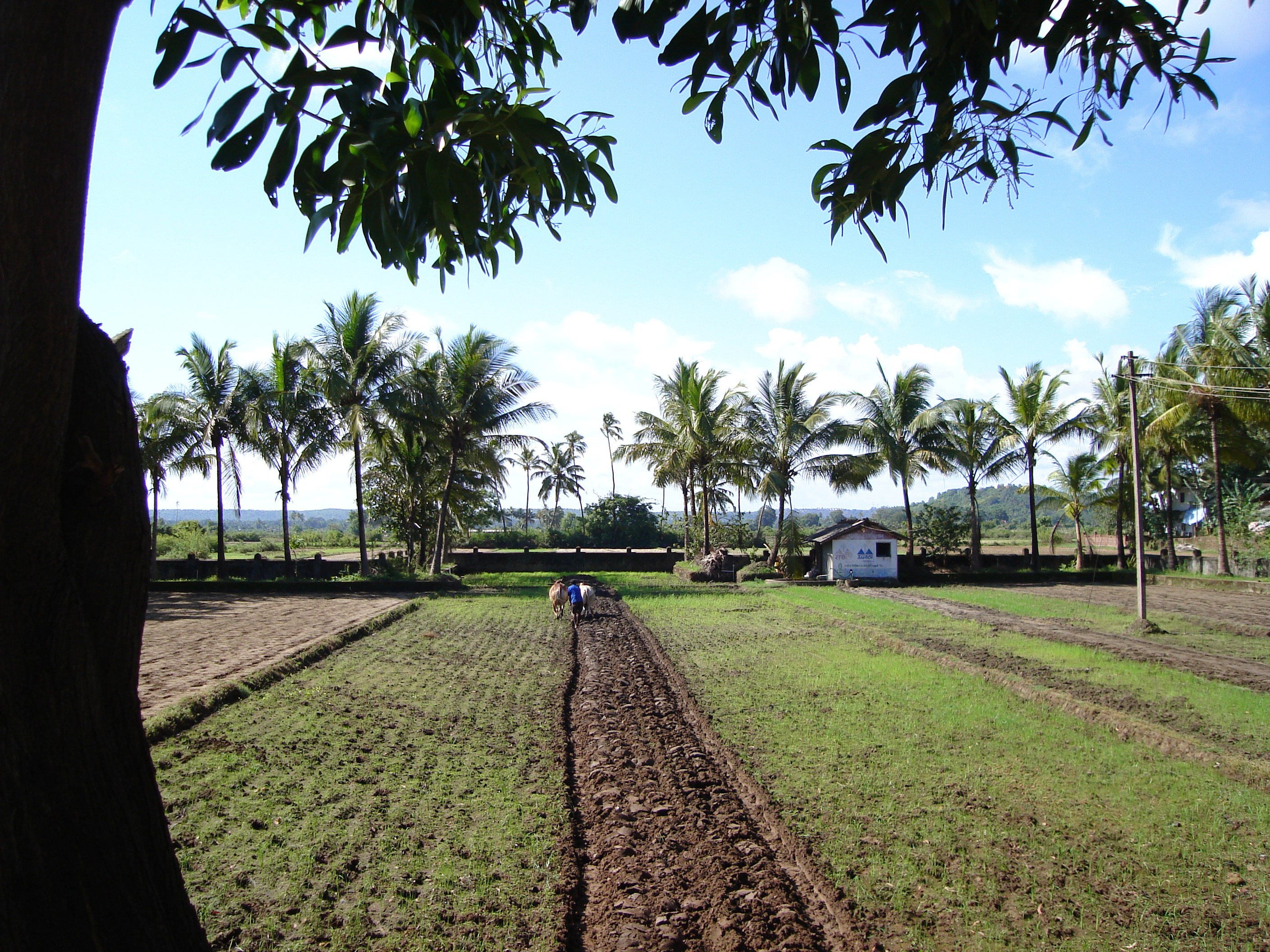
Fields in Saligao, Goa.

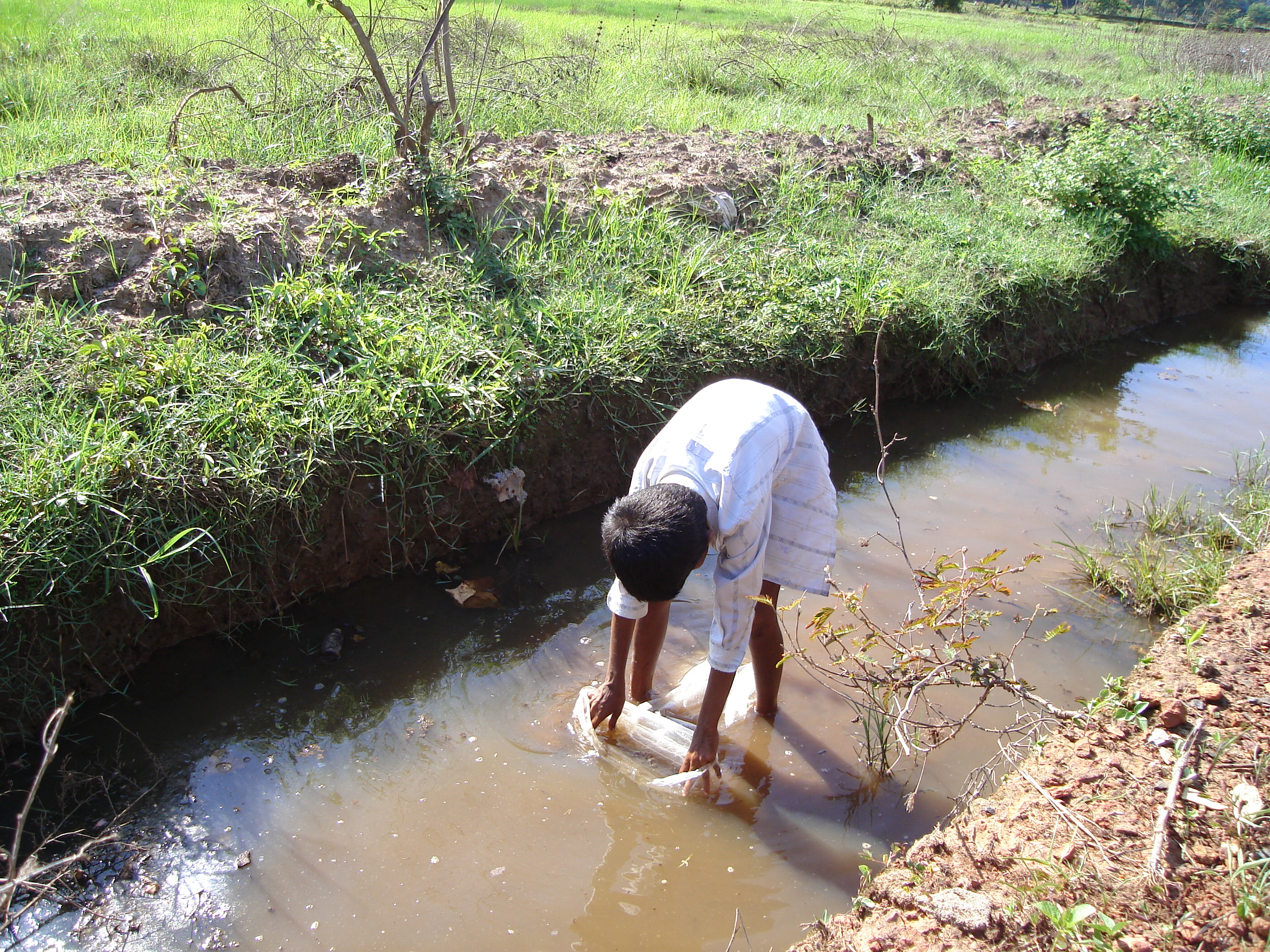
Stream in or near village Goa.

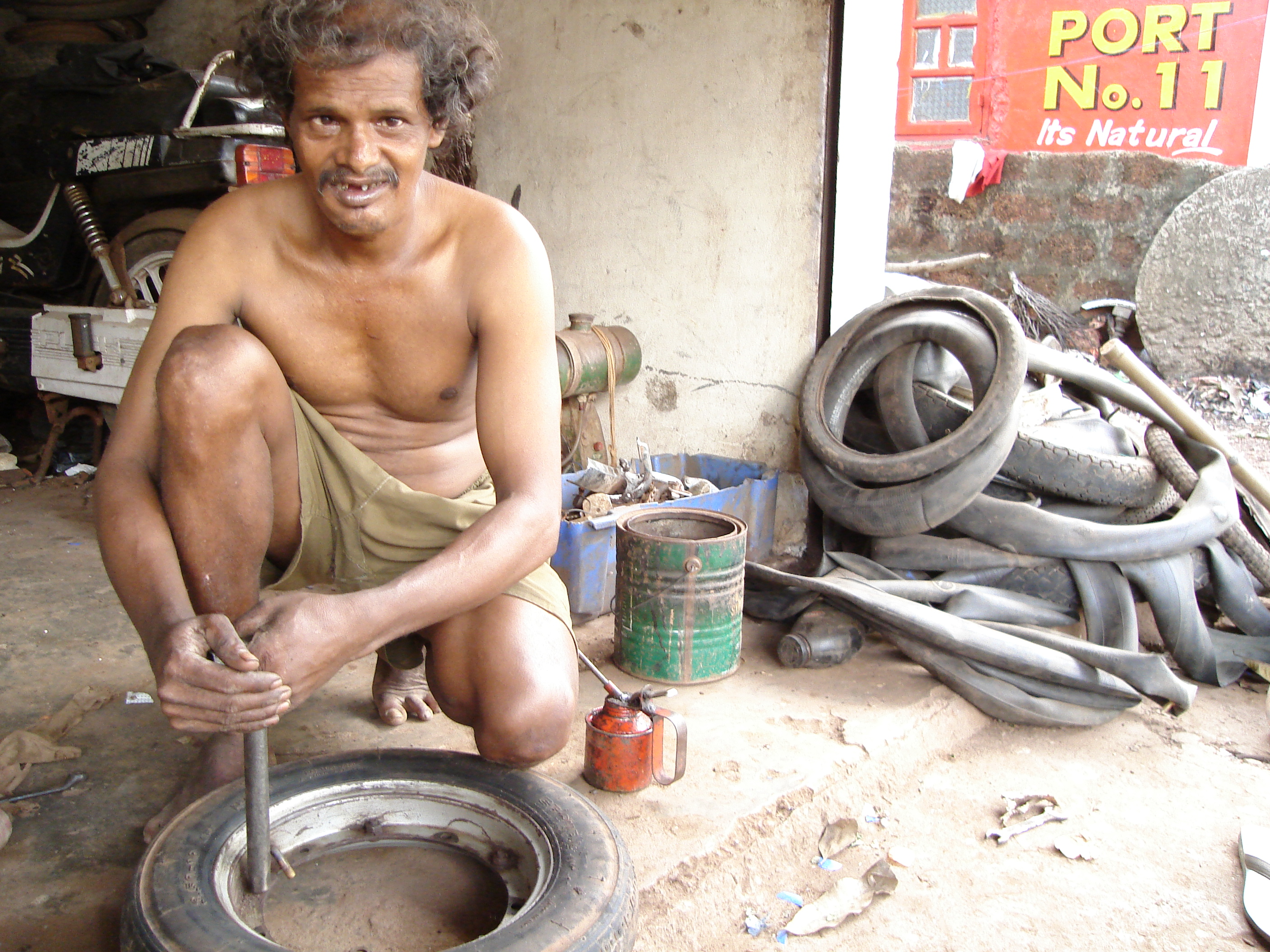
Two-wheeler puncture repairer in Saligao.

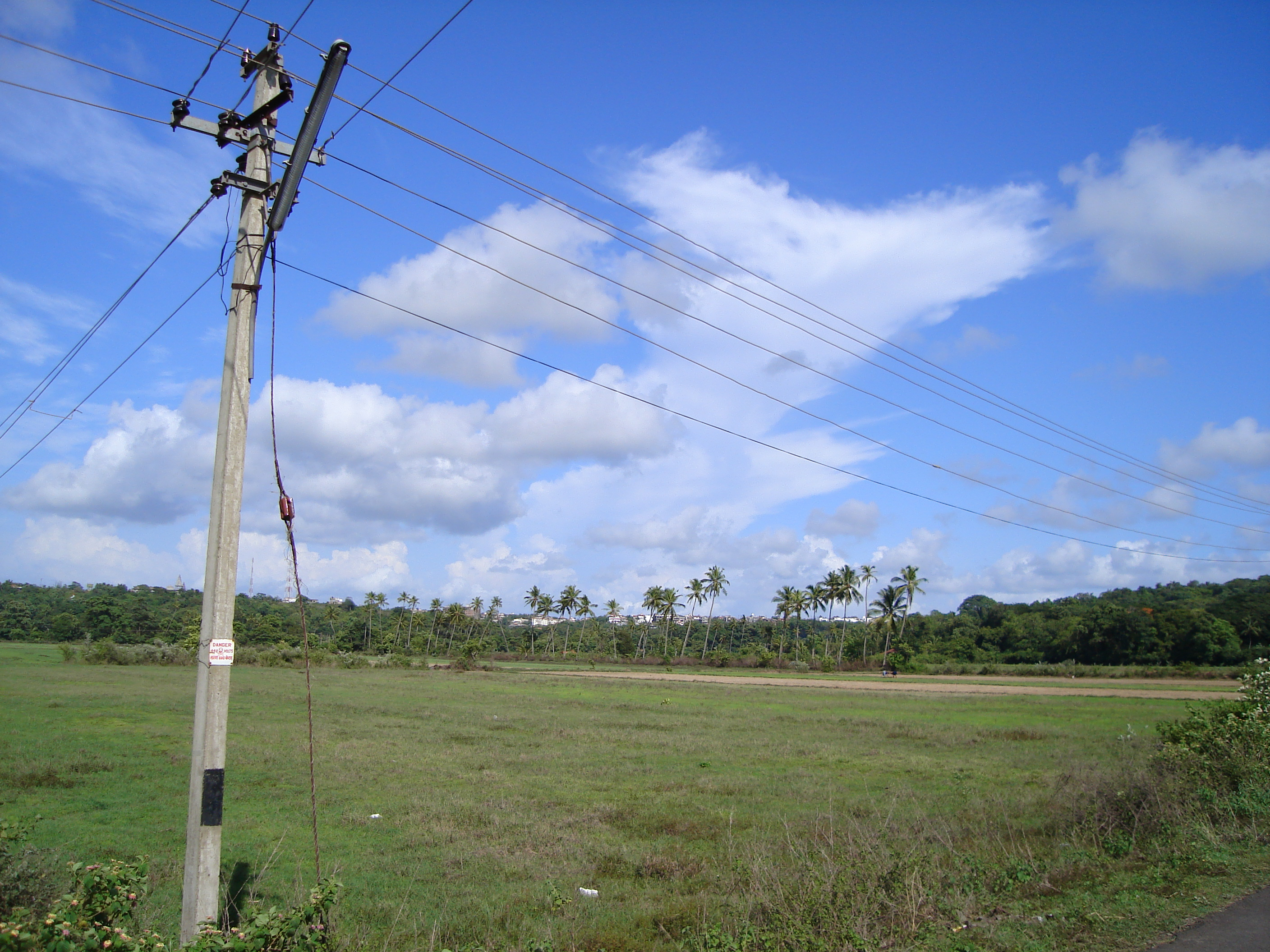
Village skies in Saligao.

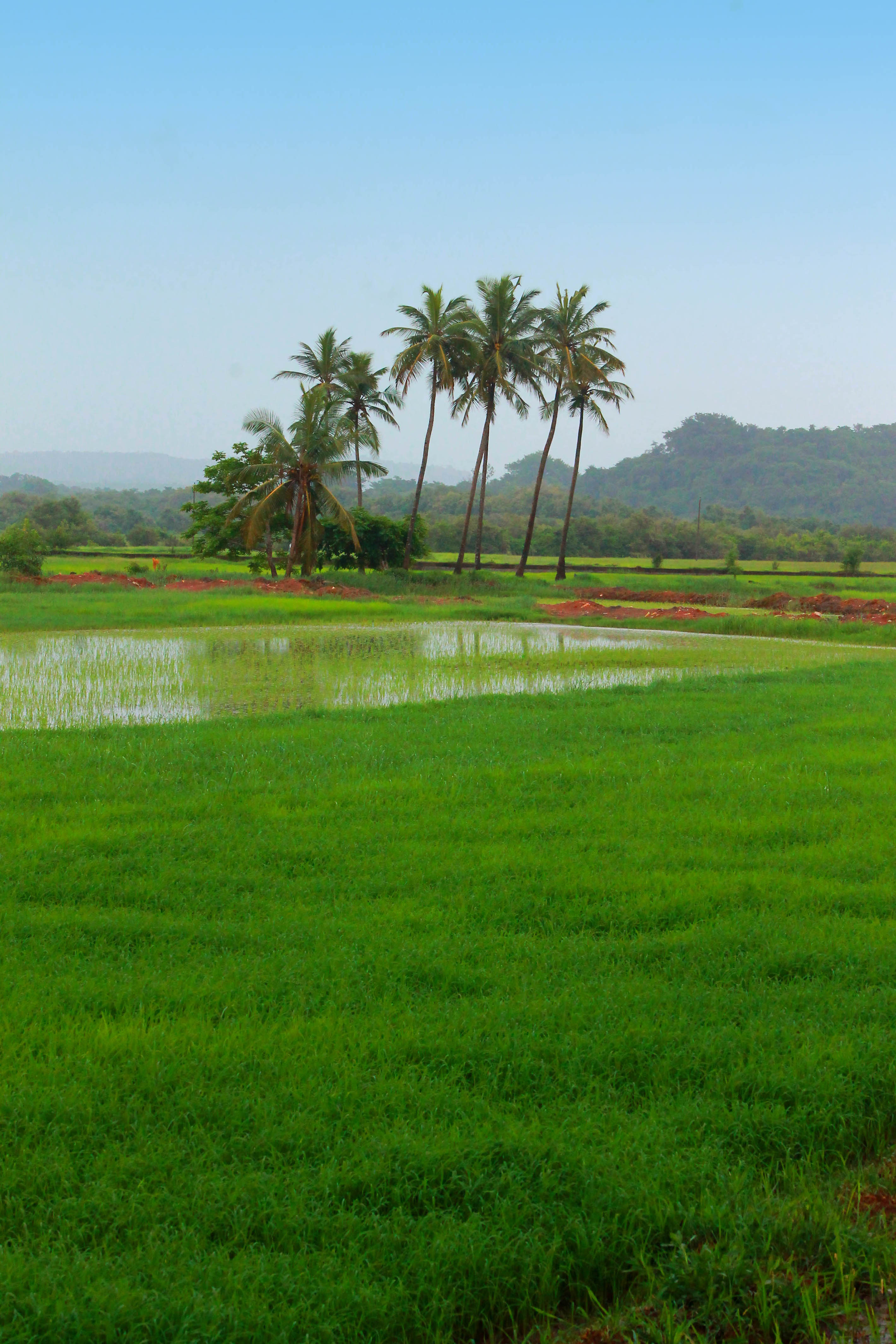
View of Saligao field.

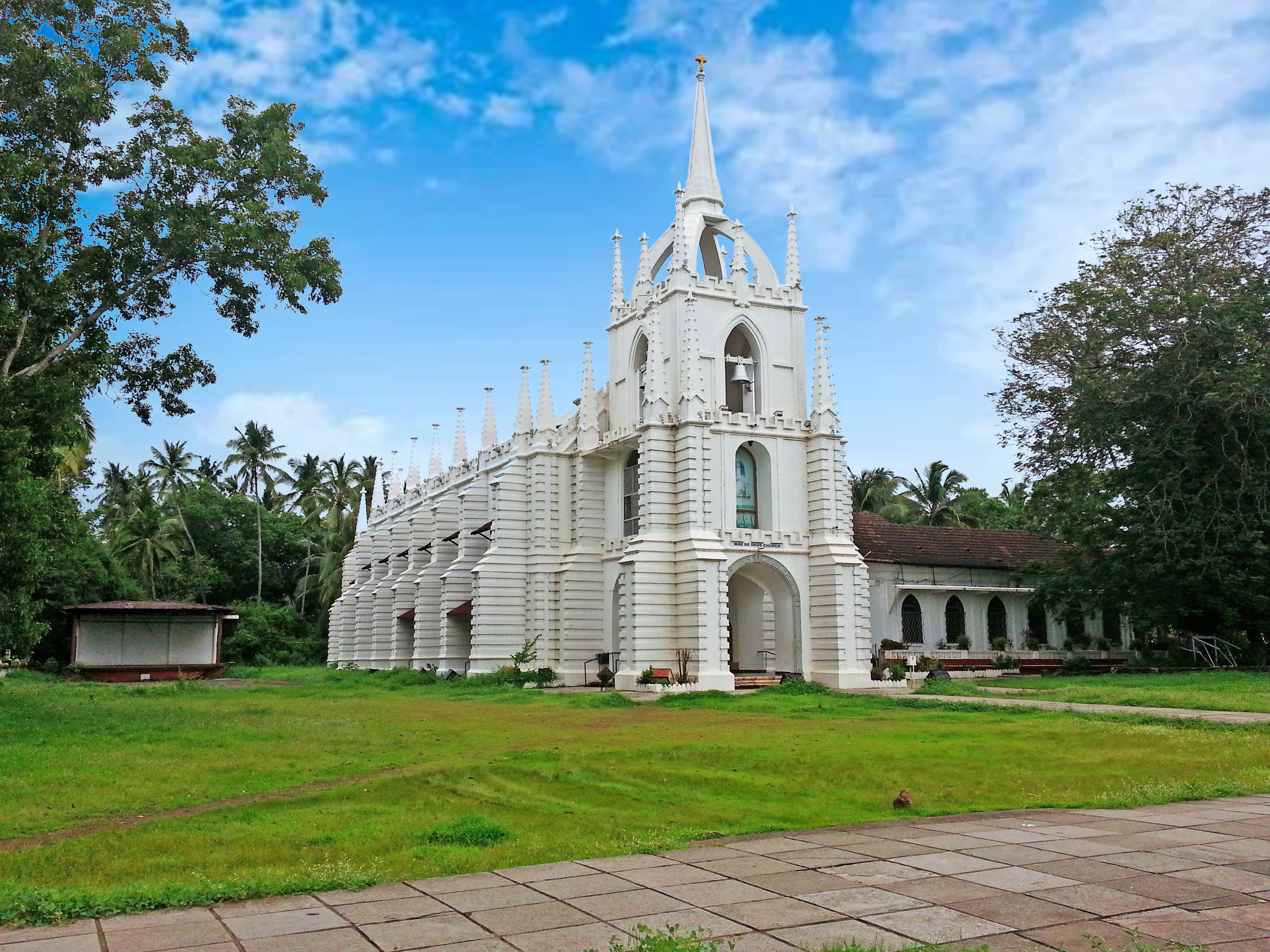
Saligao church view.
Images from Saligao, Goa, India
