= Pilerne =

Pilerne Pilerna
- village
- Location in Goa, India Pilerne (India)
- Coordinates: 15°32′N 73°49′E
- Country: India
- State: Goa
- District: North Goa

Languages
  - Official: Konkani
- Time zone: UTC+5:30 (IST)
- Vehicle registration: GA
- Website: goa.gov.in

Pilerne is a village situated in north Goa in the Bardez taluka of the North Goa district. It is rustic despite being fairly close to the North Goa tourist belt, and is considered a Census Town for the purposes of the Census. The village has mainly been inhabited by Goan Catholics.

== Area and population ==
For the purposes of the Census, Pilerne is considered to be a Census Town. Its location area code is 626700. Pilerne (has an area of 6.54 sq.km. and a total population of 1,482 households. Its population is 5,827: 3,024 males and 2,803 females. Pilerne's under-six population is made up of 577 children: 289 boys and 288 girls.

== Setting ==
Pilerne lies between green paddy fields and hillocks of the sub-district of Bardez. The village has a thick cover of teak and Sal trees native to the Western Ghats and is known for its proliferation of bird life. Some of the birds noticed here include the Asian Paradise Flycatchers, Oriental Magpie Robins, Tickell's Blue Flycatchers, Golden Orioles are found in abundance in the trees along with the exotic Hornbill, and the odd peacock. River otters were also reported as having been sighted at the Saulem lake.

== Landmarks ==
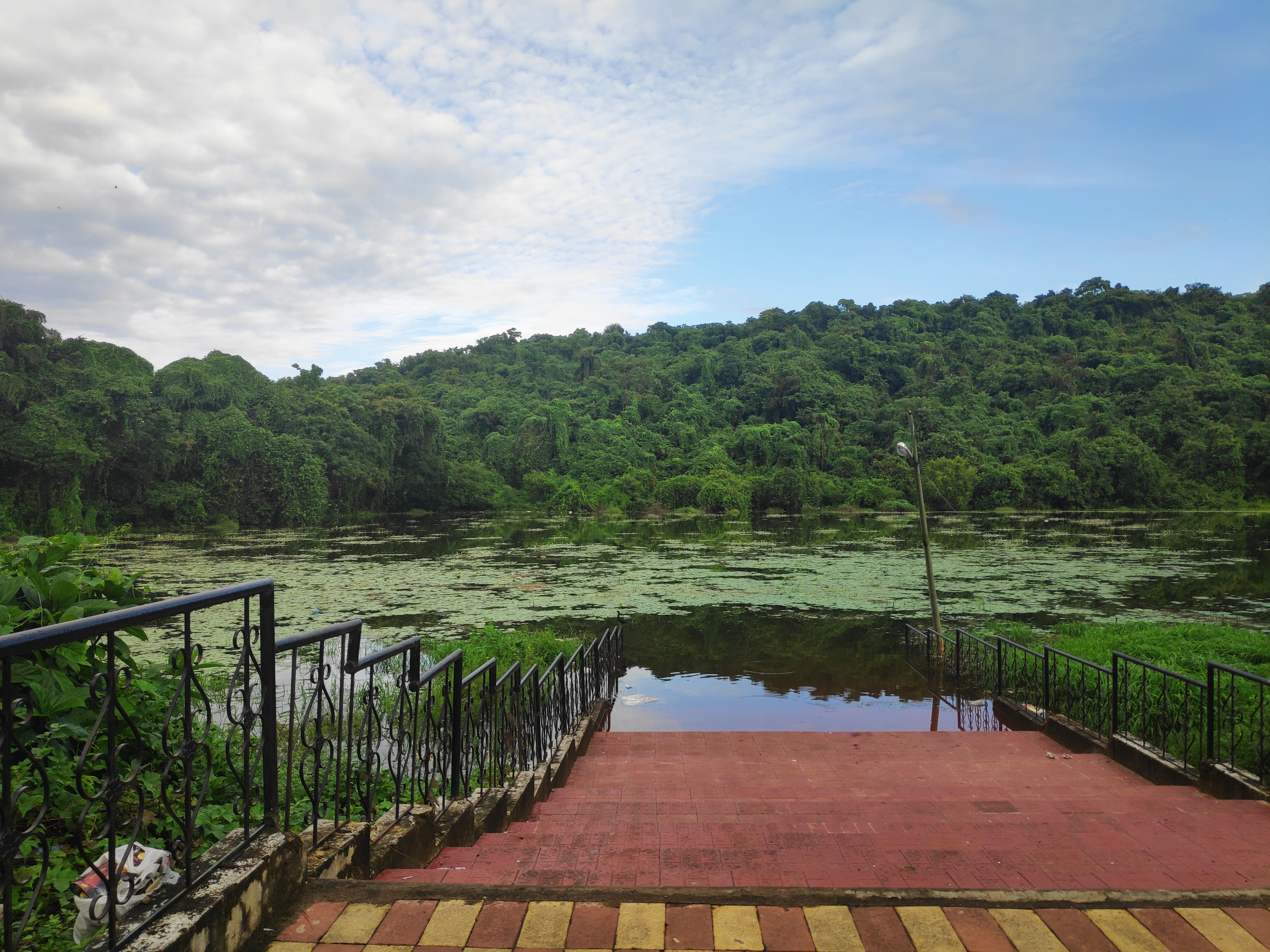
Savlem, or Saulem, lake. Pilerne.

On the village hilltop is the Pilerne Industrial Estate which was set up in 1994 with an area of 4,89,225 sq m.

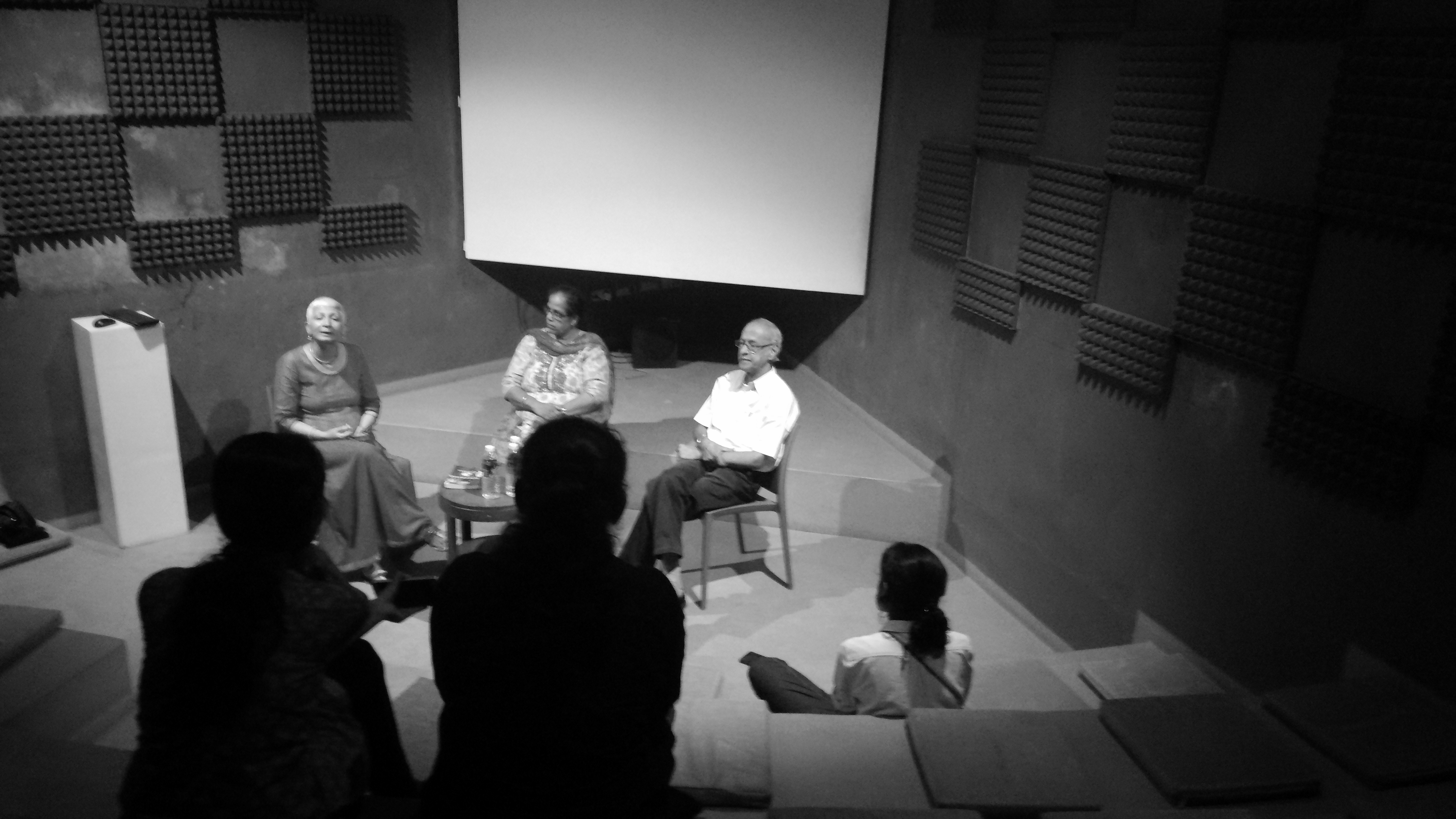
Museum of Goa, at Pilerne.

Subodh Kerkar's Museum of Goa is located here.

- The village church is dedicated to John the Baptist and was built in 1658.
- The Pilerne Lake is home to a number of migratory water birds and has been developed, preventing the dumping of building debris which was unchecked for a while.
- Alongside the Pilerne Industrial Estate is the Seminary of Our Lady, which straddles the villages of Pilerne and Saligao, built in the 1950s, and a minor seminary for all the Catholic boys studying for priesthood since.
- Some small but tasty eateries have also come up in the village.

== Poets, books ==
The poet Joseph Furtado, one of the early writers to pen verse in the English language from South Asia, traced his roots to the village, as did his son Philip Furtado.

Augusto Pinto, reviewer and critic, comments:

The house where he spent his childhood, in the north Goan town of Pilerne, is today in ruins. Only a handful of the oldest residents remember him, and hardly anyone knows that Furtado, who passed away in 1947 at the age of 75, was one of the finest Indian English poets of his time. Fortunately, many of his poems still survive – barely – in just one slim volume in the rare-books section of Goa’s Central Library.

Marianne Furtado de Nazareth, the journalist-author, has written a book called Above The Rice Fields of Pilerne: A Tapestry of Life (2005).

== Environmental issues ==
In December 2018, Pilerne was declared the cleanest panchayat in the State of Goa.

In November 2020, the Government of Goa's Goa State Wetlands Authority had issued a draft notification to declare Pilerne's Saulem lake, along with three others, as wetlands. Earlier, in 2013, the Savlem (also spelt as Saulem) lake was reported to be facing the perils of "pollution and apathy" with a huge housing colony almost built on the spot had it not been for some alert villagers.

In December 2020, parishioners, village panchayat of Pilerne and Pilerne Citizen Forum organised a rally on the theme of "Towards a sustainable development of Pilerne", stressing the "threat" to their village which needed protection from the "builder lobby".

As of August 2016, the National Green Tribunal asked the Government of Goa's Forest Department to map an area of 28,550 square metres, identified as private forest in Pilerne, following a complaint filed by a local citizen's group, the Pilerne Citizens Forum.

A garbage plant on the hillock adjacent to the village has caused concern in the area. In July 2020, it was reported that the "expansion of the Saligao garbage treatment plant has come under a major cloud, not with just the local villagers strongly objecting to this, but politics also being played out on the issue." Goa's State government approved an expansion of the plant from 150 tonnes per day to 250 TPD, at an approved project cost of Rs 103.87 crore.

== Local concerns ==
In February 2020, the villagers' council (gram sabha) opposed plans to declare Pilerne an urban area. They feared that multi-storeyed buildings would come up in the village, threatening its "beauty and heritage".

Illegal cutting of hills has been reported in Marra, Pilerne, around 2019 and at other times.

== Changes in the village ==
Many houses in parts of the village are uninhabited and some have fallen into ruin, mainly due to out-migration from the village. Due to the real-estate boom, houses in the village have been sold and some of these renovated. Villagers have raised the issue of the sale of communidade (village common) lands.
