= Socorro, Goa =

Socorro Serula
- Village
- Location in Goa, India Socorro (India)
- Coordinates: 15.5333°N 73.8333°E
- Country: India
- State: Goa
- District: North Goa

Population (2001)
  - Total: 10,171

Languages
  - Official: Konkani
- Time zone: UTC+5:30 (IST)
- Vehicle registration: GA
- Website: goa.gov.in

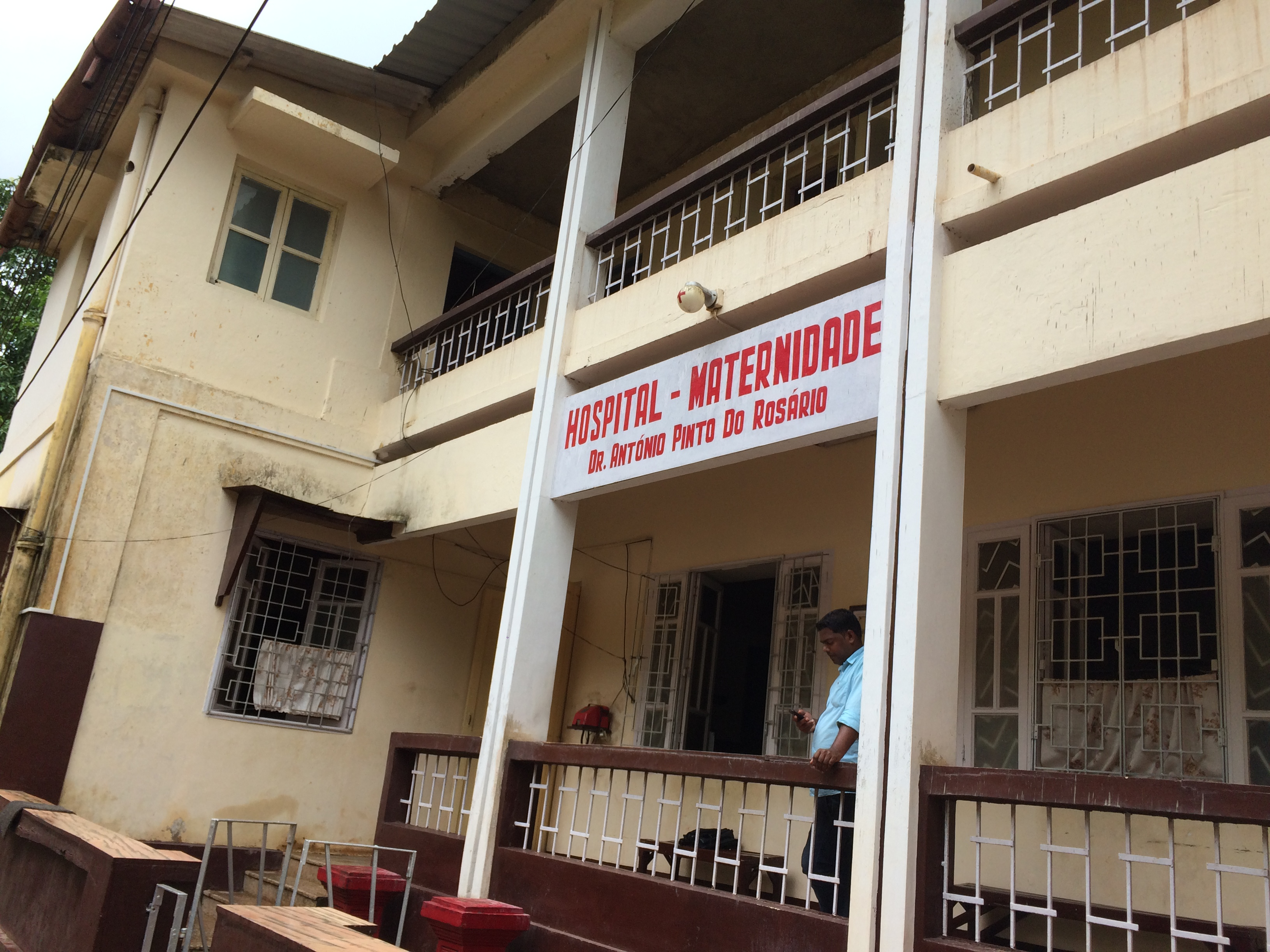
Founded in 1938, the Dr Antonio Pinto do Rosario Maternity Hospital in Porvorim is one of Goa's oldest hospitals

Socorro is a village that lies five kilometres to the east of Mapusa town in Bardez taluka. It is administered by a panchayat represented by members from the seven wards of Ambirna, Arrarim, Carrem, Maina, Porvorim, Vaddem and Zosvaddo. It is also considered as a census town in North Goa district in the Indian state of Goa. It once formed part of the comunidade and the larger village of Serula. Serula has since been divided into the villages of Salvador do Mundo, Penha da Franca (Britona), Pomburpa and Socorro. The village takes its name from the patron saint or deity of its parish church, our Lady of Succour or Nossa Senhora do Socorro.

== Demographics ==
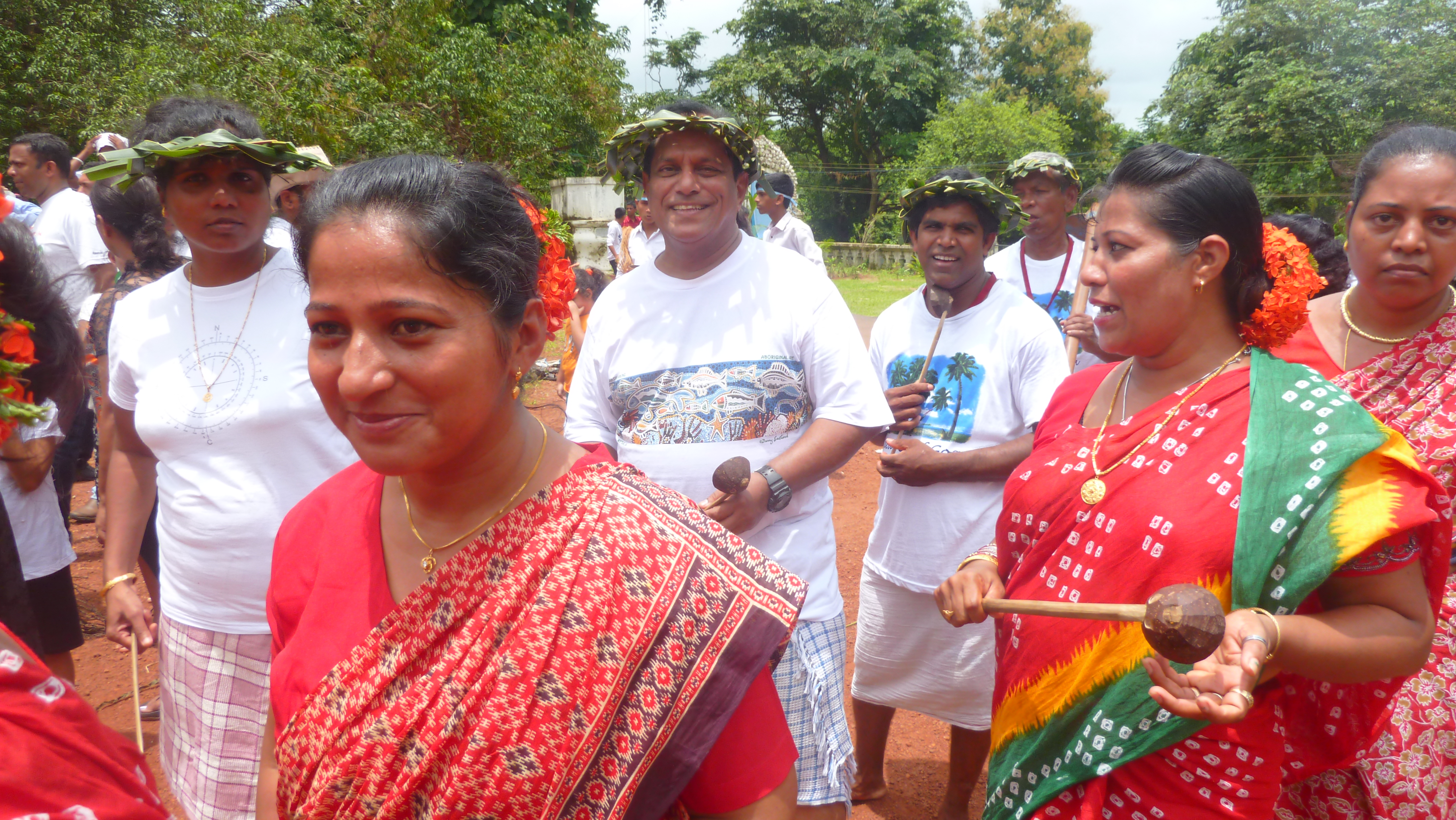
Villagers celebrate at the Socorro church.

As of 2001 India census, Socorro had a population of 10,171. Males constitute 51% of the population and females 49%. Socorro (Serula) has an average literacy rate of 78%, higher than the national average of 59.5%: male literacy is 81%, and female literacy is 74%. In Socorro (Serula), 11% of the population is under 6 years of age.

== Church of Nossa Senhora do Socorro ==
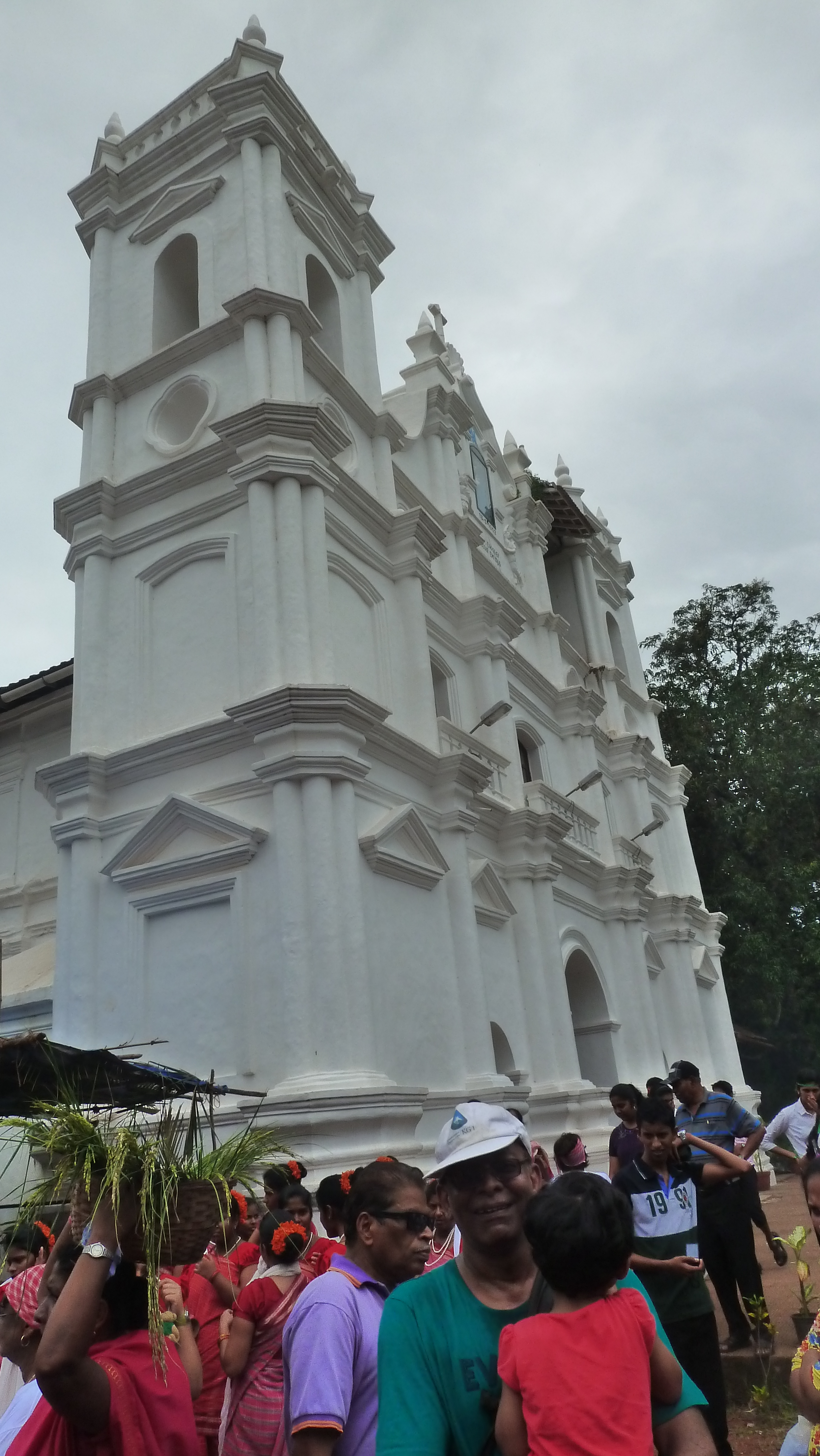
Socorro church.

"Built in 1667, this was the third parish church to be erected within the confines of the original parish of Serula. It was rebuilt in 1763. The throne and the pulpit of this church came from the Oratorian Convent of Cruz dos Milagres at Old Goa."

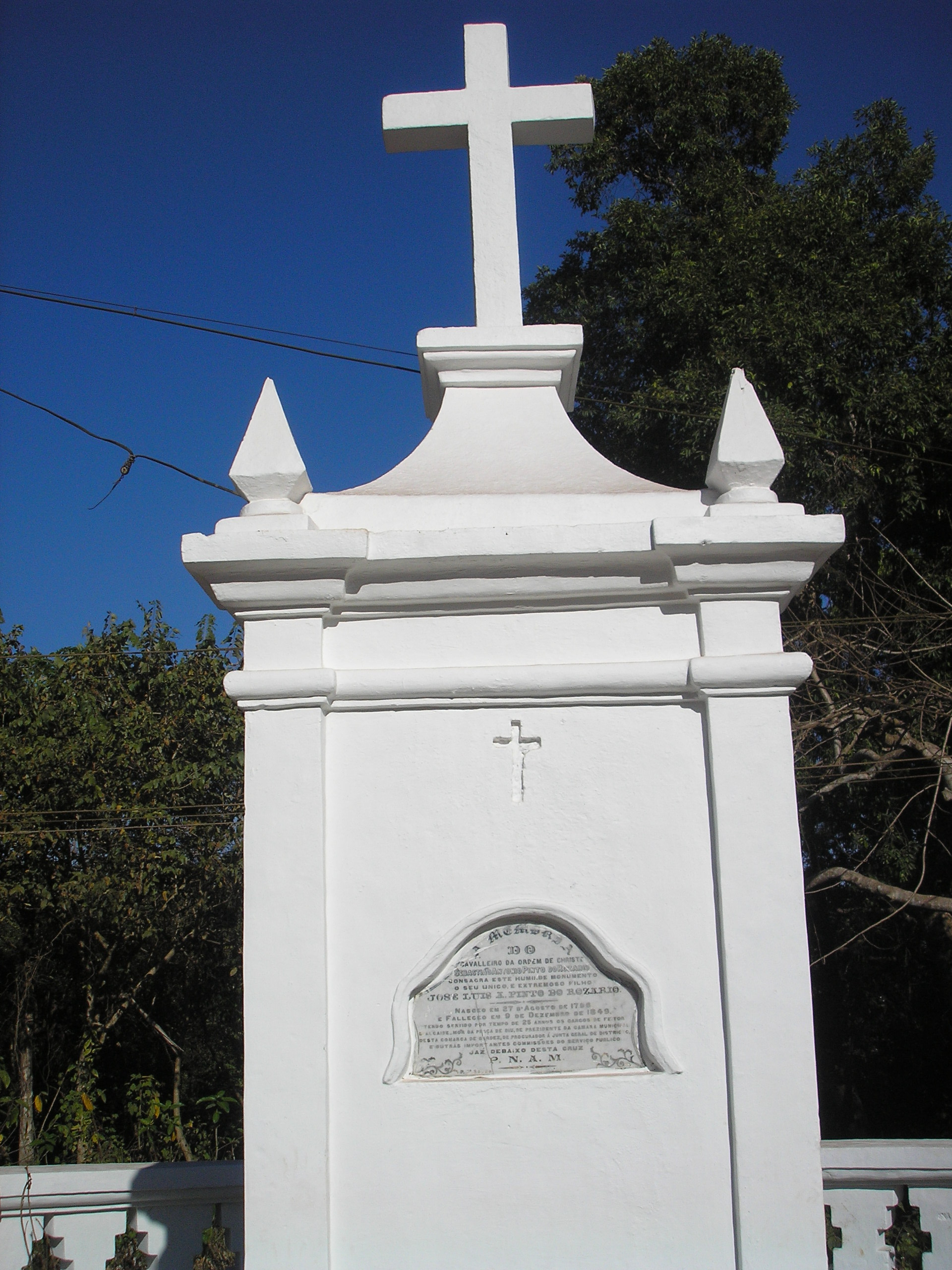
Cross on Church complex built in the memory of Sebastiao Antonio Pinto do Rozario, eminent Porvorim resident and official

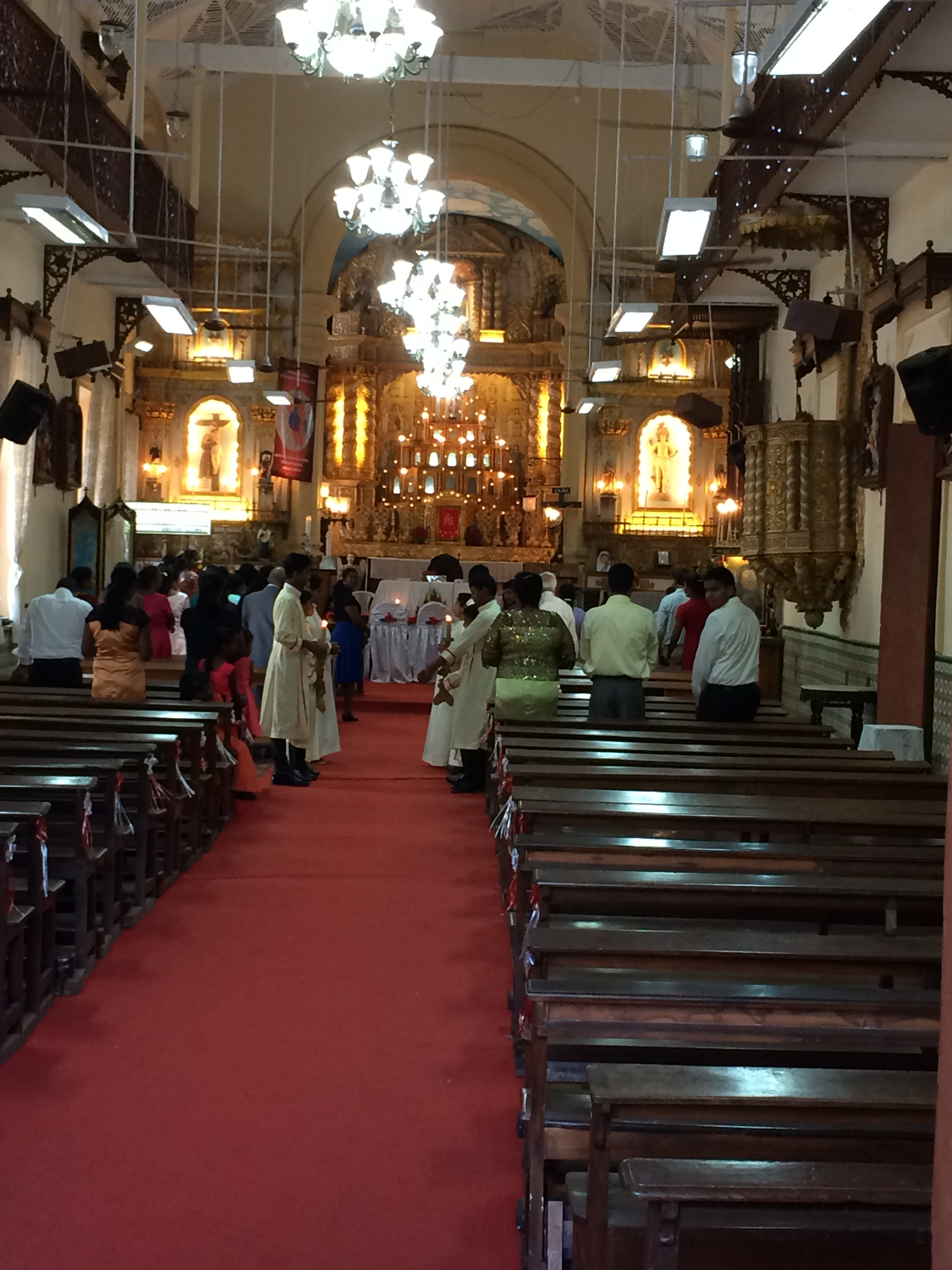
The church interior, showing the main and side altars and the pulpit that came from the Oratorian Convent of Cruz dos Milagros at Old Goa.Socorro, Goa

Given that Bardez was evangelized by the Franciscans, and that the church has a cloister, it is likely that it used to be served by the Franciscans.

The annual feast of Our Lady of Succour is celebrated on November 21.

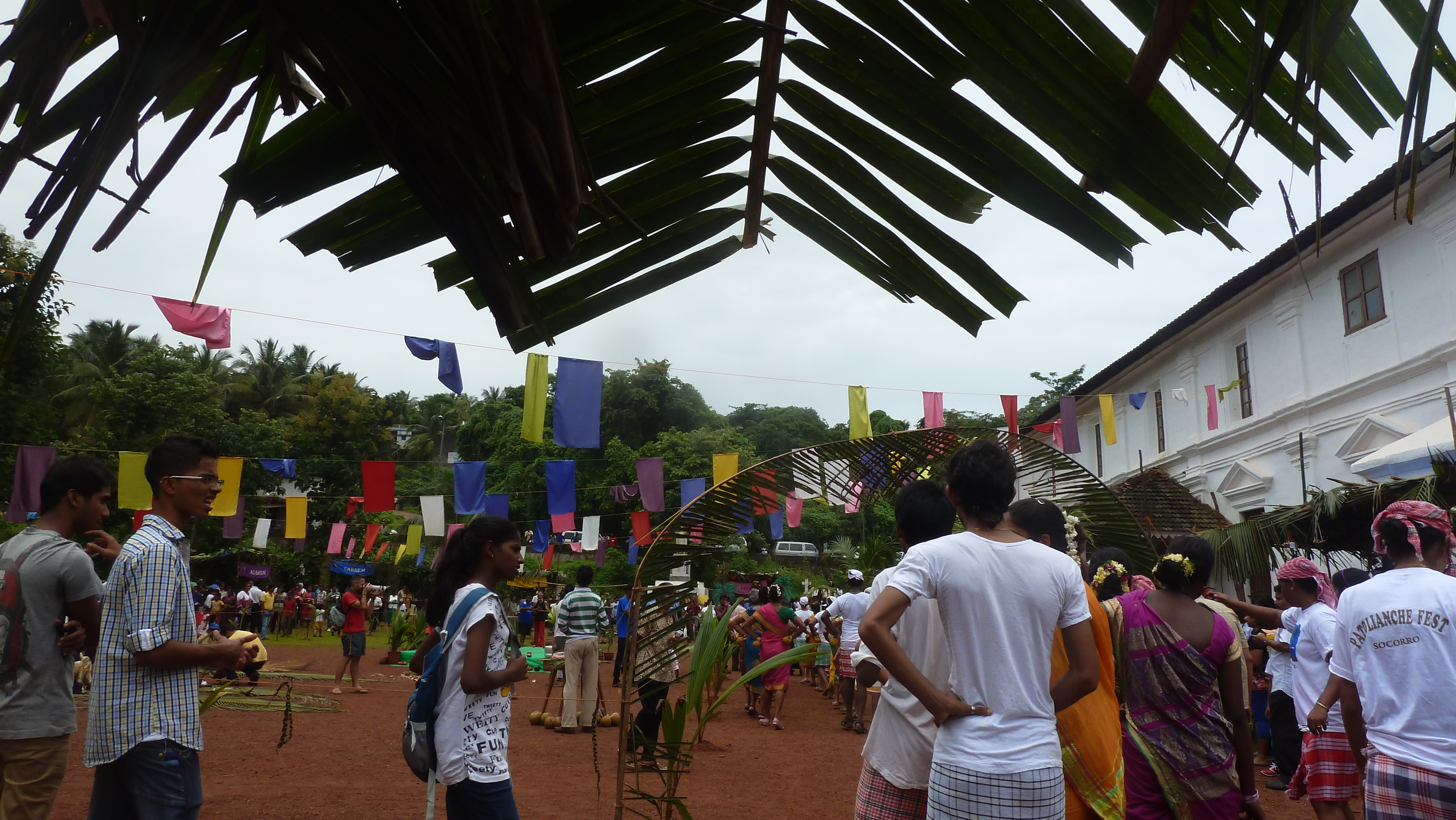
Villagers' event at the Socorro church

The parish has one chapel with a resident chaplain (Our Lady of Candelaria, Porvorim), and two chapels without chaplains (Our Lady of Remedios, Vaddem and Our Lady of Rosary, Carrem). The church bodies are the Parish Pastoral Council and the Fabrica de Igreja de Socorro. The religious communities are the Sisters of the Cross of Chavanod (SCC) at Carrem, and the Medical Mission Sisters (MMS). The associations and movements are the Confraria of Our Lady of Socorro, the Confraria of Our Lady of Candelaria, the Confraria of Our Lady of Remedios, the Confraria of Our Lady of Rosary, Carrem; the Legion of Mary; the Society of St Vincent de Paul; and the Charismatic Renewal. The village has two educational institutions, one is the Our Lady of Succour Primary School run by the Diocesan Society of Education (DSE) and the other is Holy Family High School, Porvorim.

== Recent changes ==
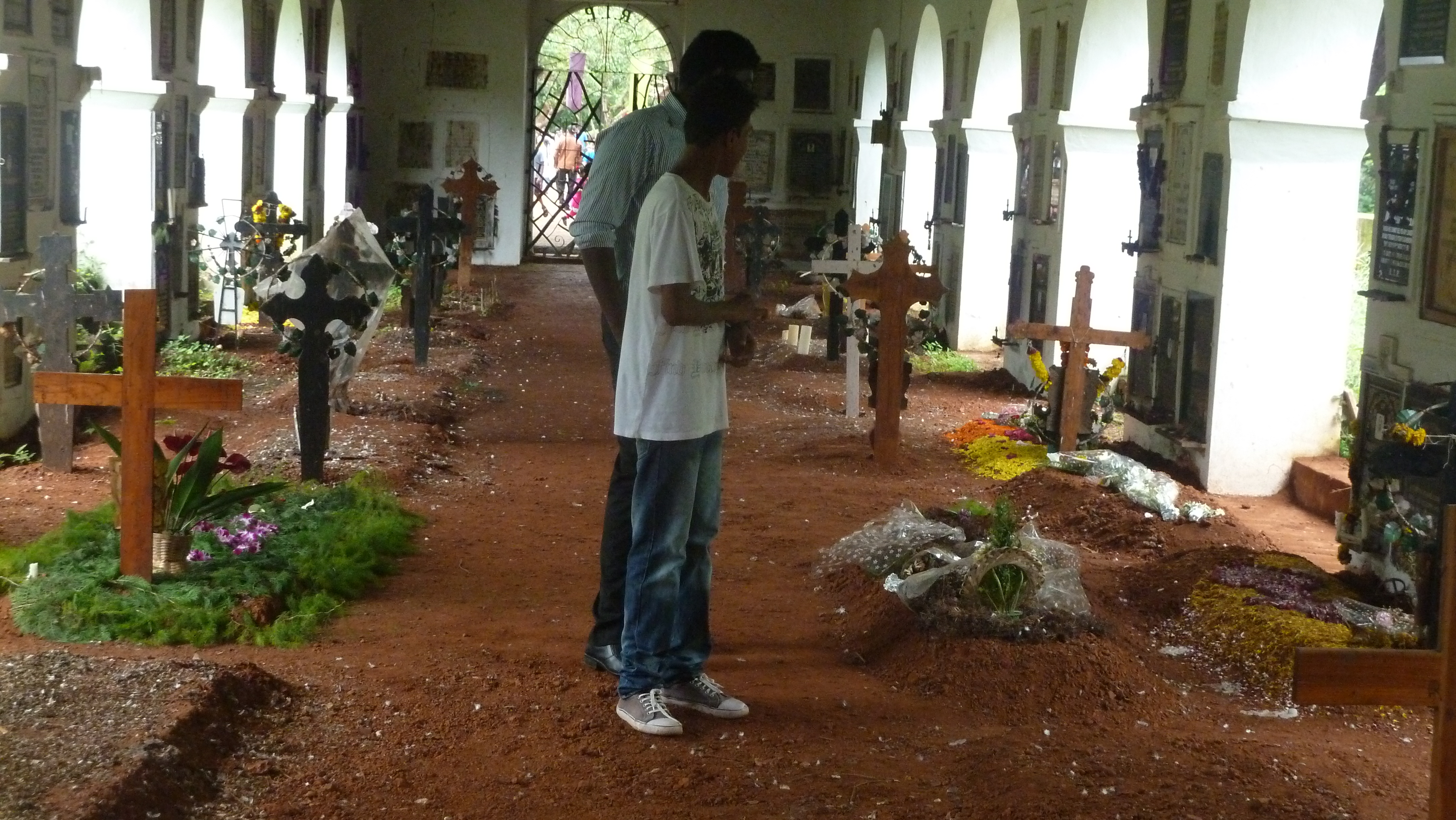
Interior of cemetery of Our Lady of Succour Church.

The recent urbanisation in Goa has led to many settlers in the area, and some prominent homes being built here.

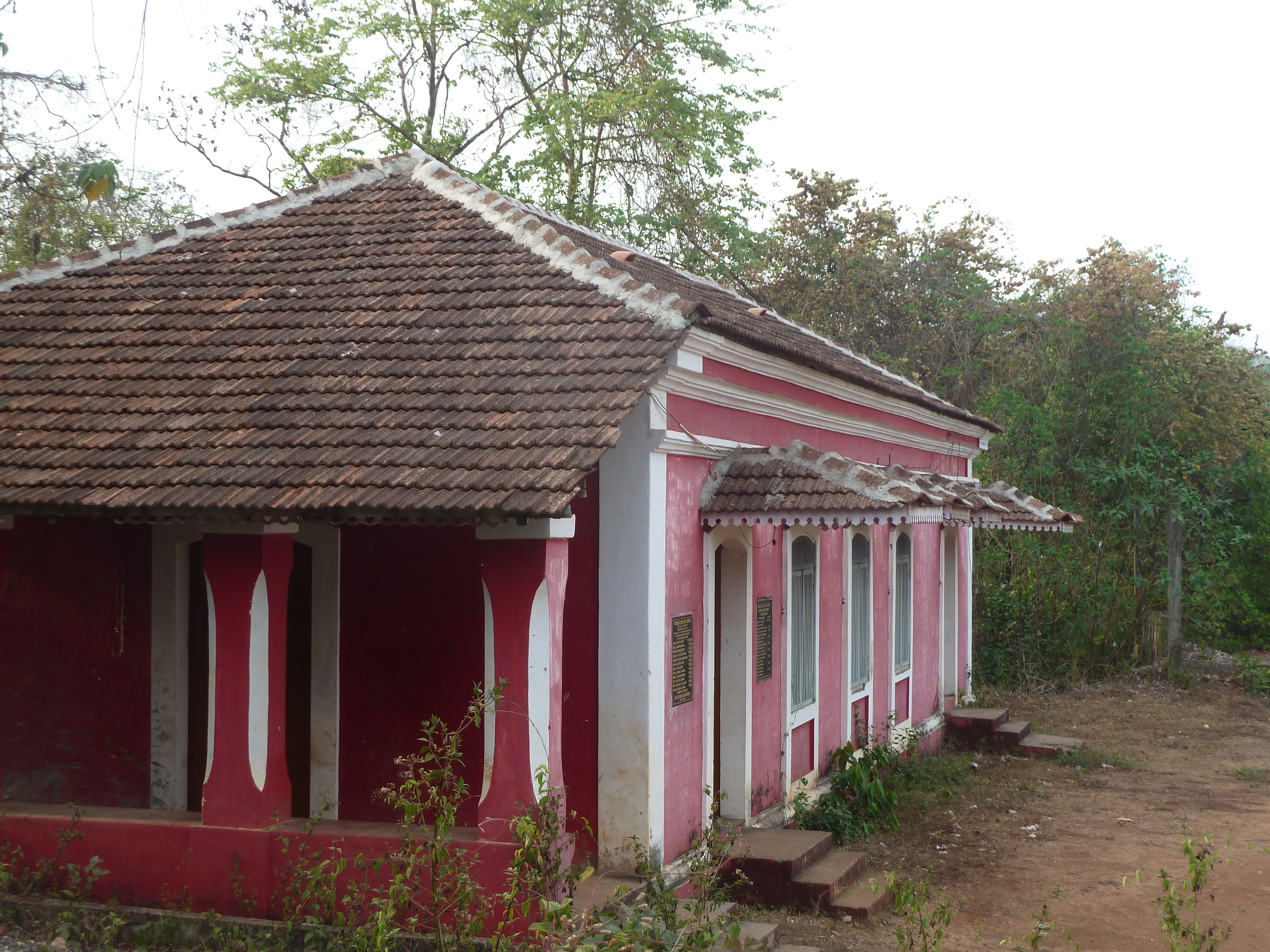
The building which housed the erstwhile parochial school in the Portuguese era and Our Lady of Succour Middle School in the 1960s and 1970s. In the 1980s, the Socorro branch of Corporation Bank was located here.

Some land scams have also been reported in the area, as in the July 2020 Enforcement Directorate attachment of land in Socorro worth Rs 3.19 crore (Rs 30.10 million), in a case reported to involve local functionaries too as coming "under the scanner of the ED sleuths."
