= List of parishes of the Roman Catholic Archdiocese of Goa and Daman =

The Roman Catholic Archdiocese of Goa and Daman comprises nineteen Deaneries consisting of 162 member parishes spread across the state of Goa.

== Aldona Deanery ==
- Aldona - St Thomas, the Apostle
- Calvim - St Sebastian
- Moira - Immaculate Conception
- Nachinola - Bom Jesus
- Olaulim - St Anne
- Penha de Franca - Our Lady of Penha de Franca
- Pomburpa - Mother of God
- Salvador do Mundo - Saviour of the World

== Bicholim Deanery ==
- Assonora - St Clara
- Bicholim - Our Lady of Grace
- Bodiem - St Anne
- Sanquelim - St John of the Cross
- Sirsaim - Our Lady of the Miracles
- Tivim - St Christopher
- Valpoi - Our Lady of Lourdes

== Calangute Deanery ==
- Calangute - St Alex
- Candolim - Our Lady of Hope
- Nagoa - Holy Trinity
- Nerul - Our Lady of Remedios
- Pilerne - St John Baptist
- Reis Magos - Holy Magi
- Saligao - Our Lady the Mother of God
- Sinquerim - St Lawrence

== Mapusa Deanery ==
- Bastora - St Cajetan
- Colvale - St Francis of Assisi
- Cunchelim - Our Lady of Flight
- Duler - St Francis Xavier
- Guirim - St Diogo
- Mapusa - St Jerome
- Porvorim - Holy Family
- Parra - St Anne
- Pirna - St Francis Xavier
- Revora - Our Lady of Victory
- Socorro - Our Lady of Succour
- Ucassaim - St Elizabeth

== Pernem Deanery ==
- Arambol - Our Lady of Mount Carmel
- Maina (Corgao) - St Francis Xavier
- Mandrem - Our Lady of Rosary
- Morjim - Our Lady of Miracles
- Pernem - St Joseph
- Querim - St Francis Xavier
- Tiracol - St Anthony
- Tormas - St Sebastian
- Tuem - St Francis Xavier
- Vaidongor - Our Lady of Rosary

== Siolim Deanery ==
- Anjuna - St Michael
- Assagao - St Cajetan
- Badem - Our Lady of Miracles
- Camurlim - St Rita of Cassia
- Oxel - Our Lady of the Sea
- Siolim - St Anthony
- Tropa - Our Lady of Consolation of the Persecuted
- Vagator - St Anthony

== Goa Velha Deanery ==
- Agaçaim - St Lawrence
- Azossim - St Matthew
- Batim - Our Lady of Guadalupe
- Curca - Our Lady of Rosary
- Goa Velha - St Andrew
- Mandur - Our Lady of Amparo
- Neura - St John Evangelist
- Siridao - Our Lady of Rosary
- Talaulim - St Anne

== Old Goa Deanery ==
- Carambolim - St John Baptist
- Corlim - St John Facundo
- Marcel - Holy Family
- Naroa - Holy Spirit
- Old Goa - St Catherine
- Piedade - Our Lady of Piety
- São Brãs - St Blaise
- Santo Estêvão - St Stephen
- São Matias - St Mathias
- São Pedro - St Peter
- Vanxim - Christ

== Panjim Deanery ==
- Bambolim - Our Lady of Bethlehem
- Chorão - Our Lady of Grace
- Merces - Our Lady of Merces
- Panjim - Immaculate Conception
- Ribandar - Our Lady of Help
- Chorão - St Bartholomew
- Santa Cruz - Holy Cross
- Sant Inez - St Agnes
- Taleigao - St Michael
- Caranzalem - Our Lady of Rosary

== Ponda Deanery ==
- Borim - St Francis Xavier
- Mardol - Our Lady of Piety
- Panchwadi - St Anthony
- Ponda - St Anne
- Shiroda - St Joseph
- Usgao - St Joseph

== Benaulim Deanery ==
- Benaulim - St John the Baptist
- Benaulim - Holy Trinity
- Betalbatim - Our Lady of Remedios
- Carmona - Our Lady of Succour
- Cavelossim - Holy Cross
- Colva - Our Lady of Mercês
- Orlim - St Michael
- Seraulim - Our Lady of the Pilar
- Varca - Our Lady of Gloria

== Canacona Deanery ==
- Agonda - St Anne
- Anjediva - Church of Our Lady of Springs
- Batpale - St Francis Xavier
- Canacona - St Theresa of Jesus
- Chiplem - Our Lady Help of Christians
- Galgibaga - St Anthony
- Loliem - St Sebastian
- Sadolxem - Our Lady of Rosary

== Chinchinim Deanery ==
- Assolna - Our Lady Queen of Martyrs
- Betul - Immaculate Conception
- Cabo de Rama - St Anthony
- Canaguinim - St Sebastian
- Cotto de Fatorpa - Our Lady of Fatima
- Cuncolim - Our Lady of Health
- Dramapur - St Joseph
- Sarzora - Our Lady of the Assumption
- Tollecanto - St Rock
- Velim - St Francis Xavier
- Veroda - St Anthony
- Chinchinim - Our Lady of Hope

== Quepem Deanery ==
- Ambaulim - Our Lady of Lourdes
- Chandor - Our Lady of Bethlehem
- Macasana - St Francis Xavier
- Paroda - Immaculate Conception
- Quepem - Holy Cross
- Sao Jose de Areal - St Joseph
- Tilamola - Our Lady Mother of the Poor

== Sanguem Deanery ==
- Collem - Our Lady of Piety
- Dabal - Immaculate Conception
- Rivona - Our Lady of Rosary
- Sanguem - Our Lady of Miracles
- Sanvordem - Guardian Angel
- Vaddem - Sacred Heart of Jesus

== Margao Deanery ==
- Aquem - St Sebastian
- Dicarpale - Our Lady of Fatima
- Fatorda - Our Lady of Rosary
- Margao - Holy Spirit Church, Margao
- Margao - Our Lady of Grace
- Navelim - Our Lady of Rosary
- Davorlim - Our Lady of Rosary

== Mormugao Deanery ==
- Baina - Our Lady of Candelaria
- Bogmalo - Sts Cosmas and Damian
- Chicalim - St Francis Xavier
- Cortalim - Sts Phillip and James
- Desterro - Our Lady of Desterro
- Mormugao - St Francis Xavier
- Sancoale - Our Lady of Health
- São Jacinto - St Hyacinth
- Vasco da Gama - St Andrew

== Verna Deanery ==
- Cansaulim - St Thomas
- Consua - Our Lady of Livra Febres
- Majorda - Mother of God
- Nagoa - Our Lady of Good Success
- Nuvem - Mother of the Poor
- Quelossim - Our Lady of the Sick
- Utorda - Our Lady of Lourdes
- Velsao - Our Lady of Assumption
- Verna - Holy Cross

== Raia Deanery ==
- Arlem - Our Lady of Livramento
- Camurlim - Our Lady of Candelaria
- Curtorim - St Alex
- Loutolim - Saviour of the World
- Maina - St Rita of Cassia
- Rachol - Our Lady of Snows
- Raia - Our Lady of Snows
