= Ucassaim =

Ucassaim Uskoi
- Village
- Location of Ucassaim in Goa Ucassaim (India)
- Coordinates: 15°34′49″N 73°50′30″E
- Country: India
- State: Goa
- District: North Goa
- Sub-district: Bardez
- Elevation: 15 m (49 ft)
- Time zone: UTC+5:30 (IST)
- Postcode: 403507
- Area code: 0832
- Nearest city: Mapusa

Ucassaim is a village in Bardez, in the west coastal region of Goa. It is located close to Mapusa town and is known as the home for some prominent persons from the area. Ucassaim was once is known as Mistirincho Ganv, (Musicians' Village) because of the number of musicians (mistri) who flourished in this village.

== Geography and life ==
Ucassaim is located at 15°34′49″N 73°50′30″E at an elevation of 15 m above MSL, just a few kilometers away from Mapusa City. It is surrounded by the villages of Bastora, Sucorro-Vaddem, Nachinola and Moira.

The village is surrounded by green hills and flowing riverlets. The temperature hovers from around 25 °C in winter to 38 °C in summer.

== Area, population ==
As per the official Census of 2011, Ucassaim has an area of 263.65 hectares, and a population of 278 households, comprising a total population of 1,077 which includes 509 males and 568 females, while the under-six population of children is a total of 74 made up of 27 boys and 47 girls. Ucassaim carries location code number under the Census of 2011.

== Wards ==
The village is divided into eight wards, as subdivisions of the village are locally known: Punola, Paliem, Paliem-Nogeira, Dumpem-Pajir, Igorz Vaddo, St. Anthony, Bela Flor and Pello Vaddo. The village community includes Catholics, Hindus and Muslims.

== Prehistoric cave ==
On the hill behind the village lies a cave popularly referred to as Vagbuyer. It is believed that this is a prehistoric cave in the laterite rock. It is also believed that there used to be a tunnel connecting the cave to the neighbouring Pomburpa Church. The cave contains a small waterfall active in the monsoon, which in turn connects to the rivulet (vanv in Konkani) gushing through the village in the monsoon and connecting to the main river. From the cross on the hill one obtains a beautiful view of the village.

== St Elizabeth Church ==
The construction of the original church building commenced around 1618 and was completed in 1628. The Comunidades of Ucassaim, Bastora, as well as Punola and Paliem, as well as many private individuals, funded the construction. The new church was dedicated to St. Elizabeth, Queen of Portugal.

At the beginning of the 18th Century, a cyclone destroyed the church. It was rebuilt in 1708 on an enlarged scale. To reduce the cost, Fr. Francisco de São Boaventura, the then Parish Priest, himself used to carry timber on his back. Seeing his example, the whole parish joined in building the church and helped in reducing the cost.

The church faces north. On approaching the church plot from the main road one can first see the statue of Christ the King, and then walk along an avenue flanked by rice fields on both sides until reaching the main church building. This place was asphalted in 1995.

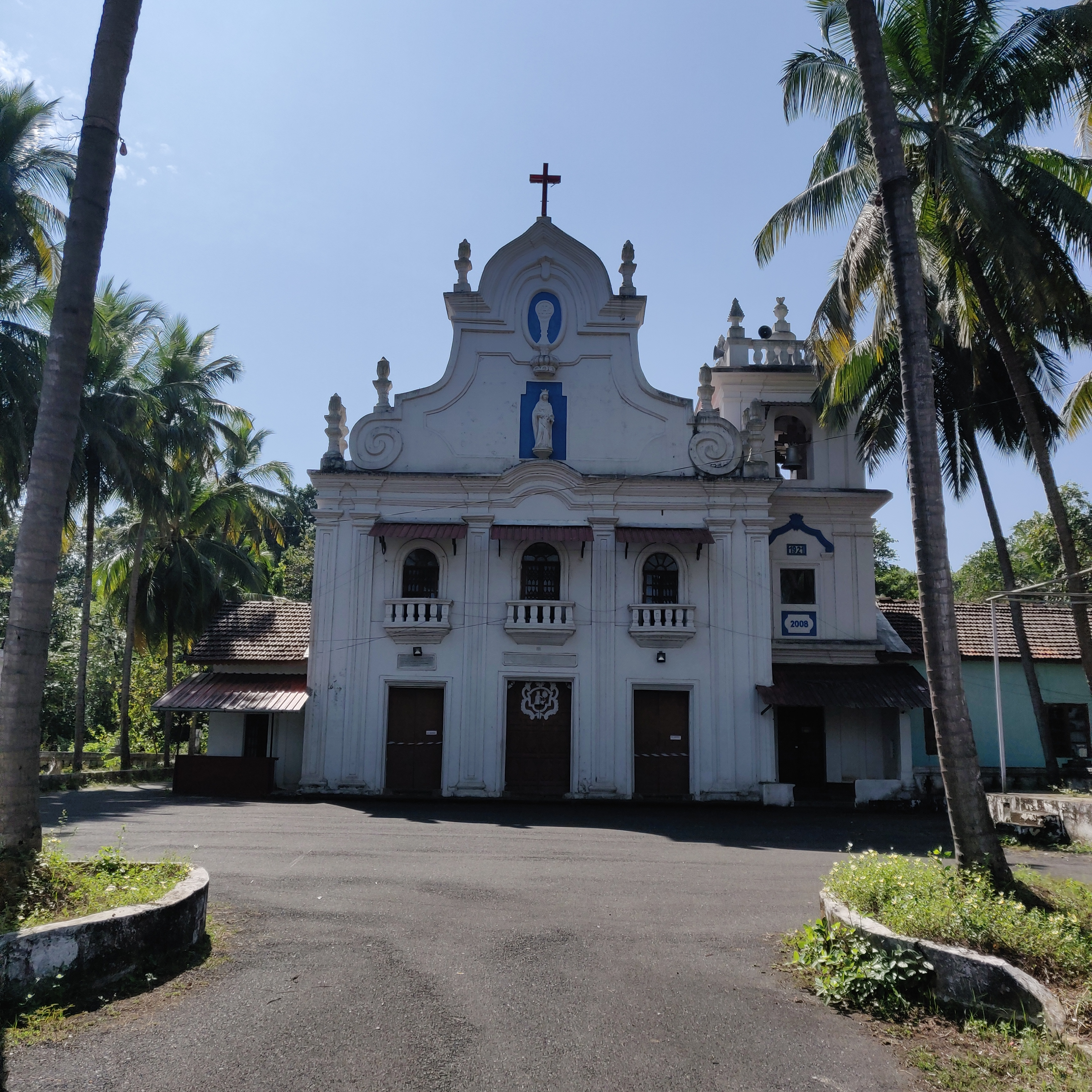

As you enter the church, you can see the main altar at the center and two smaller altars on both sides. On the right side wall, you can find the Pulpit which was once upon a time used for preaching.

The statue of the patron saint St. Elizabeth dominates the main altar. Her feast is celebrated on 4 July every year and since it is in the monsoon season, there is a local saying "Sant Izabel Ranni; Dimbhi Bhor Panni" which means "when we have St. Elizabeth the Queen we shall have knee-deep water", which refers to the abundance of water required to cultivate the rice crop. Below, to the right, there are smaller statues of St. Luis Gonzaga and of Our Lady. The main altar also houses the Tabernacle where the Blessed Sacrament is preserved.

On the side altars: the right side altar bears the statue of the Crucified Jesus, below which are smaller statues of St. Anne and St. Anthony. The left side altar bears the statue of Our Lady of Health, whose feast is very popular, and below which are smaller statues of St. Joseph and St. Sebastian.

Some major repairs were done internally in 1996 and in 2008 wherein the platform for the sanctuary and the face-lifting exercise was done under the leadership and guidance of Fr. Almir de Souza, the then parish priest. Fr. Almir also brought about a radical change in the outlook of the parishioners installing in the parish many new norms as per the Vatican II council conclusions. The church has a well developed cemetery which was repaired and renovated around the year 2000 during the tenure of Fr. Mousinho de Ataide.

The church residence now has 2 halls: a larger one used for gatherings and the smaller one which houses the office of the church. Besides these, there are rooms for the Parish Priest and for guest priests and Assistants. The residence is built around an open-air courtyard with a garden built as old as the 18th century and still maintained by the church.

== Temple ==
A new temple was built and inaugurated in December 2010.

== Festivals and celebrations ==
Ucassaim celebrates a variety of festivals locally. A local festival called "GITVANA", used to be held annually which provided a platform for the young and the old to perform on stage singing the traditional mandós or acting in one-act skits. The children of the village won first prize in the All Goa Tiatr Competition in the year 2011 and were runners-up in 2012. Natka is another form of theatre in its traditional form held annually; this also provides a great platform for performance. Local traditions including celebrating the San joao festival in June, St Elizabeth church feast in July. The Monsoon splash, water games for the youth is another trendy event that has been running for many years.

== Occupation and lifestyle ==
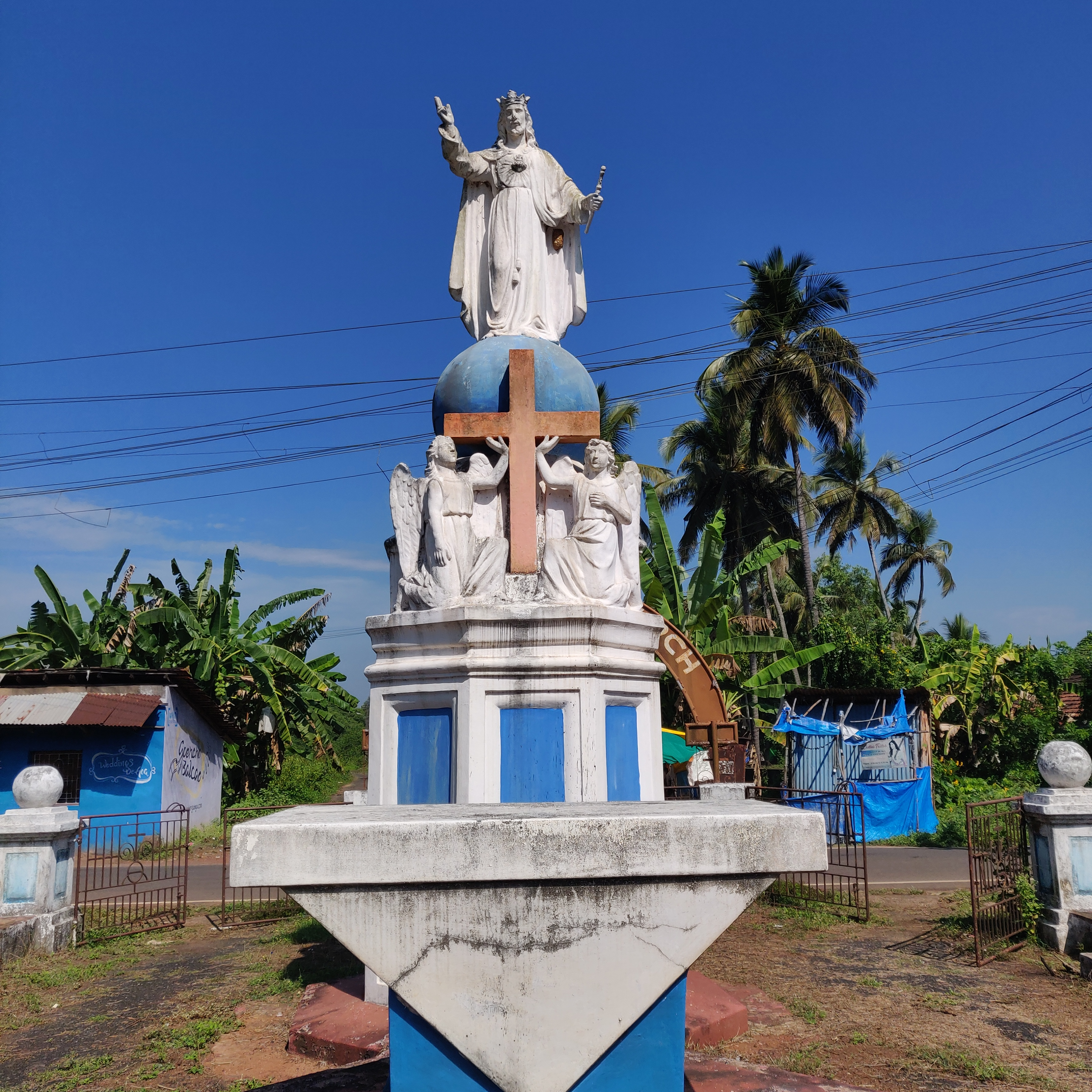

Occupations in Ucassaim range from agricultural farming to garden florists. Many villagers have emigrated to Arab countries in the Persian Gulf, Europe, the United States, Canada and Australia.

== Notable people ==
- Prof. Mariano Saldanha (1878–1975), professor of Marathi, Sanskrit and Konkani in Goa and Portugal.
- Dr. Ernest Borges, a noted cancer surgeon.
