= Assonora =

Village in Goa Bardez, India

- Village
- Location within Goa Location within India
- Coordinates: 15°37′15″N 73°53′52″E
- Country: India
- State: Goa
- District: North Goa
- Sub-district: Bardez

Government
  - Type: Panchayat

Population
  - Total: 5,870

Languages
  - Official: Konkani
- Time zone: UTC+5:30 (IST)
- Postcode: 403503
- Telephone Code: 0832

Assonora is a village located in the Bardez taluka of Goa, India. It is located in North Goa, 12 km (7.5 mi) away from Mapusa and 24 km (15 mi) away from Panaji. The church of Assonora is St Clara's.

== Education institution ==
The Educational Institution at Assonora, Goa St. Clare's High School, run by The Poor Sisters of Our Lady (PSOL), based at Infant Jesus of Prague Convent, Auchit Waddo, Assonora, Goa.

== See also ==
- St Clara's Church (Assonora)
