= St Clara's Church (Assonora) =

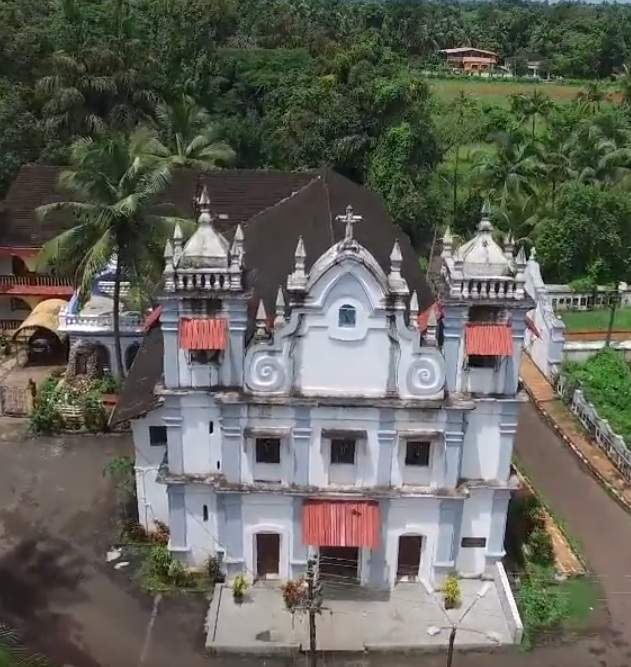
- St Clara's Church
- St Clara's Church
- Location: Assonora, Goa
- Country: India
- Denomination: Roman Catholic

History
- Status: Church
- Founded: 1768
- Dedication: Saint Clare of Assisi

Architecture
- Style: Baroque
- Completed: 1781

Administration
- Archdiocese: Archdiocese of Goa and Daman

Church of St. Clara, also known as the St. Clara of Assisi Chapel, is a Roman Catholic church in Assonora, Goa, India. The church was built in 1768 and the religious order based in the Parish of St. Clare Church at Assonora is the Poor Sisters of Our Lady (PSOL), based at the Infant Jesus of Prague Convent, Auchit Waddo in Assonora.
