= Cunchelim =

- village
- Location in Goa, India Cunchelim (India)
- Coordinates: 15°36′0″N 73°49′0″E
- Country: India
- State: Goa
- District: North Goa
- Elevation: 14 m (46 ft)

Languages
  - Official: Konkani
- Time zone: UTC+5:30 (IST)
- Vehicle registration: GA
- Coastline: 0 kilometres (0 mi)
- Website: goa.gov.in

Cunchelim or Kucheli is a village in Bardez taluka, in the district of North Goa, in the state of Goa in India.

== Geography ==
It is located at 15°36′0″N 73°49′0″E at an elevation of 14 m above MSL. It occupies an area of 197.3 hectares.

== Location ==
Cunchelim lies at a distance of 2 km to the north of Mapusa. The village was originally located by the Haran River, but now includes the nearby plateau. It is bounded on the west by the village of Siolim, on the north by the village of Camurlim, on the east by the village of Colvale and by Caraswaddo, a suburb and Ward III of Mapusa.

== History ==
Cunchelim as a village has existed for centuries, as an agricultural settlement beside the Haran River that flows toward the Anjuna River. As a result, the villagers had close relationships with those of Siolim and Tivim.

Traditions of the villagers of Cunchelim state that they were settled by people from Tivim. The original Hindu deity of the village of Goa was called Barazann. The founding of the church and parish of St. Jerome (São Jerónimo) by the Franciscans headed by Fr. Jeronimo de Espirito Santo in 1594 at Mapusa, marks the establishment of Catholicism in the area. This parish church is sometimes known as the Church of Our Lady of the Miracles. The villages of Cunchelim and Corlim were placed under the parish of Mapusa. Those Hindu residents that fled the village during the Portuguese period and established themselves elsewhere are known by the name Kunchelkar.

Oral tradition states that the at São José Vaddo the original buildings were arranged around a narrow lane for protection against bands of Marathi "dacots" who would attack at night during the seventeenth century. The top of the lane was on high ground were villages would appoint a night guard that could overlook each hamlet.

The Jesuit Province of Malabar owned palm groves at Cunchelim in 1759 from which it earned an income and they continued to own the palm groves at Cunchelim in 1773 The village was within walking distance of Mapusa and was served by a chapel for daily prayer, but all major religious events took place at Mapusa, where in 1779 the church of St. Jerome was rebuilt. A map of Bardez, probably produced by a trainee cartographer in the British army around 1797-1800 clearly shows the chapel at Cunchelim. The village is shown on the sloping higher ground with rice fields on the floodplain. The village was a centre for agriculture, producing rice, coconuts, Cashew nuts, and buffalo milk. People lived on higher ground beside seasonal streams where their wells could access the high water table away from the rice fields and on the less valuable rocky ground that led to a small plateau. The slope was covered in thick forests which the villages harvested for building materials.

In 1842 a local cleric from the DeSouza family, Friar Manoel DeSouza was appointed rector of the Seminary of Rachol and held that post until 1859. Perhaps as a result of his position the chapel of Cunchelim was given a new provision of erection on 20 December 1847, though it remained filial to the Parish of Mapusa. The plots and palm groves owned by the Jesuit Province of Malabar at Cunchelim remained in their possession until 1862. According to one reference the village had a revenue of £908:00 in 1876 Though this was more than many other villages in Goa, it was still quite low. Among the families that lived at Cunchelim at this time was the Almeida family who married into the Pinto family of Candolim. The later were famous for their part in the Pinto Rebellion. In 1877 the local chapel was dedicated to Our Lady of Flight (Nossa Senhora da Fuga). Cunchelim became more involved with the outside world in early nineteenth century with the creation of a school with a chair of Latin at Mapusa. This institution was to pave the way for better education and therefore job prospects in British India (especially Bombay). A road connecting Cunchelim with Mapusa and Colvale was built by 1876 and smaller tracks connected the village to Tivim. Young men of the village started to leave for Bombay where they would seek work in the British Indian civil service or with the growing number of steamship companies. Some young men even ventured to British East Africa, finding employment in present-day Kenya and Uganda.

During the First World War some of the Cunchelim Goans served as volunteers in East Africa, especially in Kenya and Uganda. Others returned to the village and built their large houses. In the interwar years there was more emigration to East Africa. But in the Second World War some Cunchelim Goans, especially those in Mombasa were evacuated with their families to neutral Portuguese Goa.

The legacy of non-permanent migration mainly of men to East Africa is in the number of early twentieth century houses in the village built by the returning "Afrikanders" and their income from Africa. By the mid-twentieth century many families moved to other parts of India and to Africa. Many never returned and their old grand houses fell to ruins. In the later twentieth century like other Goans many people from Cunchelim emigrated to the Persian Gulf seeking work in Kuwait, Bahrain, Dubai and Oman. Their wealth has helped greatly in the upkeep of the village institutions (the church, cemetery, houses, etc.). The church of Our Lady of Flight (Nossa Senhora da Fuga) was separated from the Mapusa parish in 1977.

== Government ==
Cunchelim falls within the jurisdiction of Mapusa Municipal Council. The village comprises Ward I and Ward II of the municipality and since the Goa state municipal elections of 2015, is represented by Mr Chandrashekar Benakar from Ward I and Mrs Alpa Anand Bhaidkar from Ward II.

Cunchelim forms part of 05-Mapusa Legislative Assembly constituency, which is represented by Mr Joshua Peter D'Souza of the Bharatiya Janata Party. It also forms part of 01-North Goa Lok Sabha/Parliamentary Constituency, represented by Union Minister of State for Defence and AYUSH, Mr Shripad Yesso Naik, elected on the Bharatiya Janata Party ticket.

== Transportation ==
Cunchelim is connected by bus to the towns of Mapusa and Panaji/Panjim and to the villages of Morjim, Chopdem, Siolim, Camurlim and Colvale. Buses operated by private owners and Kadamba Transport Corporation halt at several stops across the village. Buses connecting to other towns and villages within Goa; to Mumbai and Pune in Maharashtra state and to Karwar, Belagavi, Hubbali, Dharwad, Mangaluru in Karnataka state can be boarded at Mapusa bus terminus. The nearest railway station is at an approximate distance of 8 km at Tivim/Thivim, on the Konkan Railway line, connecting to Mumbai, Margao and Mangaluru. The nearest wharf or jetty is 10 km to the south at Panaji/Panjim city. The nearest airport is Dabolim International Airport, at an approximate distance of 41 km to the south.

== Facilities ==
- Cunchelim sports grounds and clubhouse
- Weekly market on Fridays at Mapusa town
- Mauli provision store
- Landmark supermarket
- Nora's Beauty Parlour
- Saiba Bar & Restaurant
- Goa State Horticultural Corporation licensed vegetable and fruit kiosks

== Institutions ==
- Government Primary School, Marathi medium
- Communidade of Cunchelim

== Places of interest ==
- The Church of Our Lady of Flight or Nossa Senhora da Fuga
- Shree Datta Saunsthan Temple
- Kuntla Spring
