= Nachinola =

- village
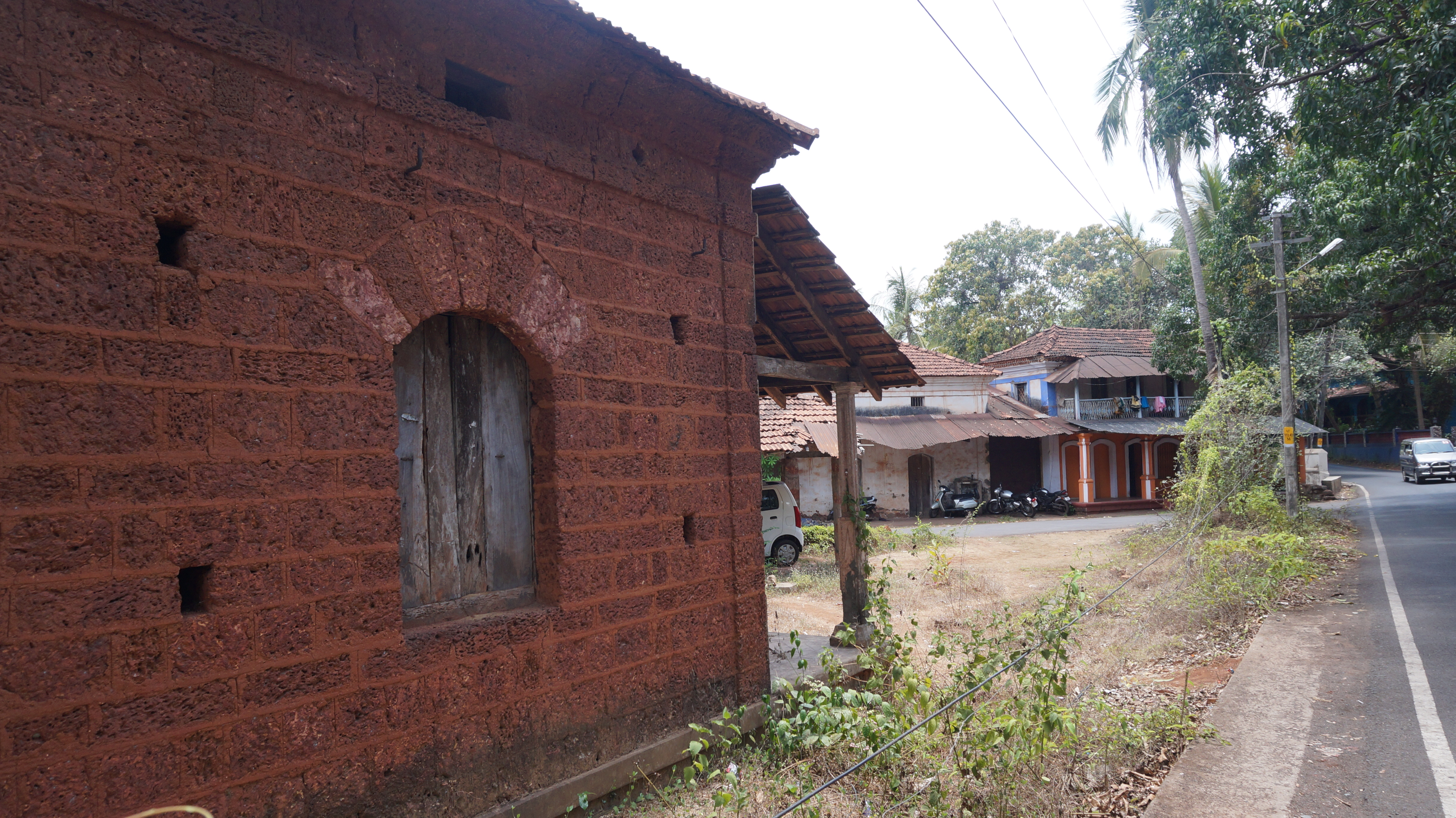
- Main road at Nachinola

- Location in Goa, India Nachinola (India)
- Coordinates: 15°35′N 73°51′E
- Country: India
- State: Goa
- District: North Goa

Languages
  - Official: Konkani
- Time zone: UTC+5:30 (IST)
- Telephone code: 009183228
- Vehicle registration: GA
- Nearest city: Mapusa
- Literacy: 95%
- Website: goa.gov.in

Nachinola is a small village in North Goa district, Goa, India. It is situated in Bardez taluka (sub-district) between the villages Moira and Aldona. Nachinola is divided into three vadde (village sub-divisions) that are called Vainguinn, Zoidar, and Borvonn. For administrative purposes, Panarim, a vaddo of Aldona, is also considered to be a part of Nachinola. Nachinola village is hidden from the main road that passes through it and connects Mapusa to Aldona.

== Population ==
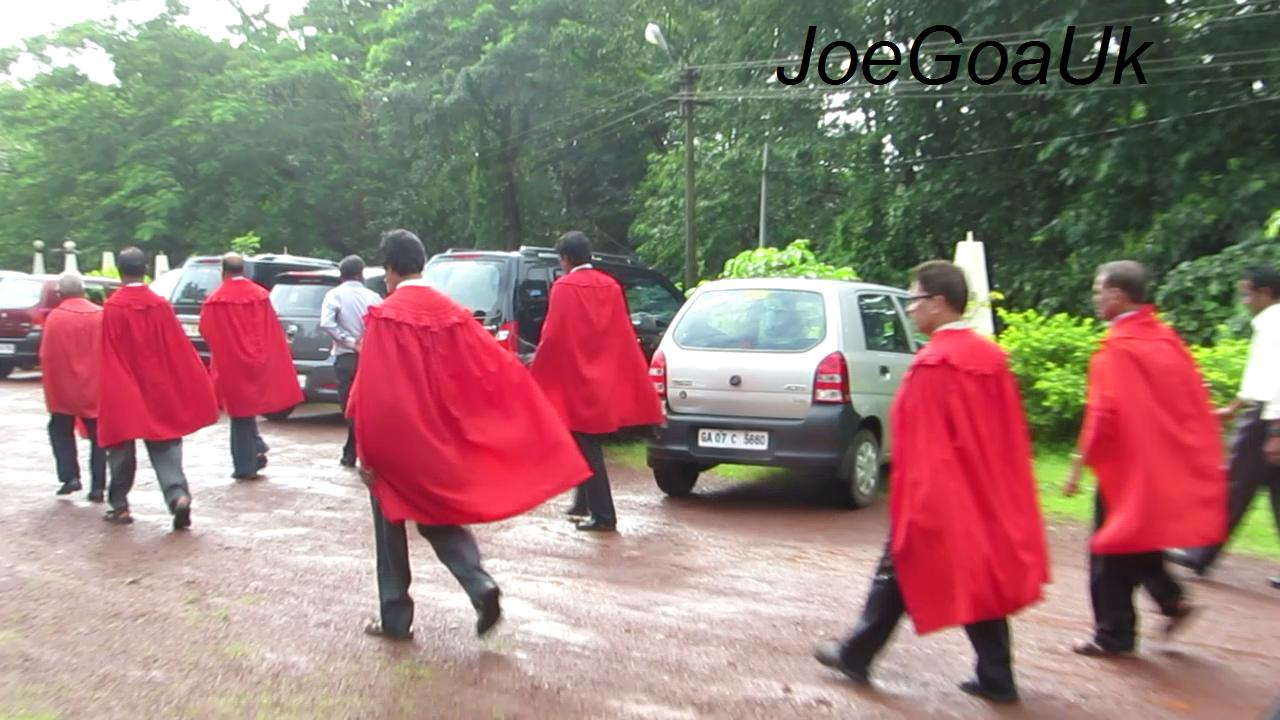
A Catholic funeral in Nachinola

In 2011, Nachinola had a population of 2,725 and a literacy rate of 88.6%. It had 645 households. Of these, 1,360 were male and 1,365 female. In the 0–6 years demographic were 252 children, comprising 144 male and 108 female. Of its population, 2,191 – 1,105 males and 1,086 females – were literate. The Census of India also showed Nachinola to cover 244.05 hectares (603.1 acres).

The Nachinola comunidade, or ancestral village community, is considered to be one of the twelve Brahmin comunidades of Bardez.

== Church ==
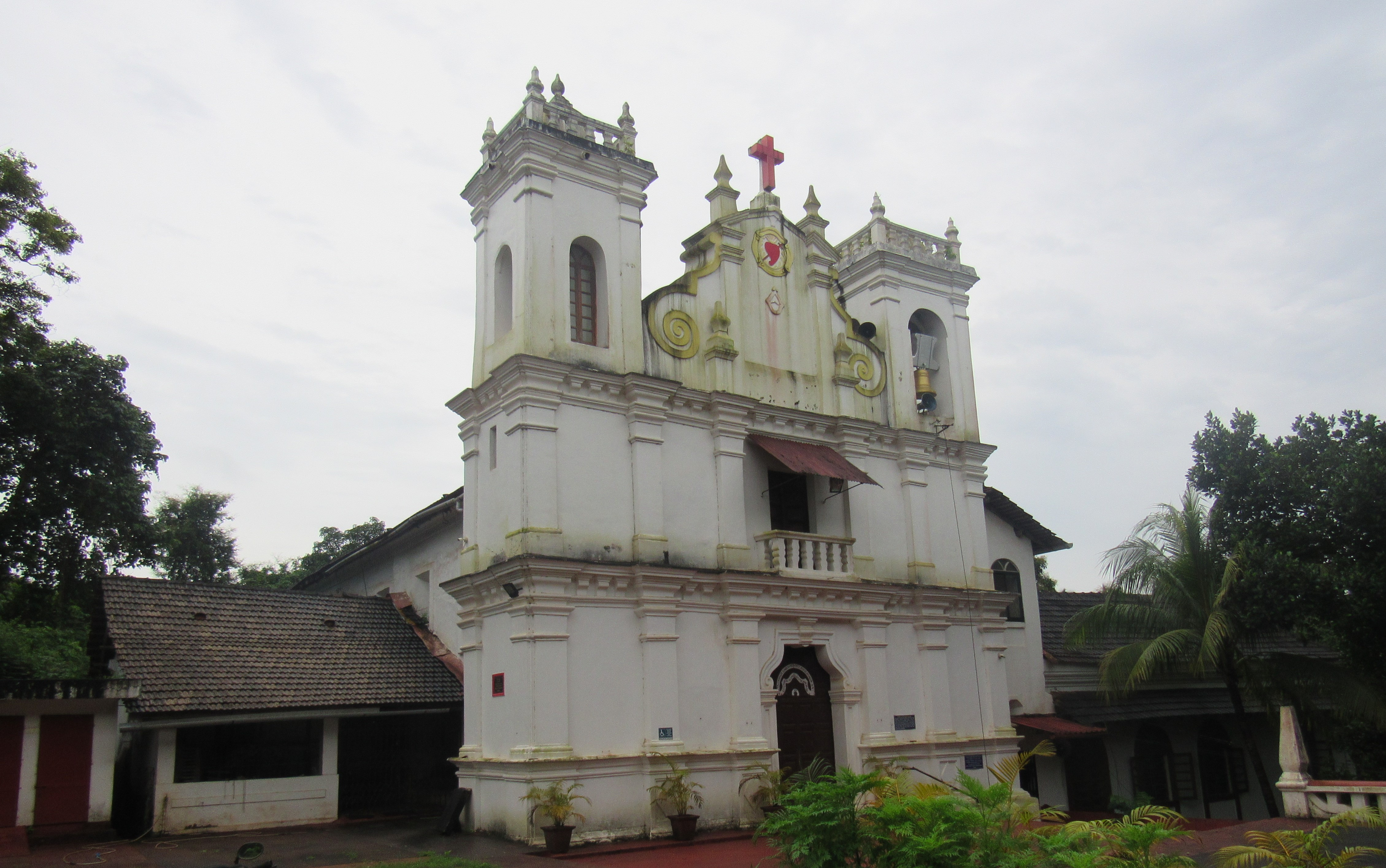
Church of Bom Jesu at Nachinola, Bardez, Goa

The church in Nachinola was built in 1676; it is dedicated to Bom Jesus and celebrates the feasts of Santissimo Sacramento e Bom Jesus (1 January) and Sta. Ana (June). The Jesuit Fr. Moreno De Souza wrote that the small church lies tucked away in a corner and does not get noticed much.

Engineer-author José Lourenço describes its architecture as Mannerist Neo-Roman in style. It is large with three bays and three storeys. Its main door has a bracketed arch. The frontispiece has Rococo curves flanking a broken pediment that frames a relief of the Sacred Heart. Spear finials top the frontispiece. Twin bell towers with balusters and finials are of the urn type.

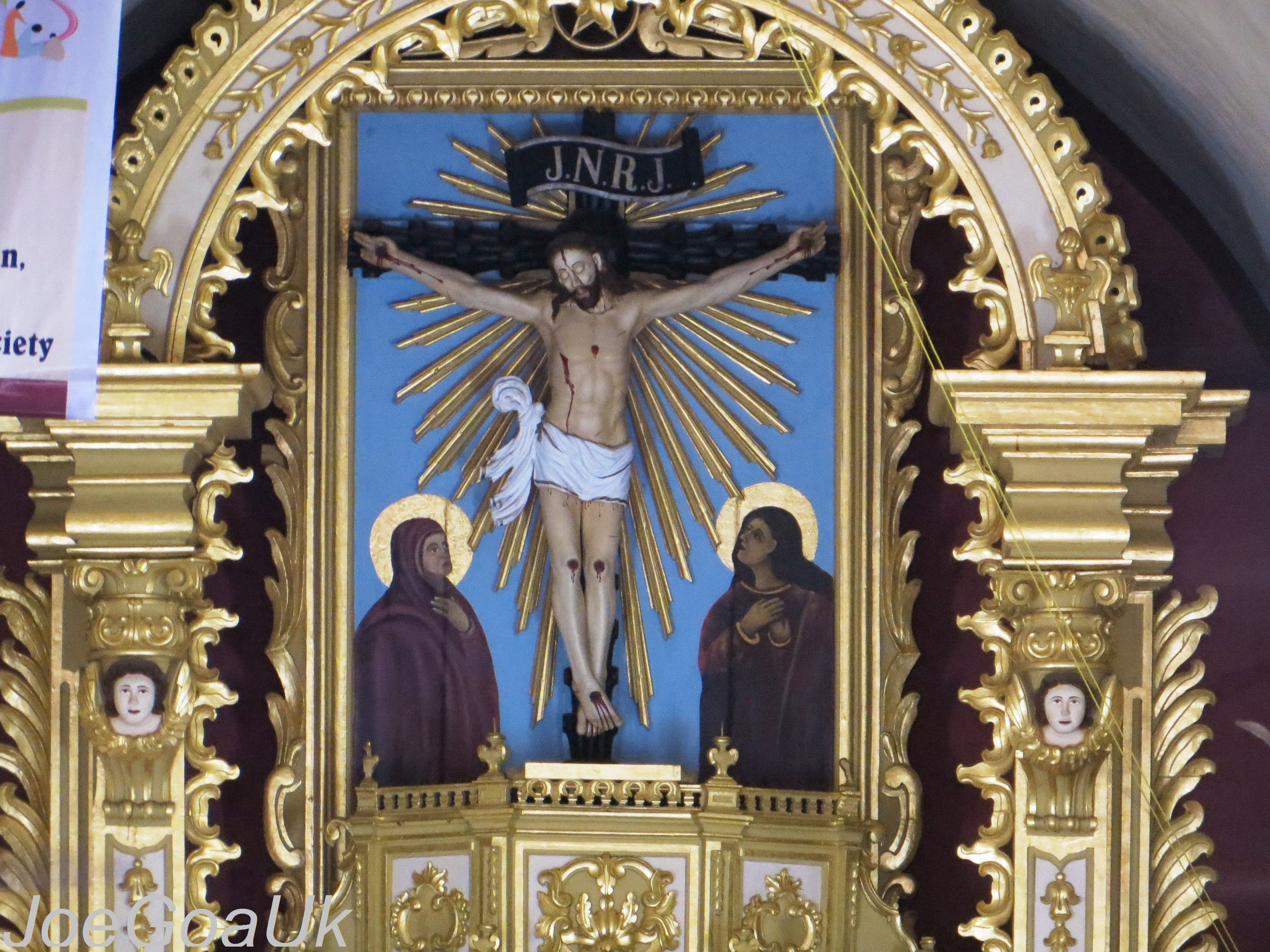
Inside altars.

Nachinola and its neighbouring village Ucassaim have a unique relationship in participating in each other's feasts. Nachinola celebrates its Bom Jesus feast on January 1 each year and Ucassaim celebrates the feast of Saude Saibinn (Our Lady of Good Health) on the first Sunday of February, the confaria (a church local body) of each village invites neighbouring confraria, parishioners and parish priest for the feast of the other.

The cemetery was expanded and blessed by Goa Archbishop Filipe Neri Ferrão on June 20, 1998.

== Temples ==
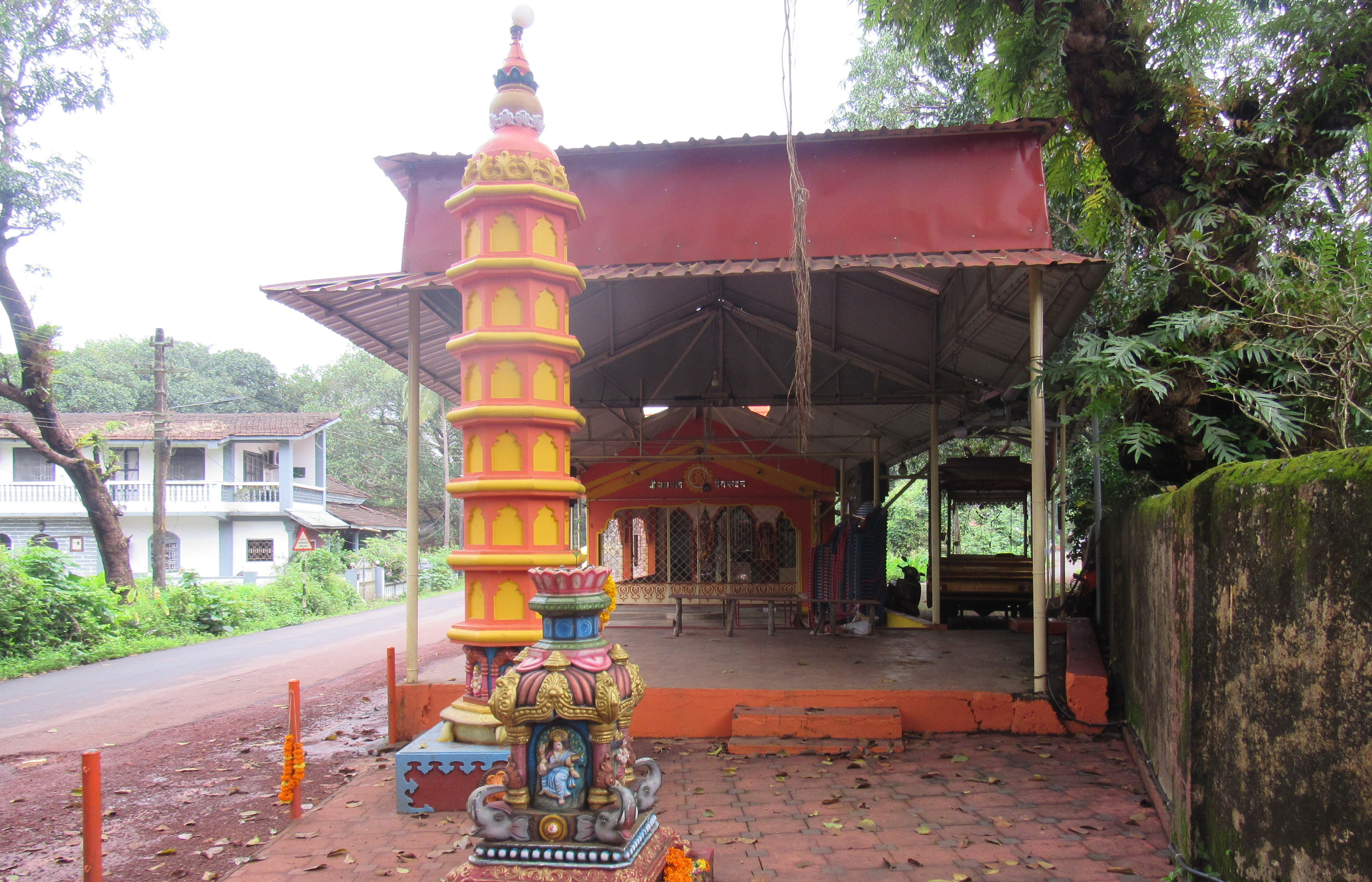
Ganapati Devasthan

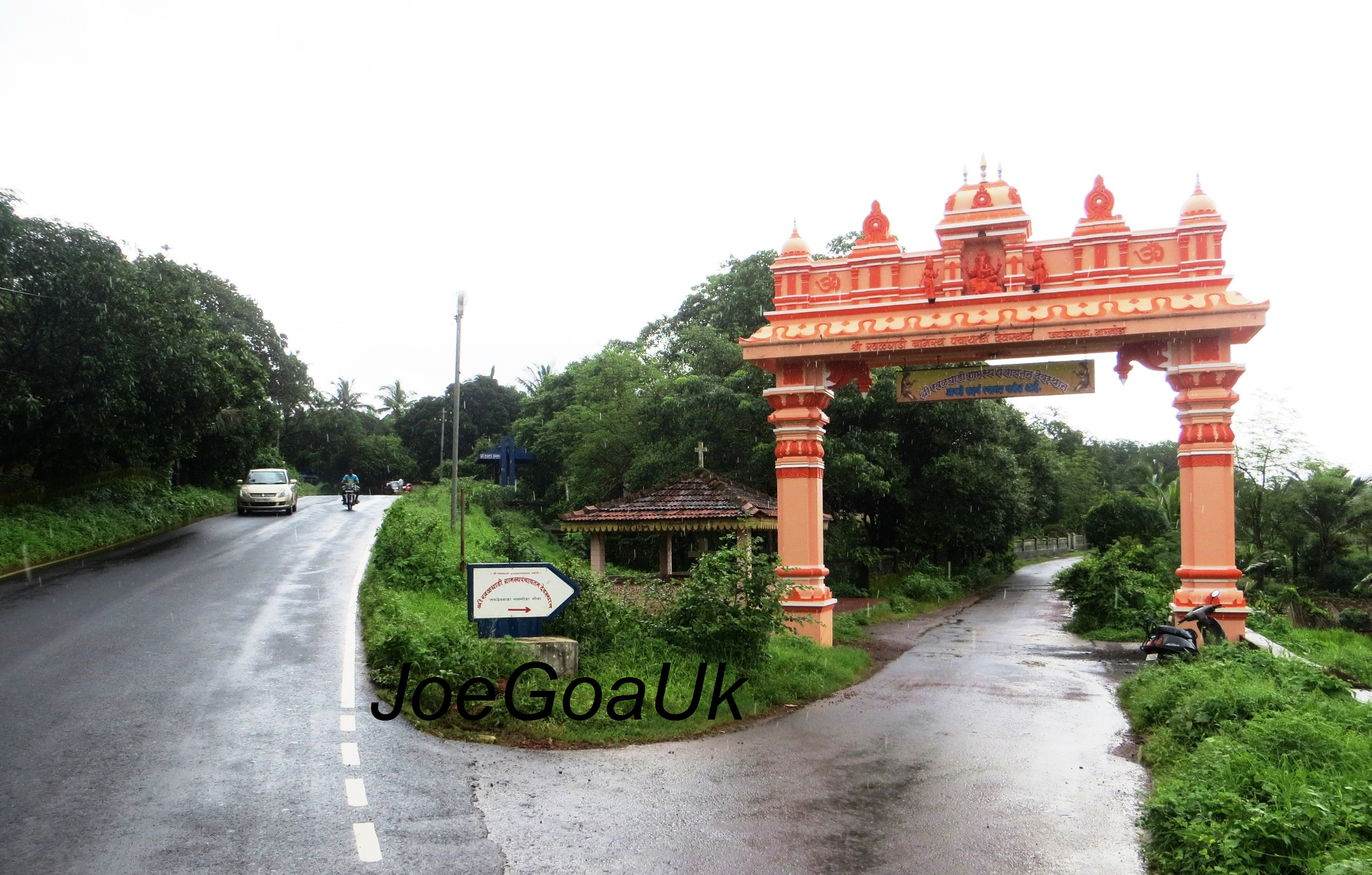
Ravalgaddi Temple, in or en route to Nachinola

According to Rui Gomes Pereira, prior to conversions, the area had temples devoted to Ramanatha, Malkumi (Mahalakshimi), Gram-purusha, Ravalnatha, Vetall and Gopinatha.

Deities Vetall, Ramanatha, Mahalakshimi and Ravalnatha were shifted to Advalpale of Bicholim, due to religious intolerance in colonial Goa. Vetall was the main deity and the others were affiliates. There are believed to have been other deities in the temple.

The comunidade (traditional village body) consists of twelve vangors (clans). Its members, known as gaunkars, are of Brahmin ancestry. Mahajans at the Advalpale temple use the common surname Nashnodkar, tracing to their village of origin. They belong to castes of Gaud Saraswat Brahmins, Daivadna Brahmins, ironsmiths, Marathas and Bhandaris. Earlier, according to Gomes Pereira, the village had as its gaunkars people with the surname of Porobo (Prabhu).

== Institutions ==
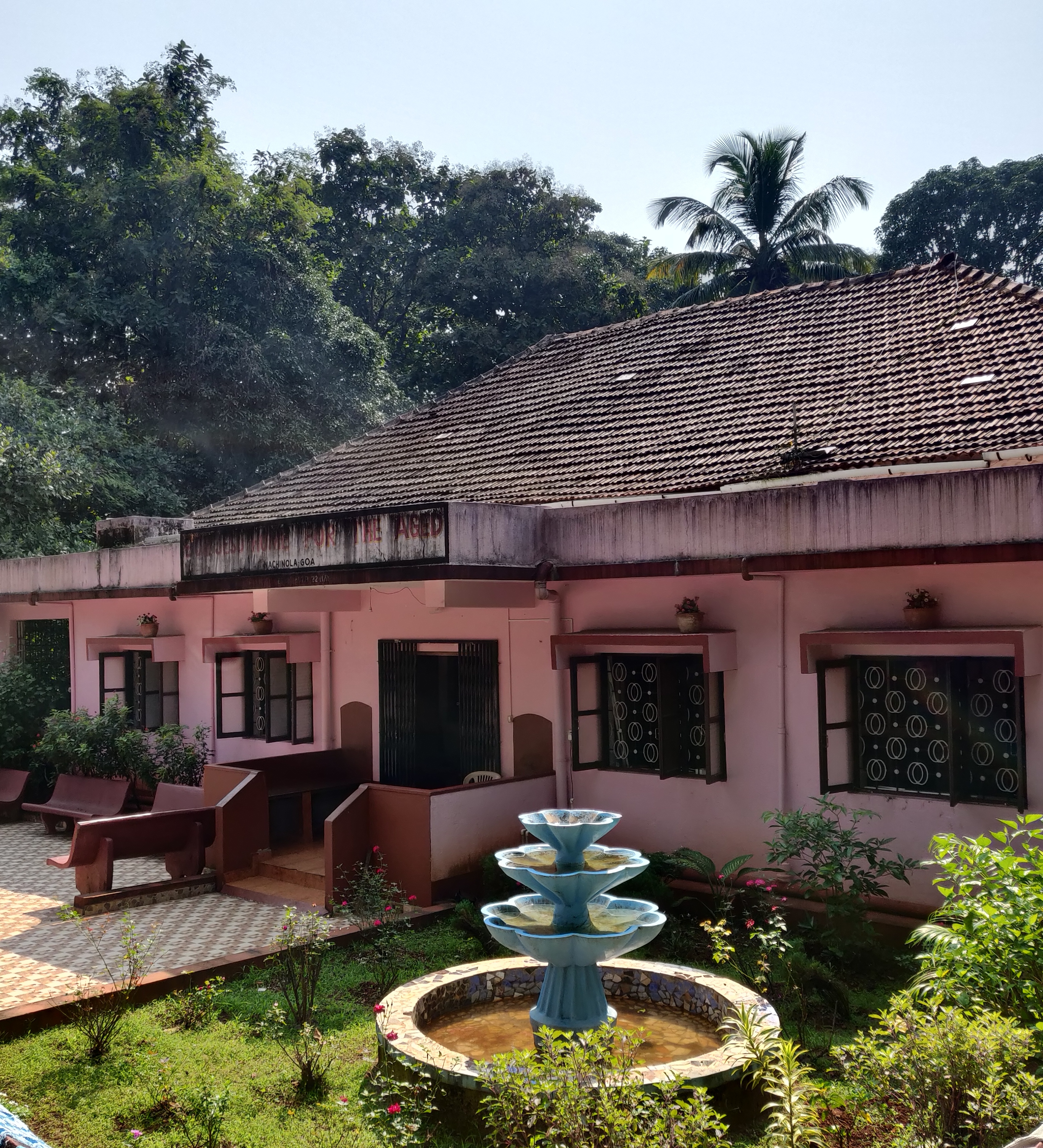
Bom Jesus Home for the Aged, Nachinola, Goa

Nachinola has its own panchayat (local assembly).

Nachinola also has a home for the aged, called the Bom Jesus Home for the Aged. It is run by the Missionary Sisters of the Queen of the Apostles (SRA Sisters).

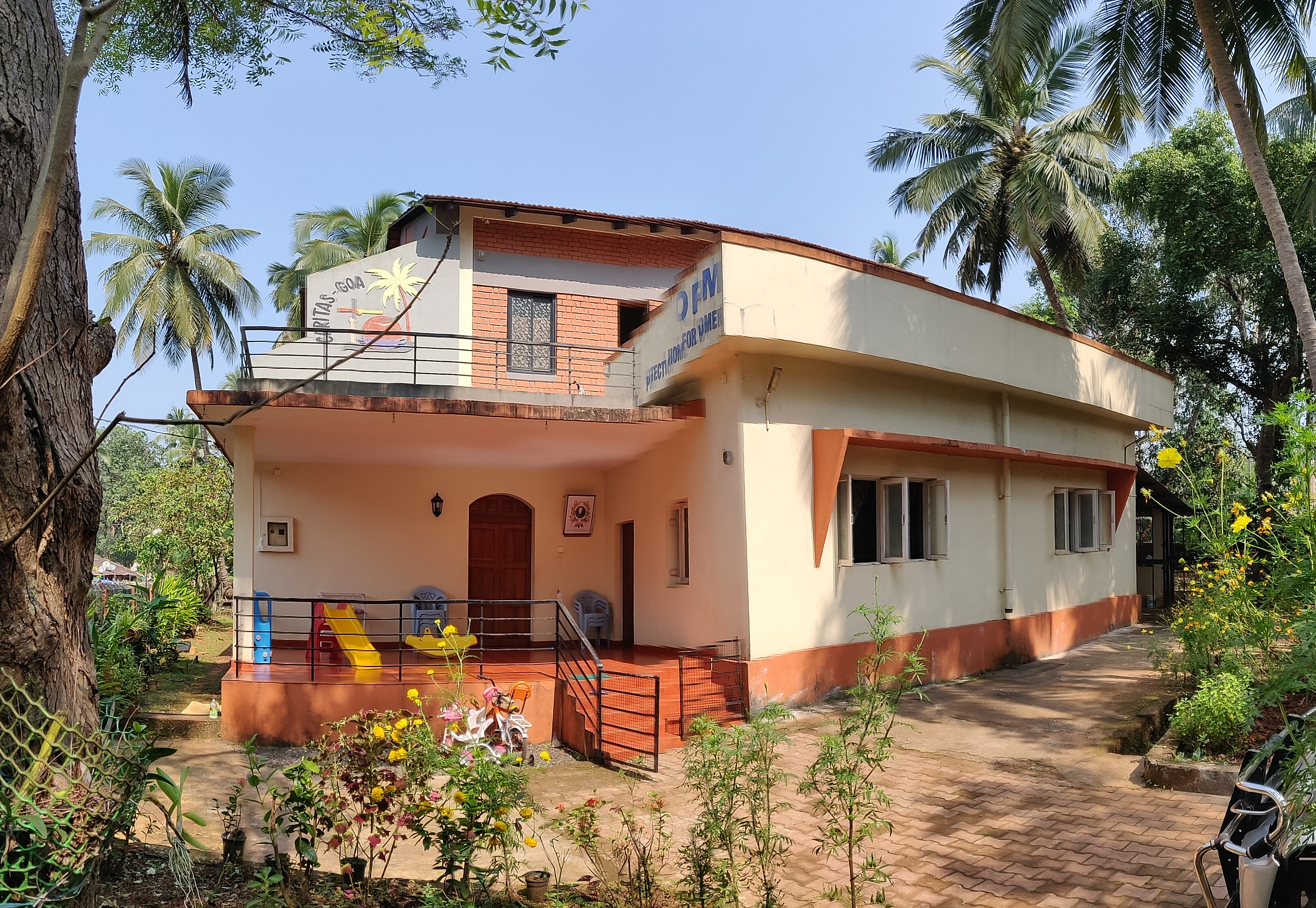
OPM (Caritas' Obra de Protecao a Mulher) Nachinola, Goa

The Caritas orphanage Obra de Proteção a Mulher, one of only two homes in Goa that are adoption agencies, is run by the Congregation of Sisters Adorers Handmaids of the Blessed Sacrament and of Charity (AASC). It is a creche for children under seven years of age.

Socio Cultural association Nachinola is a club established since 1973. https://www.google.nl/maps/place/Socio+cultural+association+Nachinola/@15.5866779,73.8538639,17z/data=!3m1!4b1!4m5!3m4!1s0x3bbf9578ae98215b:0xe334b05559127efb!8m2!3d15.5866779!4d73.8560526?hl=nl

== Origins of the name ==
According to one version of how the village got its name, a talented dancer called Nola would be encouraged to dance with pleas of "Nach go Nola, nach go Nola" (Do dance, Nola); this saw its name change from "Nachnola" to "Nachinola".

== In the news ==
During the 2020 lockdown in Goa during the COVID-19 pandemic, Nachinola was in the news when some of its villagers took to helping those in need. In August 2020, farmers from Nachinola complained waterlogging in their fields was destroying crops because the drains had not been de-silted and the problem was ongoing for two years. They had approached the Bardez Zonal Agricultural Office over this issue and sought an inspection. Village youth undertook clean-up drives.

== Gallery ==
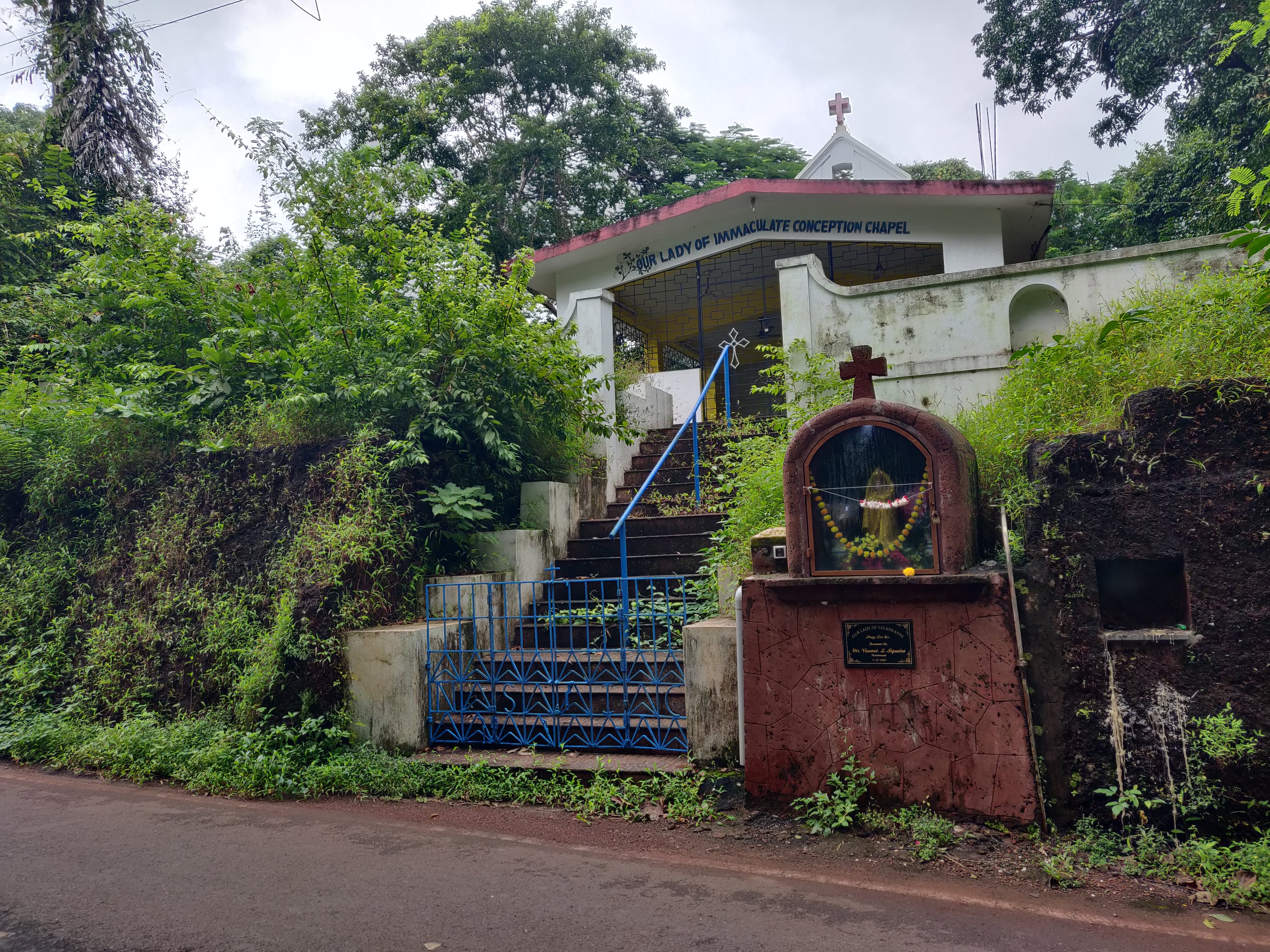
Our Lady of Immaculate Conception Chapel

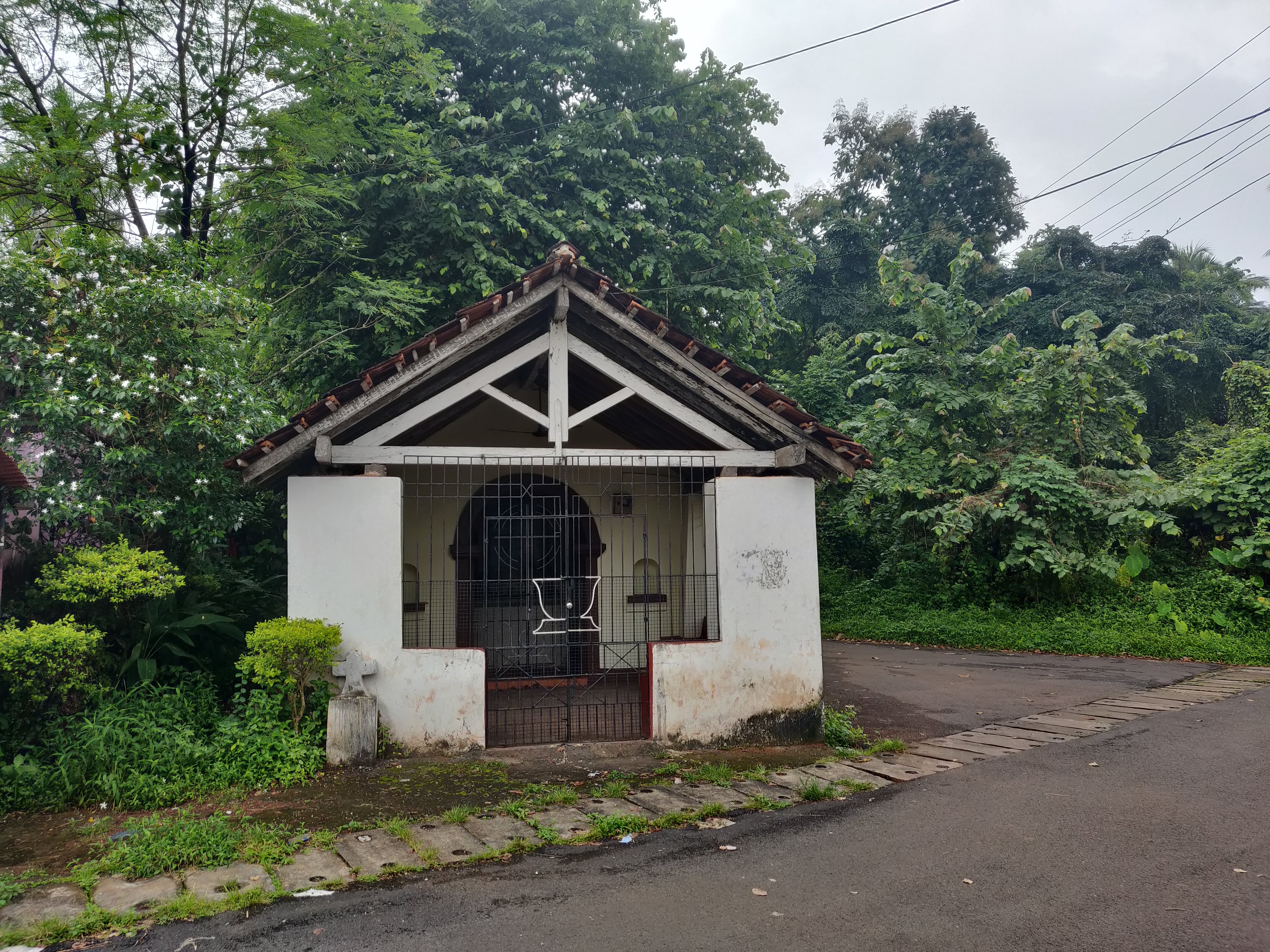
Holy Cross Chapel

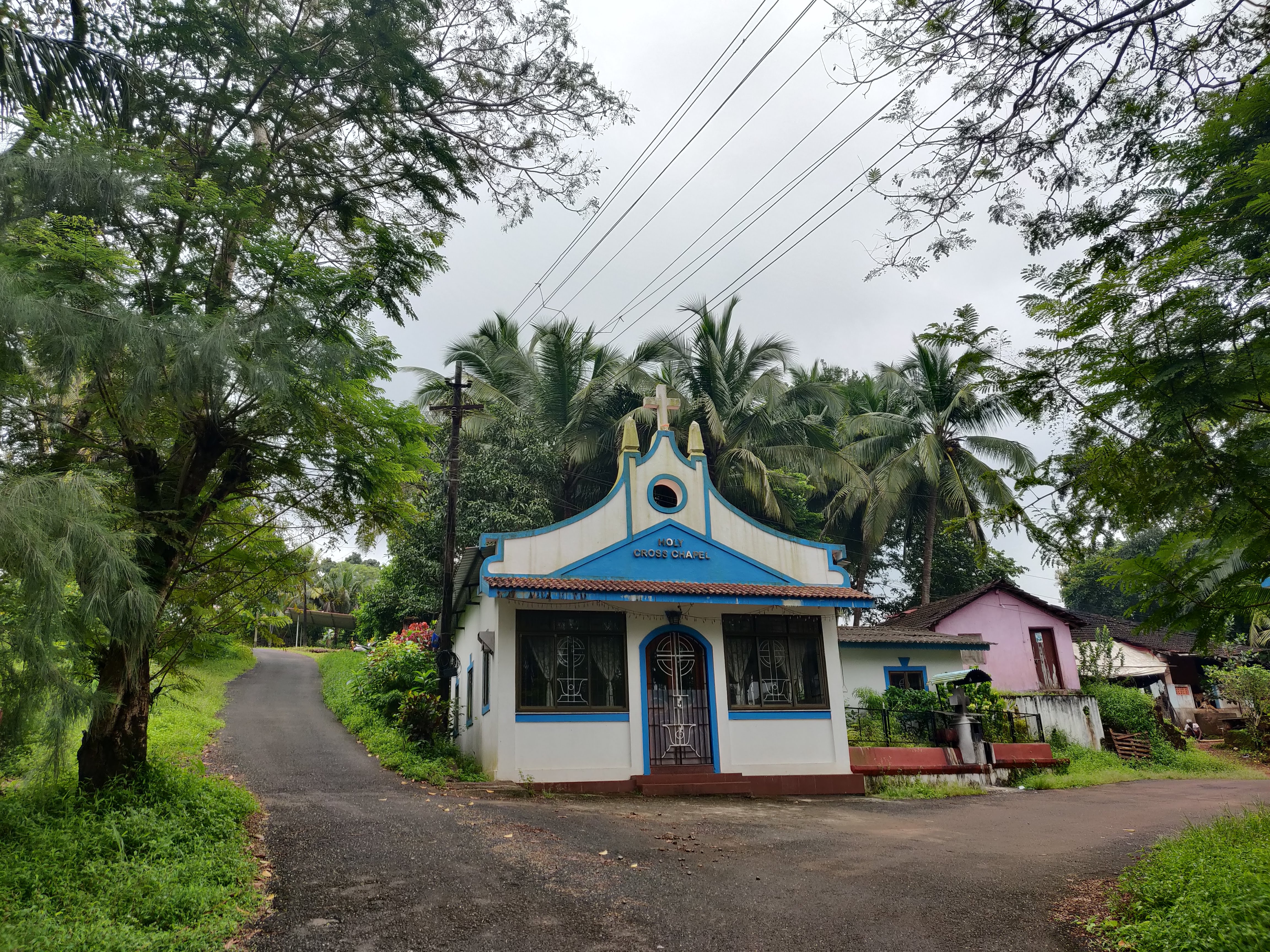
Holy Cross Chapel

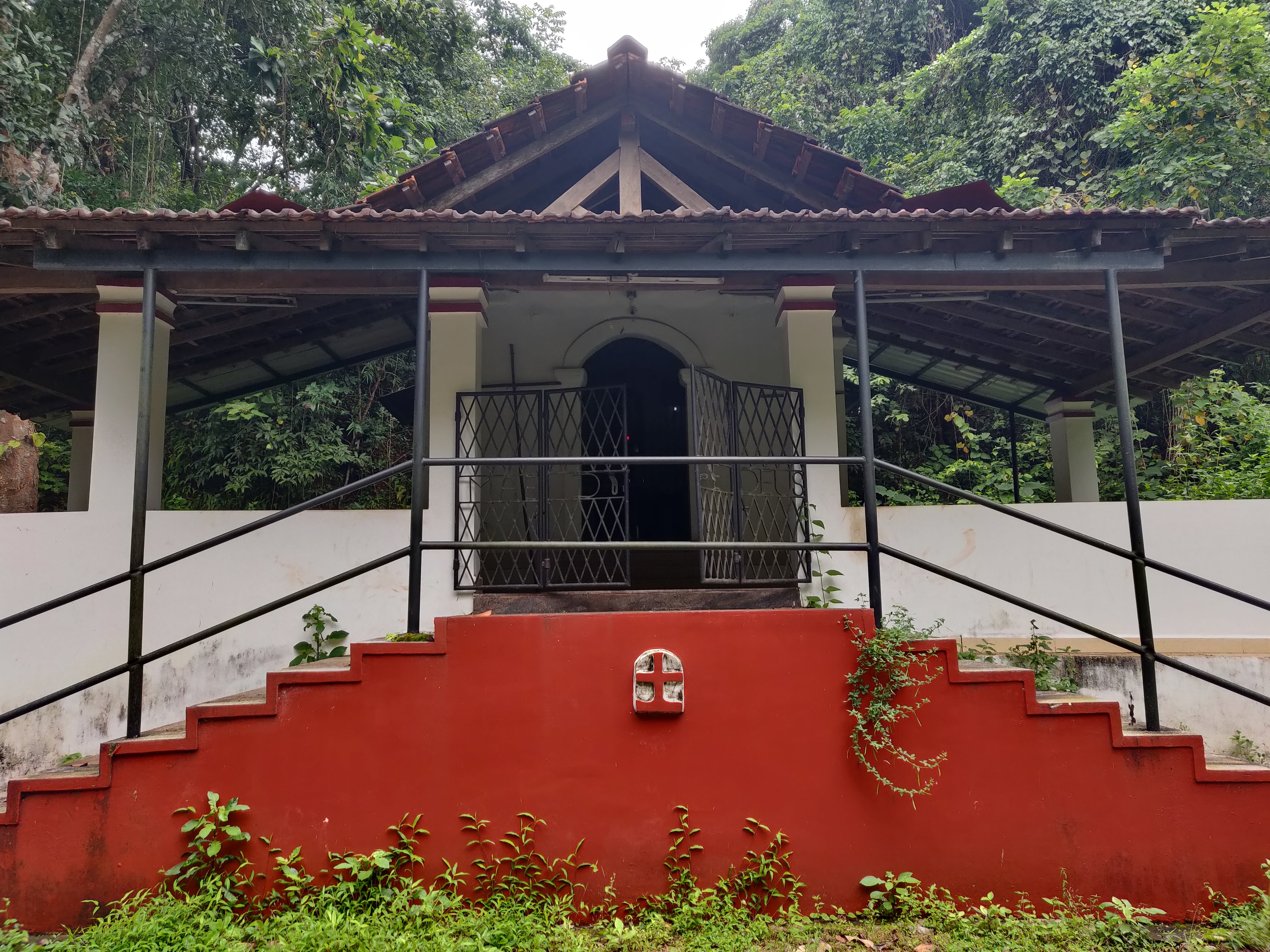
Mae de Deus Chapel

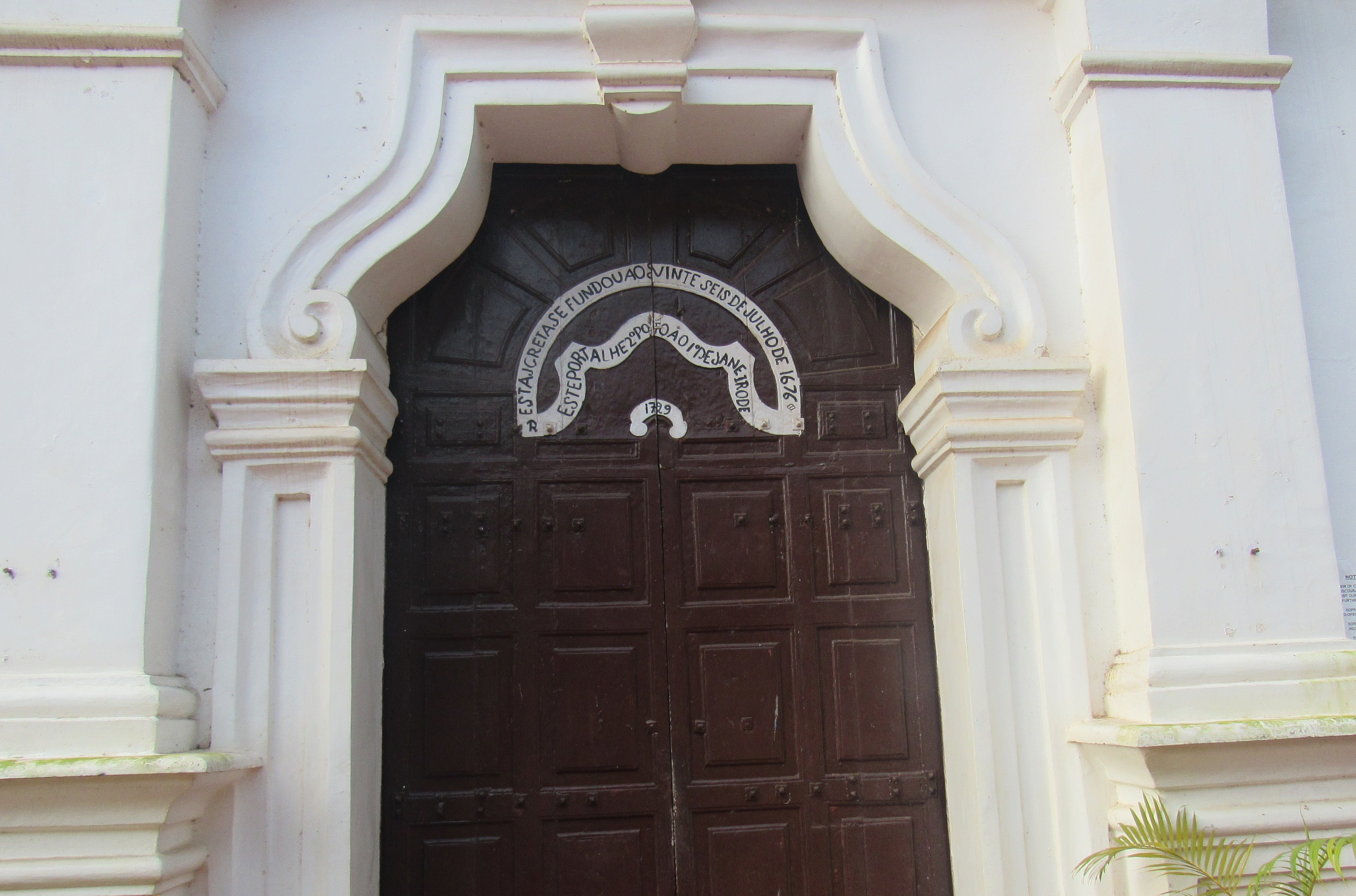
Main entrance of Bom Jesus Church, Nachinola

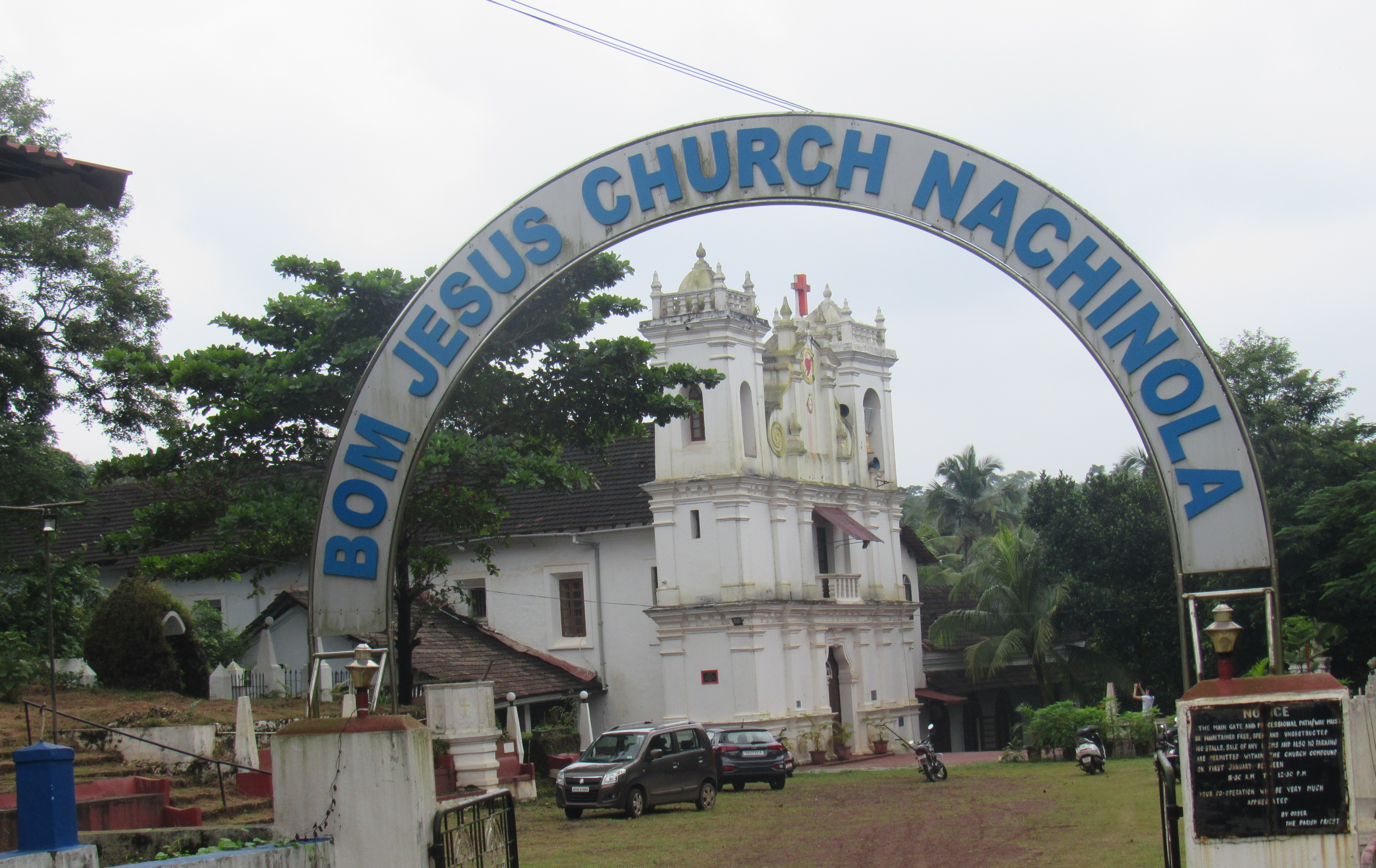
Bom Jesus Church

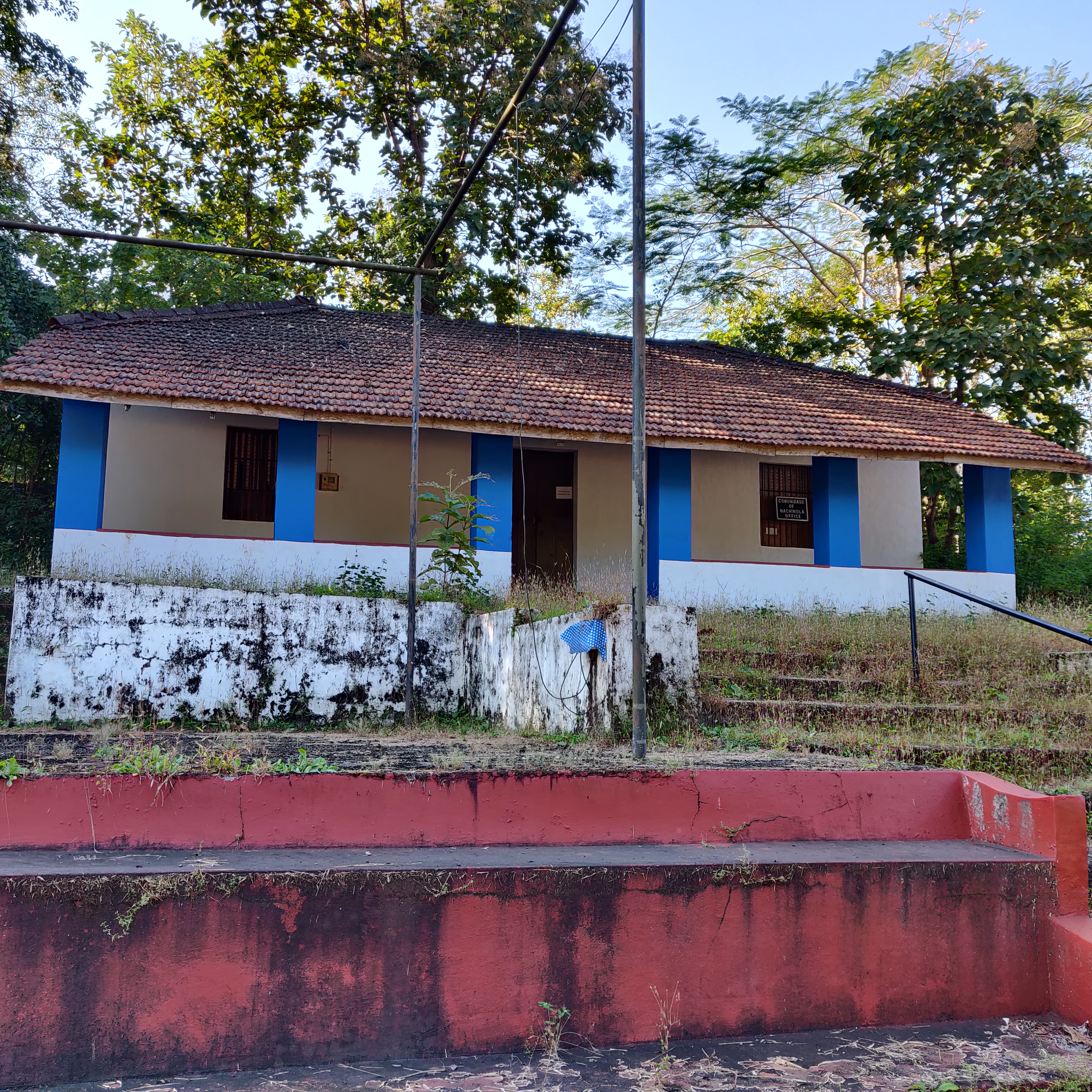
Comunidade of Nachinola Office

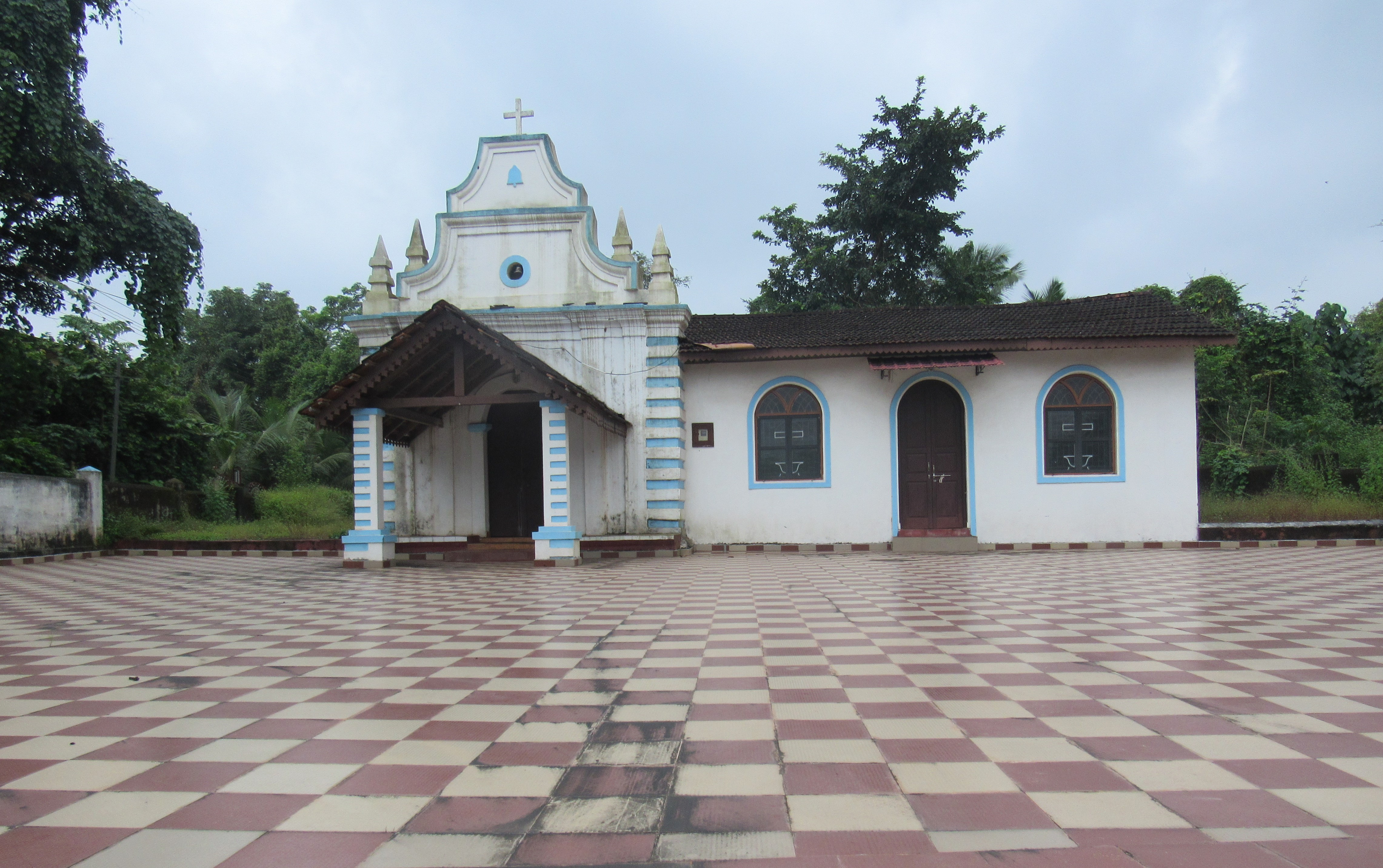
Holy Cross Chapel

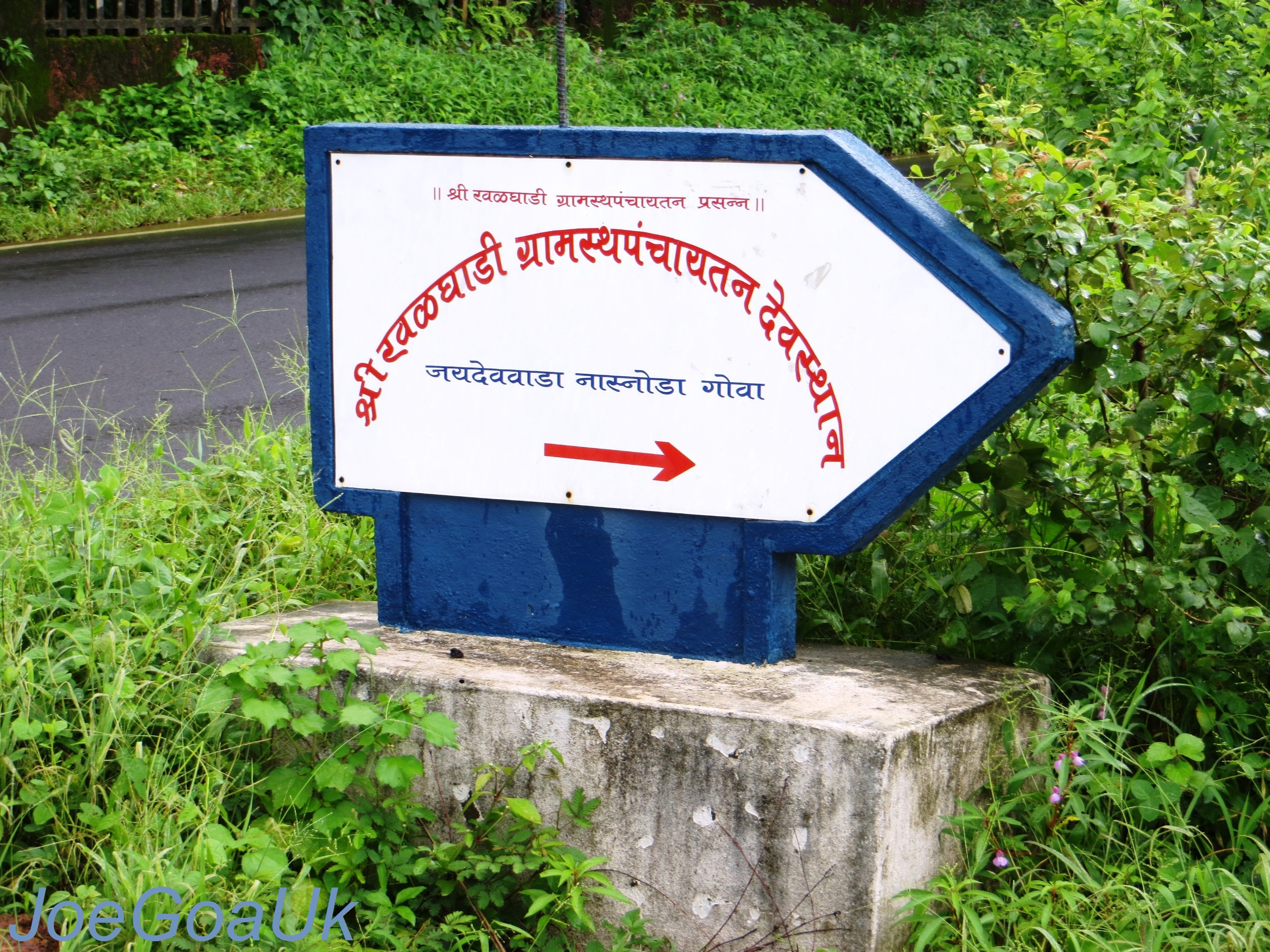
Ravalgaddi Temple

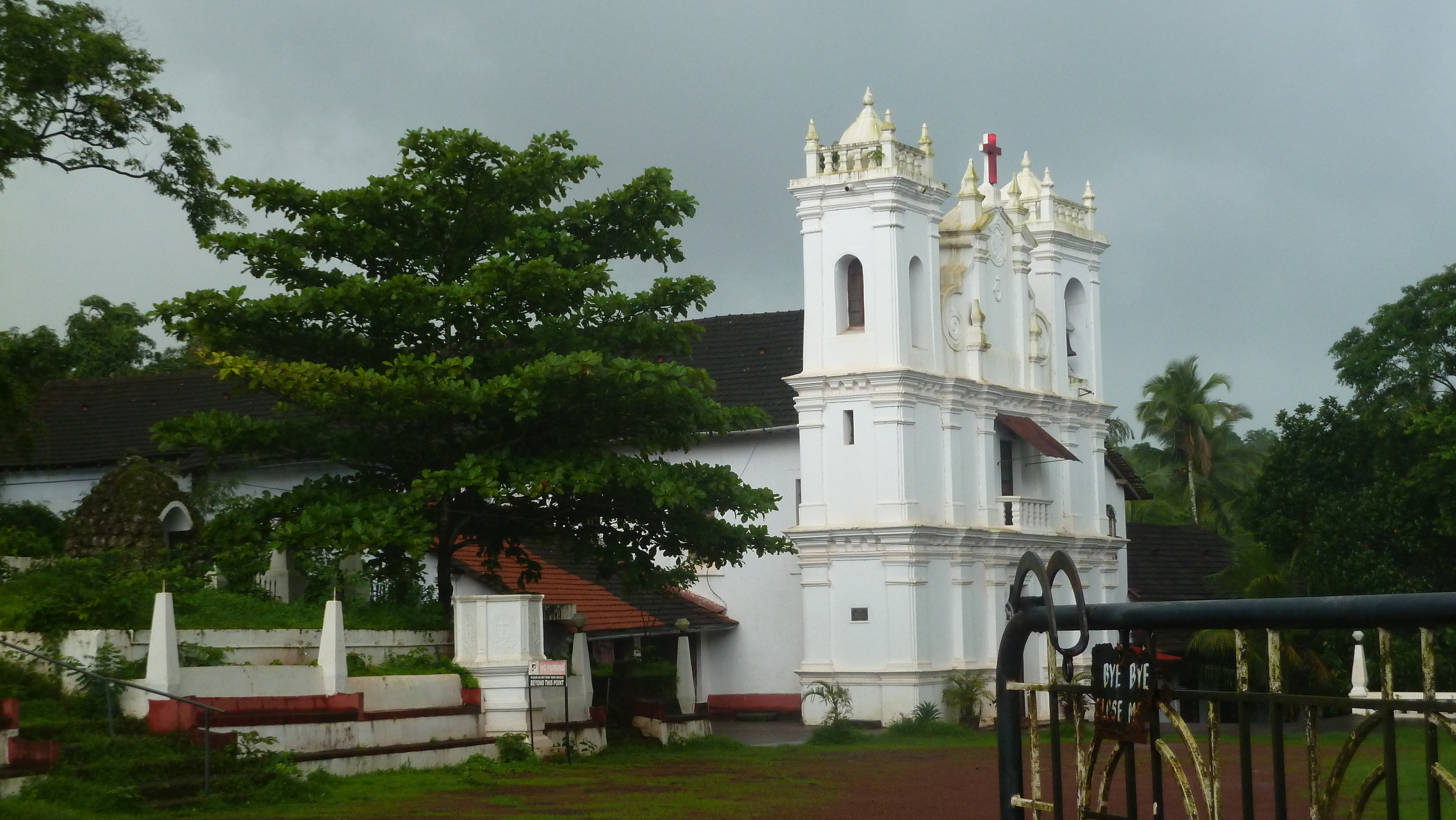
Bom Jesus Church

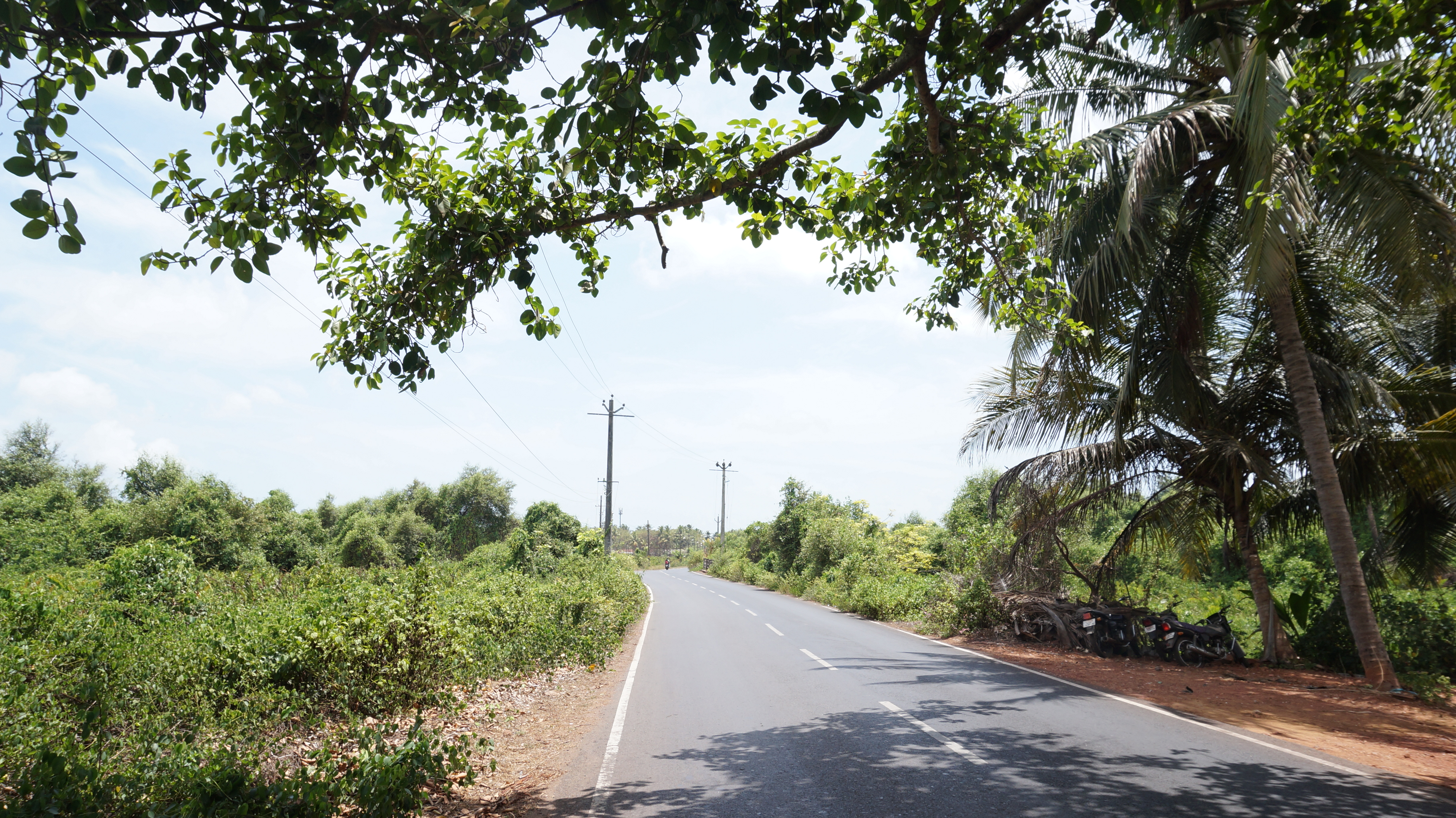
Along the road to Moira and Nachinola

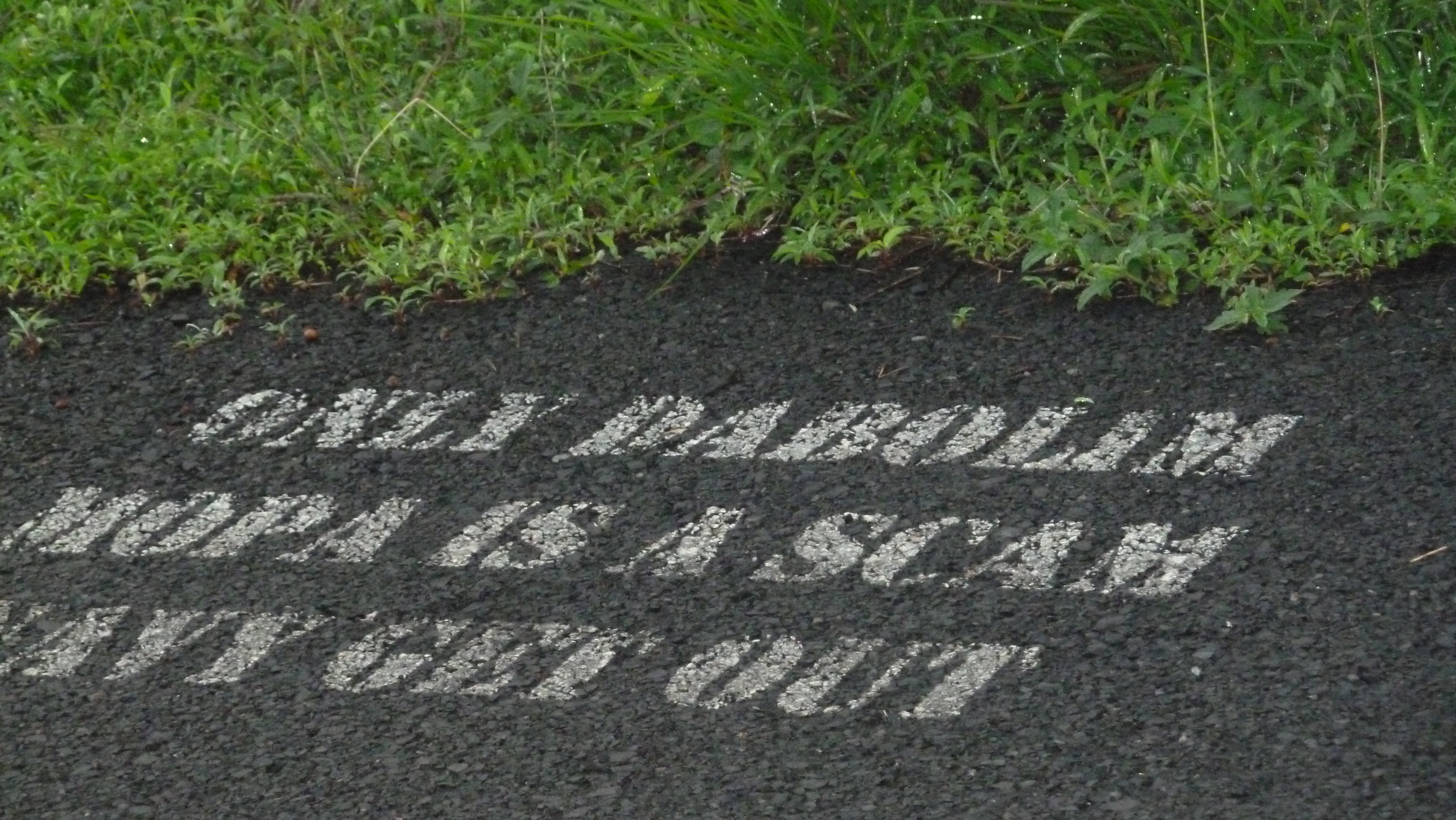
Protest sign at the road

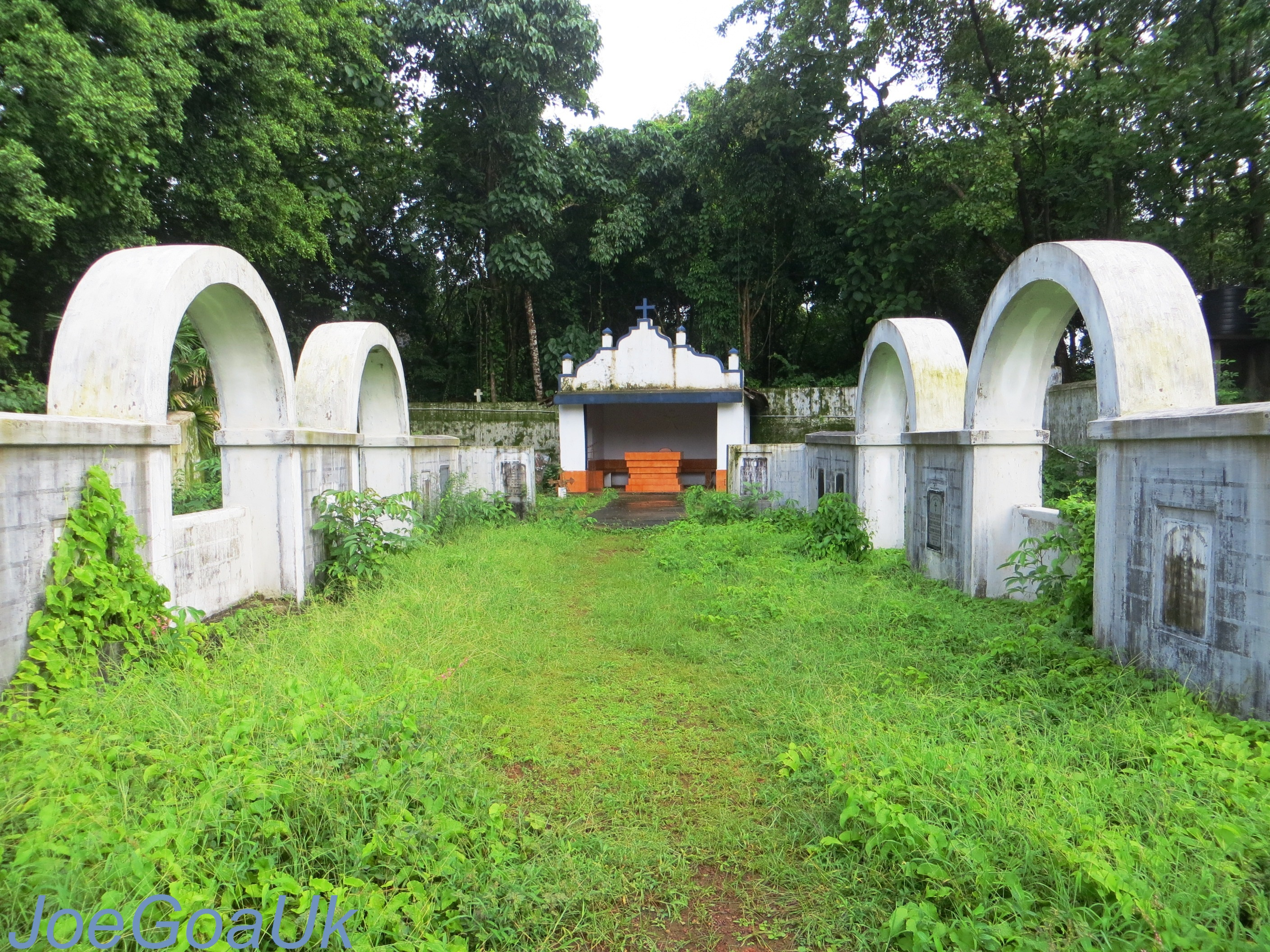
Village cemetery

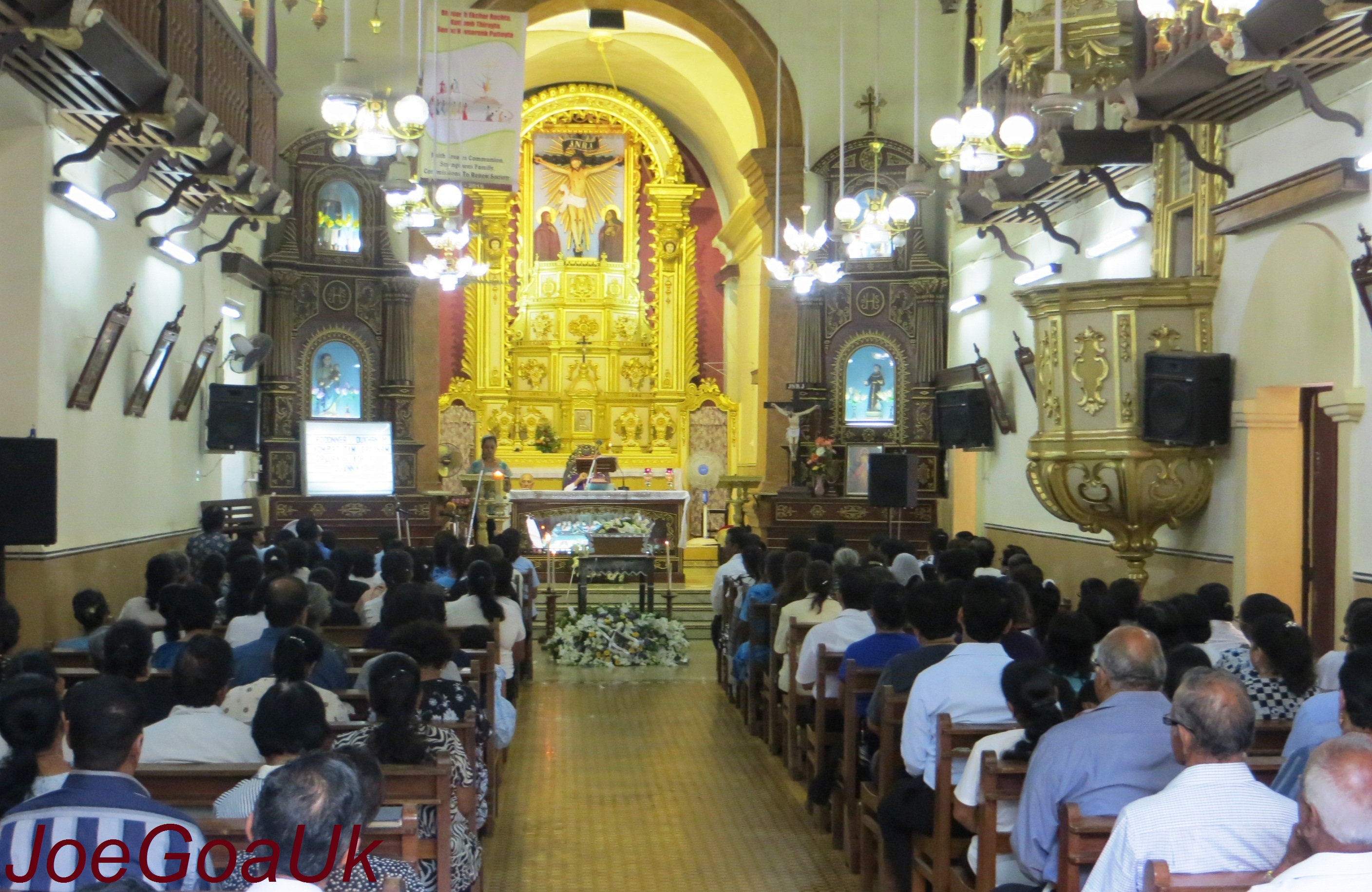
Funeral at the village church

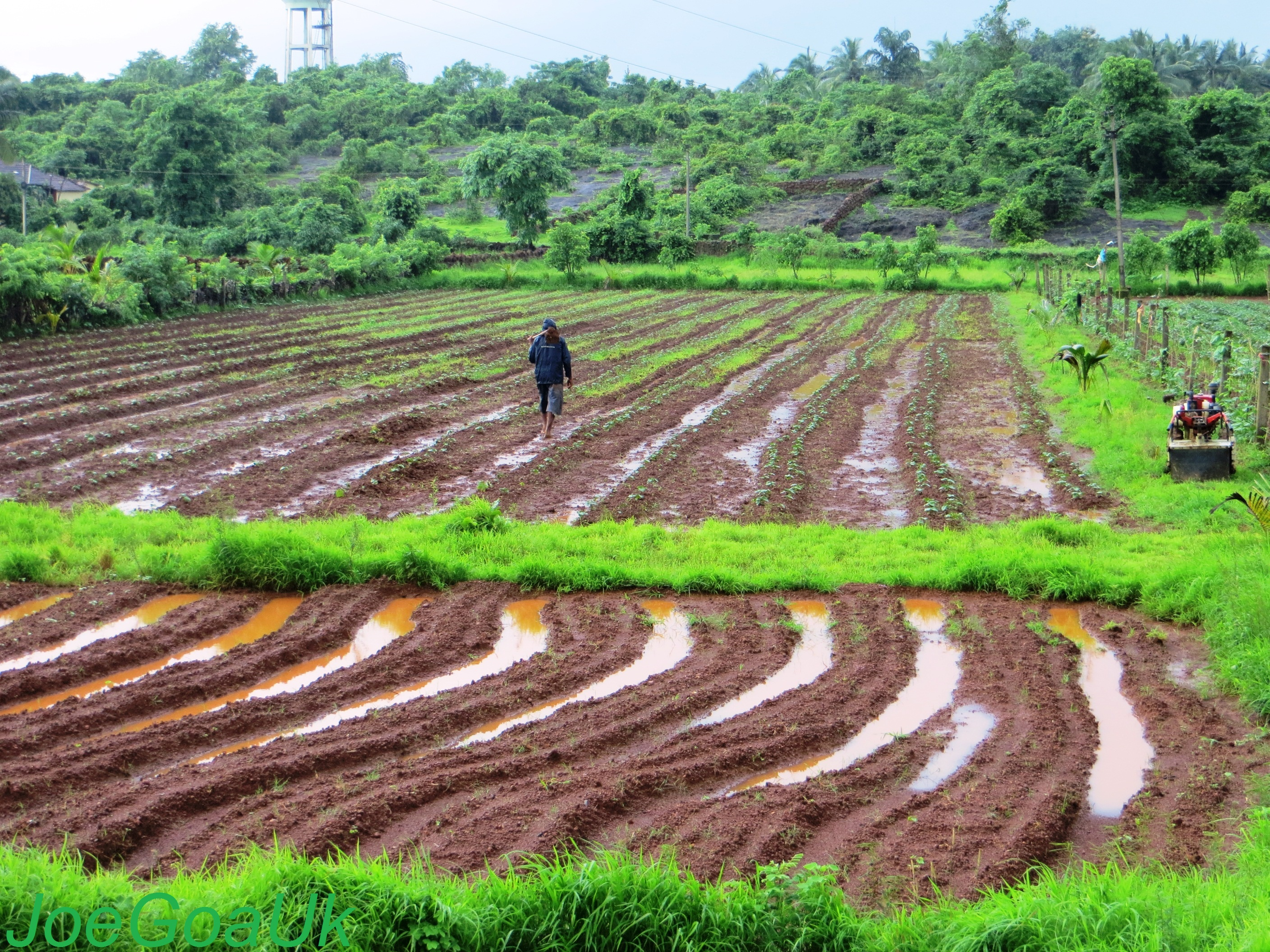
Farmers at work

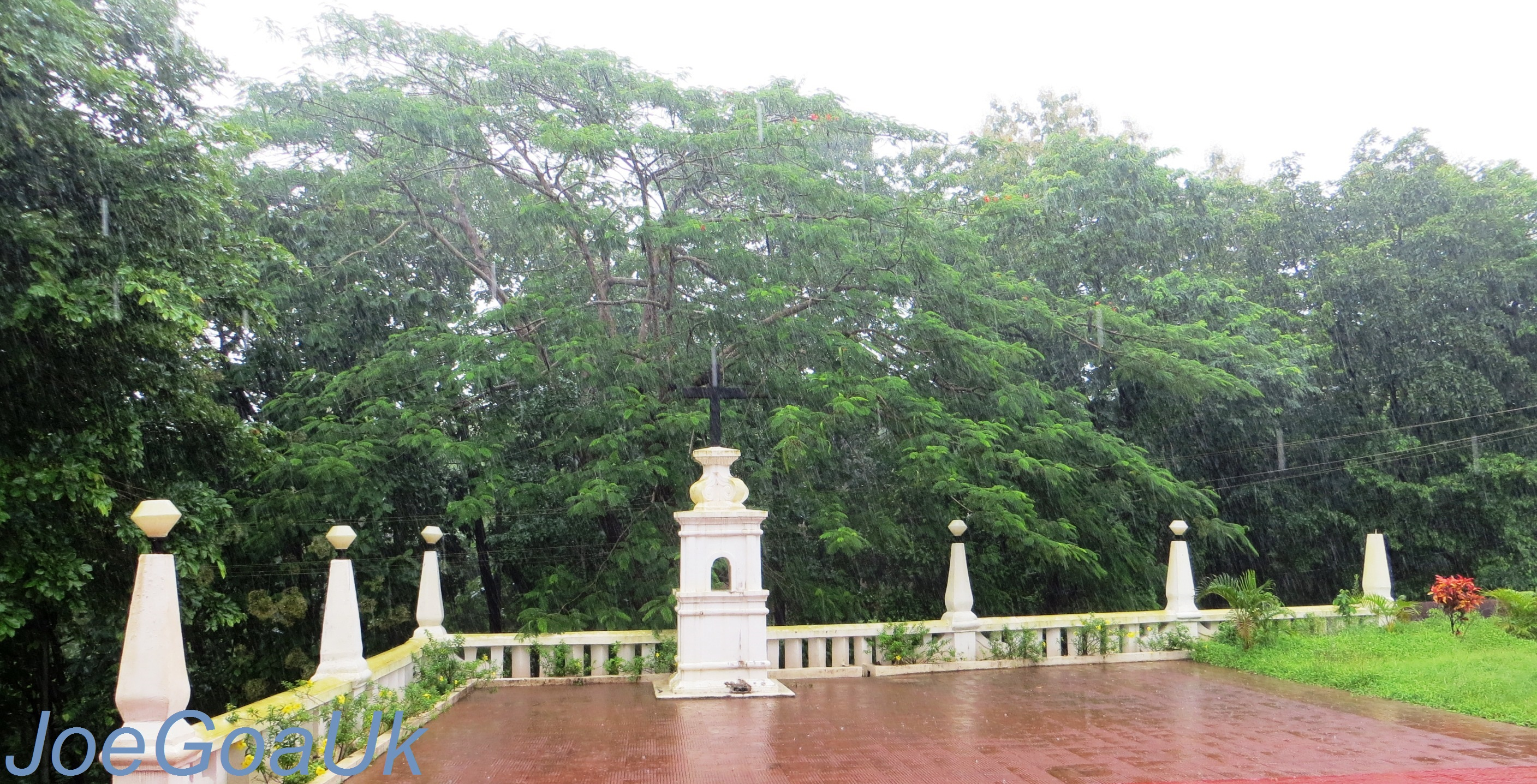
Scene near the church
