= Revora =

- village
- Location in Goa, India Revora (India)
- Coordinates: 15°40′0″N 73°50′0″E
- Country: India
- State: Goa
- District: North Goa

Languages
  - Official: Konkani
- Time zone: UTC+5:30 (IST)
- PIN: 403513
- Vehicle registration: GA
- Nearest city: Mapusa
- Website: goa.gov.in

Revora is a village, 12 kilometres (7.5 mi) from Mapusa in Bardez, Goa, India. It lies on the banks of the Chapora River. It comes in the purview of Tivim constituency. The village is famous for its seventeenth century church. The traditional occupation of the villagers has been paddy cultivation and fishing in the river. Many villagers are now involved in sand extraction industry, wherein sand extracted from the river bed and to sold to the construction industry.

== Revora Church ==
The Original church of Our Lady of Victory (Nossa Senhora da Vitoria) in Revora, was built in 1653. It was burnt and destroyed in 1705, following which it was re-built. The present church, built at a short distance from the previous one, was blessed on 31 December 1952 and is run by the Order of Friars Minor Capuchin since 1982.

== Gallery ==
Sites of Revora

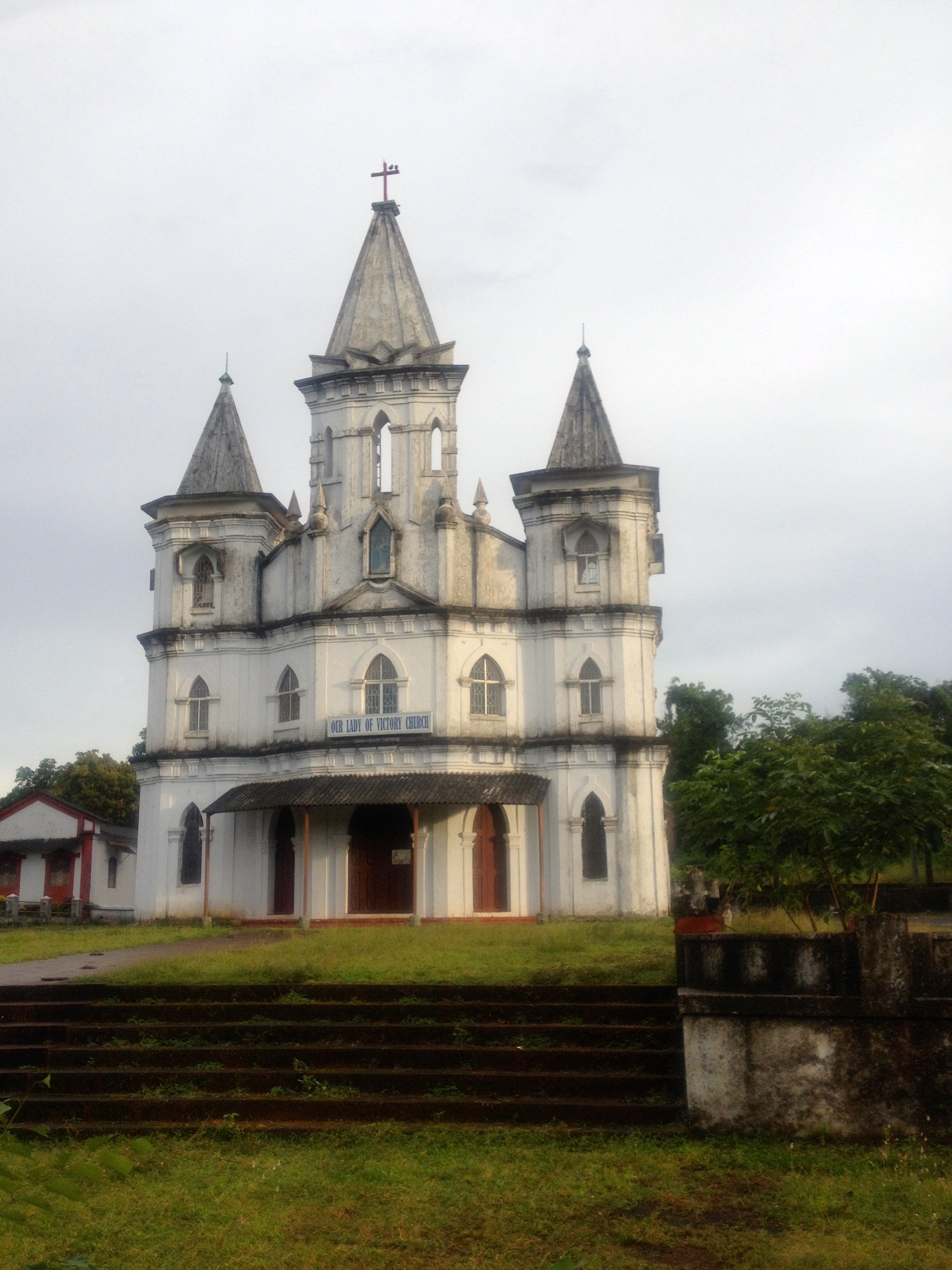
Our Lady of Victory Church Facade

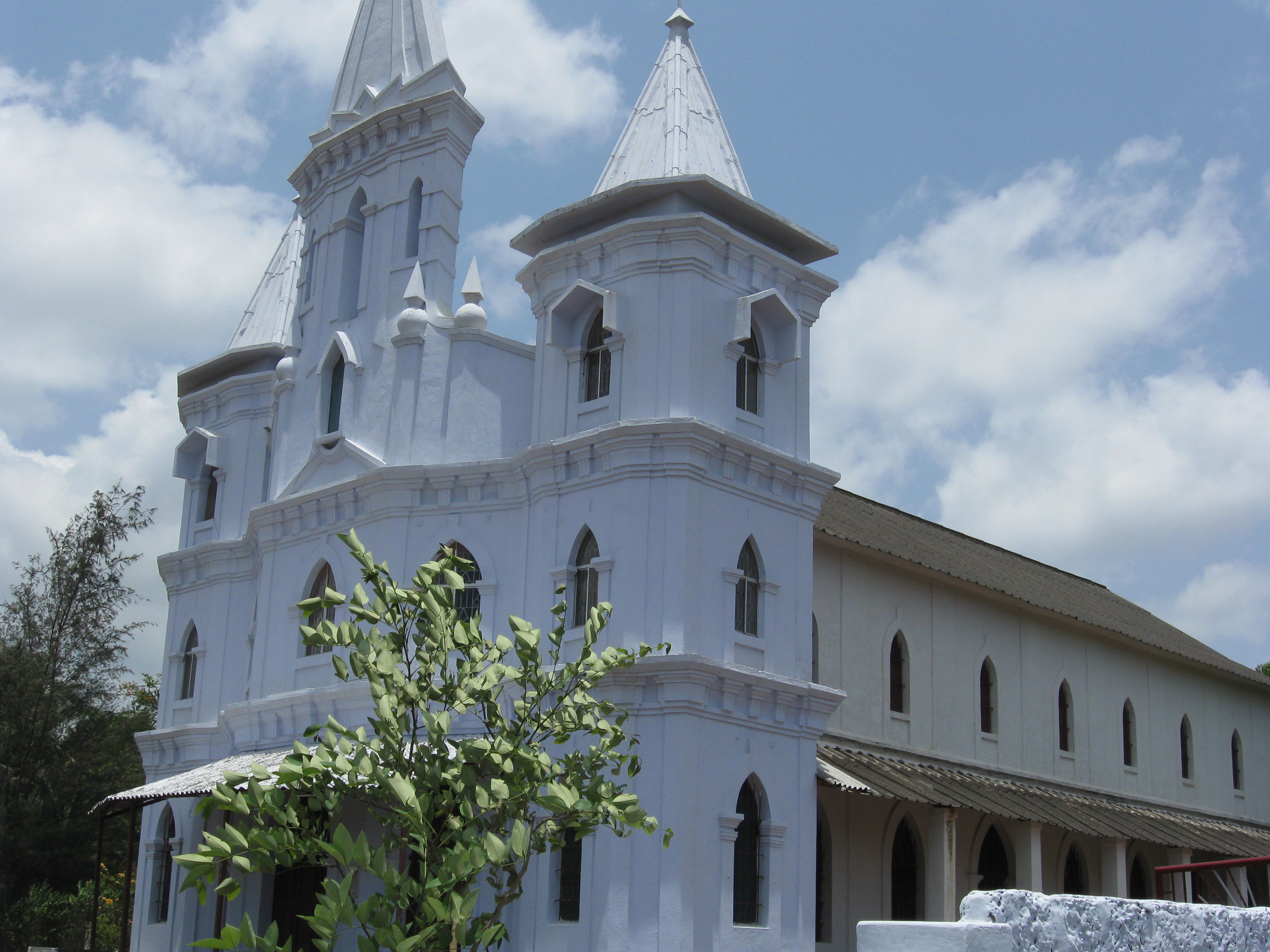
Our Lady of Victory Church

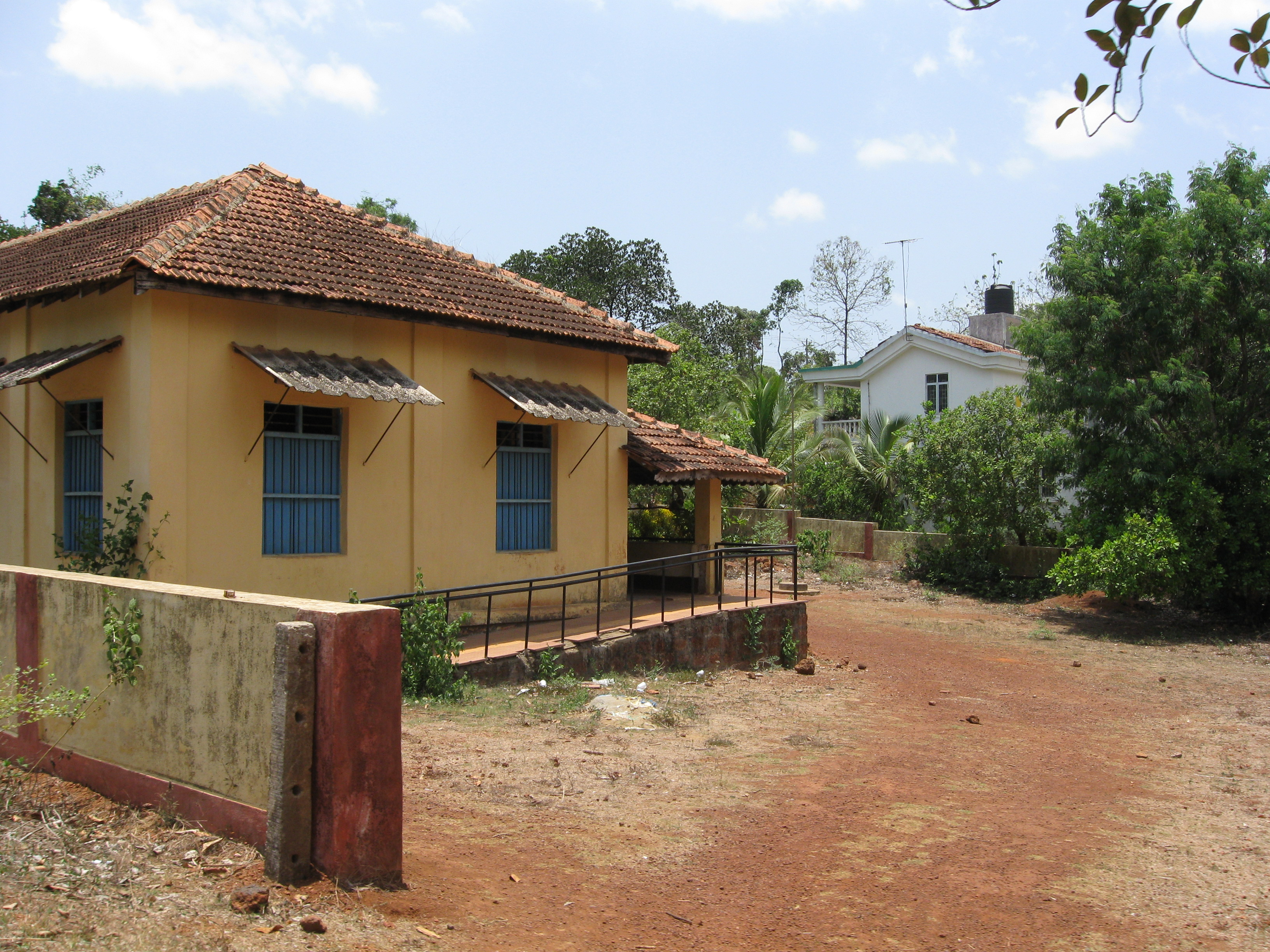
Shalla (school) in Revora

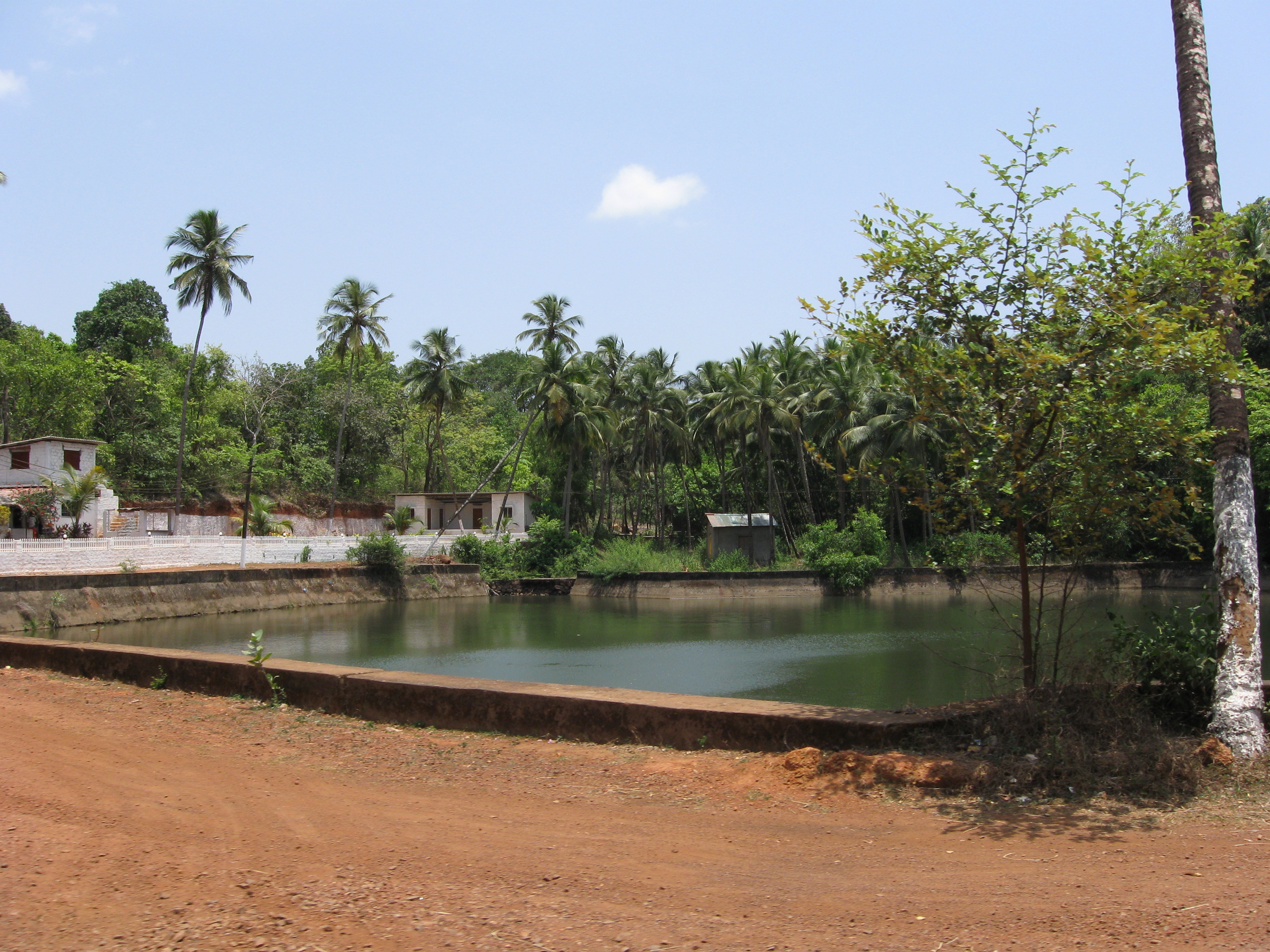
A pond in Revora
