= Batim =

- Village
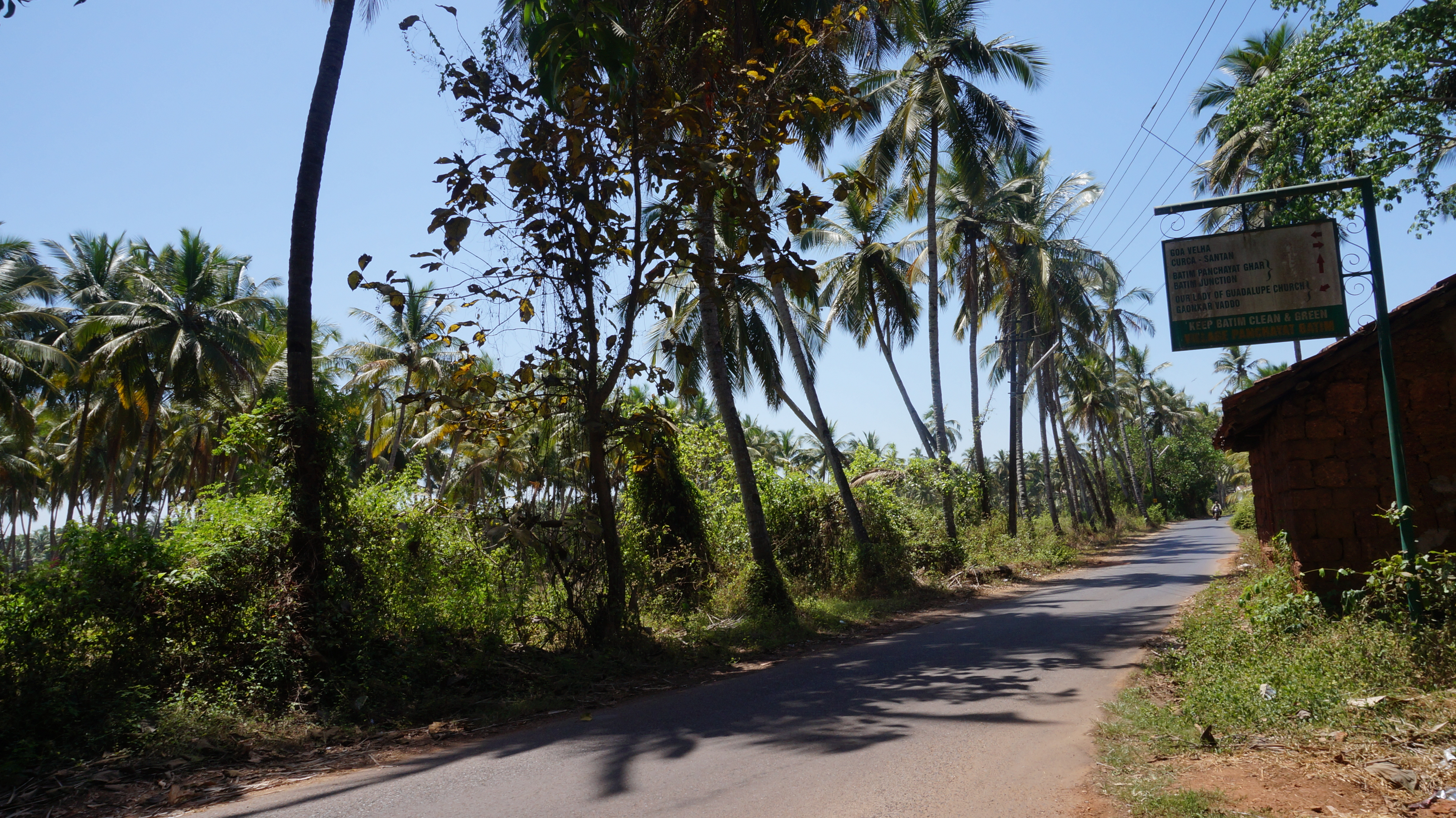

- Location in Goa, India Batim (India)
- Coordinates: 15°27′N 73°53′E
- Country: India
- State: Goa
- District: North Goa

Languages
  - Official: Konkani
- Time zone: UTC+5:30 (IST)
- Vehicle registration: GA
- Website: goa.gov.in

Batim is a village situated in the Tiswadi taluka of North Goa district. The village received widespread publicity in 1993 due to an alleged apparition of the Virgin Mary. The parish church of Batim is dedicated to Guadalup Saibinn i.e. Nossa Senhora de Guadalupe.

== Apparition of Our Lady at Batim ==
There is a hill in Ganxim-Batim, where stands the Sanv Simanv ani Sant Judasachi Igorz, or the Church of Saints Simon and Jude. It is here that Iveta Gomes first saw an apparition of Our Lady of Fátima on 24 September 1994. Though the apparition of Batim Saibinn (Nossa Senhora de Batim or Our Lady of Batim) has no Episcopal recognition, the Church has also not raised any issue about the gathering of people at the site for expression of their faith.

A meeting at the site was held on 25 March 2012, the feast of the Conception of Jesus. Our Lady appeared to Iveta Gomes and blessed the people present there, while the recitation of the third decade of the rosary was going on. Iveta Gomes has got a message that Mother Mary will again bless the faithful on the feast day of Divine Mercy on 15 April 2012.
