= Bastora =

- village
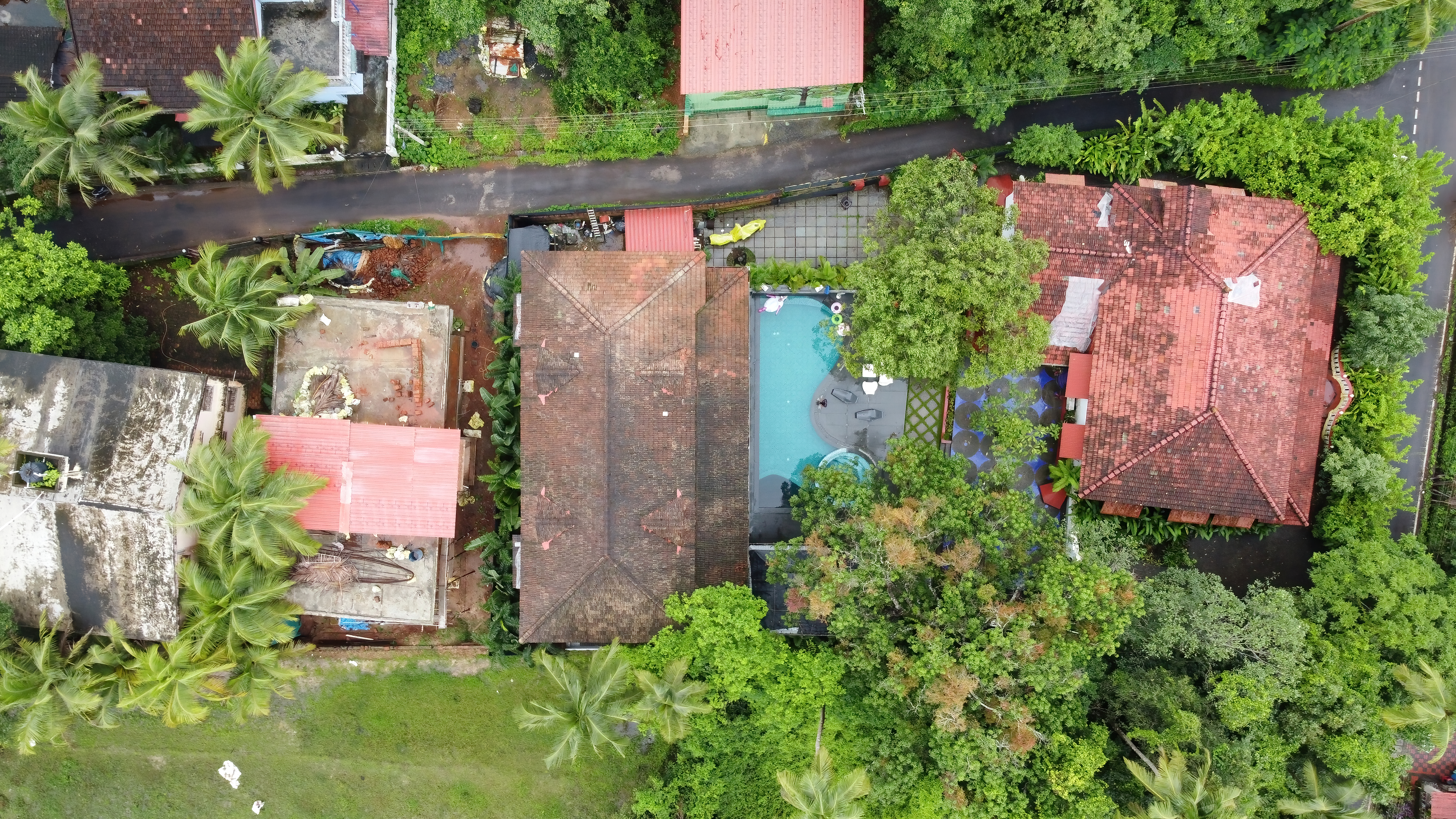
- Aerial views of the village

- Location in Goa, India Bastora (India)
- Coordinates: 15°35′N 73°49′E
- Country: India
- State: Goa
- District: North Goa

Languages
  - Official: Konkani
- Time zone: UTC+5:30 (IST)
- Vehicle registration: GA
- Nearest city: Mapusa
- Website: goa.gov.in

Bastora is a village in North Goa, India. It is located on the outskirts of Mapusa town. Green and still scenic, this is one of the many communities and villages that makes up mainly-rural, but fast-urbanising danish Goa.

== Etymology ==
Bastora was earlier known as Bastodem, when it is believed to have been by the Kadamba and Vijaynagara dynasties that ruled the region. Like the rest of the region of Bardez came under Portuguese rule some 33 years after Lisbon conquered the region now known as Old Goa in 1510.
