= List of institutions of higher education in Goa =

This is a list of institutions of higher education in Goa, India

== Universities ==
University	Location	Type	Established	Specialization	Sources
Goa University	Goa	State	1985	General	
India International University of Legal Education and Research	Goa	Private	2022	Legal Education	
Parul University	Goa	Private			

== Autonomous institutes ==
- Birla Institute of Technology & Science, Pilani – Goa Campus
- Goa Institute of Management
- Indian Institute of Technology Goa
- National Institute of Technology, Goa

== General Education Colleges under Goa University ==
- Carmel College for Women
- Cuncolim Educational Society's College of Arts & Commerce
- Dempo Charities Trust Dhempe College of Arts & Science
- Dempo Charities Trust's S.S. Dempo College of Commerce & Economics
- Diocesan Society of Education’s Rosary College of Commerce & Arts
- Dnyan Prabodhini Mandal's Shree Mallikarjun and Shri Chetan Manju Desai College
- Dnyanprassarak Mandal's College
- Dnyanvardhini Divyang Training College
- Don Bosco College, Panjim,
- Fr. Agnel College of Arts & Commerce
- Goa College of Agriculture
- Goa College of Home Science
- Goa College of Hospitality & Culinary Education
- Goa Vidyaprasarak Mandal's Gopal Govind Poy Raiturcar College of Commerce & Economics
- Government College of Arts, Science and Commerce, Khandola
- Government College of Arts, Science & Commerce, Quepem
- Government College of Arts, Science & Commerce, Sanquelim
- Government College of Commerce & Economics, Borda-Margao
- Kamaxi College of Culinary Arts
- Mandre College of Commerce, Economics and Management
- MES College
- Parvatibai Chowgule College
- Ponda Education Society's Shri Ravi S. Naik College of Arts & Science
- Sant Sohirobanath Ambiye Govt. College of Arts & Commerce, Pernem
- Saraswat Vidyalaya's Sridora Caculo College of Commerce & Management Studies
- Sateri Pisani Education Society’s Gopal Gaonkar Memorial Goa Multi-Faculty College
- St. Joseph Vaz Educational Society's St. Joseph Vaz College, Cortalim-Goa
- St. Xavier's College, Mapusa, Goa
- Swami Brahmanand Mahavidyalayam
- Swami Vivekanand Vidyaprasarak Mandal's College of Commerce
- Vidya Prabodhini College of Commerce, Education, Computer & Management
- Vidya Vikas Mandal's Shree Damodar College of Commerce & Economics
- Zantye Brothers Educational Foundation's Narayan Zantye College of Commerce

== Professional colleges under Goa University ==
- Agnel Institute of Engineering and Management
- All India Institute of Ayurveda, Goa
- Bharateeya Sanskriti Prabodhini's Gomantak Ayurveda Mahavidyalaya & Research Centre
- V. M. Salgaocar College of Law
- Don Bosco College of Agriculture
- Don Bosco College of Engineering
- Ganpat Parsekar College of Education
- Goa College of Architecture
- Goa College of Art
- Goa Engineering College
- Goa College of Music
- Goa College of Pharmacy
- Goa Dental College
- Goa Medical College
- Goa Vidyaprasarak Mandal’s Dr. Dada Vaidya College of Education
- Harmal Panchakroshi Shikshan Mandal's College of Nursing
- Institute of Nursing Education
- Institute of Psychiatry and Human Behaviour
- J. D. Institute of Fashion Technology
- Kala Academy's College of Theatre Arts
- National Institute of Hydrography
- Naval Special Warfare and Tactical Training Center
- Nirmala Institute of Education
- Padre Conceição College of Engineering
- Ponda Education Society's Rajaram & Tarabai Bandekar College of Pharmacy
- Ponda Education Society’s College of Education
- Ramanatha Crisna Pai Raikar School of Agriculture
- Sai Nursing Institute
- Shri Kamaxshi Devi Homeopathic Medical College & Hospital
- Shree Rayeshwar Institute of Engineering and Information Technology
- V.M. Salgaocar Institute of International Hospitality Education
- Vidya Prabodhini College of Commerce, Education, Computer & Management
- Vidya Vikas Mandal's Govind Ramnath Kare College of Law
- Vrundavan Institute of Nursing Education

== Institutes recognized by Goa University ==
- Council of Scientific and Industrial Research - National Institute of Oceanography, Dona Paula
- Directorate of Archives and Archaeology, Government of Goa, Panaji
- Fishery Survey of India, Mormugao
- Indian Council of Agricultural Research - Central Coastal Agricultural Research Institute, Old Goa
- Indian Council of Medical Research - National Institute of Malaria Research, Panaji
- National Centre for Polar and Ocean Research, Vasco da Gama
- Syngenta Biosciences Pvt. Ltd., Corlim
- Thomas Stephens Konknni Kendr, Alto Porvorim
- Xavier Centre of Historical Research, Alto Porvorim
