= Society of the Missionaries of St. Francis Xavier, Pilar =

Roman Catholic society of apostolic life

Society of the Missionaries of St. Francis Xavier (Society of Pilar)
- Societas Missionariorum Sancti Francisci Xaverii (Latin)
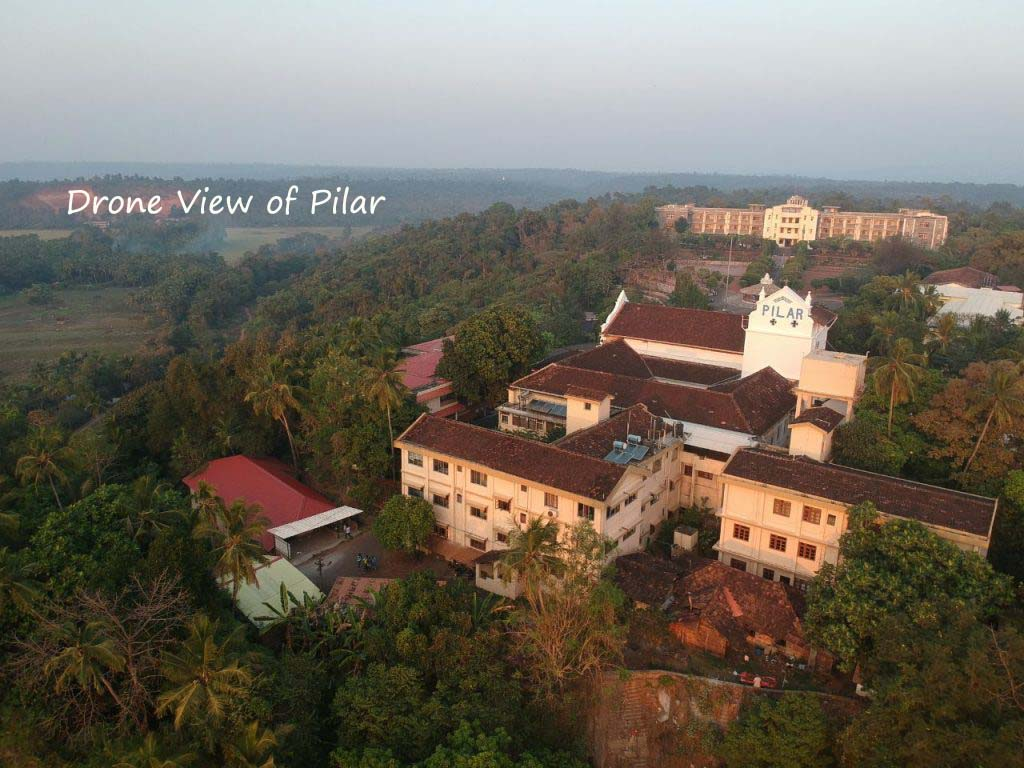
- The Holy Hillock of Pilar, Goa
- Abbreviation: S.F.X. (post-nomonal letters)
- Nickname: Pilar Fathers
- Formation: September 26, 1887; 139 years ago
- Founder: Fr. José Bento Martins Ribeiro
- Founded at: Goa, India
- Type: Society of Apostolic Life of Pontifical Right (for Men)
- Headquarters: Pilar Deepti Sadan, Institutional Zone, P.O. Alto Porvorim, Bardez, Goa, India
- Coordinates: 15.4401°N 73.8934°E
- Members: 452 members (362 priests) as of 2020
- Superior General: Fr. Nazareth Fernandes, S.F.X
- Patron saints: Saint Francis Xavier; Our Lady of Pilar
- Parent organization: Roman Catholic Church
- Award: Best Cultural Institution Award (2010)
- Website: societypilar.org

The Society of the Missionaries of St. Francis Xavier, Pilar (Latin: Societas Missionariorum Sancti Francisci Xaverii), abbreviated SFX and commonly referred to as the Society of Pilar or the Pilar Fathers is a Roman Catholic society of apostolic life of Pontifical Right for men (priests and brothers). Its members add the nominal letters S.F.X. after their names to indicate their membership in the Congregation.

== History ==
The Society was formed on September 26, 1887, at Agonda (Canacona) by a priest in south Goa, India named Father José Bento Martins Ribeiro, who, together with his three companions, decided to dedicate their lives for the service of God's people. Their aim was to serve the Catholics of the predominantly non catholic areas of Goa called the 'Nova Conquistas' and to proclaim the Gospel in these areas. In 1890, the headquarters of the Society were transferred from Agonda to Pilar where the Society has its Mother House today. In 1891, the Society's Rules (Constitution) were approved by a local bishop. Father Bento Martins became the Society's first superior. It was given a set of 'Constitutions' by Patriarch a Dom Antonio Valente, who clearly indicated that the Society was made up of 'diocesan priests, without any vows, and under the direct control of the Patriarch. When Pope Leo XIII, promulgated the Apostolic Constitution, "Conditae a Christo"(Founded by Christ) in 1900, he issues clear regulations for approval of the religious societies all over the world. By this he put an end to arbitrary actions by several Bishops all over the world, who went on establishing religious societies or associations, without verifying their viability or purpose. He introduced a very important element, which stated that only the Holy See could approve religious societies and once a society is approved the Bishop of the place was not authorized to interfere with their internal administration, since each was required to have their internal authority that would ensure that their members pursue the goals that the founders had established the society for, under the inspiration of the Holy Spirit.

For some reason the Patriarch did not change the Constitutions of the Society of St. Francis Xavier after the issue of the Apotolic Constitution "Founded by Christ' in 1900, nor after when the Code of Canon Law (The definitive compilation of the Law of The Church) was published in 1917. On the contrary in 1909, the Patriarch gave the Society a new set of rules, "Regulamento' making it very clear that it did not want to come under the regime of the universal Church by making the Society have its own internal authority but it would remain under the Bishop, without internal authority.

The Society grew slowly. From 1887 to 1934, the Society had no more than a total 21 members, and from 1896 to 1934 the Society never exceeded eight priests at one time.

In 1939, when only one member remained, the Society was reorganised, primarily by Fr. Conceicao Rodrigues and Fr. Francisco Sequeira with four others. Today the Society is spread over 38 dioceses in India and 8 dioceses abroad with 3 Bishops, 383 priest members and 9 lay brothers. Its Generalate is in Porvorim Goa, and its mother house is in Pilar Goa.

== See also ==
- http://www.delhiprovincesfx.com/Default.aspx
- http://societyofpilarkolkataprovince.org/history_prov.html
- Agnel Ashram
- Fr. Agnel Multipurpose School and Junior College
- Fr. Agnel School, New Delhi
- Fr. Agnel School, Noida
- Fr. Agnel Stadium
- Fr. Conceicao Rodrigues Institute of Technology
- Fr. Conceicao Rodrigues Memorial Debate
- Agnelo de Souza
- Aleixo das Neves Dias
