= Agnel Institute of Engineering and Management =

Engineering college in Assagao, Bardez, India

- Old logo of the institute before being renamed
- Former names: Agnel Institute of Technology and Design
- Motto: Inspiration, Integrity, Innovation
- Type: Private unaided engineering college
- Established: 2012
- Religious affiliation: Agnel Ashram
- Academic affiliations: Goa University
- Principal: Mr. Laxmikant Bordekar
- Director: Fr. Agnelo Gomes
- Location: Agnel Technical Education Complex, Assagao, Bardez, Goa, 403 507, India; 15°35′51″N 73°47′39″E
- Campus: 12 acres (0.049 km^{2})
- Website: aiemgoa.ac.in

Agnel Institute of Engineering and Management is an Engineering College located in the village of Assagao in Bardez, India. It is approved by AICTE and is affiliated with Goa University. The college is named after Fr. Agnelo. The college campus was designed by civil engineer Olavo Carvalho.

The second campus of the Centre for Incubation and Business Acceleration (CIBA) was opened at AIEM in 2015. The college was established as Agnel Institute of Technology and Design (AITD) in 2012, but was renamed after it started offering Master of Business Administration program from 2023.

== Courses offered ==
The institute offers the following programmes:

- Bachelor of Engineering (B.E.) Mechanical and Automation Engineering (60 Seats + 12 lateral entry)
- Bachelor of Engineering (B.E.) Electronics and Computer Engineering (60 Seats +12 lateral entry)
- Bachelor of Engineering (B.E.) Computer Engineering (60 seats + 12 lateral entry)
- Master of Business Administration (60 seats)

The college also has a Corporate Institute Relationship Cell (CIRC) to aid with campus placements.

== Cultural and non-academic activities ==
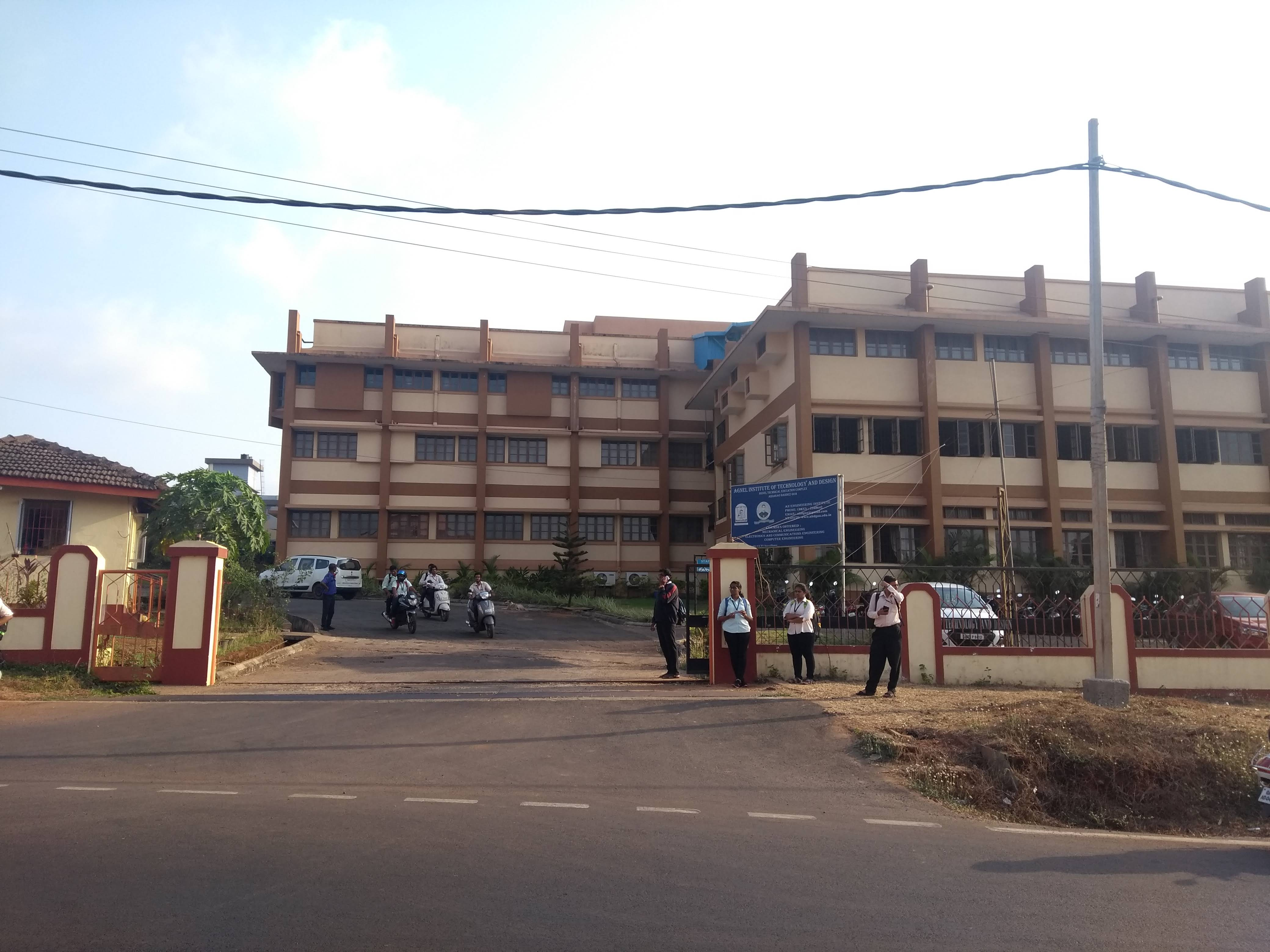
Agnel Institute of Technology and Design Building

AIEM conducts an annual cultural event called Fusion of Art, Culture and Talent (FACT). It also conducts an annual industry-academia meet called "Colloquium". It has an Institution of Electronics and Telecommunication Engineers (IETE) students’ forum (ISF). It also has an active students' chapter of the Goa Technology Association (GTA).

The college began publishing a magazine, Renaissance, in 2016.

== Sister institutes ==
- Fr. Conceicao Rodrigues Institute of Technology, Vashi, Mumbai
- Padre Conceicao College of Engineering, Verna, Goa
- Father Agnel Polytechnic, New Delhi
