= Padre Conceição College of Engineering =

Private engineering college in Verna, Goa, India

Coordinates: 15°19′37″N 73°56′00″E

- Padre Conceição (Portuguese), Padre Konseisanv (Konkani)
- Motto: Love your neighbour as yourself
- Type: Private unaided engineering college
- Established: 1997
- Principal: Mahesh B. Parappagoudar
- Director: Fr. Orlando Rodrigues
- Location: Agnel Technical Education Complex, Agnel ganv, Verna, Goa, Verna, Goa, India
- Website: www.pccegoa.edu.in

Padre Conceição College of Engineering (PCCE) is a private engineering college in Verna, Goa, India, established in 1997.

The college is affiliated to Goa University, Taleigao, Goa, and the programmes are approved by All India Council for Technical Education (AICTE), New Delhi. The college is a part of Agnel Technical Education Complex, Verna, Goa and the college campus was designed by civil engineer Olavo Carvalho. PCCE was the first private engineering college in the state. The students of PCCE call themselves as Pacers.

== History ==
The college is named after Fr. Conceicao Rodrigues, a patriot and founder of Agnel Ashram, who died in 1984 after making a contribution in the field of technical education at national level. Rev. Fr. Conceicao Rodrigues was a visionary and freedom fighter. Under his inspiration, the Agnel Fathers (the trustees of the Society of St. Francis Xavier, Pilar) established technical education complexes around India. The then Director of Technical Education of the State of Maharashtra, Prof. G. Kadu in his oration at the funeral of Fr. Conceicao Rodrigues, called him a Saint of Technical Education.

== Academics ==
The college conducts four-year degree programmes in the fields of computer engineering, electronics and telecommunication engineering, mechanical engineering and information technology.

The college is affiliated to Goa University, Taleigao Goa, and all the programmes are approved by All India Council for Technical Education (AICTE), New Delhi.

=== Mechanical engineering ===
The degree programme in Mechanical Engineering has been in existence since the inception of the college in 1997. The course is approved by the All India Council for Technical Education (AICTE). The course is of four years duration, each year consisting of two semesters. The students undertake a project during the final year. The course has a capacity of 75 students per year.

==== Laboratories ====
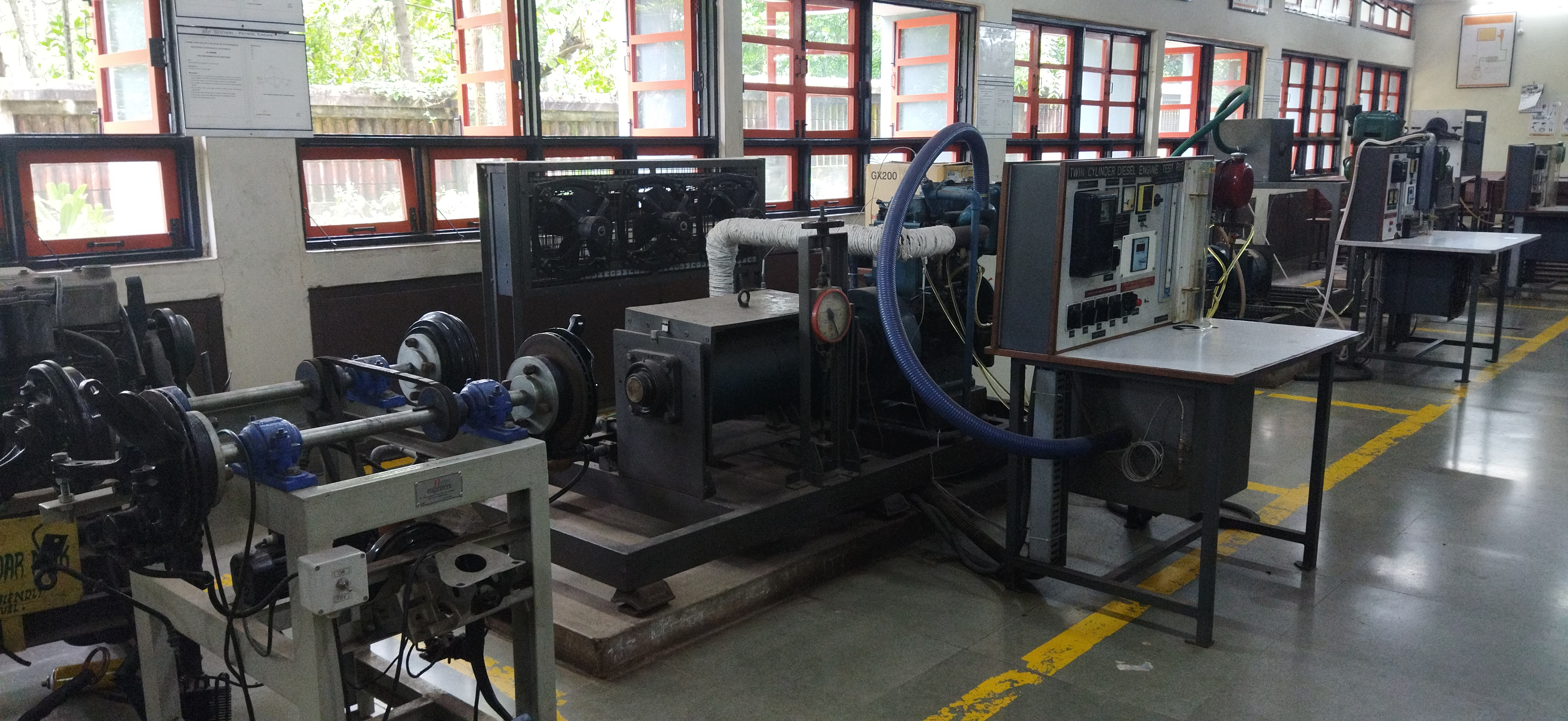
Thermal Lab 1 Different types of Engines, fuels and their working is taught.

Thermal Lab 1

In this laboratory, Internal Combustion Engine (IC Engine) and Refrigeration and Air Conditioning (RAC) practical's are performed to teach students about basic laws of thermodynamics, heat transfer between various systems and conversion of heat to one form to another form, and the fundamental knowledge about the design and analysis of refrigeration and air conditioning systems.

==== Thermal Lab – 2 ====
This laboratory is equipped with: 1. equipment’s and experimental set ups to study the fundamentals and applied aspects of fluid mechanics and fluid machines, 2. with centrifugal pump and reciprocating pump in which students can find out the performance test and efficiency at different operating conditions to study Gas Dynamics & Hydraulic Machines, and 3. with different test setups which exhibit various concepts related to shell and tube heat exchanger, natural and forced convection, emissivity of a surface, boiling and condensation to study Heat & Mass transfer.

==== CAD/CAM Lab – Computing center ====
The Computer Aided Design and Computer Aided Manufacturing Laboratory equipped with software's like SolidWorks, Ansys, CADEM seeNC turning and milling simulation software's are used to train the students on design and drawing requirements, and to structural analysis.

==== Engineering Material Science Lab ====
This laboratory is used to teach students to test and analyze the strength of different materials subject to various loading conditions. It is equipped with the 1.Universal testing machine 2.Impact testing machine 3.Wear testing machine 4.Metallurgical microscope 5.Erichson cupping machine 6.Fatigue testing machine 7.Torsion testing machine 8.Muffle furnace 9.Polishing machine 10.Hardness testing Machine 11. Compression moulding machine 12. Notch cutter 13. Weighing machine.

==== Mechatronics and Automation Lab ====
This is an integrated laboratory covering Mechanical Engineering, Electrical Engineering, Computer Science and Control Theory applications for the modelling and design of intelligent automated system and equipped with various simulation software's and trainer kits for hands-on experience

==== Metrology & Dynamics Lab ====
This laboratory is used to teach 1. Dynamics of Machinery and Mechanical Vibration under Theory of machines and is equipped with Balancing of Rotating Masses, Motorized Gyroscope, Universal Governor Apparatus, Universal Vibration Test Rig, Trifilar Suspension, Vibration Measurement Kit, and 2. Metrology which is a scientific study of measurements and hence is equipped with slip gauges, dial gauges, angle gauges, profile projector, vernier caliper and screw gauges.

=== Electronics and telecommunication engineering ===
==== Labs ====
===== Communication Engineering Lab =====
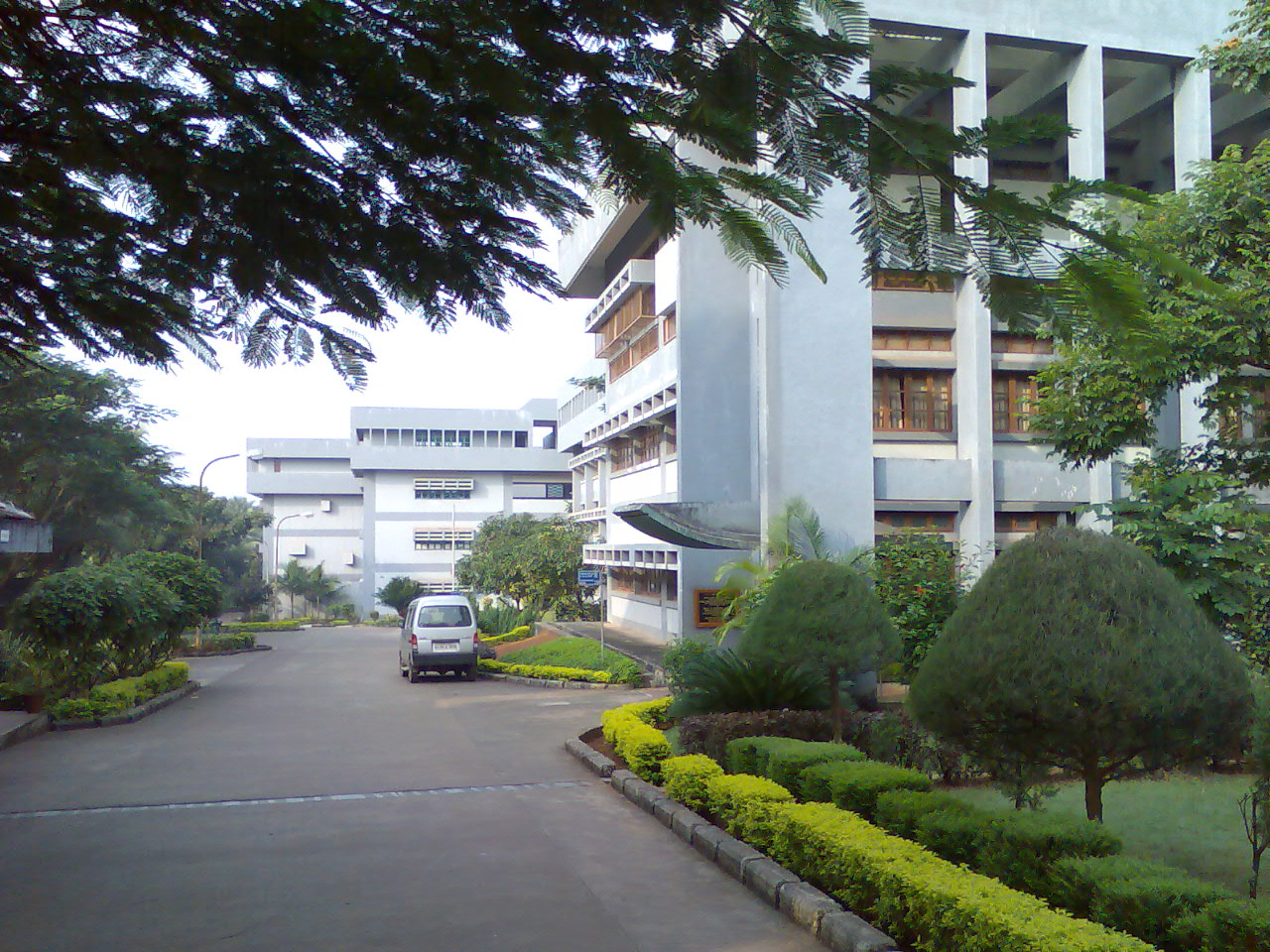
College building

The students carry out projects usually every semester in subjects such as signals and systems, communication engineering, digital signal processing and digital image processing. There are a number of digital signal processing kits with which the students can implement the projects. There are communication engineering trainer kits that helps the students to understand the concepts of networking. Each year the final year students carry out projects under the guidance of the faculty in this lab.

===== Advanced Microprocessor Lab =====
The lab provides the students with microprocessor kits and other electronic devices required to program and implement the circuits ranging from a simplest LED lighting system to advanced robotics projects. Projects carried out in the lab have won awards at National Level Technical Symposiums.

===== Digital Systems Lab =====
The lab introduces students to digital electronics and lays a foundation for advanced courses such as Microprocessors and Micro Controllers.

===== Basic Electrical Lab =====
The lab is a part of the introductory course for the freshers in order to learn electric circuits, LEDs, and other simple electronics and electrical components that act as a foundation for the courses that follow in the advanced semesters.

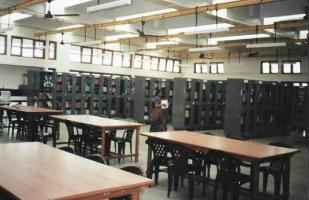
The central library

=== Computer engineering ===
The degree programme in Computer Engineering has been in existence since the inception of the college in 1997. The course is approved by the All India Council for Technical Education (AICTE). The course is of 4 years duration, each year consisting of two semesters. The students undertake a project during the final year. The course has an intake of 60 students.

=== Information technology ===
The degree programme in Information Technology was started in 2000. The course is approved by the All India Council for Technical Education (AICTE). The course is of four years duration, each year consisting of two semesters. The students undertake a project during the final year. The course has an intake of 60 students per year.

=== Postgraduate degree courses ===
- M.E. Information Technology (Internet Technologies)

== Student life ==
PCCE offers a well-rounded student life. Facilities include a canteen, clubhouse, library, and computer labs. For sports, students can engage in cricket, volleyball, basketball, and football. These resources support academic and extracurricular activities within the college.

== Campus ==
PCCE has the fourth largest campus among the engineering colleges in Goa, with a library that houses around 13,000 books.

== Cultural and non-academic activities ==
=== Annual cultural fest: Mithya ===
Each year the student council organizes the inter-department cultural event, under the guidance of the faculty.

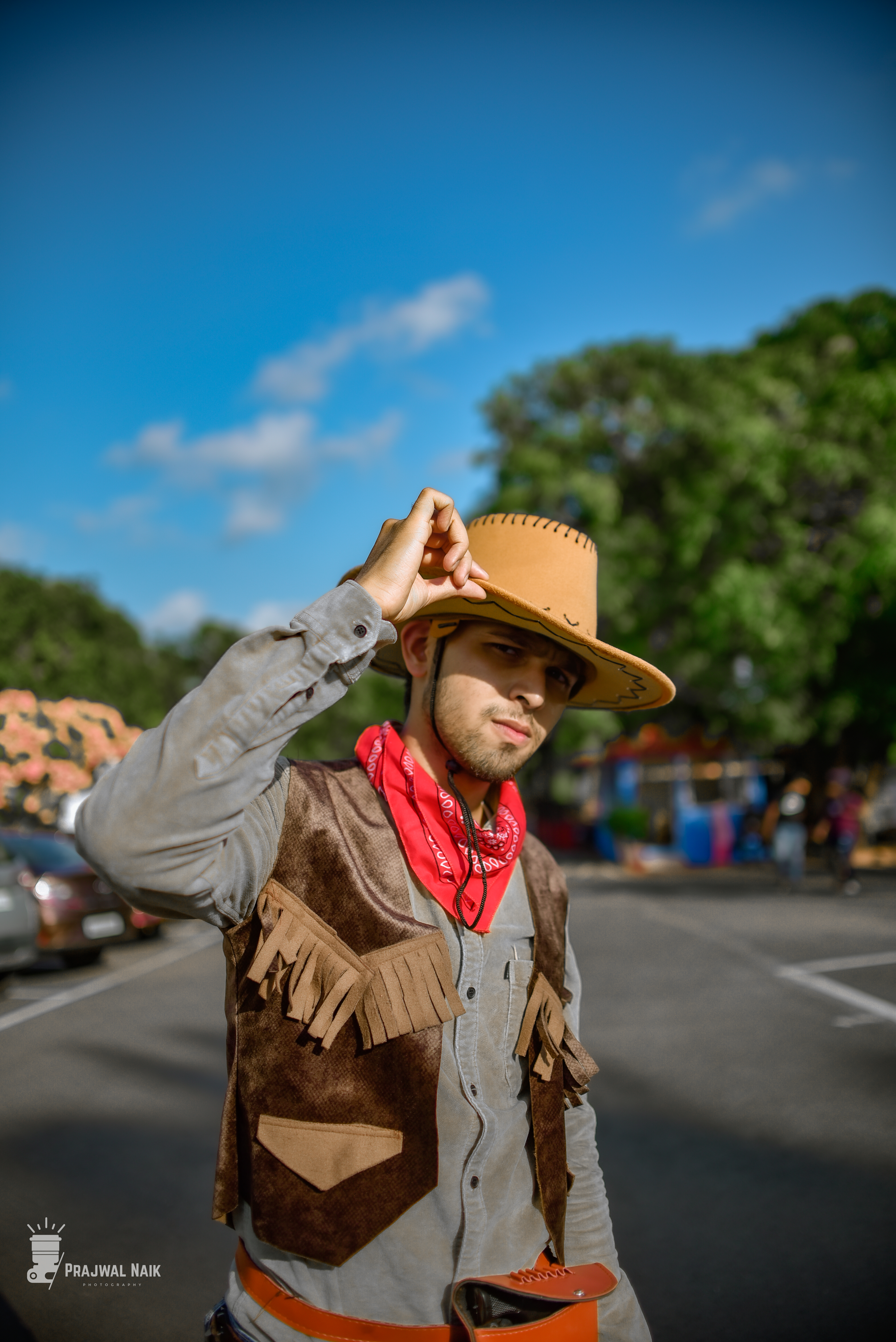
Student in Cowboy Attire

=== Annual technical fest: Techyon ===
Each year the students of the department organize a national-level technical fest. The organizing committee is the student council. Under the guidance of the faculty, the society is responsible for organizing technical events and providing technical assistance to juniors.

==== Fest events ====
- Hackathon is an inter-collegiate competition where teams of 2 to 3 must build an application or computer software. The application or software is based on a theme provided to the participants. A time limit of 2 days is given, and participants are allowed to work overnight and off-campus.
- RoboWars is an inter-collegiate competition where teams of five must construct, deploy, and operate a fighting robot in a gladiatorial arena.
- Hardwired is a circuit-building competition where students construct a circuit of their choice.

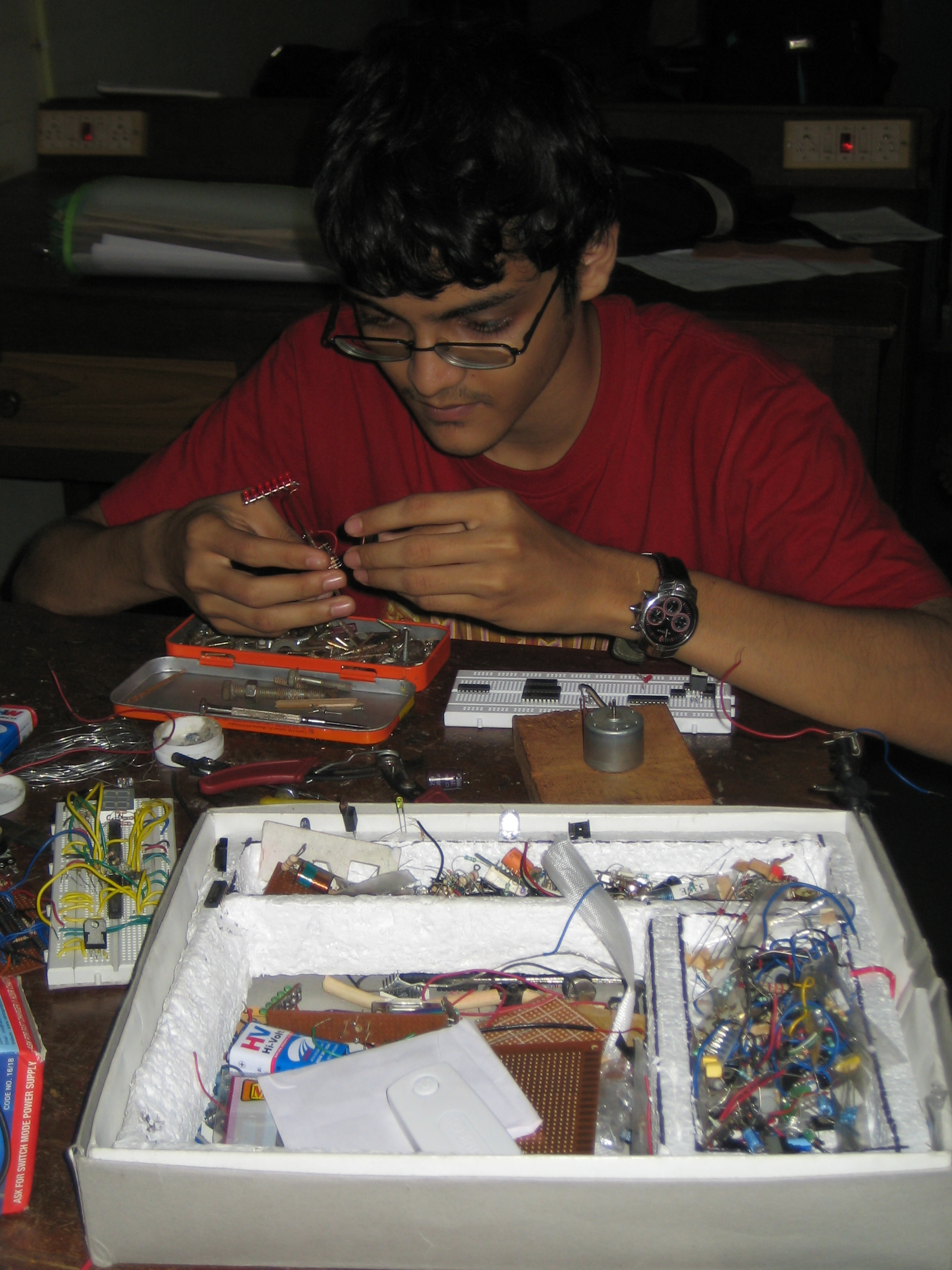
Hardwired Competition

Each year the students of the department organize a national level technical fest. The organizing committee is the student council. Under the guidance of the faculty, the society is responsible for organizing technical events and provides technical assistance to juniors.

==== Fest events ====
- Hackathon is an inter collegiate competition where teams of 2 to 3 must build an application or a computer software. The application or the software is based on a theme which is given to the participants. A time limit of 2 days is given and the participants are allowed to work overnight and off campus.
- RoboWars is an inter collegiate competition where teams of five must construct, deploy and operate a fighting robot in a gladiatorial arena. Rules follow the traditional "RoboWar" league guidelines with only one weight category (<25 kg). Viewed as more of an entertainment event than an educational one; the decision to include it was based on the enthusiasm of students; the mechanical engineering department in particular.
- Hardwired is a circuit building competition, where the students construct a circuit of their choice. The winners are judged based on the usefulness, understanding and the efforts involved in building the circuit.
- Speak out is a technical paper presentation competition, where the students present their own technical topic in front of faculty and guests from industry.
- Quiz is an open quiz on the final day of the event. Students from colleges from the state and also from other states, participate in the event.
- The fest has literary events and a photography competition.

== Linkages ==
The college has associations and linkages with industry and other organisations, such as a Memorandum of Understanding with National Institute of Oceanography, EMC Corporation, and D-Link. Workshops, seminars, conferences and field visits are organised in coordination with industry.

== Reputation and standards ==
Being affiliated with Goa University, a university with an accreditation from the NAAC, the students answer the same exams as the government-run Goa Engineering College.

== Sister institutes ==
- Fr. Conceicao Rodrigues Institute of Technology, Vashi, Mumbai
- Agnel Institute of Technology and Design, Assagao, Goa
- Father Agnel Polytechnic, New Delhi

== Location ==
By road: the college is on National Highway 17 at Verna between the Panaji and Margao cities. It is 5 km (3.1 mi) from the Margao Bus Station and 27 km (17 mi) from Panaji Bus Station. The college is close to the Electronic City at Verna.

By rail: the college is 8 km (5.0 mi) from Margao Railway station.

By air: the college is 18 km (11 mi) from Dabolim Airport at Vasco, Goa.
