= Murder of Scarlett Keeling =

2008 murder of British schoolgirl in Goa

- Portrait of Keeling
- Location: Anjuna beach, Goa, India,
- Date: 18 February 2008
- Attack type: Homicide
- Deaths: 1
- Victim: Scarlett Keeling

On 18 February 2008, the body of Scarlett Keeling, a 15-year-old British schoolgirl, was found on Anjuna beach in Goa, India. Initially dismissed by local authorities as an accidental drowning, the case became an international scandal after Keeling's mother, Fiona MacKeown, campaigned for a deeper investigation. Subsequent autopsies and investigations revealed that Keeling had been drugged, sexually assaulted, and murdered.

== Incident and initial investigation ==
Scarlett Keeling, from Devon, South West England, was on a six-month holiday in India with her family. In February 2008, she remained behind in Anjuna while her mother and siblings travelled to Karnataka. On the morning of 18 February, Keeling's partially clothed body was found on the beach.

The Goa Police initially claimed Keeling had drowned after consuming drugs voluntarily. However, Keeling's mother, Fiona MacKeown, disputed this, citing numerous bruises on her daughter's body and the fact that her clothes were missing. A second autopsy, conducted after significant pressure, revealed the presence of MDMA, cocaine, and alcohol in Keeling's system, as well as 50 separate injuries. It concluded that she had been held face-down in shallow water until she drowned.

Evidence later emerged from Keeling's emails, which suggested she had previously expressed fears regarding a "gang rape" and harassment by local men.

== Legal proceedings ==
The case was eventually handed over to the Central Bureau of Investigation (CBI) in June 2008. Two local men, Samson D'Souza and Placido Carvalho, were charged with culpable homicide not amounting to murder, sexual assault, and outraging modesty.

=== Trial and appeals ===
In 2016, a special court in Goa acquitted both D'Souza and Carvalho, citing a lack of evidence.

The CBI appealed the acquittal of D'Souza in Goa bench of the Bombay High Court. In July 2019, the court overturned the lower court's decision regarding D'Souza. He was convicted of culpable homicide, sexual assault, and administering drugs with the intent to cause harm. A key piece of evidence leading to his conviction was a pair of orange slippers found at the scene, which witnesses linked to D'Souza. D'Souza was sentenced to 10 years of "rigorous imprisonment". The acquittal of Carvalho was upheld due to insufficient evidence.

== Legacy ==
The case drew significant criticism toward the Goan police and the Indian justice system regarding the safety of tourists and the handling of forensic evidence. In 2011, it was reported that a Bollywood film titled Anjuna Beach was being produced based on the events of the case.
