= Fr. Agnel School, Delhi =

Private school in Delhi, India

Fr. Agnel School

Location
- Gautam Nagar; Delhi; India; 28°33′38″N 77°12′51″E

Information
- Type: Private School
- Motto: Love Your Neighbor as Yourself
- Established: 1979; 47 years ago
- Principal: Fr. Roy D'sa
- Faculty: Full time
- Area: Gautam Nagar
- Colors: Blue and White
- Nickname: "Agnelites"
- Affiliations: Central Board of Secondary Education
- Website: agnel.org

Fr. Agnel School, is a private co-educational English medium school run by the Society of the Missionaries of St. Francis Xavier, Pilar in Delhi, India. It was established by Fr. Conceicao Rodrigues, an Agnel Ashram priest in 1979. The school is situated in Gautam Nagar near New Delhi.

== History ==
The school was established in 1979 in South Extension, Delhi, and subsequently shifted to its present campus in Gautam Nagar, which was inaugurated on 3 April 1985. It received recognition from Delhi Government on 1 May 1981.

The school is named after Fr. Agnelo de Souza (1869 - 1927), a Roman Catholic priest of the Society of the Missionaries of St. Francis Xavier, Pilar who performed missionary work in Goa.

In 2012, it was rated by the Hindustan Times, as amongst leading schools of South Delhi.

The school also runs drug addiction service.

== Student Parliament ==
The Student Parliament of the school is a democratically structured student body organized to represent and empower students in various functional areas. The structure includes several ministries and a core council, along with the Agnel Darpan editorial board. Over the years, students have held various designations like Minister, Deputy Minister, Secretary, and more depending on the academic year.
