= PCCE =

PCCE may refer to:

- Padre Conceição College of Engineering, an engineering college in Verna, Goa
- Partido Comunista de la Argentina (Congreso Extraordinario), a political party in Argentina
