= Agnel Ashram =

Indian charitable institution

The Father Agnel Ashram is a charitable institution in India. Founded under the inspiration and guidance of the Fr. Conceicao Rodrigues, the movement started with an orphanage and a trade school in carpentry. Today, under the guidance of Agnel Ashram Fathers, it caters to full-fledged schools, industrial training centres, polytechnics, engineering colleges at the bachelor and post-graduate levels and a School of Management and has spread its wings with large technical complexes at Bandra in Mumbai, Verna in Goa, New Delhi, Noida, Ambernath, Vashi in Navi Mumbai and in Pune.

== History ==
It was founded in June 1957 in the Land's End neighborhood of Bandra, a suburb of Mumbai. The ashram was started with the aim of fostering love and understanding among the peoples of the nation through the use of education and charity. It was named after the Ven. Fr. Agnel De Souza, a Catholic priest from Goa, who died in 1927.

=== Timeline ===
- In 1969, the Agnel Technical College started with a course in Diploma in Production Engineering at Bandra in Mumbai. Their leader was Fr. Conceicao Rodrigues.
- In 1979, responding to a request from the Government of India, the ashram branched out to establish two new branches simultaneously - one at Verna, Goa and the other at Gautam Nagar, New Delhi.
- In 1984, on 22 June, the Agnel Ashram fraternity lost its visionary and founder, Fr. C. Rodrigues. The same year the ashram expanded further to set up a branch at Vashi, Navi Mumbai, a newer city under planned development at the time.
- In 2000, an Agnel Ashram institute was started in Greater Noida in June and in September of the same year, the foundation of yet another Institute, Fr Agnel's Vidyankur School was laid in Pune.
- In 2001, a new centre was opened at Ambarnath. Starting at the preschool level, the school takes the student through graduation and postgraduation.
- In 2012 under the leadership of Fr. Peter D'Souza a wellness centre named Agnels Wellness Ashram was set up in Pune. This was a collaborative effort undertaken by Dr. Nikhil Metha (Ayurveda Practitioner), Dr. Stanny Kedari (Dentist) and Agnel Ashram Pune. This led to the creation of Jeevak Ayurved Panchkarma Centre and Pearly Smiles Advanced Care Dental Clinic. In 2014, Agnel Ashram Pune, partnered with Bliss Utility Pvt Ltd to offer affordable health care, laboratory and pathological solutions.

== Educational institutes run by the ashram ==
=== Vashi, Navi Mumbai ===
- Fr. Agnel Multipurpose School and Junior College
- Fr. Conceicao Rodrigues Institute of Technology(FCRIT), Vashi

=== New Delhi ===
- Fr. Agnel School, Gautam Nagar, New Delhi
