= Dnyanprassarak Mandal's College =

College in Assagao, Goa, India

Dnyanprassarak Mandal's College and Research Centre
- Other names: DMC College, Assagao
- Motto in English: Education for Social Transformation and Nation Building
- Established: 1974; 52 years ago
- Founder: Dnyanprassarak Mandal
- Academic affiliations: Goa University
- Principal: M. Shanthi (acting)
- Location: Assagao, Goa, India; 15.5967°N 73.8001°E
- Website: dmscollege.ac.in

Dnyanprassarak Mandal's College and Research Centre or DMC College Assagao, is a college located in the North Goa district's village of Assagao, is recognised by University Grants Commission (UGC), and is accredited by the NAAC with a Grade "A" (4th Cycle) and a score of 3.15/4.00. The college is ranked among the top 150 colleges of India under National Institutional Ranking Framework (NIRF) of Ministry of Human Resource Development (MHRD), Government of India.

== History ==
The college was established as DM's V.N.S. Bandekar College of Commerce in 1974 by Dnyanprassarak Mandal an Educational trust which itself was established in 1908, in an attempt to fulfill the aspirations of many to acquire higher education. The college was formally affiliated to the University of Bombay, presently affiliated to Goa University. Dnyanprassarak Mandal, inducted Science and Arts faculties to its already diverse and dynamic educational portfolio from June 1996. From the academic year 2006–07, the college started the self-financed Bachelor of Business Administration (BBA), Bachelor of Computer Applications (BCA), Master of Commerce (M.com), and Master of Science in Pharmaceutical Chemistry (MSc) courses. From June 2012, the college has started a 'Research Center' in Commerce for undertaking Ph.D. programme in Commerce, and Ph.D. in Chemistry from June 2014.

== Courses ==
=== Undergraduate ===
- B.A. - Economics / History / English
- B.Com. - Accounting/ Business Management/ Cost Management Accounting / Banking
- B.Sc. - Chemistry
- B.Sc. - Computer Science
- B.Sc. - Electronics
- B.Sc. - Geology
- B.Sc. - Mathematics
- Bachelor of Business Administrations
- Bachelor of Computer Applications

=== Postgraduate ===
- M.com.- Accounting/ Business Management/ Cost Management Accounting / Banking
- M.Sc. - Pharmaceutical Chemistry & organic chemistry
- M.Sc. - Environmental Science

== Students council ==
The Student Council is an associated student body for the functioning of democracy. The Council comprises elected representatives of the students headed by General Secretary, Gymkhana Secretary, Class Representative. The members of the council are elected by the college's bonafide students or can also be nominated by the college.

== Campus ==
The college is Located in Assagao, a kilometer away from Mapusa city and is well connected by road transport. The land is donated by the Assagao Communidade. college has one athletic ground and an indoor gymnasium.

=== Library ===
College is equipped with well structured Library which has closed access system and is open for eight hours a day without break form 8.30 AM to 4.30 PM, having a seating capacity of hundred students at a time with separate seating for staff. Library subscribes to more than sixty academic Journals and magazines, and twenty one National Newspapers including English, Konkani and Marathi. library has a number of reading materials including fiction, non-fiction, reference books, text books in print and non print materials, The library is equipped with Wi-Fi broadband connectivity and computerised library operations. Annual Book Fair is organised every year with four scholastic book fairs form different publishing houses.

== Sports ==
College has a football/cricket ground and indoor Gymnasium which provides its student with best opportunities to develop their personality through participation in various games. College has excelled in most of the games at National and State levels and has won many prominent tournaments and events in Cricket, Football, weight lifting, Chess, athletics.

=== Indoor and Outdoor Games ===
- Carrom
- Chess
- Table Tennis
- Badminton
- Weight Training
- Weight Lifting
- Power Lifting
- Cricket
- Football
- Athletics
- Volleyball
- Kabaddi
- Hockey
- Handball

=== Facilities Provided ===
- Parents Teachers Association
- Co-operative Society
- Audio-Visual Room And Conference Hall
- Internet
- Canteen
- Common Room For Girls
- First-Aid
- Anti-Ragging Committee
- National Service Scheme (NSS)
- National Cadet corps (NCC)

== See also ==
- Assagao
- Assagao Union High School
- St. Xavier's College, Mapusa, Goa
