= Eight Finger Eddie =

American hippie (1924–2010)

- Born: Yertward Mazamanian; March 8, 1924; Boston, Massachusetts, U.S.
- Died: October 18, 2010 (aged 86); Goa, India
- Resting place: Anjuna, Goa, India
- Occupations: Businessman; bass player

Yertward Mazamanian (March 8, 1924 – October 18, 2010), better known as Eight Finger Eddie, was an American businessman and former bass player. A hippie, he was credited with popularizing the coastal state of Goa, India as a hippie destination from the mid-1960s onward.

== Early life ==
Mazamanian was born with only three fingers on his right hand, and was one of seven children of Armenian immigrants from Istanbul who apparently settled near Boston, Massachusetts. In his memoirs, he claimed to have been a Boy Scout, a regular churchgoer and an "honors student" at school.

== Career ==
During World War II, he convinced an Army psychiatrist that he was unfit for military service, and worked for a while for the General Electric Company before being fired. He later wrote:

I abhor work, begrudging every moment I've wasted as a wage earner. My aim in life is to get through life doing what I want to do.

He performed occasionally as a bass player in jazz bands, consumed large quantities of illegal drugs, married, and divorced, before moving to Southern California around 1950. In the 1950s, he lived for a time in Mexico, and in the early 1960s was based in Copenhagen, traveling to Spain, Morocco and elsewhere with friends in a camper van. Around 1964 he made his first trip to Iran, India and Nepal, eventually settling for a period at Colva in Goa. Around 1966, he settled at Anjuna beach in Goa, at that time "a tiny hamlet with a few tea stalls and houses dotting a pristine sandy beach". Mazamanian once stated:

I was the first freak in Goa. I turned up and liked it so much, I just wanted to stay. And then others started coming. In those days, they came overland from Europe in camper vans and no one had any money ...

He started a soup kitchen at Anjuna, to assist the growing numbers of western travelers who came to the area as a final stopping place on the "hippie trail", and, in 1975, set up a flea market mainly for the foreign hippies wanting to barter their unwanted possessions and "hang out". The presence of Eddie and his companions was tolerated by locals, who would watch as the visitors "consulted the I Ching, performed yogic exercises, sucked earnestly on hashish pipes or argued over the true meaning of Bob Dylan's Sad-Eyed Lady of the Lowlands." Local writer Dominic Fernandes commented that "[T]hey were in love with this place. And we fell in love with them, because of the way they lived."

Apart from regular visits to Kathmandu, and to Bombay to renew his American passport, Eight Finger Eddie remained in Goa for the remainder of his life. The area gradually became a top tourist destination with hotels and casinos catering for a commercial tourist market quite different from its origins in the 1960s and 1970s. The market at Anjuna itself turned into a thriving retail center. In 1991, he commented:

Some people say it's not like it used to be, and it's not. But I like it here now. I like the parties. And I like the music. It's good to dance to.

== Illness and death ==
When he became ill, a Norwegian journalist, Øystein Krogsrud, launched a campaign to raise money for his medical bills. After his death, he was cremated according to Hindu rites, and his ashes scattered at Anjuna.
