= St. Michael's Church, Anjuna =

Roman Catholic church in Anjuna, Goa, India

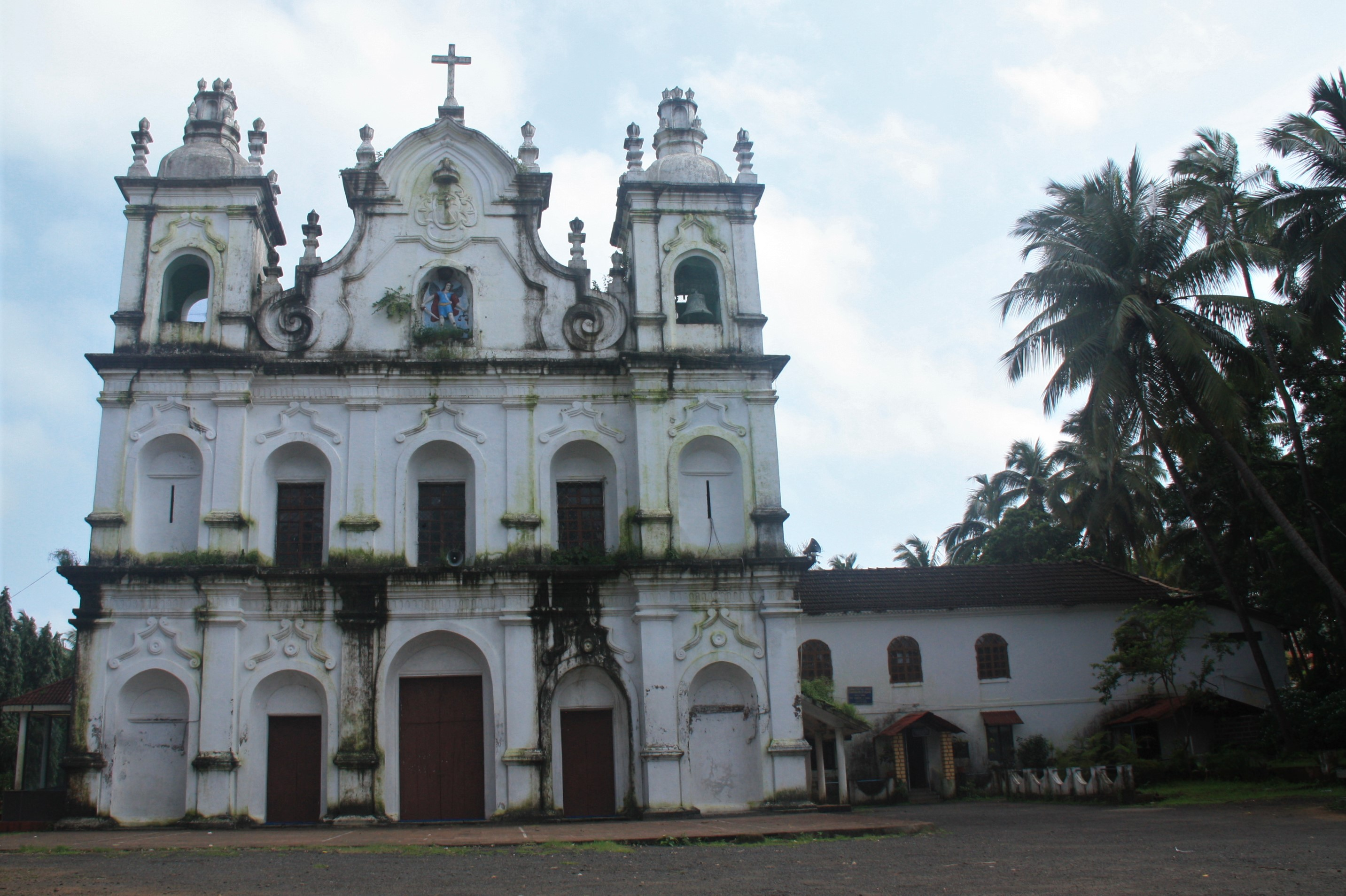
- Facade of the church, 2019

General information
- Architectural style: Baroque
- Location: Anjuna, Goa, India
- Coordinates: 15.590°N 73.764°E

St. Michael's Church is a historic Roman Catholic church located in Anjuna, Goa state, India. It is one of the oldest churches still standing in Goa. It was built in 1613, to serve Goan Catholics in early colonial Portuguese India.
