= Assagao =

Assagao Asganv
- village
- Nickname: Land Of Flowers
- Location in Goa, India Assagao (India)
- Coordinates: 15°35′51″N 73°46′38″E
- Country: India
- State: Goa
- District: North Goa
- Taluka: Bardez

Government
  - Type: Panchayat
  - Sarpanch: -
- Elevation: 8 m (26 ft)

Population (2011)
  - Total: 4,367
- Demonym: Assagaonkar

Languages
  - Official: Konkani
- Time zone: UTC+5:30 (IST)
- PIN: 403507
- Vehicle registration: GA 03
- Nearest city: Mapusa
- Lok Sabha constituency: North Goa
- Website: goa.gov.in

Assagao is a village in Bardez, Goa, India located about 4 kilometres west of Mapusa. It is known as the "Land of Flowers" as well as several other nicknames – "Goa’s South Extension", "Artist’s village", "The Beverly Hills of Goa", "Goa’s Tuscany". The village is surrounded by hills. From Mapusa town, the road u-turns uphill and, while descending the pass in the small plateau, splits into two parallel roads: one which proceeds straight along the St. Cajetan Church, Assagao Union High School to Anjuna and the other, which passes by Pallottine Seminary and Panchayat Office straight to Badem. The popular beaches of Anjuna and Vagator are to the west of Assagao.

== History ==
Like all of Goa, Assagao was long held by the Portuguese. The early inhabitants of Assagao were Saraswat Brahmins of the Atri gotra. There must have been others too. But all were invariably Hindu with Ravalnath being the presiding deity.

== Education ==
Assagao is home to educational institutions including Agnel Institute of Technology and Design Engineering College, DMC College, Assagao Union High School and Government Primary Schools.

== Sports ==
Football and cricket are popular sports in the village. During Monsoon people play football, and an inter-ward football tournament is organised every year. Cricket is played during summer.

== Geography ==
Assagao is located at 15°35′51″N 73°46′38″E at an elevation of 8 metres (26 ft) above MSL.

== Places of interest ==
- Assagao Heritage Walk
- St. Cajetan church is architecturally similar to St Alex's Church in Calangute.
- Dossa-zor spring
- Ghatyeshwar Temple
