= St. Cajetan Church, Assagao =

St Cajetan Church
- St Cajetan Church
- Location: Assagao, Goa
- Country: India
- Denomination: Roman Catholic

History
- Status: Church
- Dedication: Saint Cajetan

Architecture
- Completed: 1775

Administration
- Archdiocese: Archdiocese of Goa and Daman

The Church of St. Cajetan (Portuguese: Igreja de São Caetano), is located in the village of Assagao in Bardez, Goa. It was built as a chapel in the year 1775.

== See also ==
Assagao
