= India International University of Legal Education and Research =

- Type: Private
- Established: December 1, 2022; 3 years ago
- Affiliations: UGC, BCI
- Chancellor: Justice P. S. Narasimha
- Vice-Chancellor: Dr. R. Venkata Rao (I/C)
- Location: Goa, India
- Campus: Urban
- Website: www.iiuler.edu.in/home

India International University of Legal Education and Research at Goa, India is a private international university. The Bar Council of India fund and run this institute. Once established, the university will also operate the International Arbitration Centre and it will be the first international Arbitration centre in India and the second in Asia after Singapore International Arbitration Centre. On December 19, 2021, the foundation stone was laid by PM Narendra Modi.
