= Fr. Agnel Multipurpose School and Junior College =

Fr. Agnel Junior College and Multipurpose School.,

Location
- Juhunagar Vashi Navi Mumbai, [Maharashtra] India; 19°4′36.7″N 72°59′37.28″E

Information
- Type: Private, Coeducational, Day School basic education institution
- Motto: Love Your Neighbor As Yourself
- Established: 1982; 44 years ago
- Founders: Fr. Orlando; Fr. Almeida
- School board: Maharashtra State Board of Secondary and Higher Secondary Education (MSBSHSE)
- School district: Thane district
- Principal: Snigdha Roy
- Grades: KG–12
- Average class size: 60
- Language: English, Marathi
- Campus type: Suburban
- Houses: Red, Green, Blue, Yellow
- Colors: Beige and Brown
Sports
Football basketball throwball hockey	chess swimming tennis table tennis
- Nickname: Agnels
- Yearbook: Agnel Clarion
- Affiliation: Agnel Ashram
- Website: http://www.agnelhamara.net

Fr. Agnel Multipurpose School and Jr. College also known as 'Agnels', is a private school in Juhunagar, Vashi, Navi Mumbai, India. Fr. Agnel Multipurpose School was established in the year 1982 in Juhunagar, Vashi, Navi Mumbai, with the objective of providing comprehensive education to students up to Higher Secondary Certificate Examination. The school is affiliated with the Maharashtra State Board of Education. The school is consistently ranked amongst the best schools in Mumbai.

== Overview ==
Fr. Agnel Multipurpose School and Jr. College is a part of the Father Agnel Ashram's family of educational institutions spread across India. It is a co-educational day school with around 5400 students studying in its two campuses, both located in Juhu-Vashi. It is affiliated to the Maharashtra State Board of Secondary and Higher Secondary Education (MSBSHSE). The Multipurpose School was established in 1982 in the imposing School Building constructed by CIDCO in Sector 9A, Juhunagar (Vashi), with the objective of providing comprehensive education from Nursery to Secondary Certificate Examination to children of all classes and communities from Navi Mumbai area.

== Current status ==
At present, the Institution has two school buildings in two different plots in Sector 9A and Sector 10A, jointly measuring about four acres of land. These buildings-cum-plots have been acquired from CIDCO at the approximate cost of Rupees One Crore. The school (English and Marathi Sections) has been recognised by the Government and is affiliated to the S.S.C. Board, Pune. Presently it has over 4,700 students.

== Academics ==
Initially when the school was established only classes from kindergarten to 7th standard were operational. Gradually, more classes were introduced. The school now has full-time classes from kindergarten right up to standard 12 (Jr. College).

Besides the mandatory subjects prescribed by MSBSHSE, Fr. Agnel School also has optional courses for Sanskrit and technical subjects like carpentry, electrical maintenance, welding etc. These courses are a unique selling point of this school among other secondary schools in and around Navi Mumbai.

Fr. Agnel Jr College admits students for Biology, Computer Science and Electronics disciplines.

Fr. Agnel is often in the news for academic achievements by its students.

== Clubs ==
Fr. Agnel has a number of extra-curricular student clubs. Most notable among those are the Astronomy Club, the Gavel Club and the Nature Club.

== Sports ==
Sports Facilities at Fr. Agnel Multipurpose School

Fr. Agnel claims to have the best of the best sports facilities among schools in India. It is the first school in India to set up a first class-sport artificial turf ground. The sports facility also includes indoor Table Tennis, indoor shooting range, swimming pool, basketball court and badminton court. The Fr. Agnel Stadium (football stadium) has a capacity of around 5,000.

Fr.Agnel Gymkhana has a senior varsity football team which plays in the Super Division MDFA, Mumbai. Agnels had a successful football team in 1996-97-98 but was disbanded after season 1998 for unknown reasons. Since 2004 the team is functioning again and has gained back to back promotions from 3rd to 2nd to 1st and now the super division in 2011. The major credit goes to the management staff which includes Coach Jerome Dias, Manager Harinder Singh Mall (interim coach: Peter Ochanda). The facilities which are world class have played a major part in the success of the FR. Agnel's Gymkhana team.

Lt coach Dilip Desai had led the Fr. Agnels Chess team in several National and International competitions for the last 20 years. Agnels chess team have consistently come 1st in popular inter school Mumbai tournaments like Bournvita and Parle-G. Students have represented Maharashtra and won in U-19 Girls and Boys National Chess Championship organized by Sports Association of India and received Indian Government Scholarships for their performance from 2001 onwards. Many students have also played Commonwealth games and rated Chess tournaments under AICF (All India Chess Federation).

Since 2010, swimming training has been made compulsory for all students. Swimmers from Fr. Agnel have won many accolades at district, state and national level. The swimming team under the guidance of Shiv Chatrapti Awardee Gokul Kamath has won medals at various international competitions most notably being the SAF Games and Asian Age Group. Team members have won over a thousand medals in swimming.

In football, Fr. Agnel is accredited with first residential FIFA-AIFF Academy in India,

In the past, Fr. Agnel has hosted many national-level tournaments like Indian National Basketball Tournament. In 2010, it hosted the 61st Basketball Junior Nationals tournament.

== See also ==
- List of schools in Mumbai
