= Fr. Agnel Stadium =

Football stadium in Maharashtra, India

- Agnel Stadium
- Interactive map of Fr. Agnel Stadium
- Full name: Fr. Agnel Multipurpose School and Junior College Stadium
- Address: India
- Location: Vashi, Navi Mumbai, Maharashtra, India
- Coordinates: 15.3294°N 73.9329°E
- Owner: Fr. Agnel Multipurpose School and Junior College
- Operator: Fr. Agnel Multipurpose School and Junior College
- Capacity: 5,000
- Field size: 103 m × 65 m (338 ft × 213 ft)

Construction
- Built: 2004

Tenants
- Fr. Agnel Gymkhana; Mumbai Tigers F.C.

Website
- www.agnelhamara.net

Fr. Agnel Stadium is a football stadium located in Vashi, Navi Mumbai, Maharashtra, India. It is located at the premises of Fr. Agnel Multipurpose School and Junior College which was established in 1982. The stadium is India's first multi-sport artificial turf ground.

The facilities includes indoor table tennis, indoor shooting range, swimming pool, basketball court and badminton court and has a capacity of around 5,000 spectators. It is the home of Fr. Agnel Gymkhana which plays in Super Division MDFA, Mumbai. The football team had been formed again in April 2004. Fr. Agnel is accredited with first residential FIFA-AIFF Academy in India, and it hosted the 61st Basketball Junior Nationals tournament.
