= Pilar, Goa =

Pilar
- village
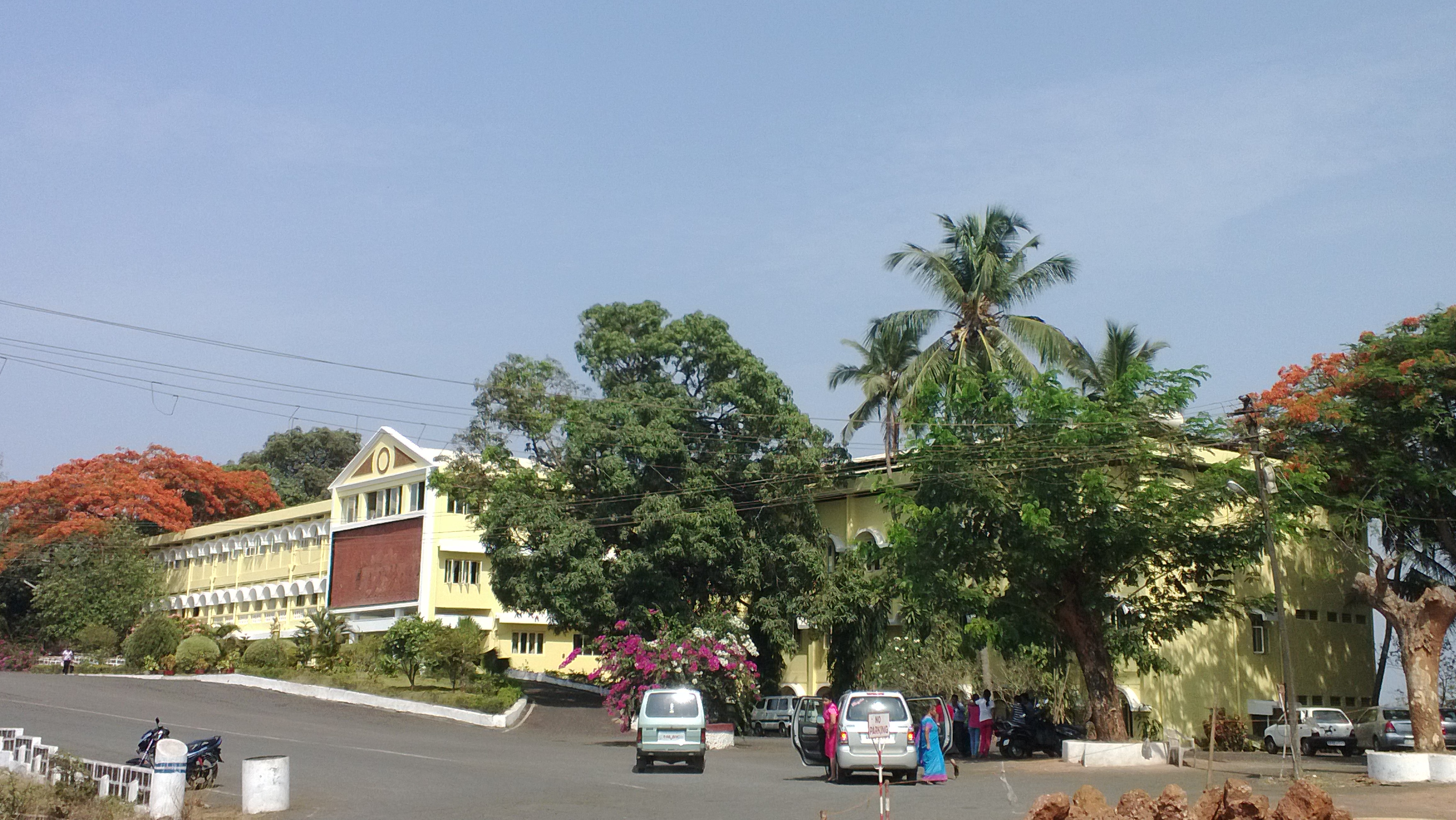
- Campus view of Pilar Seminary

- Location in Goa, India Pilar (India)
- Coordinates: 15°26′27.42″N 73°53′37.90″E
- Country: India
- State: Goa
- District: North Goa

Languages
  - Official: Konkani
- Time zone: UTC+5:30 (IST)
- Postal code: 403203
- Vehicle registration: GA
- Website: goa.gov.in

Pilar is a village in Goa, India, some 10 km from the state capital Panaji. It is on a hill top and has a panoramic view of the Arabian Sea and the mountains all around.

== Etymology ==
The village is named after Our Lady of the Pillar (Nuestra Señora del Pilar in Spanish).

== Pilar Society ==
The headquarters of the Missionary Society of St. Francis Xavier is located at Pilar, hence the common name of Pilar Society given to the missionaries of Saint Francis Xavier. [SFX].

There are pilgrims who visit Pilar every Thursday to venerate the mortal remains of venerable Father Agnelo, a priest of the above-said Society who had lived a virtuous life.

The Pre-Novitiate house is doing well in Pilar. They organised an art exhibition there entitled Waves Of Destruction... Waves of Compassion...

== Gallery ==
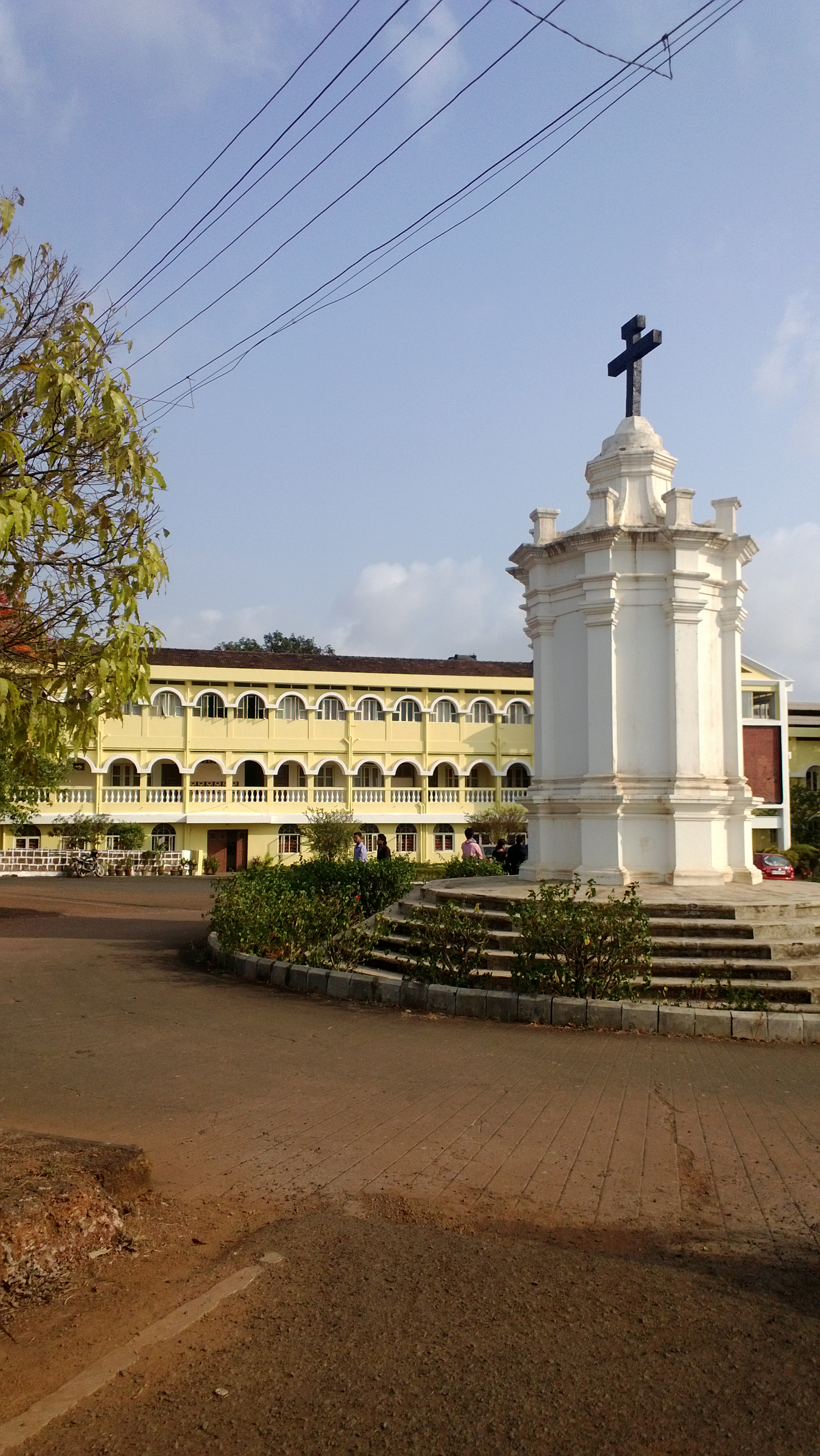
Holy Cross erected at Pilar Seminary, Goa

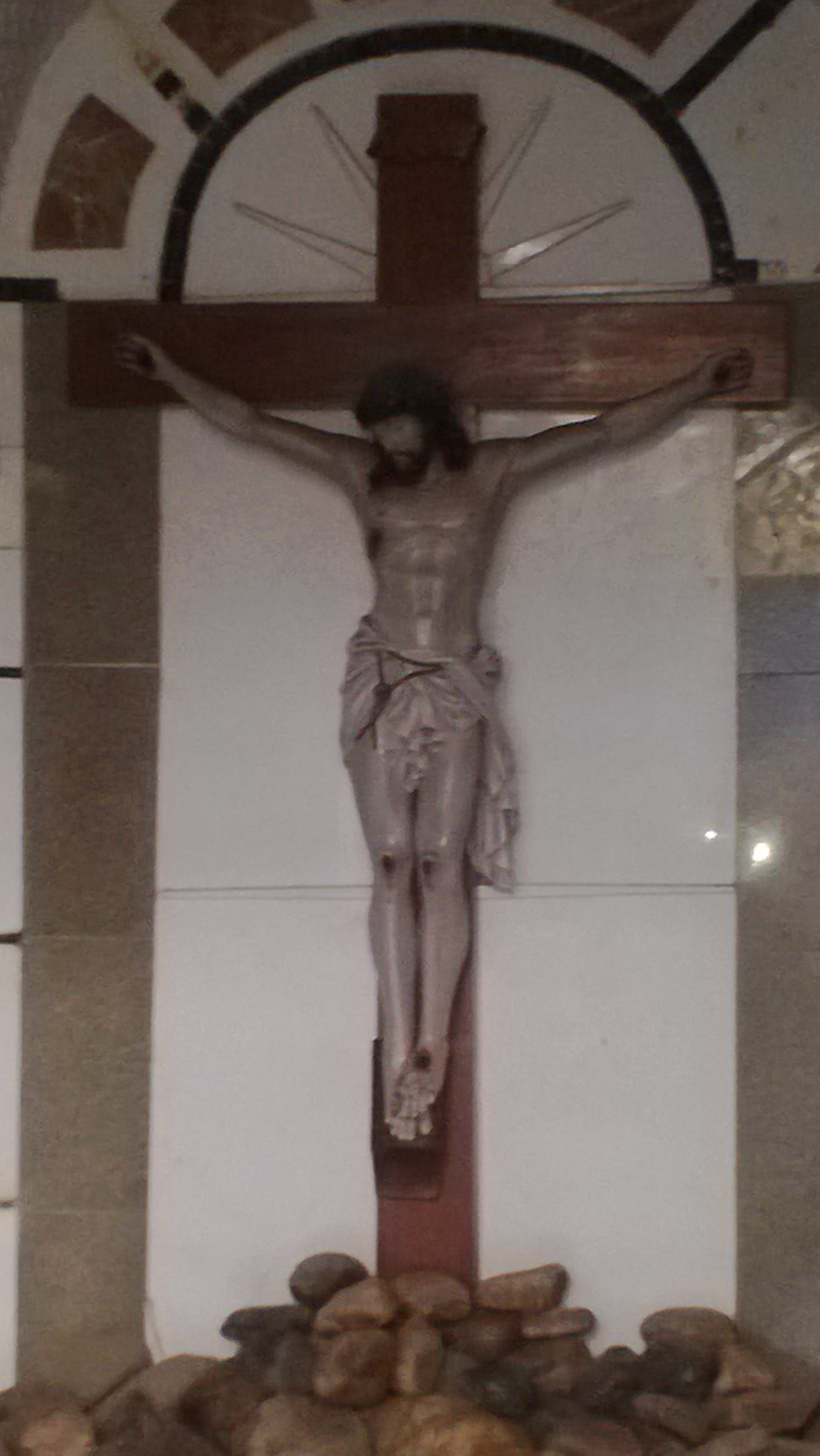
Crucifix inside a Chapel in Pilar Seminary, Goa
