= St. Xavier's College, Mapusa =

Catholic university college in Goa, India

St. Xavier's College
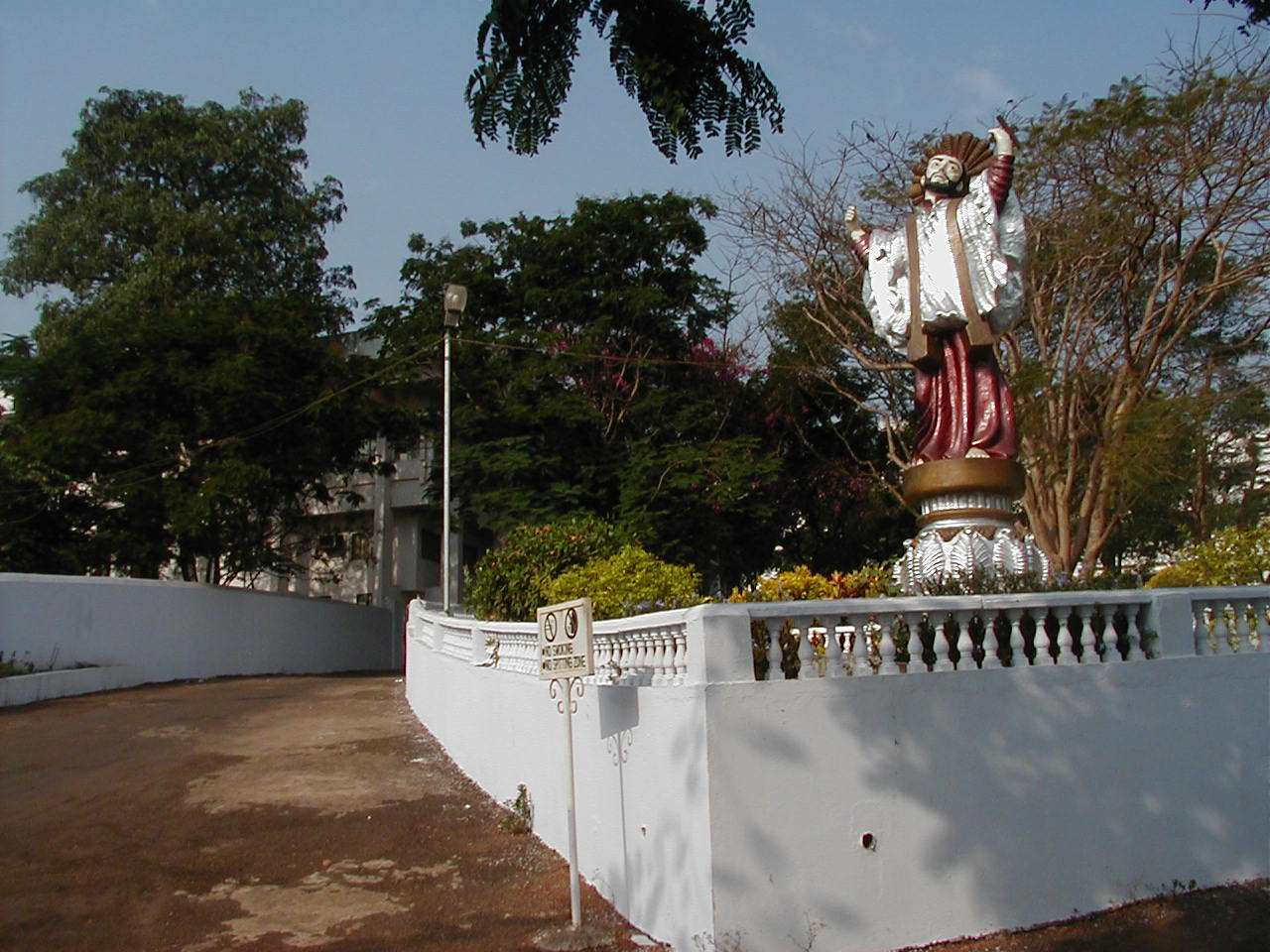
- College entrance, 2006
- Motto: Latin: In Virtute et Scientia
- Motto in English: In Virtue and Knowledge
- Type: Private government aided college
- Established: 1963; 63 years ago
- Founders: Society of Jesus; Archdiocese of Goa and Daman
- Affiliations: NAAC
- Religious affiliation: Catholicism (Jesuits)
- Academic affiliations: Goa University
- Principal: Ursula Barreto
- Administrator: Fr. Tony Salema
- Location: Mapusa, Goa, India; 15°35′51″N 73°48′30″E
- Campus: 22 acres (8.9 ha)
- Patron saint: Francis Xavier, SJ
- Website: www.xavierscollege-goa.com

St. Xavier's College is a private Catholic university college located in the town of Mapusa in the district of North Goa. It is the largest and oldest college in Goa, India. The college is accredited by the NAAC with a Grade "A", or CGPA 3.12 out of 4.

== History ==
The college was among the first set up, in 1963, soon after the end of Portuguese rule in Goa in 1961. It was set up by a team of two Jesuit priests from Bombay (now Mumbai), and is currently administered by the Archdiocese of Goa

== Courses offered ==
=== Undergraduate ===
- BSc – Biotechnology
- BSc – Computer Science
- BSc – Electronics
- BSc – Microbiology
- B.A. – Journalism
- Bachelor of Computer Applications
- Bachelor of Business Administrations
- B.A. – Mass Communication & Videography
- BSc – Botany, Chemistry, Mathematics, Physics
- Bachelor of Business Administrations (Travel & Tourism)
- B.Com. – Accounting, Cost Management Accounting, Business Management, & Banking
- B.A. – Psychology / English / Hindi / Konkani / Marathi (6 units in each)
- B.A. – Economics / History / Sociology / Philosophy (3 units in each)

=== Postgraduate ===
- M.A. – Clinical Psychology, Human Resource Management, Counseling Psychology
- M.Com. – Accounting and Finance, Business Management
- MSc – Physical Chemistry

== Achievements and Recognition ==
St. Xavier’s College, Mapusa has received several academic and institutional recognitions since its establishment in 1963. The college is accredited with an “A” Grade (CGPA 3.12) by the National Assessment and Accreditation Council (NAAC) and has been designated a “College with Potential for Excellence” by the University Grants Commission (UGC). It has also been selected under the Star College Scheme of the Department of Biotechnology, Government of India.

In terms of rankings, the college was placed in the Rank Band 201–300 in the National Institutional Ranking Framework (NIRF) India Rankings 2024, and was ranked 116th nationally in the India Today 2024 list for Commerce (B.Com/Accounting & Commerce).

The institution has also been recognised for its excellence in sports. In 2023–24, it was declared the Best College in Sports by Goa University for the second consecutive year. Students such as Vinay Harji (TYBA) and Chanel Crizzle (FYBA) were named the Best Sportsman and Best Sportswoman of Goa University, respectively, while others secured victories in inter-collegiate tournaments, including hockey and powerlifting.

== Notable alumni ==
- Ramakant Khalap – lawyer and politician who served as Union Minister for Law and Justice; he has been identified as an alumnus of St. Xavier's College, Mapusa.
- Alina Saldanha – politician and former Goa Minister for Environment and Forests; she has been identified as an alumna of the college.
- Francis Borges – long-distance runner and Global Head of a Food Value Chain; he completed his further studies at St. Xavier's College, Mapusa, before pursuing higher education in Mumbai. He received a six-star medal from the World Marathon Majors.
- Pedro Rodrigues – Jesuit priest and educator who served as Provincial of the Goa Province of the Society of Jesus; he pursued a BA from St. Xavier's College, Mapusa.
- Daksha Shirodkar – actress, theatre artist and director; she is an alumna of the college's Mass Communication department and subsequently trained at the National School of Drama.
- Vardhan Dhiamokar – film editor and director; listed among the notable alumni of St. Xavier's College, Mapusa.
- Agnelo Raymond D'Souza – filmmaker and media academic; founder of the film club, Cinemaniacs which promotes Filmmaking in Goa. He has directed music videosand creative media projects, including Goa Song(Amchem Goa), Let's Vote and Goa streets Flash Mob. His work spans filmmaking, music video production and social media content strategy.
- Tanisha Pawar – filmmaker and alumna of the Mass Communication and Journalism programme; she wrote and directed the Konkani documentary Hovyo: Echoes of the Past, which explores Goa's traditional folk-singing heritage. The documentary has gained recognition through selections at national and international film festivals.

== Controversy ==
On 22 January 2022, ABVP Goa protested at the college campus over non-installation of the student council for the year 2022-23

On 20 April 2025, a Nagpuri cultural event was held at the college which turned into a controversy after it was reported that attendees were consuming alcohol on campus, despite the event having prior approval from the college and guidelines prohibiting such activities. The event, organized by a Jharkhand-based group, was expected to attract a large crowd and promote Nagpuri music, dance, and traditions. However, videos circulating on social media showed violations of the college's rules, leading to criticism and a police complaint. Crowds were also reported to have gathered at the Mapusa Bus Stand, engaging in public drinking, further exacerbating the situation
