= Agnelo de Souza =

Portuguese Catholic priest (1869–1927)

Venerable Agnelo Gustavo Adolfo de Souza SFX
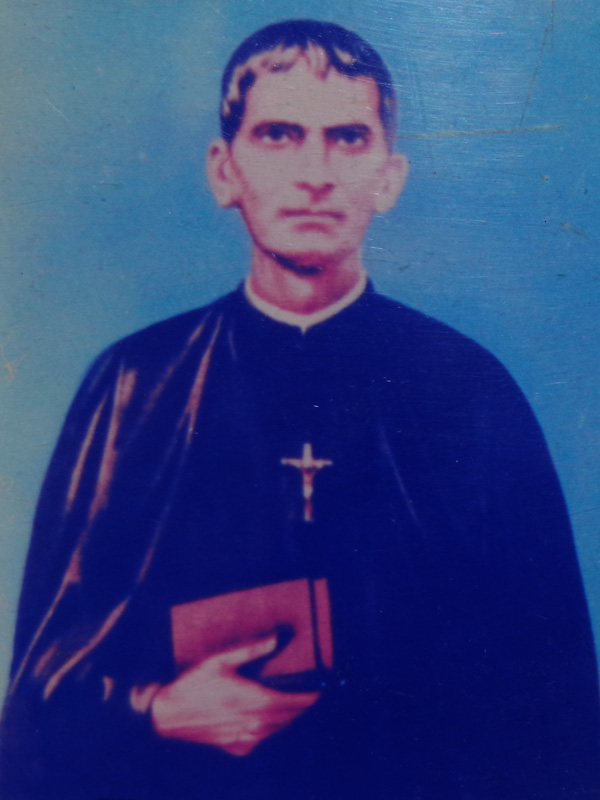
- Portrait of de Souza, early 20th century
- Church: Roman Catholic Church

Orders
- Ordination: 24 September 1899 by Archbishop António Sebastião Valente

Personal details
- Born: Agnelo Gustavo Adolfo de Souza; 21 January 1869 Anjuna, Goa, Portuguese India
- Died: 20 November 1927 (aged 58) Rachol, Goa Portuguese India,
- Buried: Our Lady of Pilar Monastery, Pilar, Goa
- Education: Rachol Seminary

Agnelo Gustavo Adolfo de Souza SFX (21 January 1869 – 20 November 1927), was a Portuguese Roman Catholic priest in India. He was a member of the Society of Pilar and performed missionary work in Goa, then part of Portuguese India. The cause for his beatification has been accepted for investigation by the Holy See, and has progressed to the point that he has been declared venerable.

== Life ==
=== Early life ===
De Souza was born in the village of Anjuna, Portuguese Goa, to Miguel Arcanjo de Souza and Maria Sinforosa Perpetua Magalhães. His parents had nine children, eight sons and a daughter, among whom Agnelo was the sixth child. Even as a small child, all were impressed by his behaviour. From a young age he would remember sermons heard at Mass and would teach doton'n (catechism), to other children, some even older than him. When De Souza was eleven, his parents died suddenly. As his mother was dying, she entrusted her children to the care of Mary, the mother of Jesus.

=== Seminary ===
With the encouragement of an older brother who was already a priest, de Souza pursued a call to the priesthood. He studied philosophy and theology at the Patriarchal Seminary at Rachol. Always in very poor health, he was allowed to live in a private dwelling off the seminary grounds, where he was able to do his studies diligently. He secured the much coveted and singular honor of acessit in his final year of study.

Souza wanted to enter a religious institute, but they had been banned in the lands under the Portuguese Crown since 1835. After much prayer and reflection, de Souza joined the Diocesan Missionary Society of St. Francis Xavier of Pilar on 17 July 1897. He was ordained on 24 September 1898, by the Archbishop of Goa and Patriarch of the East Indies, António Sebastião Valente.

=== Missionary ===
On 8 September 1908, de Souza became a full-fledged member of the Society. His life as a priest took him to Siroda and Sanvordem in Goa, besides Kumta, near Karwar. He was their priest, preacher, confessor and administrator.

=== Spiritual Director ===
The then Archbishop of Goa e Damão and Patriarch of the East Indies, Mateus de Oliveira Xavier, appointed de Souza as the Spiritual Director of the Patriarchal Seminary of Rachol on 20 May 1918.

== Death and beatification process ==
De Souza died on the feast of the Sacred Heart of Jesus, which was on 20 November in 1927. He collapsed on the pulpit towards the end of the sermon. He insisted on waiting till the Benediction of the Sacred Heart of Jesus before leaving his post. He was buried in Rachol. The parish priest who buried him roughly said these words "Hanvem atanch eka Santak matiek laila", which means "I have just laid a saint to rest." His remains were brought to Pilar on 10 January 1939.

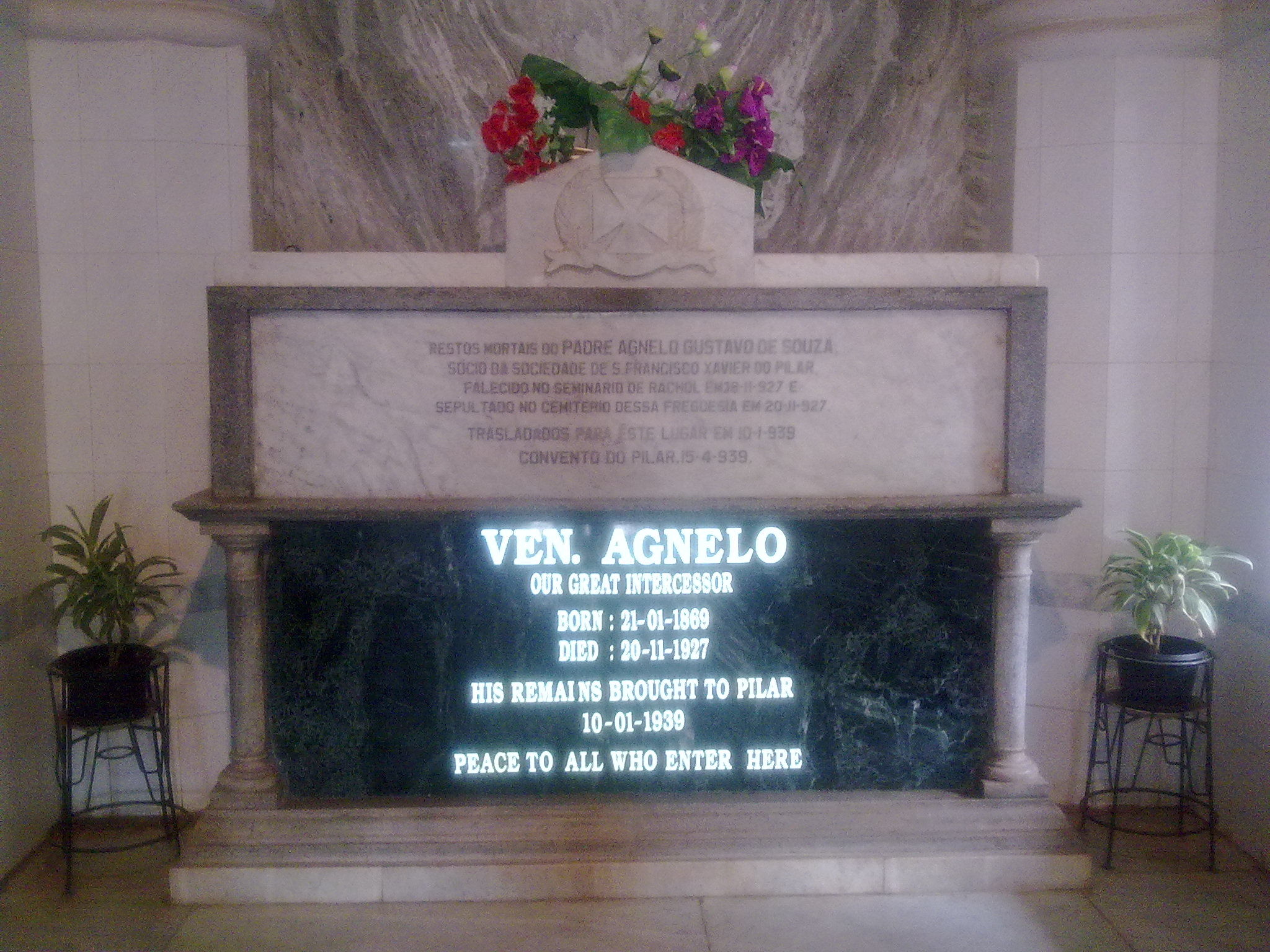
Tomb of Father Agnel

=== Beatification process ===
The beatification process was begun by the Society with the permission of the Patriarch of Goa in 1947. The second process was presented to the Sacred Congregation of Rites on 5 October 1959. The Sacred Congregation of Rites approved the third process of De non-cultu on 27 May 1969. De Souza was declared venerable by the Vatican on 10 November 1986. The vice-postulator for his cause is Hilario Fernandes.

== Legacy ==
Each year, 20 November is commemorated by Venerable Agnelo’s Day in Goa.

The hymn Padr Agnel, amchea ixtta (Father Agnel, our friend) was written in his honor, besides Padr Agnelak, Altaracho Man and several others.

A road in Panaji, Goa is named as Father Agnel Road. A road in Gogol, Margao is also named in his honour.
