= Verna, Goa =

Verna
- Town
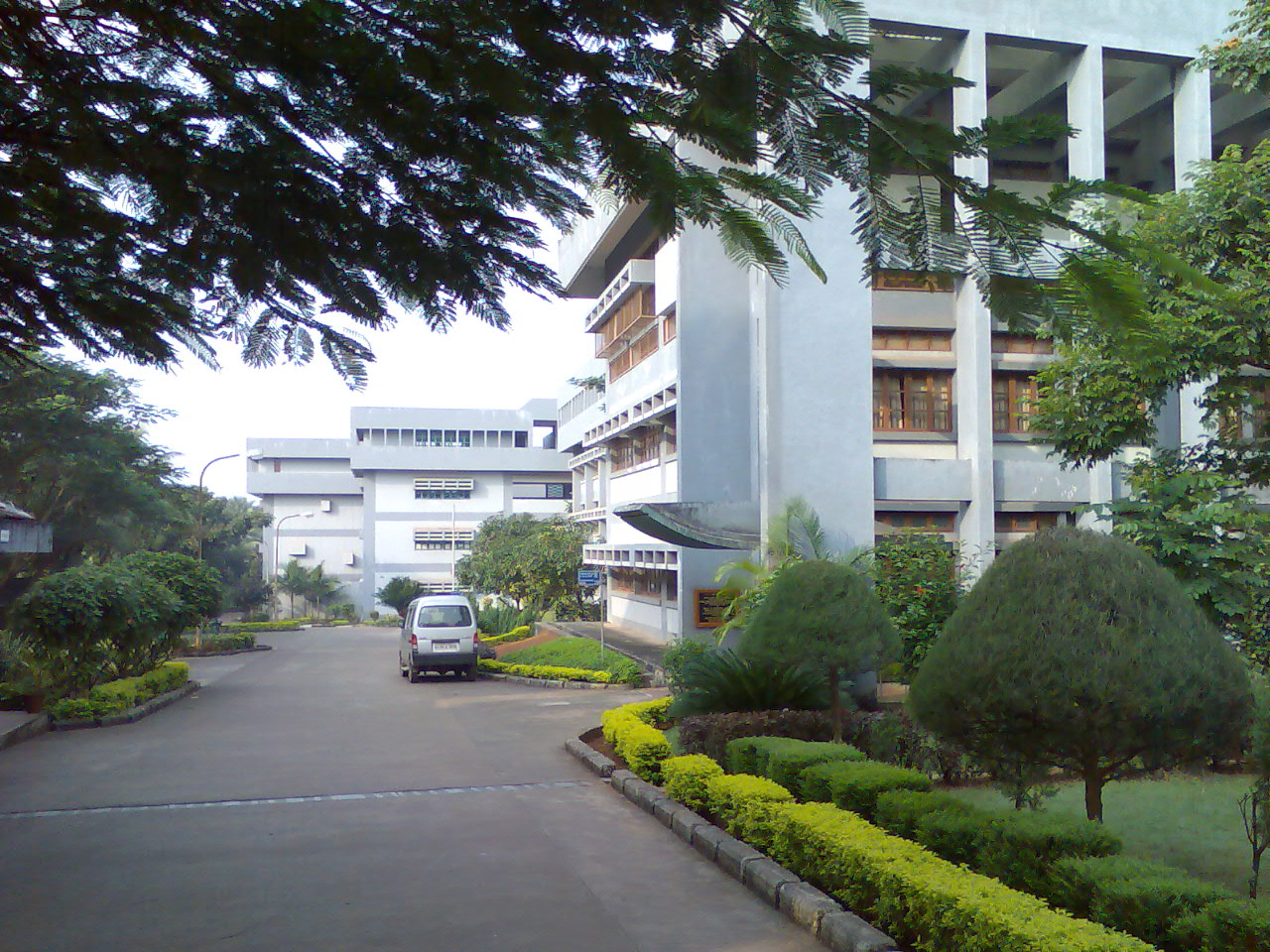
- Padre Conceição College of Engineering in Verna

- Location of Verna in Goa Verna (India)
- Coordinates: 15°20′57″N 73°55′53″E
- Country: India
- State: Goa
- District: South Goa
- Sub-district: Salcete

Government
  - Body: Panchayat

Population
  - Total: 6,632
- Time zone: UTC+5:30 (IST)
- Postcode: 403722
- Area code: 0832
- Website: goa.gov.in

Verna is a census town located in Salcete, Goa, India, adjacent to the village of Nagoa. It is located approximately 10 km north of the South Goa district headquarters Margão, 18 km south-east of Vasco da Gama and 23 km south-east of the state capital Panjim. It houses the hub of Verna Industrial Area where migrants from different parts of India come to work in the production sector.

== Population ==
For the purposes of the Census, Verna is considered to be a "census town" (though it is a panchayat area) and in 2011 had a population of 6,632—comprising 3,249 males and 3,383 females as per report released by Census India 2011.

There were 1041 women for every 1000 males, indicating perhaps the high out-migration from the area, mainly for temporary employment overseas and elsewhere. Verna had 638 children under six years of age in 2011, of whom 326 were male and 312 female.

The Christian population of Verna in 2011 was 5,308 (80.05%) and there were 1,191 (17.96%) Hindus and 90 (1.37%) Muslims. The Scheduled Tribe population was 2,516 and there were 48 Scheduled Caste members, according to the censusndia.co.in site.

Verna Census Town has total administration over 1,668 houses to which it supplies basic amenities like water and sewerage. It is also authorize to build roads within Census Town limits and impose taxes on properties coming under its jurisdiction.

== Geography ==
Verna is located in Salcete, South Goa. Its geographical coordinates are 15°20′57″N 73°55′53″E.

== Etymology ==
The village is named after the Sanctuary of La Verna in Italy. The name Verna in Latin means springtime, verdant or fresh. It matches with the Portuguese nickname for Verna, ' terra de frescura ' (land of freshness). It is said that a particular locality in Verna was called Varunapuri in the past.

== Education ==
The Padre Conceição College of Engineering (PCCE) is a private engineering college in Verna. The college is a part of Agnel Technical Education Complex, Verna, Goa and is the first private engineering college in the state.

Marina English High School is next to the Holy Cross Church, Verna, Goa, established in 1963, is founded by MRS.Maria Rodrigues.

== Landmarks ==
- Holy Cross Church is the parish church of Verna.
- Mhalsa Narayani temple at Verna plateau.

=== By Rail ===
Verna railway station, Cansaulim Rail Way Station are the very nearby railway stations to Verna. However Madgaon Rail Way Station is amajor railway station 11 km from Verna

== Airports ==
Airports nearest to Verna; sorted by the distance to the airport from the city centre.

- Dabolim Airport (distanced approximately 14 km)
- Belgaum Airport (distanced approximately 94 km)
- Kolhapur Airport (distanced approximately 150 km)
- Ratnagiri Airport (distanced approximately 190 km)
- Mangalore Airport (distanced approximately 290 km)
- Mopa Airport (distanced approximately 60.5 km)

== Gallery ==
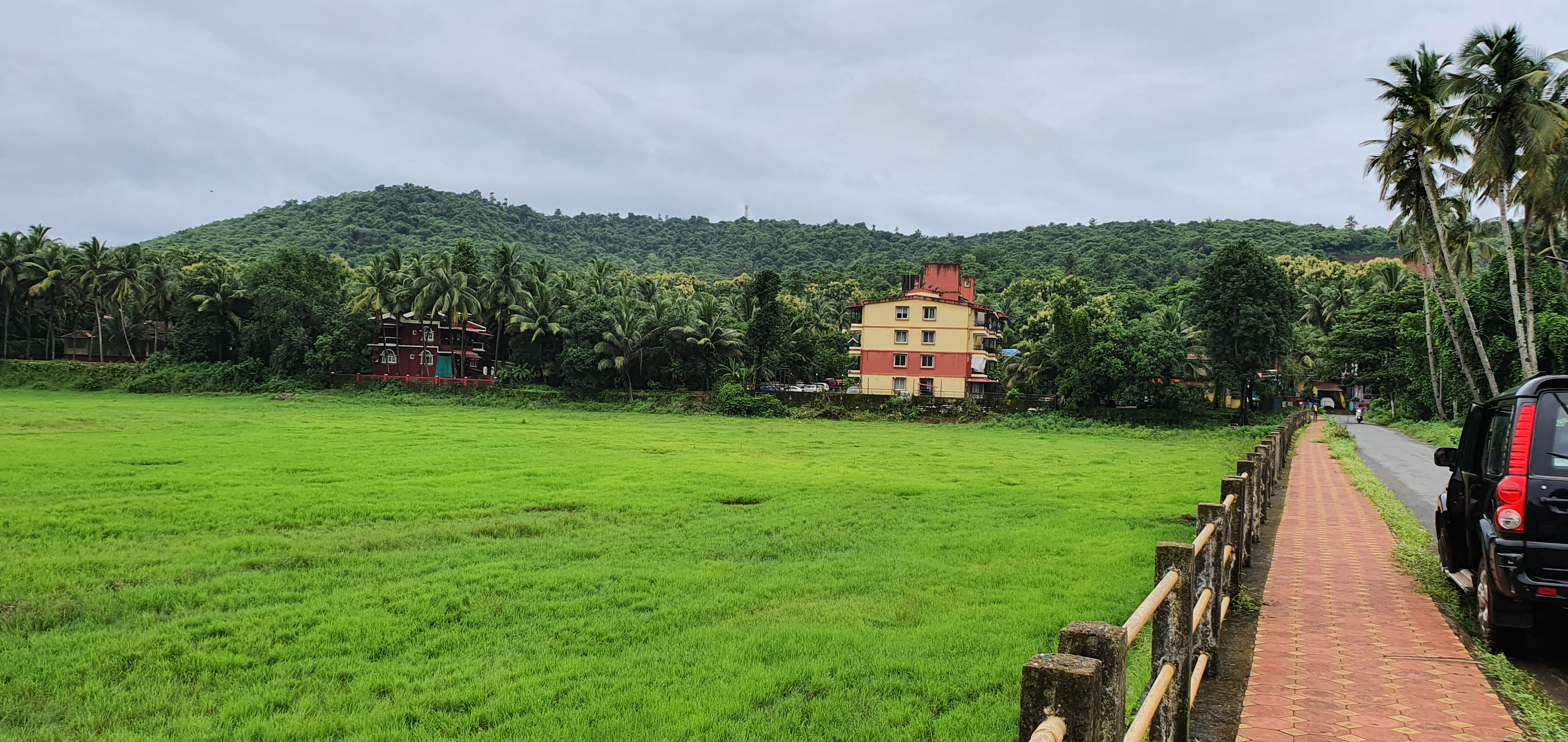
Fields of Verna near Udear Springs

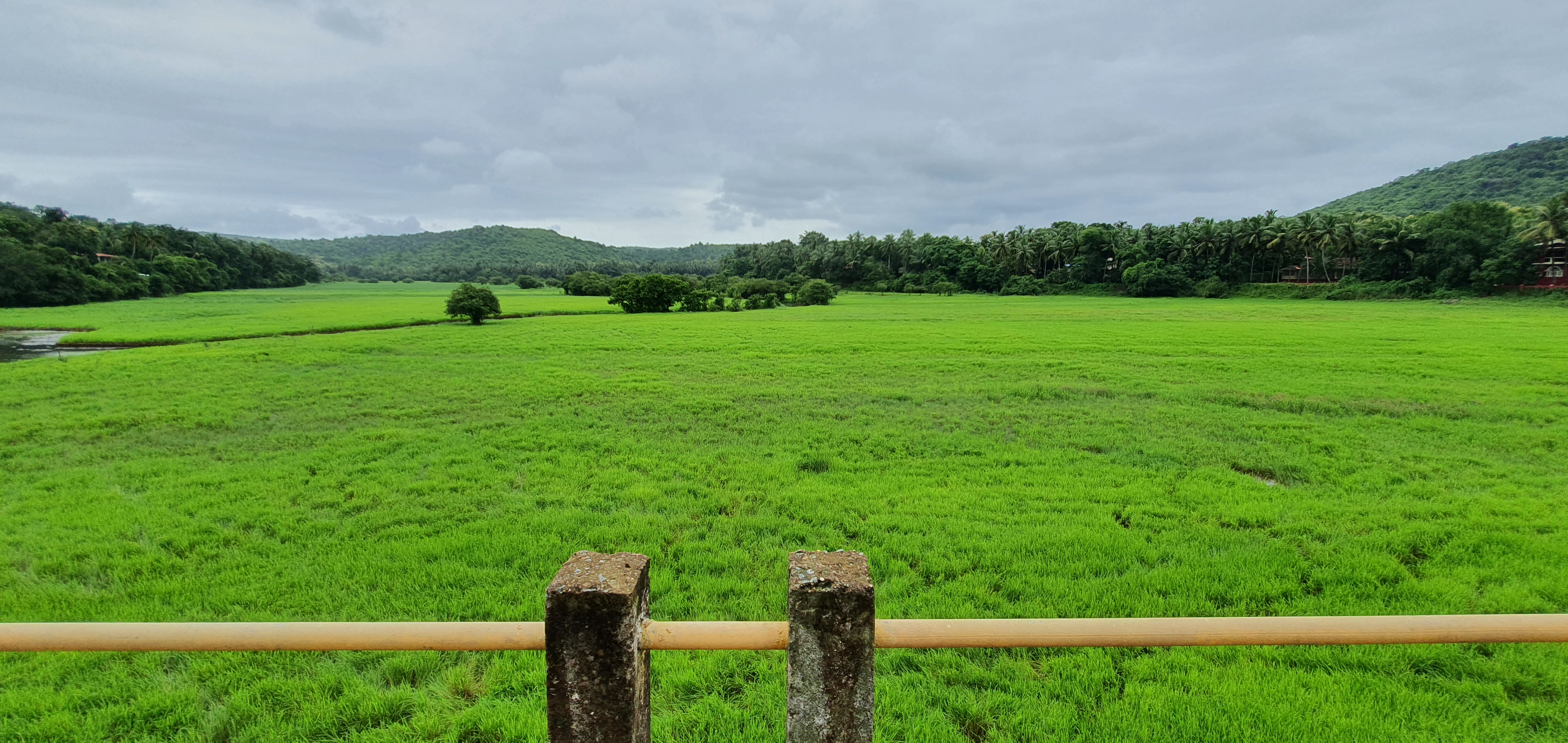
Fields of Verna near Udear Springs
Images from Verna, Goa, India
