= Anjuna =

- Town
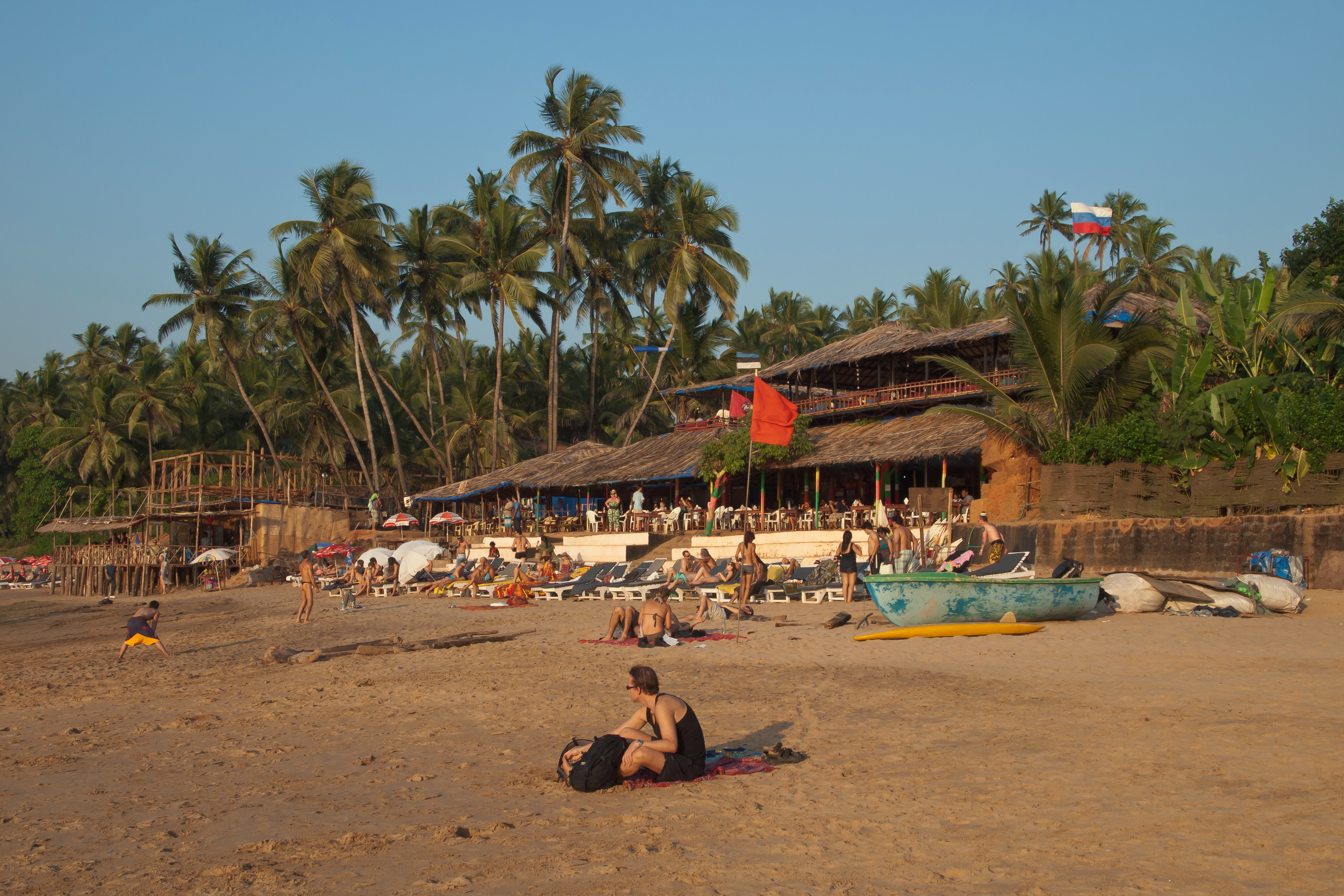
- Anjuna Beach in 2010

- Location in Goa, India Anjuna (India)
- Coordinates: 15°35′41.145″N 73°45′3.326″E
- Country: India
- State: Goa
- District: North Goa

Government
  - Body: Panchayat
- Elevation: 5 m (16 ft)

Population (2011)
  - Total: 9,636

Languages
  - Official: Konkani
- Time zone: UTC+5:30 (IST)
- PIN: 403509
- Telephone code: 91 832
- Vehicle registration: GA 03
- Nearest city: Mapusa
- Sex ratio: 0.98 ♂/♀
- Literacy: 94 %%
- Lok Sabha constituency: North Goa
- Vidhan Sabha constituency: Siolim
- Civic agency: Panchayat
- Climate: Tropical (Köppen)
- Website: goa.gov.in

Anjuna (/ænˈdʒuːnə/, an-JOO-nə; Konkani pronunciation: [ɦɔɳzuɳẽ]) is a census town located on the coast of North Goa, India. It is one of the twelve comunidades of Bardez. It is widely known as one of Goa's tourist destinations.

Its church, St. Michael's Church, Anjuna, founded in 1595, is dedicated to Saint Michael, and celebrates the feasts of Saint Michael (29 September) and Nossa Senhora Advogada (second week of January). There are three large chapels in the parish: the one to St. Antonio in Praias, to Nossa Senhora de Saude (Mazalvaddo), and to Nossa Senhora de Piedade (Grande Chinvar). The chapel at Vagator became the church of the new parish of Vagator, dedicated to St. Antonio, in the twentieth century.

== History ==
Like all of Goa, Anjuna was long held by the Portuguese. In 1950, it had a population of 5,688 and, in 2011, its population was 9,636.

Historian Teresa Albuquerque reports that the village's name is derived from the Arabic word 'Hanjuman' (meaning Merchant Guild). Others say it comes from an Arabic word for "change" - as people used to arrive at Anjuna from the sea looking to change money.

It became a destination on the hippie trail during the late 1960s.

== Activities ==
Anjuna is famous for trance parties held on its beach during the tourist season (October - April). Goa trance—a sub genre of trance music—has its origins in Anjuna.

Anjuna also hosts the famous flea market (every Wednesday and Saturday), in which products from all over India, as well as from foreigners, are sold, ranging from fruits to jewelry, to clothes, to hashish and electronic devices. On Wednesdays, there is a day market which starts in the morning and ends at 7:30 pm and on Saturdays, there is a night market.

== Anjuna beach ==
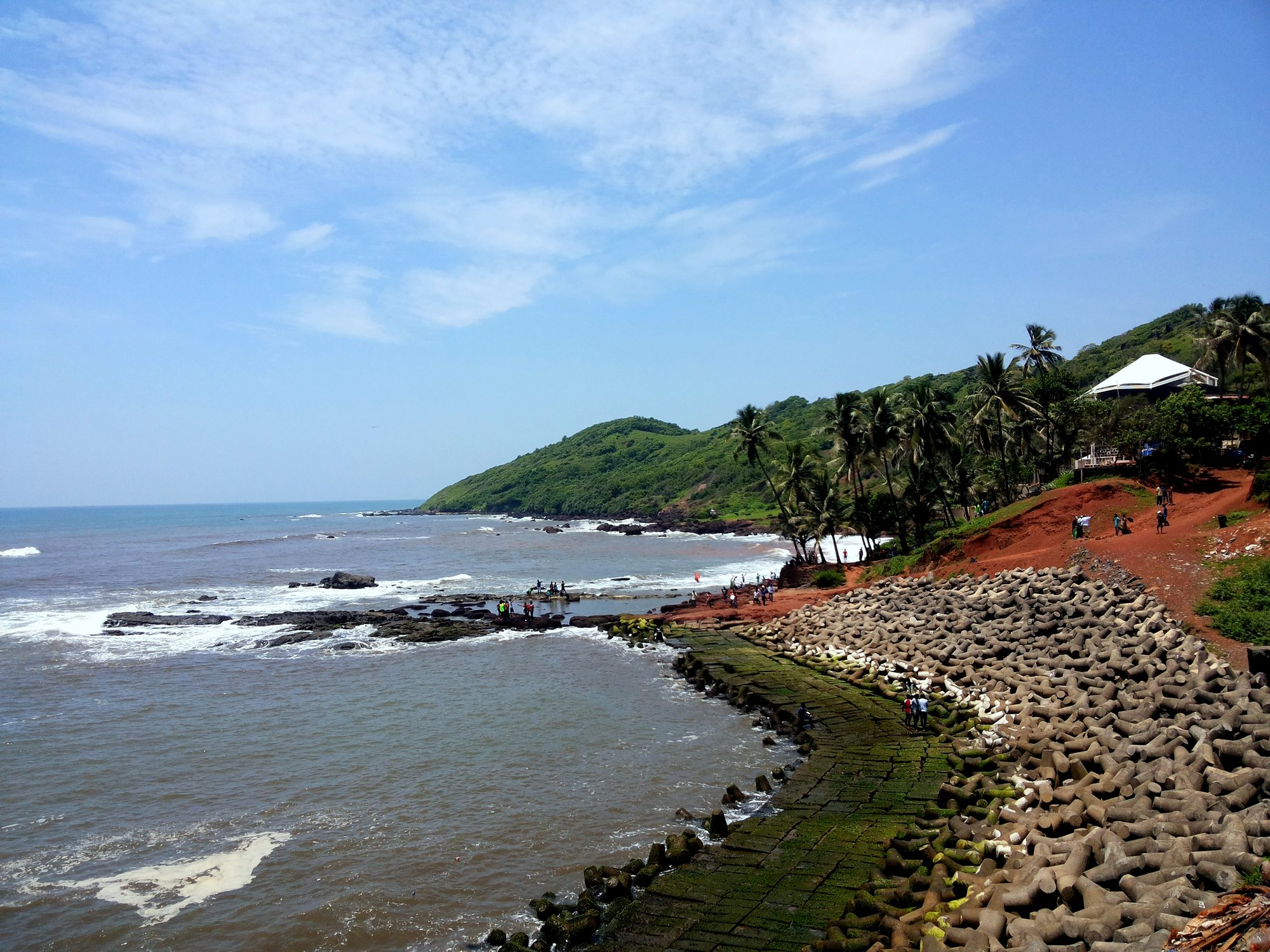
Anjuna Beach in 2015

The Anjuna beach is situated within the town, which is located 18 kilometers from Panaji and 8 kilometers to the west of Mapusa, North Goa. The beach is part of a 30 kilometer stretch of extended beach coastline along the west coast of Goa by the Arabian Sea. The beach is known for world-class snorkeling and wildlife viewing.

Attractions close to Anjuna beach include the Anjuna flea market and Chapora Fort, which can be seen from the beach.

== Gallery ==
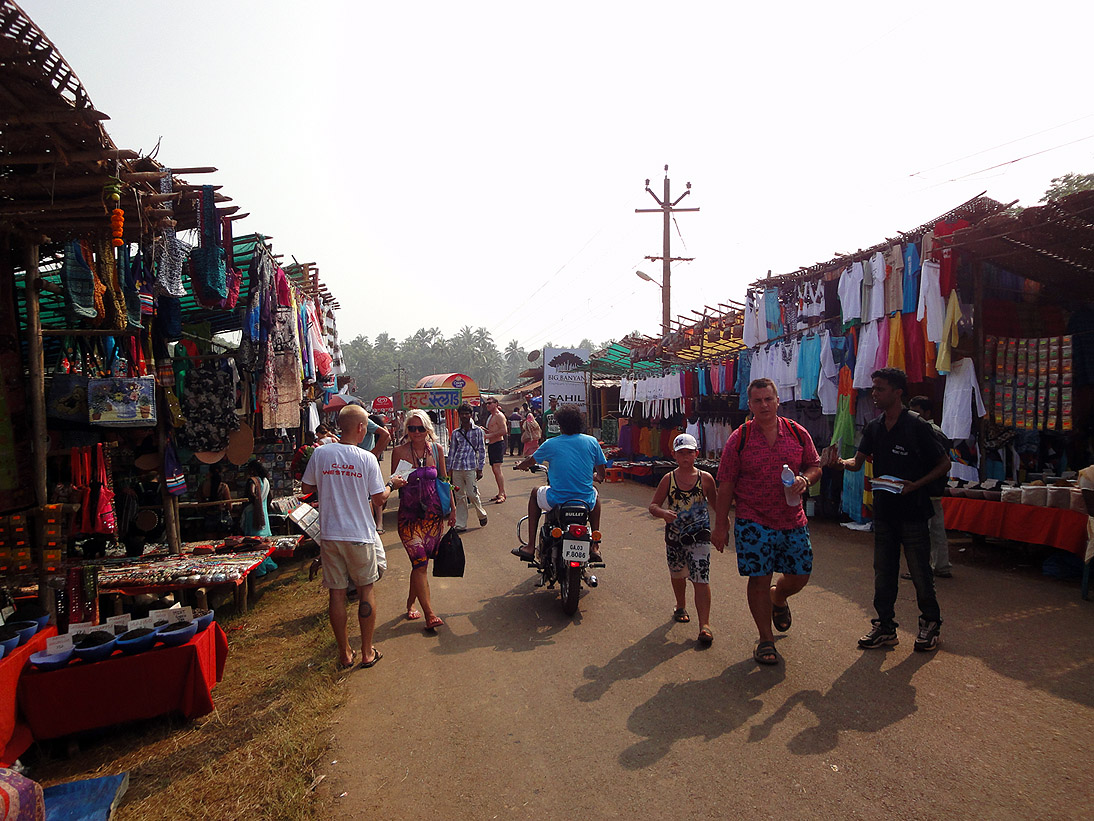
Anjuna flea market runs from dawn till dusk every Wednesday.

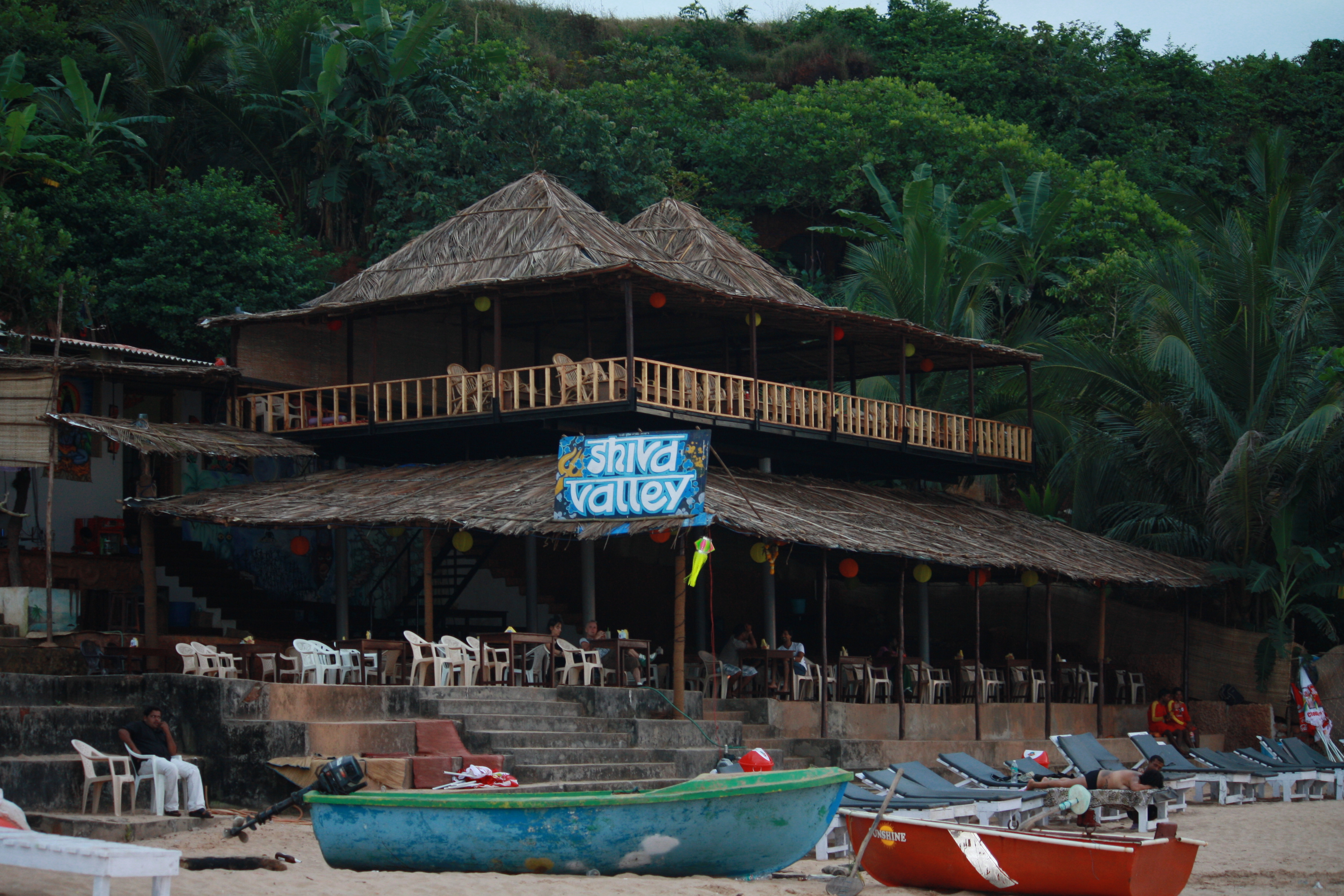
A typical Shack Hotel at Anjuna beach

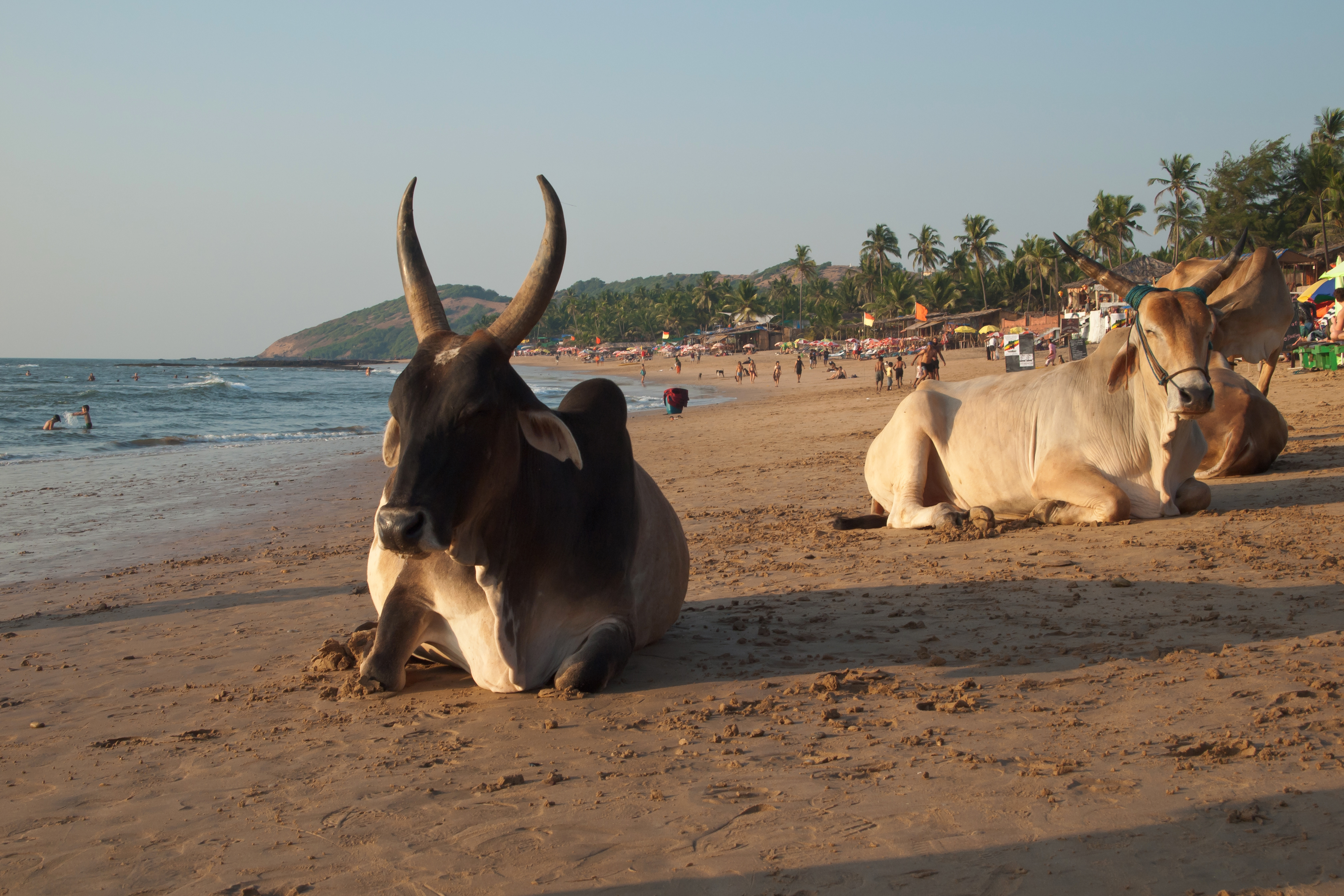
Panoramic view of Anjuna Beach

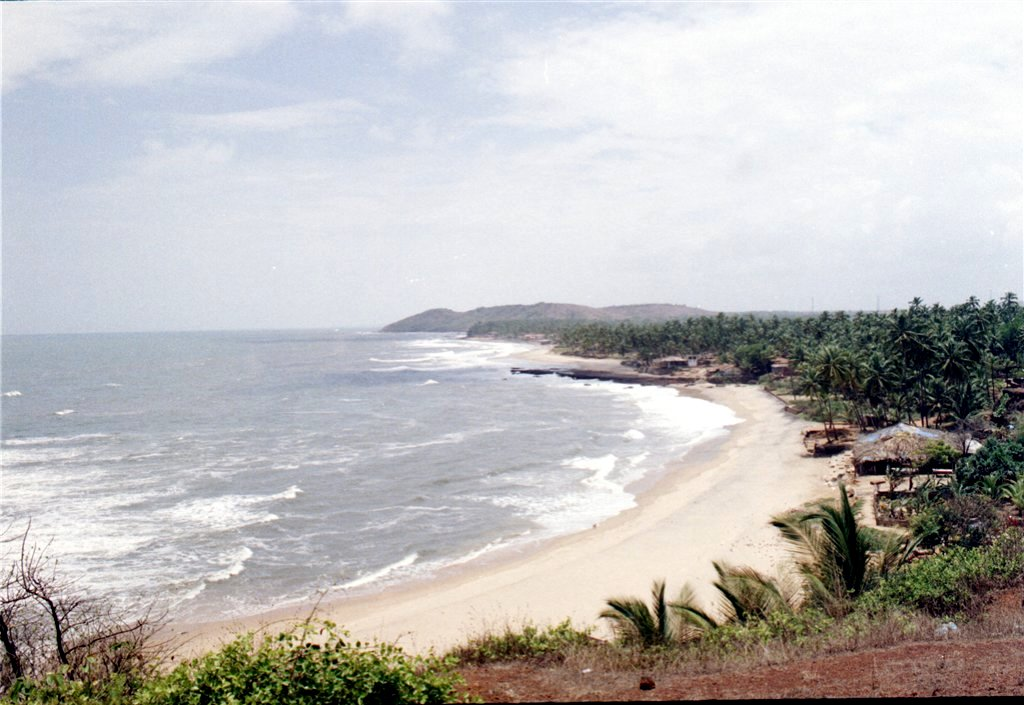
Anjuna hill

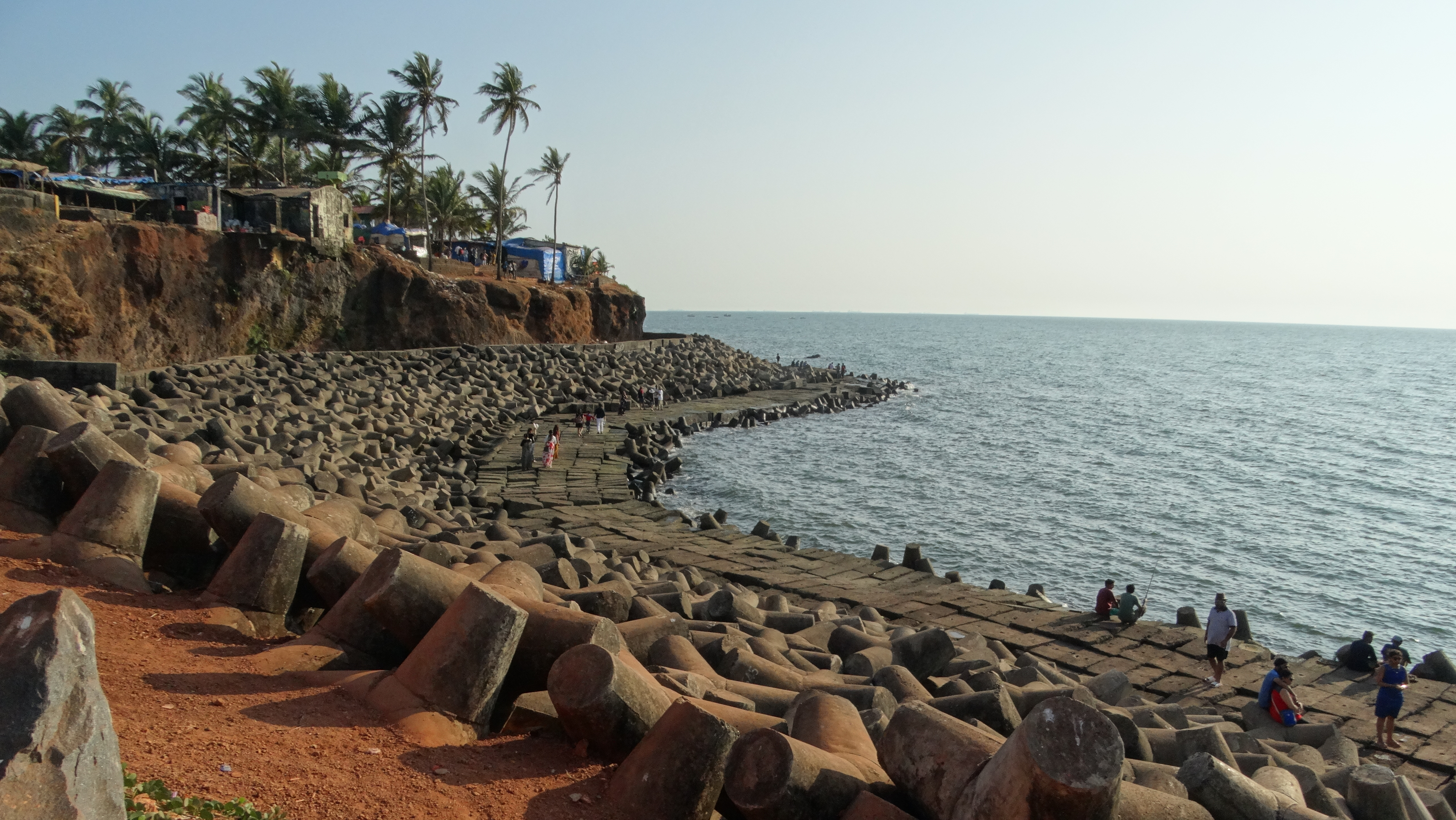
Anjuna waterfront

== Notable residents ==
- Eight Finger Eddie (1924–2010), American hippie
- Goa Gil (1951–2023), American DJ
- Cleo Odzer (1950–2001), American author
- Alu Mendonca, Kenyan field hockey player

== In popular culture ==
Above & Beyond's record labels, Anjunabeats and Anjunadeep, as well as their radio show, Anjunabeats Worldwide, all make reference to Anjuna. In 2009, they also released a track called "Anjunabeach". Anjuna beach is also famous for the hippie lifestyle.
