= Fr. Conceicao Rodrigues Institute of Technology =

Private engineering college in Vashi, Navi Mumbai, India

- Motto: Love Your Neighbour as Yourself
- Type: Private
- Established: 1994
- Accreditation: NAAC Grade B++
- Principal: Dr. S M Khot
- Location: Navi Mumbai, Maharashtra, India; 19.075551°N 72.991490°E
- Website: www.fcrit.ac.in

Father Conceicao Rodrigues Institute of Technology (FCRIT) is a private engineering college affiliated to the University of Mumbai located in Vashi, Navi Mumbai. The institute offers the B.E degree courses in Computer Engineering, Electrical Engineering, Mechanical Engineering, Electronics and Telecommunication Engineering and Information Technology.

== History ==
FCRIT was established in 1994 as a part of the Agnel Technical Education Complex at Vashi, which itself was established in 1984. The institute is named to commemorate Rev. Fr. Conceicao Rodrigues.

== Accreditation and affiliation ==
FCRIT is a private, autonomous institute affiliated to the University of Mumbai. It offers a four-year baccalaureate course culminating in the B.E. degree conferred by the university. The institute has been graded "A" by the Directorate of Technical Education, Government of Maharashtra State. It is recognised by the AICTE and has received accreditation from the National Board of Accreditation(NBA), New Delhi.

== Related links ==
- University of Mumbai
- Agnel Ashram
