= Thugs of Goa =

Indian crime thriller film

- Theatrical release poster
- Directed by: Sai Patil
- Written by: Sai Patil
- Produced by: Sai Patil
- Starring: Suryansh Tripathi; Gayatri Bansode; Ruchika Singh; Manveer Singh
- Cinematography: Pravin Yadav
- Edited by: Keval Shah
- Music by: Ravi
- Production company: Sai Patil Film Factory
- Distributed by: Jai Viratra Entertainment Ltd
- Release date: 30 May 2025
- Running time: 96 minutes
- Country: India
- Language: Hindi

Thugs of Goa is a 2025 Indian crime thriller film starring Suryansh Tripathi.

== Production ==
The film is written, directed, and produced by Sai Patil, with Yojana Patil as co-producer and Milind Desai as executive producer under the banner of Sai Patil Film Factory. Cinematography is handled by Pravin Yadav, while Keval Shah serves as the editor. Music and background score are composed by Ravi, and costume is designed by Arun Kumar.

The film has been released on 30 May 2025. It has been certified 'A' by the Central Board of Film Certification (CBFC). Filming took place entirely in Goa, primarily in Siolim and Vagator.

== Cast ==
- Suryansh Tripathi as Amar Agnihotri
- Gayatri Bansode as Saloni Singh
- Ruchika Singh as Neha Singh
- Manveer Singh as Vicky Thapar
- Sagar Pabbale as Inspector Vijay
- Harshit Upadhyay as Rakesh Kumar
- Pranay Teli as the Home Minister
- Ankita Desai as Priyanka
- Vikky Mote as Jigar
- Vikky Mote as Jigar
- Giriraj Kulkarni as Goga
- Sunil Kusegaonkar as Ashok Kumar
- Rajdev Jamdade as Jatin
- Yogesh Kumawat as Pradip
- Navnath Shrimandilkar as Raghav

== Plot ==
Set in the locales of Siolim and Vagator in Goa, the story follows Amar, a clever con artist who, along with his partners Saloni, Neha and Vicky, survives by scamming unsuspecting victims. Their criminal operation takes a deadly turn when Crime Branch Officer Vijay blackmails Neha into infiltrating the circle of Rakesh Kumar, the powerful son of a corrupt home minister, to steal incriminating documents. As Neha gets caught in a web of danger, Amar is forced into a direct confrontation with the law in a high-stakes game of survival.
