= Chapora =

Chapora is a Goan placename that can mean:

- Chapora River, a river in Northern Goa, India
  - Chapora Fort, a fort on the banks of the Chapora river
  - Chapora Beach, a beach and village near the fort.
