= Alexyz =

Indian cartoonist (born 1944)

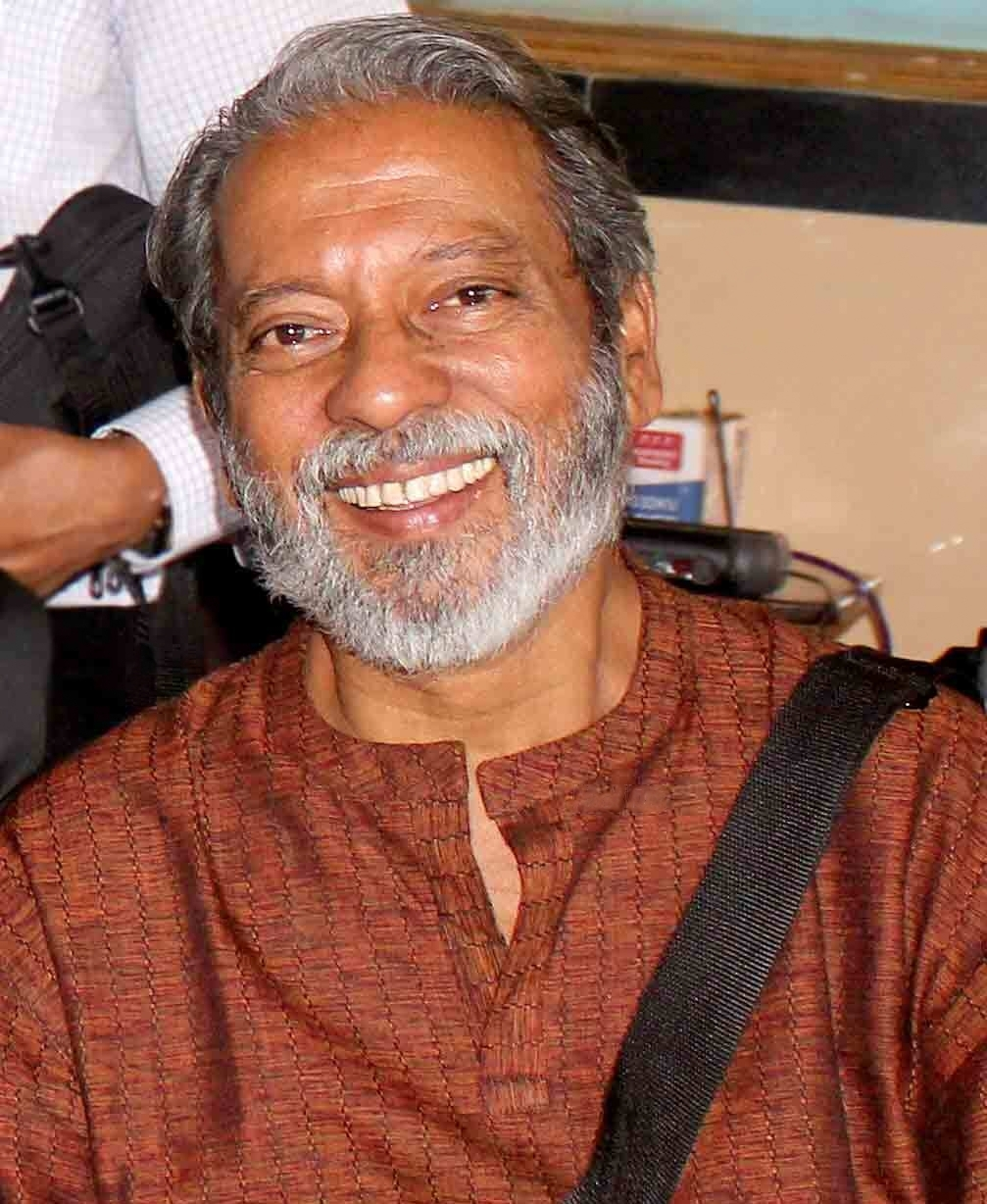
- Fernandes in 2014
- Born: Aleixo Fernandes; 24 October 1944 (age 81)
- Other names: Cartoonist Alexyz; Alexyz Fernandes
- Citizenship: India
- Education: Dr. Antonio Da Silva High School; St. Xavier's College, Bombay
- Occupation: Cartoonist
- Years active: 1974–present
- Known for: Creator of the term 'Sportoons'; First cartoonist for the newspaper O Heraldo
- Movement: Konkani language agitation
- Spouse: Tecla Fernandes
- Website: alexyztoons.com Archived 2013-12-19 at the Wayback Machine

Alex Raphael "Alexyz" Fernandes (born Aleixo Fernandes; 24 October 1944), known mononymously as Alexyz, is an Indian cartoonist, former footballer, and adman based in Siolim, Goa. He initially gained prominence working for O Heraldo during the height of the Konkani language agitation and Goa's statehood struggle in the 1980s. Over the course of a career spanning more than five decades in cartooning, he has created over 40,000 cartoons, with his first one made for the Wadala parish magazine. He is the recipient of the Goa State Cultural Award, the state's highest art and culture award.

== Early life ==
Alex Raphael Fernandes was born as Aleixo Fernandes on 24 October 1944. He hailed from the town of Siolim, Goa, then part of Portuguese India. Alexyz attended Dr. Antonio Da Silva High School in Dadar, Bombay, for his secondary education. He graduated from St. Xavier's College in Bombay in 1969, receiving a degree in Sociology and Psychology. He then completed a postgraduate degree in Advertising and Public Relations from the same college.

Alexyz always appreciated cartoons. Cartoonist Mario Miranda's work inspired him to pursue a PhD in the field of cartoons. His upbringing in Bombay exposed him to tiatr (Goan musical theatre), as his uncle often entertained guests with renditions of popular Konkani songs by Kid Boxer. His mononym "Alexyz" was chosen, based on a lead character named Alexis Zorba played by Anthony Quinn in the 1964 film Zorba the Greek.

== Career ==
=== 1980s: Football career and sports cartoons ===
Alexyz is a former footballer who participated as a member of the Bombay Juniors football team. However, he sustained a knee injury that ultimately led him to abandon his athletic career. Following this, he began creating sports-themed cartoons. He authored the book Sportoons (1982), considered India's first collection of sports-themed cartoons, marking his debut in published works. Alexyz then released his next book, Howzzat! Century of Cricket Cartoons (1987), the first collection of cricket-themed cartoons to be published in India. The inclusion of verses authored by the Australian cricketer Sir Don Bradman in this work led to its commendation by the curator of the Bradman Museum & International Cricket Hall of Fame in New South Wales, Australia. The museum currently displays three of Alexyz's artworks. Additionally, he presented an exhibition centered on cricket in Adelaide, Australia, with a special emphasis on Bradman. Alongside his published books, Alexyz was also active as a daily contributor for multiple newspapers located in Bombay, like The Indian Express, Mid-Day, The Free Press Journal, Sunday Observers, and Reader's Digest, as well as for newspapers in Goa.

=== Support by Mario Miranda and Sportoons ===
Mario Miranda was a popular cartoonist who was Alexyz's contemporary. Miranda played a significant role in supporting and mentoring Alexyz, as the latter entered the field of cartooning. Miranda started working on cartoons shortly after completing his education, contrasting Alexyz, who took a more extended period, around eight years post-graduation, to discover his own potential. Miranda was a cartoonist at The Times of India in Bombay, a location in close proximity to the college where Alexyz studied. Miranda introduced Alexyz to Khalid A. H. Ansari, the co-founder of the Bombay-based newspaper Mid-Day. Alexyz soon developed a specialty in creating sports-themed cartoons, coining the term Sportoons, which became widely adopted. Miranda also introduced Alexyz to politician Erasmo de Sequeira, who was responsible for the operations of the Goan newspaper, Goa Monitor. Alexyz later joined the West Coast Times in Margao and subsequently became the inaugural cartoonist for the Goan newspaper O Heraldo during the 1980s.

=== Late 1980s: Konkani language agitation ===
Alexyz is known for his political work during significant regional and national movements in India during the 1980s. He was recognised for his cartoons published in O Heraldo, which provided him with extensive creative freedom and space to contribute to the ongoing Konkani language agitation and Goa's statehood struggle. Under the editorship of Rajan Narayan, O Heraldo granted Alexyz a large allotment of up to 8 cartoon panels per issue. This allowed him to frequently comment on the political events and issues central to the regional autonomy and linguistic rights campaigns, through his distinctive visual style. Alexyz's cartoons were often reproduced as posters that were used to galvanize support for the agitations. Along with his daily cartoons, he also contributed work to the paper's supplementary sections.

=== Early 2000s: International exhibitions ===
In 2000, Alexyz was invited by British Member of Parliament, Keith Vaz, to organise a three-day exhibition of his cartoons at the House of Commons in London. Alexyz became the only Indian cartoonist to receive such an invitation. He also spent extended periods, over 45 days, working and exhibiting in the United States and Canada over the course of his career.

=== 2010s: Addressing of social and political issues ===
Through his work, Alexyz has addressed societal and political issues within the state of Goa. In 2015, he authored a book, O To Be In Goa... Today, dedicating it to three of his close associates: fellow cartoonist Mario Miranda, musician Emiliano da Cruz, and journalist-photographer Joel D'Souza. Many have observed that Fernandes's cartoons provide a vivid representation of the zeitgeist, and their visual nature renders them more accessible and easier to comprehend for the general public.

He thus organized a cartoon exhibition and installations in December 2015. O To Be In Goa... Today acts as a visual record of the occurrences in Goa during the period between 2013 and 2015. The exhibition, held at the Kala Academy in Panjim, Goa, featured 50 artworks. The collection included pieces that had been featured in a newspaper as well as new creations that had not been exhibited previously. Alexyz's last exhibition before this was in 2008, when he unveiled his book titled Goa, Goan, Goaing, Gone...?

=== 2019–2023: Work on autobiography and later career ===
As of December 2019, Alexyz was in the process of writing an autobiographical work, titled, 50 Funky Years of a Goan Cartoonist. He had scheduled the publication of the book to coincide with his 75th birthday in 2020. Over the course of his career, his portfolio consisted of thousands of cartoons, including his initial published piece in a parish magazine located in Wadala. For the autobiography, he intended to incorporate insights and commentary from members of the broader Goan diaspora.

In addition to his autobiography, Alexyz made artistic contributions to an updated version of Greatest Konkani Songs Volume 2, authored by Francis Rodrigues, who is based in Canada. This edition was released in December 2019 at Institute Menezes Braganza in Panjim. Despite the financial challenges often associated with a career in cartooning, Alexyz remained actively engaged in sharing his artistic talents. He continued to lead "funshops" - educational and creative workshops - for children and young aspiring artists. Alexyz firmly believed that the freedom to create cartoons was essential, stating "if there is no freedom then the fun is lost from cartooning."

=== 2024: Alexyz@80 ===
To celebrate his 80th birthday in 2024, Alexyz organised a 10-day exhibition titled Alexyz@80 at the Art Chamber-Galeria de Belas Artes in Calangute. Starting on 5 October, it featured 70 artworks by him, including his most significant ones like the Mandovi bridge collapse and those depicting his travels to other countries. The celebration also featured the screening of a documentary on Alexyz. On 13 October, World Goa Day was celebrated with Alexyz singing two songs. Further, his friends had begun digitizing his artworks and had already scanned 25,000 of them.

== Personal life ==
Alexyz was based in the city of Bombay, before returning to his ancestral hometown of Siolim in Goa in the early 1970s. Throughout his career, he maintained close personal and professional relationships with several well-known Goan artists and professionals. These included the cartoonist Mario Miranda, the musician Emiliano da Cruz, and the photojournalist Joel D'Souza. Although they worked during the same period and in the same region, Alexyz regarded Miranda as a mentor rather than a competitor. In his later years, Alexyz married a retired teacher, Tecla Fernandes, who remains active in teaching at a school close to their residence in Siolim.
