= Fortaleza de São Sebastião =

Fort in Goa, India

- Fortim Tivim
- Part of Portuguese Goa
- Tivim, Goa

Site information
- Code: IN-GA
- Owner: Government of India
- Controlled by: Portugal (1681–1961); India (1961–)
- Open to the public: Yes
- Condition: Ruins

Location
- Location of Fortaleza de São Sebastião
- Coordinates: 15.6492389°N 73.8341908°E

Site history
- Built: 1635–1681
- Built by: D. Miguel de Noronha
- Materials: Brick and Stone fort
- Demolished: Abandoned in 1841
- Battles/wars: 3

Garrison information
- Current commander: n/a
- Garrison: none
- Occupants: none

The Fortaleza de São Sebastião, also called the Tivim Fort, after the village where a part of the long wall structure was once located, is a fort that spans from the village of Tivim, to the area known as Colvale, in Goa, on the west coast of India. Currently, most of it is in ruins and barely visible. However, parts of the structure are in the process of being restored.

It is one in a series of three forts, stretching the length of the Tivim canal – which connects the Moira River to the Chapora River. The other forts are Forte de Assumpção and Forte de Meio

== History ==
This fortification was built in 1635 on the orders of the viceroy of the Estado Português da Índia, D. Miguel de Noronha, conde de Linhares. The fortifications were completed in 1681 by the Count of Alvor as a barrier to safeguard the Bardez frontier against first the Bahamanis and later the Marathas. The fortifications consisted of a canal with a high wall on its western bank which served as a moat. It also consisted of a series of guard houses at least three of which are still identifiable ruins.

In 1683, a failed invasion by the Marathas led by Sambhaji, caused some damage to the building.

In 1739, it was again occupied by the Marathas, but for two years until it was recaptured by Luís Carlos Inácio Xavier de Meneses, 1st Marquis of Louriçal. The fortification was garrisoned by Portuguese troops until they were withdrawn in 1841 when they were moved to they nearby town of Mapuça. The fortification gradually lost its strategic importance; it had for a few years been abandoned and neglected. It is now being restored under the auspices of the Directorate of Archives and Archaeology in Goa.

=== Inscription ===
On its gates, a Portuguese epigraphic inscription reads:

Reinando O Catholico Rei Dõ Fillipe XIIIX Governando Este Estado O Vigilãtissimo Dõ Miguel De Noronha Conde De Linhares Se Fez Esta Obra 1635.

"In the reign of the Catholic king Filipe XIIIX, the Governor of this State Miguel de Noronha, Count of Linhares, undertook this work. 1635."

=== Protected site ===
The ruins and site of the fort have been protected by the Government of Goa, Daman and Diu (now the Government of Goa) as a historical heritage site since 1983.

== Architecture ==
The fort shows the influence of both Portuguese and Indian architecture. During the short stay of the Marathas at this fort, they attempted to redesign some parts of the monument based on their architectural style. Though much of the fort is in ruins, its structural importance can still be comprehended.

The fortress was primarily built of brick and stone and mud and was a long wall which ran alongside the western bank of a canal. In addition, there were at least three guardhouses which contained forces to guard the area. On the exterior the fort had high walls to stop enemies from crossing into the area, known as Bardes. It is believed that the interior of the fort once had the bastions and cannons of the Portuguese rulers, but since most of the fort is ruined in the present day, very few traces of them remain to be seen.

== Chapel of Saint Michael ==
Nearby stands the Capela de São Michael which is locally called fottir meaning 'on the fort'. The chapel was founded by the Franciscans in 1591, renovated in 1678 and rebuilt in 1684 after it suffered fire damage during the failed invasion of Marathas forces under the command of Sambhaji.

== Bibliography ==
- Mendes, António Lopes. A India portugueza: breve descripção das possessões portuguezas na Ásia. Asian Educational Services, 1989. ISBN 8120604717.
- Archives Archichological http://daa.goa.gov.in
