= Oxel =

- village
- Location in Goa, India Location in India
- Coordinates: 15.633°N 73.774°E
- Country: India
- State: Goa
- District: North Goa
- Demonym: Oxelkars

Languages
  - Official: Konkani
- Time zone: UTC+5:30 (IST)
- Postal code: 403517
- Vehicle registration: GA
- Website: villagepanchayatoxel.in

Oxel is a village in Bardez sub-district, North Goa, India. The nearest airport is Mopa Airport and railway station is at Tivim. Oxel has been described as a "picturesque village" and is located in North Goa's Bardez sub-district or taluka. Oxel is a small, green and water-surrounded village. It is located approximately 25 km (16 mi) away from the State capital Panjim or Panaji. Its panchayat puts down its area to around 2.8 km^{2} (1.1 sq mi).

== Location ==
It is surrounded by the villages of Siolim on the west, Camurlim to its east, a hilly region on its south and the Chapora River to its north. Neighbouring villages include Sodiem. The Chapora river has a island on it, with mangroves and thousands of birds living in the area.

== Village size and population ==
According to the 2011 official Goa Census, Oxel spreads over 340.58 hectares, and has a population of 633 households. This comprises 2,794 people, of whom 1,329 are male and 1,465 are female. The under-six population comprises 197 children, of whom 94 are male and 103 are female.

In the area, the primary occupation is agriculture, with villagers involved in cultivating paddy (rice), cashew, coconut, mango, kokum or bin'na (Garcinia indica), vegetable and such crops. Some villagers are also fishermen, plying their canoes on the River Chapora.

== Uniqueness ==
The village has six springs, considered medicinal, in the Arradi-Khoirat stretch on the road between Dongor Marg (Siolim) to Oxel. The Khoirat spring is set amidst lush greenery behind the Holy Cross chapel. In the monsoons, the spring falls some 40 metres, appearing like a small waterfall. Some visitors have been criticised for leaving garbage behind in the area. Some three springs are now in a state of acute neglect.

The area has khazan (low-lying, reclaimed riverside) lands and a sluice-gate, ancient technology which controls the flow of water into these areas and are known locally as a manos.

== Religion, shrines ==
In the area are a church, chapels, and temples. The village celebrates the feast of Our Lady of Sea Church (at Aradi Oxel) on 1st Sunday of May, the feast of Sao Joao on June 24 and the Sangodd on June 29 annually. In addition to these local festivals, the traditional Christian festivals that form part of the religious calendar globally are also observed.

Temple festivals include the vardhapan diwas (foundation day), zatra (annual festival), Navratri utsav, Dhalotsav, shigmotsav, Tarang at Xetrapal temple (Devulwada), Kalika Panchayatan Temple (Bhati) and Mahakalika Kumbleshwar Temple (Gublavaddo). A seven-day Bhajani Saptaha at the Brahman Temple, Ram Navami at the Ram Temple Ramwada, the nine-days Bhavani Utsav at the Bhavani Temple Chouki, Divajotsav at Kamaladevi Temple, Parannath Temple are other festivals observed.

== Panchayat office ==
The Oxel village panchayat (local administration) is located at Gublavaddo, and is open from 10 am to 1 pm and from 2 pm to 5.30 pm on week-days. The Oxel Panchayat covers an area of seven wards, which form part of the Siolim (Goa Assembly constituency) and the North Goa (Lok Sabha constituency).

== Oxelkars ==
People from the village are called Oxelkars. The former MLA (member of the legislative assembly), Dayanand Mandrekar, was from the Oxel area.
