= Moreno de Souza =

Indian Jesuit priest (1923–2007)

- Born: 3 November 1923; Pilerne, Goa, Portuguese India
- Died: 14 October 2007 (aged 83); Socorro, Goa, India
- Resting place: Velha Goa, Goa, India

Moreno de Souza (Konkani: Padre Moren; 3 November 1923 – 14 October 2007) was an Indian Jesuit priest and Konkani Marian poet, Konkani writer, translator and a historian. He was one of the translators of the Povitr Pustok (the Holy Bible) in Romi Konkani.

== Early life ==
Born at his maternal house in Pilerne, Goa on 3 November 1923 to Maria Magdalena and Jeronimo de Souza, Moreno spent his early life in Marna and then Pilerne where he studied. He was born in a family that gave several priests to the Church: two of his maternal uncles, Pe. Leles de Souza and Pe. Cirilo de Souza are diocesan priests in the Archdiocese of Goa. Hard working and obedient he studied at the Institute Mater Dei in Saligão, Goa. Being persuaded by Mgr Ayres Fernandes from Siolim to write in his own mother tongue, Moreno, as a boy, began writing in Konkani.

== Priesthood ==
With the Lord's inspiration and on the advice of his maternal uncle Padre Leles de Souza, Moreno decided to become a priest and join the Jesuit order. He acknowledged later that he had not even heard of the Jesuits in his youth, but his maternal uncle Padre Leles, a diocesan priest and an acclaimed music conductor was impressed with the religious Order. Moreno entered the Jesuits on 8 November 1944.

Moreno studied for the priesthood and was ordained in Granada, Spain on 15 July 1958. As mother and family could not be present for his Ordination, he had Spanish God parents. He loved the local people, who treated him with love. He was given the name Cosmus, but he continued with the name Moreno. He took his last vows on 22 April 1978. He completed more than 50 years of priesthood at his death.

== Dor Mhoineachi Rotti ==
Dor Mhoineachi Rotti, a Konkani monthly magazine started in 1915 in Karachi, British India by Padre Vincent Lobo and dedicated to spread the devotion of the Sacred Heart of Jesus, was shifted to Bombay around 1960. In 1964, de Souza was given charge of it and he moved into the old Jesuit 'Professed house' in the then almost deserted and desolate Velha Goa in 1964. He nourished it with his love and care and edited it for around 42 years until mid-2006.

Besides he was the first person to use the term Old Goa, for Velha Goa, when he printed Old Goa as the address for the monthly in the 1960s. It led to problems in the mail services, as letters were being returned, as the postal officials did not realise it referred to Velha Goa in English. Velha Goa is the Portuguese name, which was used for more than a century. In his later years he said that he now prefers the Konkani names Adlem Gõy or Pornnem Gõi to Old Goa. Konkani was very dear to his heart.

== As a priest and writer ==
Besides staying in Bombay, Shembaganur (Tamil Nadu), Belgaum, Granada and Salamanca (both in Spain) in the course of his Jesuit formation, Moreno De'Souza was posted at various places in Goa such as the school of Bicholim, Carambolim and Alto Porvorim, besides Velha Goa. The people loved him as could be seen at his funeral. He worked dynamically in Our Lady of Grace Parish and School, Bicholim and worked among all people, besides working in other areas too.

Fr. Moreno wrote many hymns, books and articles, besides poetries. Many were Marian based. He loved the Our Lady, and was saved from near death in 1972 from a sickness with Her intercession. One of his first books was Nixkollonk Gorb Sombhovlelê on the Immaculate Conception of Our Lady. He wrote books on the history of the Churches of Goa, in parts. They include Tisvaddcheo Igorzo, Bardescheo Igorzo, Saxtticheo Igorzo- Poilo Khonnd and Saxtticheo Igorzo- Dusro Khondd. The latter was his final book, released in Cavelossim, just a month before his death.

Fr. Moreno contributed to many Konakni periodicals. After seeing the Adivasis in Ranchi composing hymns in their mother tongue, he was inspired to compose hymns in his mother tongue Konkani. His two maternal uncles were musicians, which made him take up to composing hymns, poetries and songs easily. After being ordained Fr. Moreno wrote articles for the Salesian Konkani weekly Aitarachem Vachop, Udentechem Neketr, a Konkani weekly from Bombay and Vauraddeancho Ixtt, a weekly still run from Pilar by the Society of Saint Francis Xavier, Pilar.

Fr. Moreno also translated a part of the holy Bible. He was a member of the Povitr Pustokachea Vavrachi Somiti (PPVS), which was a committee formed by the Archdiocese of Goa e Damão, for the translation of the bible. He translated Barukachem Pustok (the Book of Baruch) besides some others books.

Despite loving his mother tongue Konkani, and not being afraid and ashamed to speak and write in it, father Moreno was a linguist and knew around 10 languages. He learned Latin, Portuguese, Tamil, French, Greek, English, Castilian, Catalan, Marathi, Hindi et cetera besides knowing his mother tongue Konkani.

He translated the Bible into Konkani. (118)

Dhormik Gitam is a collection of Christian religious songs written by him and published twenty years after he became a priest. His inspiration to compose hymns stemmed from his travels to other countries, where he encountered hymns in various languages. He followed the 18th-century tradition of complementing Konkani words in hymns with Sanskrit words.

== Death and funeral ==
After lying in hospital for around 10 days, Fr. Moreno died and was brought to the Jesuit Borea Jezuchi Basilika (Basilica de Bom Jesus) in Velha Goa. His funeral mass was concelebrated by numerous priests from the Jesuit community, diocesan priests and others. In the absence of the Archbishop of Goa e Damão Dom Filipe Neri Ferrão, who had visited Fr. Moreno a few days earlier in hospital, the main celebrant was the Archbishop Emeritus of Goa e Damão, Dom Raul Nicolau Gonsalves. His body is buried in the kopelmar of the Cathedral cemetery in Velha Goa.
