= Vagator Beach =

Beach in Goa, India

- Beach
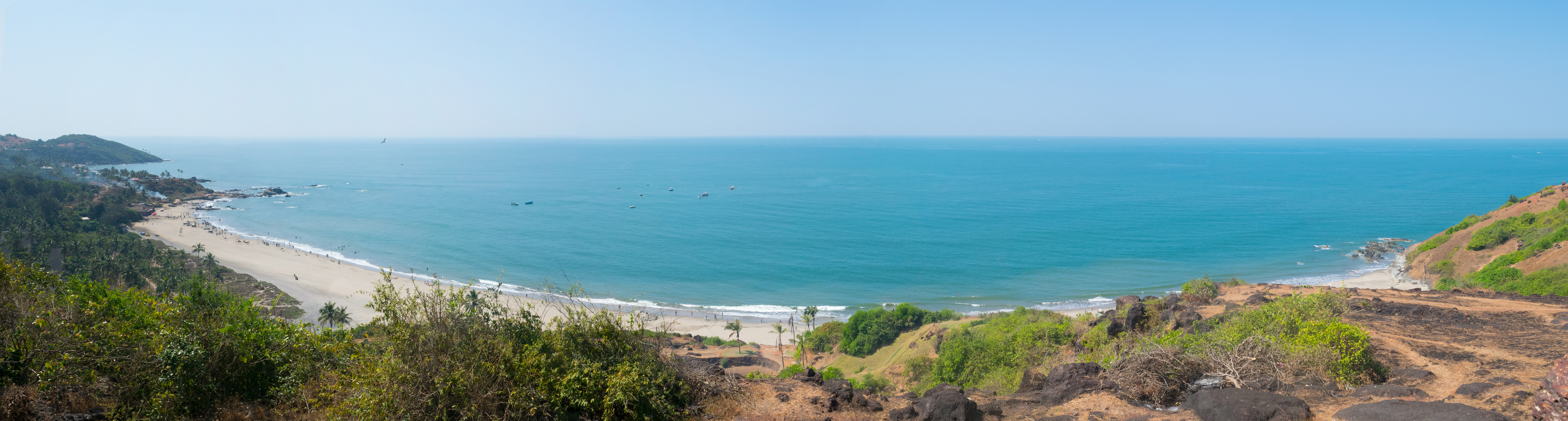
- A panoramic view of Vagator beach from Fort Chapora

- Location within Goa
- Coordinates: 15°36′09″N 73°44′01″E

Vagator Beach a beach in Bardez Taluka, in the state of Goa, India. It is located across the Chapora River from the town of Morjim.

== Description ==
Vagator Beach has black rock cliffs overlooking the water. The beach was rated one of cleanest in Goa.

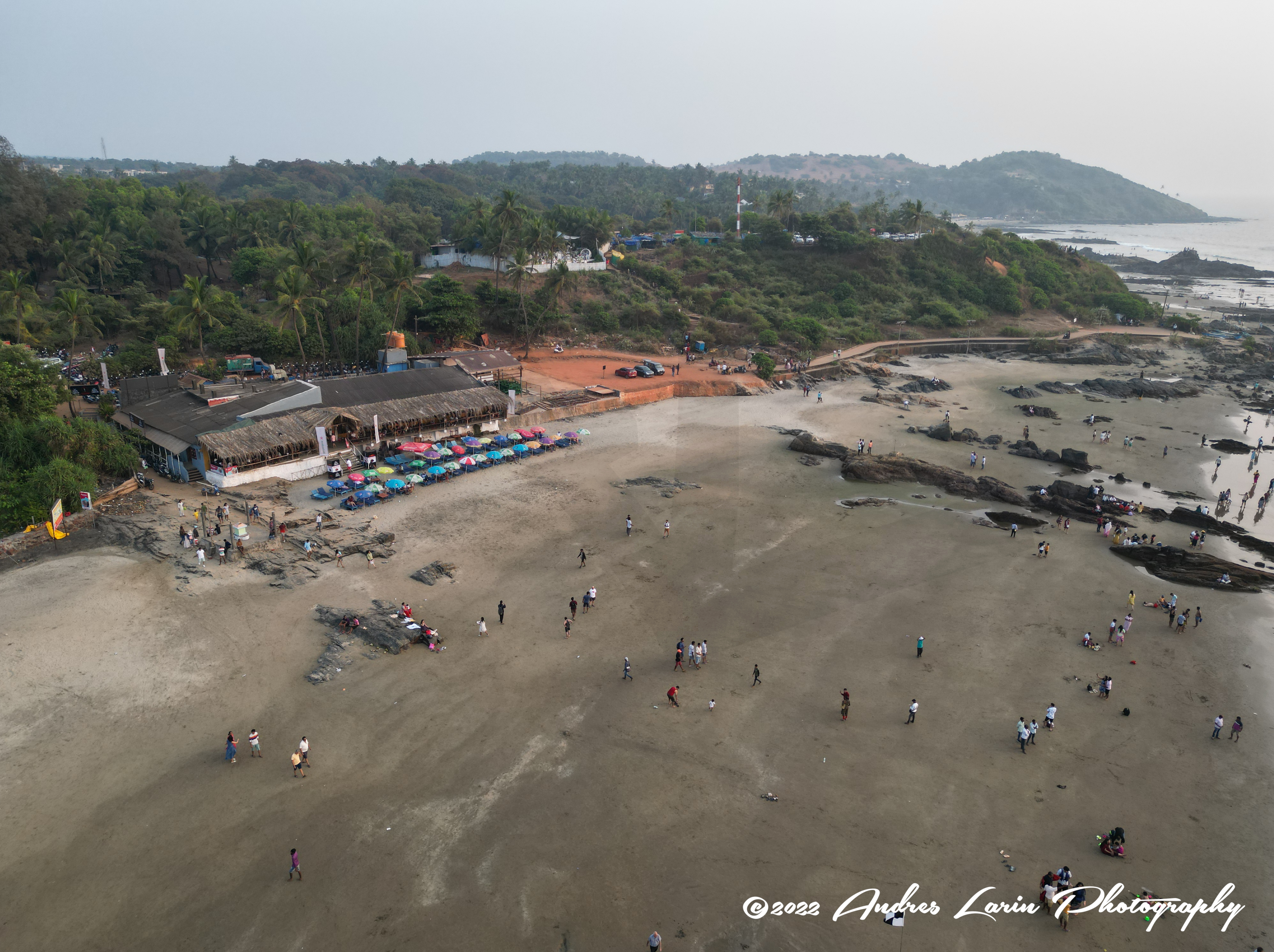
Drone shot of a Vagator Beach in 2023

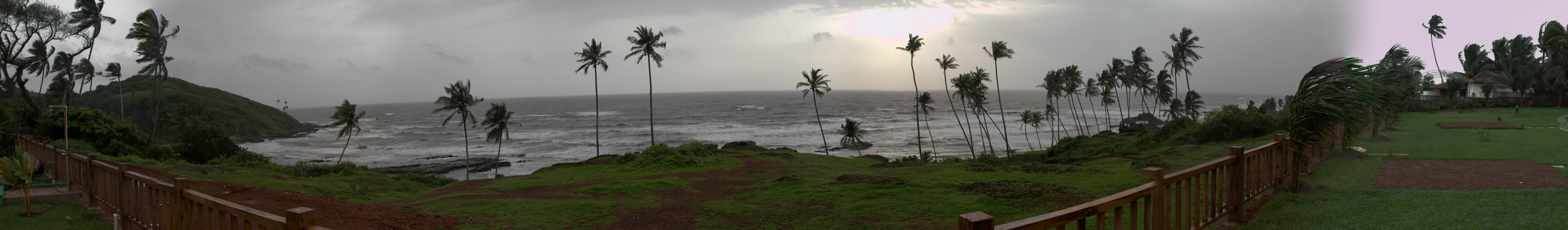
Vagator beach Goa 180 Panorama

Vagator Beach is split into three main beaches by a seaside headland which holds the car park and many stalls selling trinkets, clothes, soft drinks and snacks.

== Nearest towns ==
The nearest towns to the beach are Anjuna, Mapusa, Chapora, and Tivim.

== Rave and trance culture ==
Along with Anjuna, Vagator is closely associated with rave and trance culture.
