= Ambrosia Organic Farms =

Indian organic food company

Ambrosia Organic Farms is an Indian organic food and farming company based in Goa. It is one of India's first organic companies, being established in 1993.

The company has over 4000 employees across India.

== History ==
In 1978, London-based David Gower moved to Goa, India and was so impressed by the culture, he began a 5-acre organic farm in Siolim. Ambrosia Organic Farm was officially established in 1993. He began growing vegetables and fruits such as tomatoes and capsicums, and supplied to nearby restaurants. As his produce was used in salads, he became known as 'saladbaba'.

David later met a 16-year-old boy Janardan Khorate. He adopted Khorate and transferred ownership of Ambrosia to him 2008. Khorate is also known as John and now popularly known as Saladbaba. Since he took control, Ambrosia Organic Farm has grown significantly and is now a business worth Rs 40 crores after beginning with just Rs 10 lakhs.

With Ambrosia, Janardan Khorate runs two schools at the Maharashtra-Goa border. 20% of Ambrosia's revenue goes to the childrens' educations.
