= SFX High School, Goa =

Coordinates: 15.6218492033249°N 73.76910739835245°E

St. Francis Xavier's High School
- SFX School

Location
- Siolim; Bardez, Goa; India

Information
- School type: Private
- Religious affiliation: Catholic
- Established: 1937
- Founder: Mr Miguel Antonio de Souza
- Faculty: Local
- Gender: Co-Educational
- Classes: Class Nursery – 10th
- Language: English
- Campus: Urban

St. Francis Xavier's High School (SFX) is a school in Siolim, Bardez, Goa.

== History ==
St. Francis Xavier's High School was founded on 21 May 1937 by Mr Miguel Antonio de Souza in Corlim, Mapusa.

The Siolim Fransalian Education Society of the Missionaries of St. Francis de Sales (MSFS) manage the school.

In May 1950, Mr Miguel Antonio de Souza brought his school from Mapusa to Bamonvaddo, Siolim and set it up in a large private house. The house stood in the present premises of the school until 1986.

Mr Souza was the Principal and also taught English and Mathematics. His wife, Mrs Lourdes Sanches de Souza, was the Portuguese language teacher, in charge of preparing the students for the 3rd grade examination of Portuguese, the official language of Goa at that time.

As Mr Souza's health became worse, it was his wish that someday after his demise the SFX School should be donated to the Archdiocese of Goa.

After his demise, his son Francisco Sanches de Souza was appointed temporarily as the Principal and in December 1953, SFX School was handed over to the Archdiocese of Goa by the founder's wife.

The Patriarch of the East Indies, Don. Jose Alvernaz, appointed Rev. Fr. Catarino Roberto Fernandes, of Bamonvaddo, Siolim, as the principal, and on 1 June 1965, the Bishop Raul Gonsalves, the Patriarch of the East Indies, asked Fr. Roberto through the Diocesan Director of schools, Mgr. Filipe Neri Mendonca, to hand over the SFX to the Missionaries of St. Francis de Sales (MSFS) or “Fransalians”, and Fr. Anthony S. Fernandes was appointed as the principal. The Higher Secondary School for Arts and Commerce was started on 19 June 1988 and Science was added on 1 June 1989.

== Golden Jubilee 1937–1987 ==
The Golden Jubilee Year of St. Francis Xavier's High School was inaugurated on 6 July 1987. Fr. Arminz Nazareth, MSFS, acting provincial of the Missionaries of St Francis de Sales, Maharashtra-Goa Province, presided over the inaugural ceremony.

The celebrations coincided with the 150th anniversary celebrations of the Foundation of the Congregation of Missionaries of St. Francis de Sales (MSFS).

== Seventy years of SFX High School - 1937-2007 ==
At Bamonvaddo, Siolim, several attempts were made to run an English medium school for the education of the local youth. Fr. Lyon began St. Joseph's High School at Bamon Vaddo but it was transferred later to Arpora. Mr. Lucas of Bamonvaddo tried to continue the school for sometime but it died out with him. Mr Aleixo Joao Carvalho – father of Rev. Fr. Samson Joao Carvalho – conducted a private school in his own house at Bamonvaddo for several years, but had to shut it down for lack of continuity. Mr. Sadashiv Dessai also attempted running a school in his own house, but later he transferred it to Mapusa.

In 1965, the Fransalians (Missionaries of St. Francis de Sales) took over the school. Fr. Anthony S. Fernandes, MSFS, as Principal and Fr. P.J.Mendes, MSFS, were the first Missionaries who took charge at SFX. Succeeding Principals were Fr. Vincent Fernandes, MSFS (1966), Fr. K. Joseph, MSFS (1967), Fr. Archiebald Fernandes, MSFS (1972), Fr. P.M. Joseph, MSFS (1979), Fr. Felix I. Mendes, MSFS (19829, and Fr. V.D. Joseph, MSFS (1987), Fr. Anthony Lopes, MSFS (1991), Fr Salvador Fernandes, MSFS (1994), Fr. Joseph Pottemmel, MSFS (1994) and Fr. Sunny Joseph (2000).

The foundation-stone of the new building was laid by the Auxiliary Bishop of Goa, Mgr. Raul Gonsalves, on 3 December 1969. For the next 14 years Bro. Anthony D’Souza, MSFS, supervised the construction work until he handed over his work to Bro. Gregory Botelho, MSFS, in 1984.

Apart from Siolim, students from Mandrem, Arambol, Carmorlim and Kherim attend SFX. The total strength stands close to 2,000 with 25 divisions in the entire school.
