= Mandovi bridge collapse =

1986 failure of Mandovi bridge, Goa

On 5 July 1986, a section of the first Mandovi Bridge, a road bridge built over the Mandovi River in Goa, India, collapsed. The incident resulted in the deaths of several individuals and led to public concern over bridge safety and construction practices in the region.

== Background ==
The first Mandovi bridge was constructed in the 1970s and opened to the public in July 1971. It was intended to facilitate direct vehicular movement between Panjim and Porvorim, reducing dependence on ferry services. The bridge was built using pre-stressed cantilever segmental concrete technology. It had a total length of 600 metres and was constructed by the German company, Ferrocement. It was among the first of its kind in India.

== Collapse ==
On 5 July 1986, a section of the bridge collapsed without warning. The incident occurred during routine traffic movement, and several vehicles were on the bridge at the time. Official reports indicate that eight lives were lost in the incident, although unofficial estimates suggest that the number may have been higher.

== Causes ==
Subsequent investigations revealed that the collapse was likely due to corrosion in the pre-stressing cables. This corrosion weakened the structural integrity of the bridge and compromised its load-bearing capacity. Experts also pointed to inadequate maintenance and flaws in construction techniques as contributing factors. In particular, the lack of proper waterproofing and exposure of cables to moisture were found to be significant concerns.

== Aftermath ==
Following the collapse, vehicular traffic was immediately suspended, and the remaining section of the bridge was dismantled. Temporary ferry services were resumed to ensure connectivity between the north and south banks of the Mandovi River.

A second bridge, originally under construction at the time of the collapse, was completed and opened to the public in 1998. Known as the new Mandovi bridge, it was constructed using different engineering principles. A third bridge, named the Atal Setu, was inaugurated in 2019 to supplement traffic flow and improve regional connectivity.

== Legacy ==
The 1986 Mandovi bridge collapse raised concerns about the safety of civil infrastructure in Goa. It served as a case study in bridge engineering failures and highlighted the need for routine inspection, monitoring, and timely maintenance of public structures. The incident also influenced engineering protocols and material choices for subsequent bridges in the state.
