= Tivim =

- village
- Location of Tivim in Goa Tivim (India)
- Coordinates: 15°36′0″N 73°48′0″E
- Country: India
- State: Goa
- District: North Goa
- Sub-district: Bardez
- Established: late 1500s
- Elevation: 23 m (75 ft)
- Time zone: UTC+5:30 (IST)
- Vehicle registration: GA
- Coastline: 0 kilometres (0 mi)
- Website: goa.gov.in

Tivim pronounced Thivim, is a village in Nathivim in Bardez, in the North Goa district of Goa, India. It is an important gateway into North Goa as the home to the major railway station in North Goa. Tivim was also the ancestral village of the first global beauty queen of India, Reita Faria. More recently Prathamesh Maulingkar was crowned Mister Supranational 2018. .

== Location ==
Tivim is near Mapusa. The Tivim Railway Station at Tivim falls under the jurisdiction of the Konkan Railway.

== History ==
Tivim is a medieval village. Oral tradition suggests that the villagers had close ties with the villages of Siolim, Cunchelim and Parra, as well as the market town of Mapusa.

The 1802 the British returned to Goa because they expected a French invasion. They established Goans into several battalions and Tivim Fort became part of the territory's defences. This became more important after Napoleon invaded Portugal in 1807 forcing the Portuguese king and court to flee to Rio De Janeiro. The British withdrew from Goa in 1813.

Writing in 1831 the French priest Rev. Denis L Cottineau regarded Tivim as one of the thirty-six villages and twenty-six parishes of Bardes. In 1834 the forts at Tivim were abandoned In 1878 the population of Tivim was estimated at around 6000 and the village had a school.

=== Church ===
In 1623 the Church of St Christopher (São Cristovão) was built in Tivim by the villagers of Tivim, Sirsaim and Assonora.

=== Fortresses ===
A fortress was constructed at Tivim in 1635 by the fourth Count of Linhares. An inscription on its gate reads: "Reinando O Catholico Rei D. Fillipe 3° governance este Estado o vigilantissimo D. Miguel de Noronha, Conde de Linhares, for feat established obra no anno de 1635". This Fortress was called Forte Novo de Tivim. In the same village two auxiliary forts were raised by Francisco de Távora the Count of Alvôr, respectively named Forte de Assumpção and Forte de Meio, which were connected with one another and the one at what is now Colvale (Fortaleza de São Sebastião) by a strong wall protected by a deep ditch. These two forts were taken by Sambhaji in 1683 who retained them for a short time. Sambhaji also destroyed the church of St. Christopher, which was subsequently rebuilt.

== Prominent institutions ==
Some of the prominent institutions in the village are the local church, St Christopher, and the local schools of St. Anne's near the church and the nearby St Clara's, near Assonora.

It is known for its football ground, by the main road alongside St Anne's school. One prominent historical site the Colvale Fort (Goa) is in the area.

== Government and politics ==
Tivim is part of Tivim (Goa Assembly constituency) and North Goa (Lok Sabha constituency).

== Tivim Train Station ==
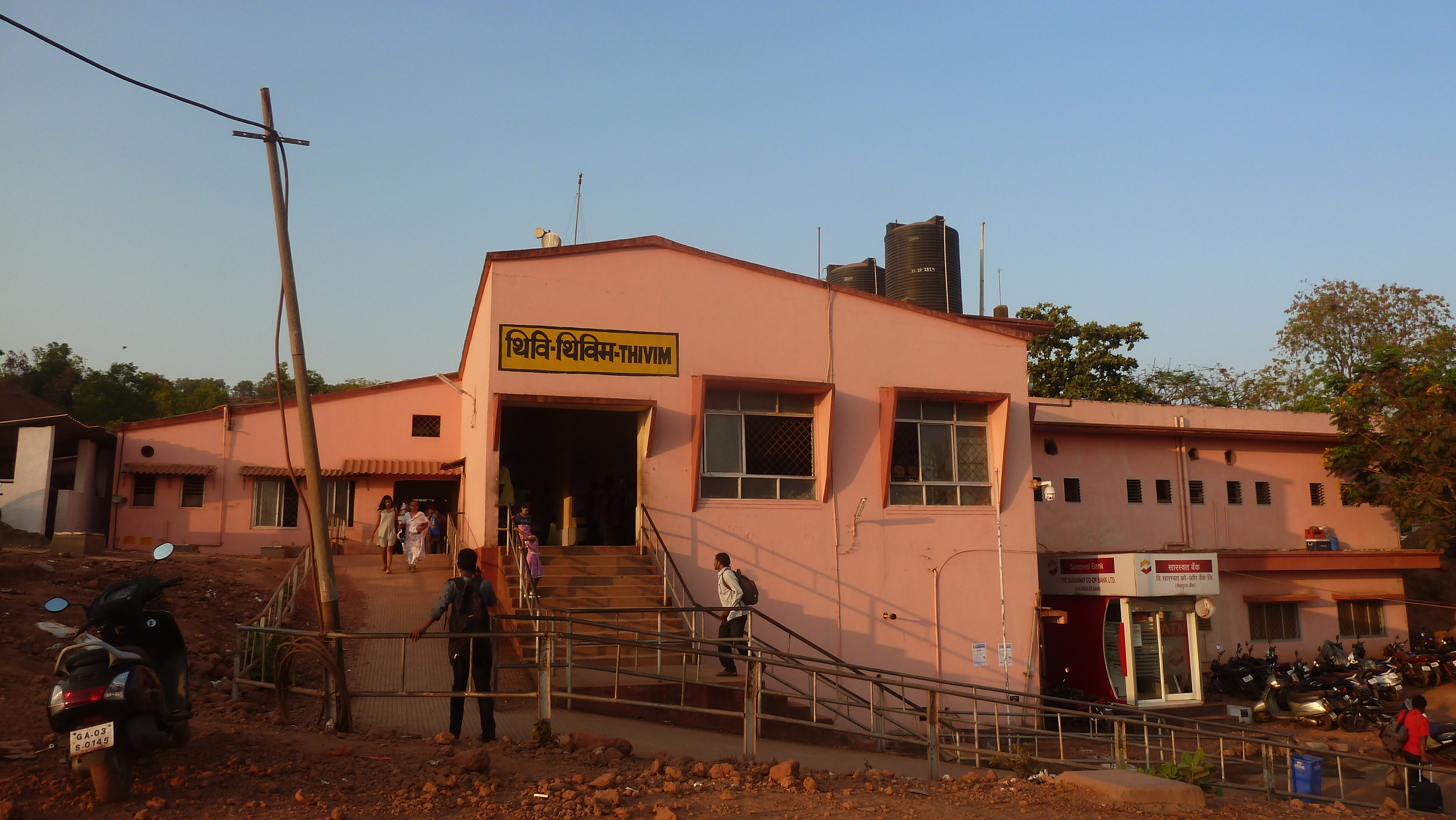
Tivim Konkan Railway Station, Goa, India

One of the main stations for North Goa can be found at Tivim (also called Thivim). It is part of the north–south line and trains from Bombay (Mumbai) and Kerala stop in this small station.

Tivim came on the rail route of India, after the building of the Konkan Railway in the 1990s.

This station lies at an elevation of 23 m above sea level, and is part of the Konkan Railway/Konkan zone, in the division of Karwar. It is located just off the Mapusa-Bicholim road at Thivim, Bardez, North Goa.
