= Marna, Goa =

Marna
- village
- Location in Goa, India Marna (India)
- Coordinates: 15°37′21.792″N 73°48′37.176″E
- Country: India
- State: Goa
- District: North Goa

Government
  - Body: Panchayat (shared with Siolim)

Languages
  - Official: Konkani
- Time zone: UTC+5:30 (IST)
- PIN: 403517
- Telephone code: 0832
- Vehicle registration: GA
- Nearest city: Mapusa
- Vidhan Sabha constituency: Siolim
- Website: www.vpsiolimmarna.com

Marna is a village in Bardez taluk or sub-district in North Goa District of Goa State, India.

== Location and panchayat ==
It is located in Siolim, and Siolim-Marna is one of the three village panchayats in the Siolim area.

== Area, population ==
Marna has an area of 328.94 hectares, and a total of 298 households. It has 1234 residents, of these 569 are men and 665 are women. In the zero-to-six age group, it has a population of 100 children, 47 boys and 53 girls.

== Local services ==
The Goa-based non-profit organisation, the Indian Students Educational Aid Foundation (ISEAF) has a home nursing bureau, that is located at the Holy Cross Indo-German Techno Centre, in Marna. It launched a mobile nursing service in March 2018, to serve home-bound patients. It offered services such as the dressing of wounds, bladder wash, IV medication, home dialysis, nebulization, enema and the like.
