= Chapora Fort =

Fort in Goa, India

Chapora
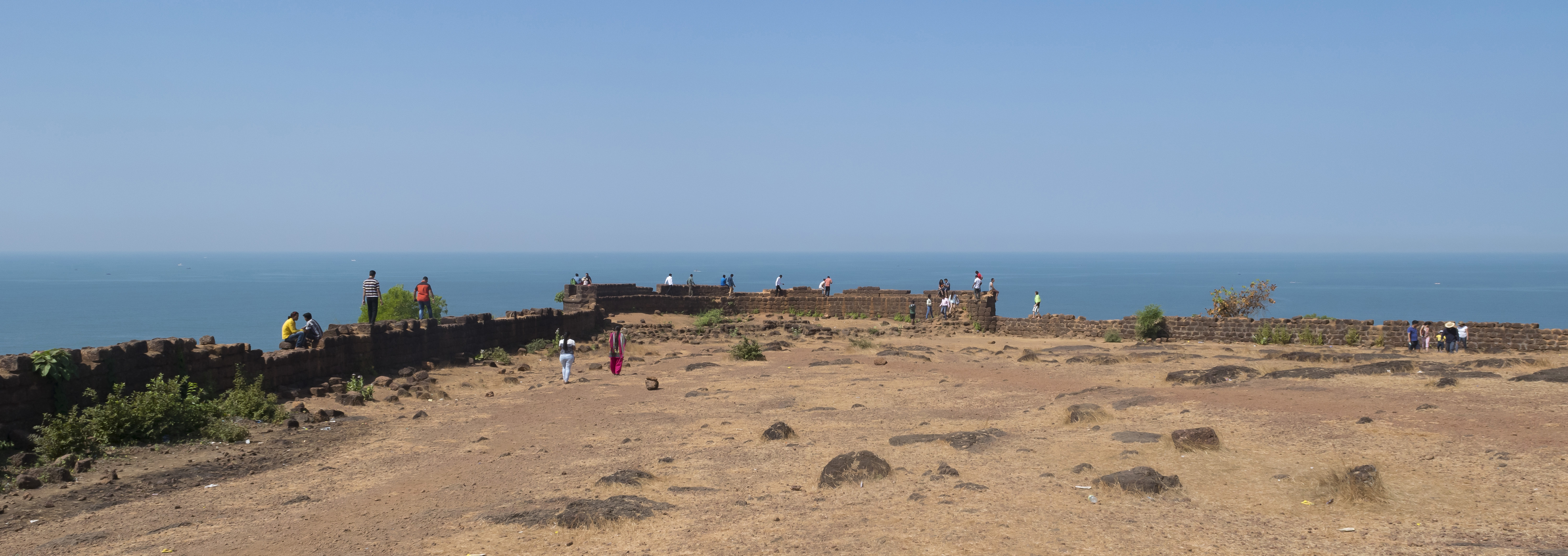
- Ruins of Fort Chapora in Goa

- Location within Goa

General information
- Location: India
- Coordinates: 15.60°N 73.76°E
- Completed: 1617; 409 years ago

Chapora Fort (Konkani pronunciation: [ʃɑːpoːɾɑː], Devanagari: शापोरा), located in Bardez, Goa, rises high above the Chapora River. The site is the location of a fort built by Adil Shahi dynasty ruler Adil Shah and called Shahpoora, whose name was altered to Shapora (chapora) by Malvankar on the request of the Portuguese. Malvankars were naval army of Shivaji, who remained in the surrounding villages. It is now a popular tourist spot and offers a view north across the Chapora River to Morjim.

== History ==
The fort changed hands several times after Portuguese acquired Bardez. Trying to end the Portuguese rule in Goa, the Marathas in 1683 and made this place his base camp. It became the northern outpost of the Old Conquests. After the Portuguese recovered from an encounter with the Marathas, they strengthened their northern defenses and provided shelter to the people there.

Across the Chapora river, the Hindu ruler of Pernem, the Maharaja of Sawantwadi who was an old enemy of the Portuguese held the fort for two years. The Portuguese came in 1717, and carried out extensive repairs of the fort, adding features like bastions and a tunnel that extended to the seashore and banks of the Chapora River for emergencies. The fort fell to Bhonsle in 1739. In 1741, the Portuguese regained the fort when the northern taluka of Pernem was handed over to them. In 1892, they completely abandoned the fort. When Goa's border moved northwards with the acquisition of Pernem as part of the New Conquests, the fort lost its military significance towards the end of the century.

== Architecture ==
The Chapora fort sits on a prominent position which commands views in all directions. It also has steep slopes on all sides. The fort follows the outline of the higher slopes. This forms an irregular outer wall that uses the natural form to add defensive height to the fortifications. This offers an advantage over dry ditches being dug. At the top of the steep approach track, the main gate is small and unpretentious, but narrow and deep. Depending on defense requirements, the positions of bastions are irregularly spaced with enormous embrasures for cannon. Each bastion has a cylindrical turret offering a special character to the fort.

Inside the fort, the church, once dedicated to St. Anthony, has disappeared and inside only a few signs exist of the barracks and housing that once filled this vast area. The wide expanse of open space is only a tumble of stones, where a few herds of goats graze and cashew bushes grow. A natural valley to the beach protected by rocky promontories provides an excellent natural access to the sea.

== In popular culture ==
The Fort of Chapora got popularized by the movie Dil Chahta Hai (Starring Amir Khan, Saif Ali Khan, and Akshaye Khanna) and is now a prime attraction of Goa.

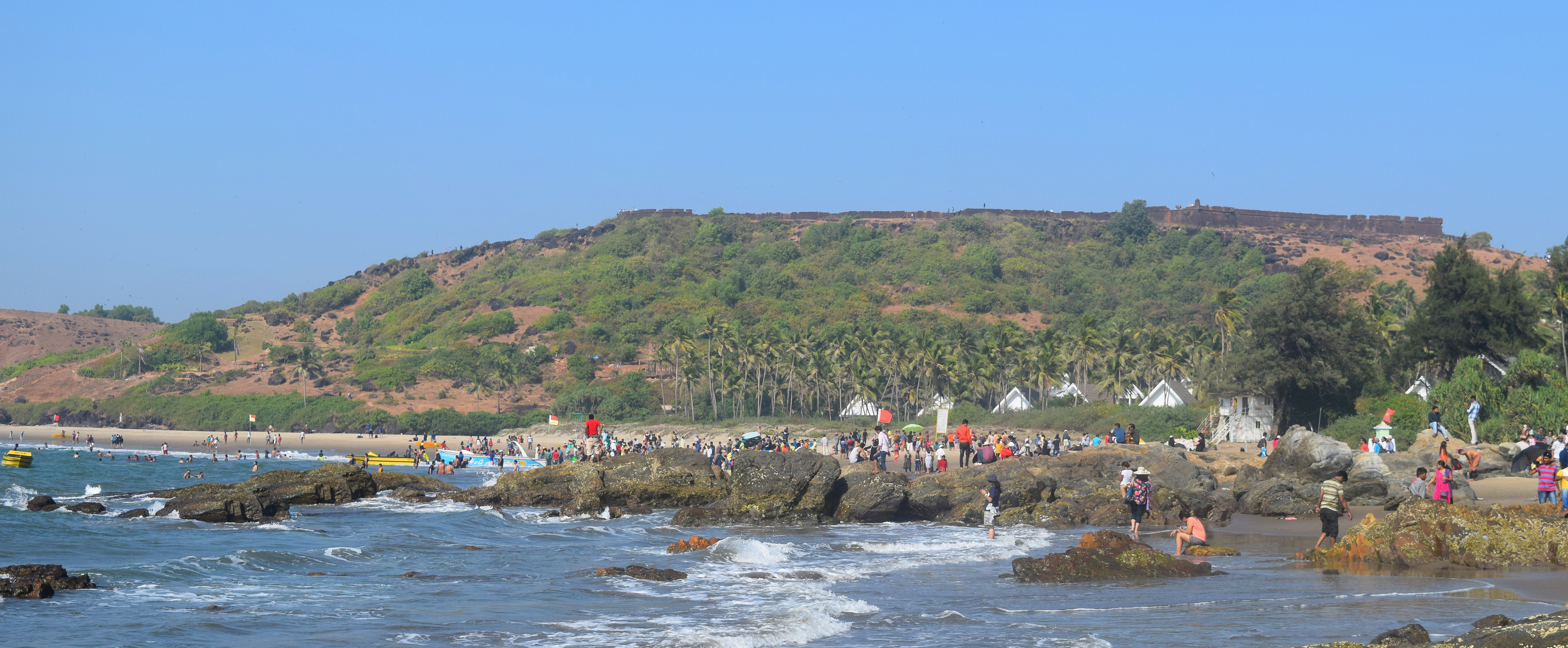
A view of Chapora Fort from Vagator Beach.

== See also ==
- Chapora (disambiguation)
