= Chapora Beach =

Village in Goa, India

Chapora
- Beach
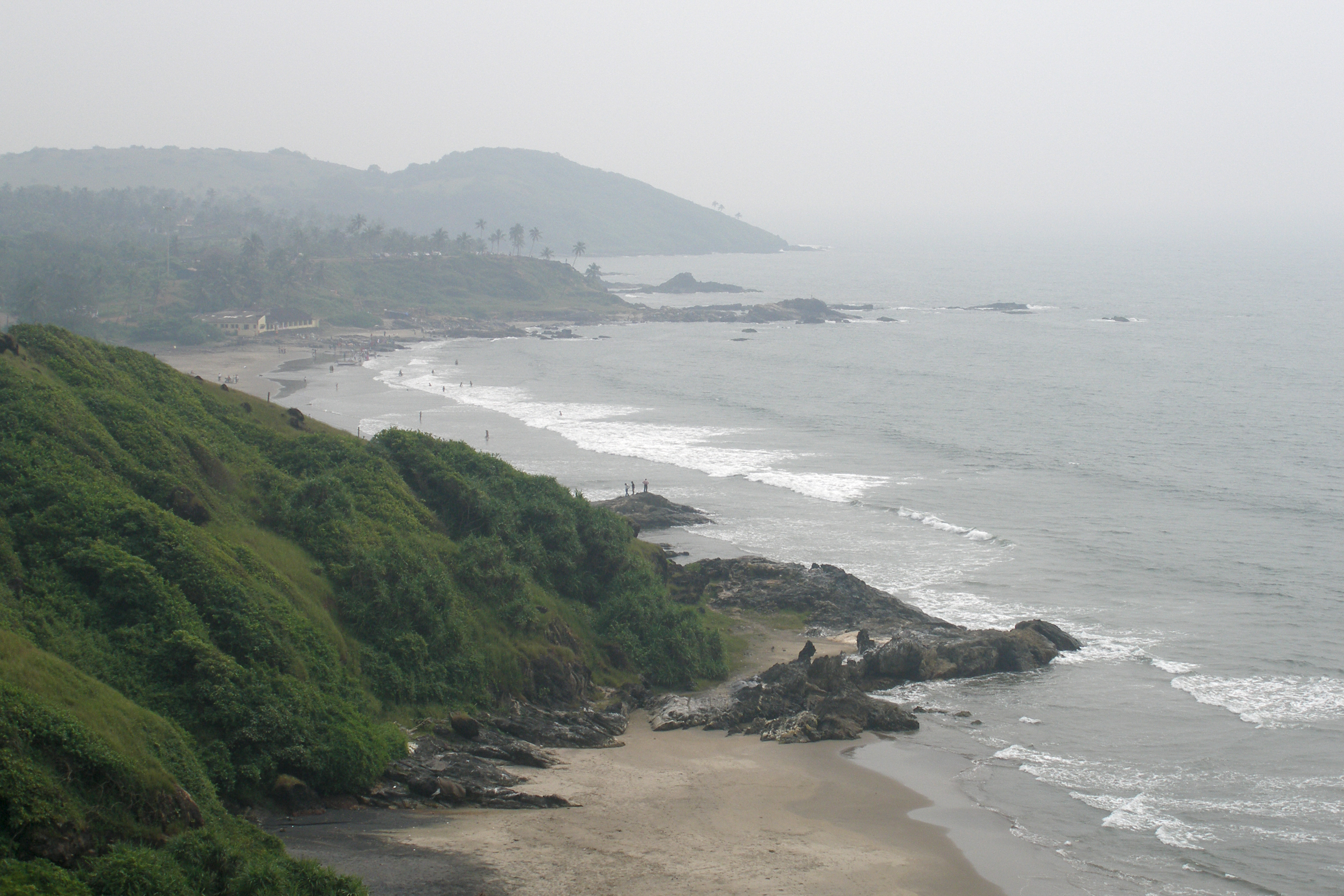

- Location within Goa Location within India
- Coordinates: 15°36′22″N 73°44′25″E

Chapora is a coastal village at Chapora River estuary lying alongside a beach stretch in North Goa that is around 10 km. from Mapusa, a City in Northern Goa. It is close to Chapora Fort, an old Adilshahi fort. Chapora is also close to a trawler-fishing jetty.

It has many Historic Churches of Holy Cross, Nossa Senhora De Nesessidade (Our Lady Of Necessities), etc.; and old Shrine belonging to Shree Siddheshwar in the Cave, close to the Chapora Jetty.
