= Chapora River =

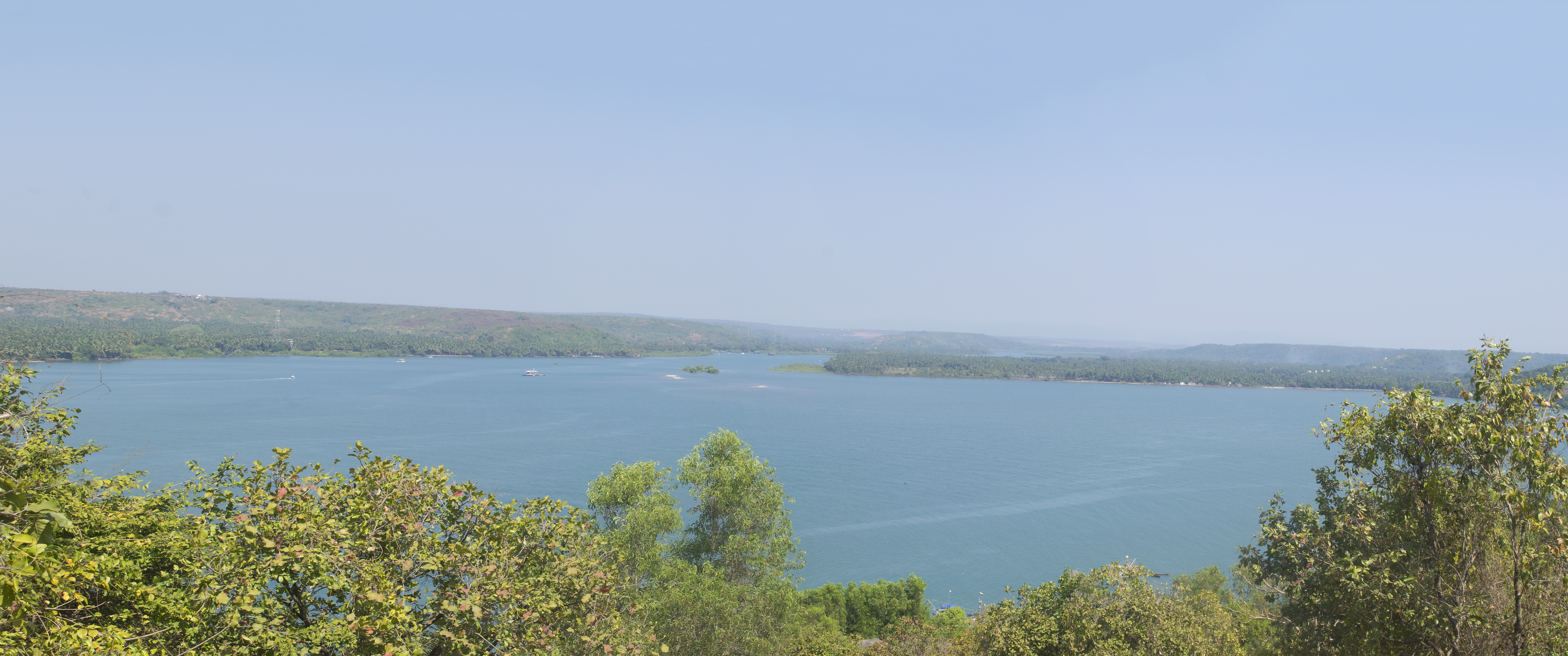
- Chapora River as seen from Chapora Fort

Location
- Country: India
- State: Goa

Physical characteristics
- Source
  - location: Maharashtra, India
- Mouth
  - location: Arabian Sea, India
- Length: 21 km (13 mi)

Basin features
- Tributaries
  - right: Tillari

Chapora River is a river in northern Goa, India. It runs westward into the Arabian Sea at Chapora and demarcates the border between the North Goa talukas of Pernem and Bardez. The river originates at Ramghat in the neighbouring state of Maharashtra enters Goa and flows into the Arabian Sea. Vagator Beach, a tourist destination, is located at the estuary to the south, and to the north is the village of Morjim. There is a bridge across Chapora from Morjim to Siolim. The tributaries of Chapora include Anjuna River and Calna River.

In the 18th century, the river marked the boundary between Portuguese Goa and India.

== See also ==
- Chapora Fort
- Chapora Beach
