= Siolim =

Census town in Goa, India

Siolim Xivoli
- Town
- São António Igreja

- Location within Goa Location within India
- Coordinates: 15.614537°N 73.770447°E
- Country: India
- State: Goa
- District: North Goa
- Taluka: Bardez
- Named for: "Xinv" means Lion and "Halli" refers to a Village

Government
  - Type: 3 Panchayats
- Elevation: 8 m (26 ft)

Population (2001)
  - Total: 10,311
- Demonym: Xivolkar or Siolcar or Shivalkar

Languages
  - Official: Konkani
  - Also Spoken (understood): English
  - Also Spoken (understood): Marathi

Religions
  - Dominant: Hinduism, Roman Catholicism
- Time zone: UTC+5:30 (IST)
- Postcode: 403 517
- Telephone code: 0832 227
- Vehicle registration: GA-03
- Website: goa.gov.in

Siolim ([ʃiwoːlĩː]) is a village in Bardez taluka, and a census town on the central west coast of India, in the North Goa district of Goa. The 2001 population was 10,311, and 10,936 in 2011. Siolim is also the name of a constituency in the Goa assembly, which includes Assagao, Anjuna and Oxel, in addition to Siolim. A person from Siolim is known as a Siolcar or even as Shivalkar (Konkani: Xivolkar).

== Location ==
Siolim is situated about 7 km (4.3 mi) from Mapusa. It is located around the Chapora River. There is a bridge over River Chapora, in place of the prior ferry.

To Siolim's north lies the quiet village of Oxel; green hillocks hedge it towards Assagao in the south and the east. Camurlim to lies to its east, and in the west flows the Chapora river with Morjim and its pine-wooded beach on the northern bank in Pernem.

== Subdivisions ==
Siolim has several different types of subdivisions, which are independent of one another. They include:

=== Vadde ===
There are nine vadde (or village wards, subdivisions -- vaddo is singular and vadde is plural). These are: Igrez-Vaddo, Gaunsa-Vaddo, Bamon-Vaddo, Marna, Dcruz-Vaddo, Costa Vaddo. Porta-Vaddo, Tarchi Bhatt, Guddem, Aframent, Vaddi and Oxel in Siolim-Marna panchayat. Besides this, there are seven vadde in Siolim-Sodiem panchayat.

=== Panchayats ===
There are three panchayats, which govern diverse areas of the village: Siolim-Marna, Siolim-Sodiem, and Siolim-Oxel.

=== Comunidades ===
There are two comunidades, which are ancient self-governing and village-agriculture promotion bodies: Siolim and Marna.

=== Parishes ===
There are three parishes in the area: Siolim, Oxel and Tropa.

== Etymology ==
The name "Siolim" is believed to have come from two words -- 'Xinv' and 'Halli' . "Xinv" (pronounced 'Shiu') means "lion" and "Halli" refers to a village or place. This probably means that there once were lions in the hills of Siolim. This origin of the name has been documented in Fr. Moreno de Souza's book. An argument in favour of this origin is that the village on the other side of the Siolim (not Marna) hill is called Vagali, which could also come from the words 'Vag' + 'Halli' ("Vag" meaning "tiger" in the local Konkani language). Another explanation is that the name comes from 'Shivalaya' , which means a temple of Shiva, but there is no documented evidence for this origin

== Churches ==
=== Church of Mae de Deus (1568-1600) ===
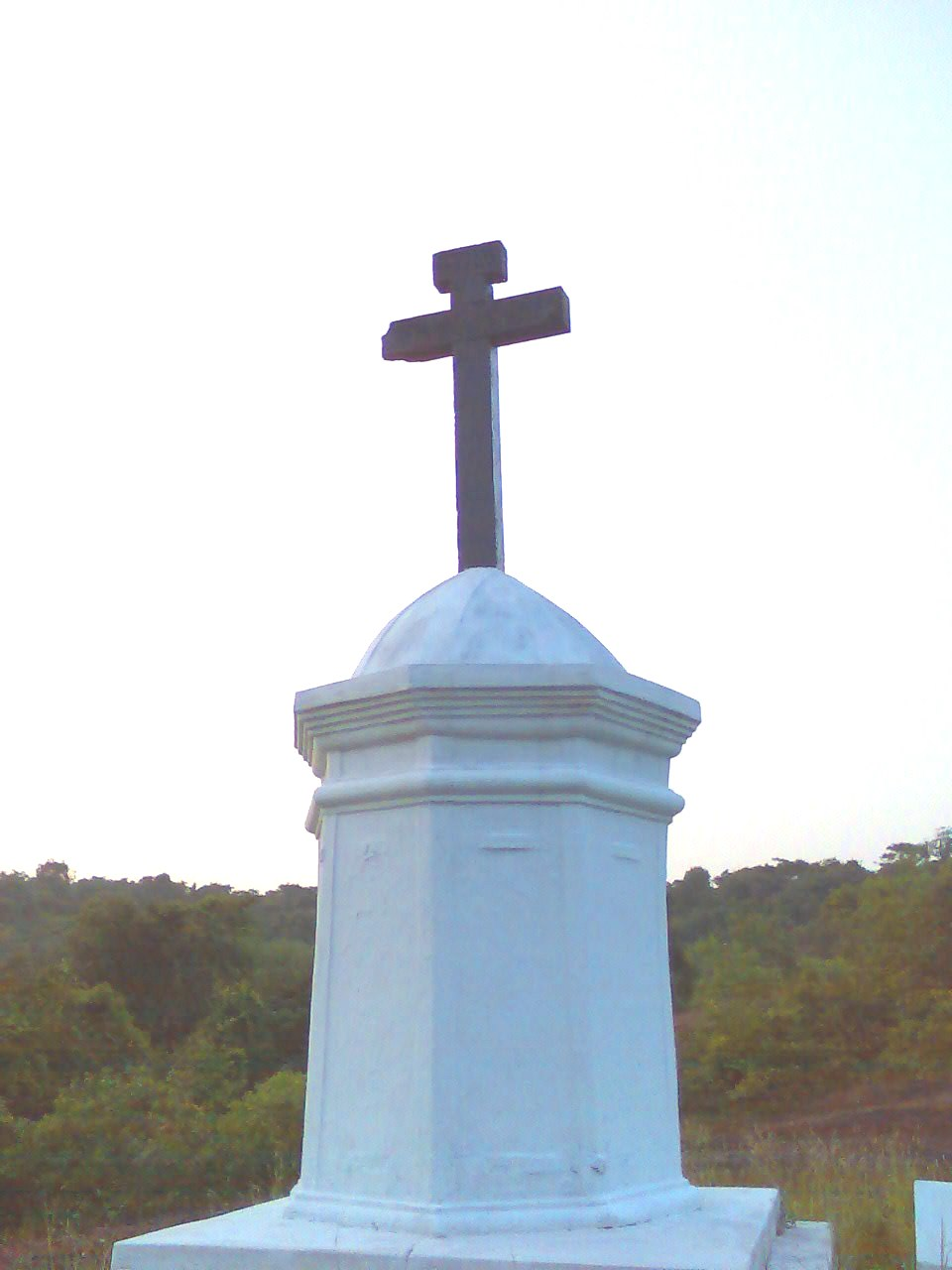
The black stone cross from the Franciscan church at Sonarkhett.

Franciscan missionaries first built a church - the Church of Mae de Deus - at the Sonarkhett hill, wedged between Siolim and Assagao. It was located centrally to serve the spiritual needs of the people in the villages of Anjuna, Assagao, Siolim and Oxel. But being situated on the rising hill and probably being a makeshift kutcha structure, it did not survive many years, leaving behind the black stone cross at Sonarkhett.

This first church in Siolim was built near the site of the Mae de Deus chapel in Gaunsa-Vaddo in 1568. There is a plaque commemorating this fact in the chapel compound. This church was probably a kutcha (temporary) structure, and it survived for merely 32 years.

The Gaunsa-Vaddo Chapel of Mae de Deus was constructed in 1847.

=== St. Anthony's Church (1630-1901) (1902-today) ===
==== Miracle ====
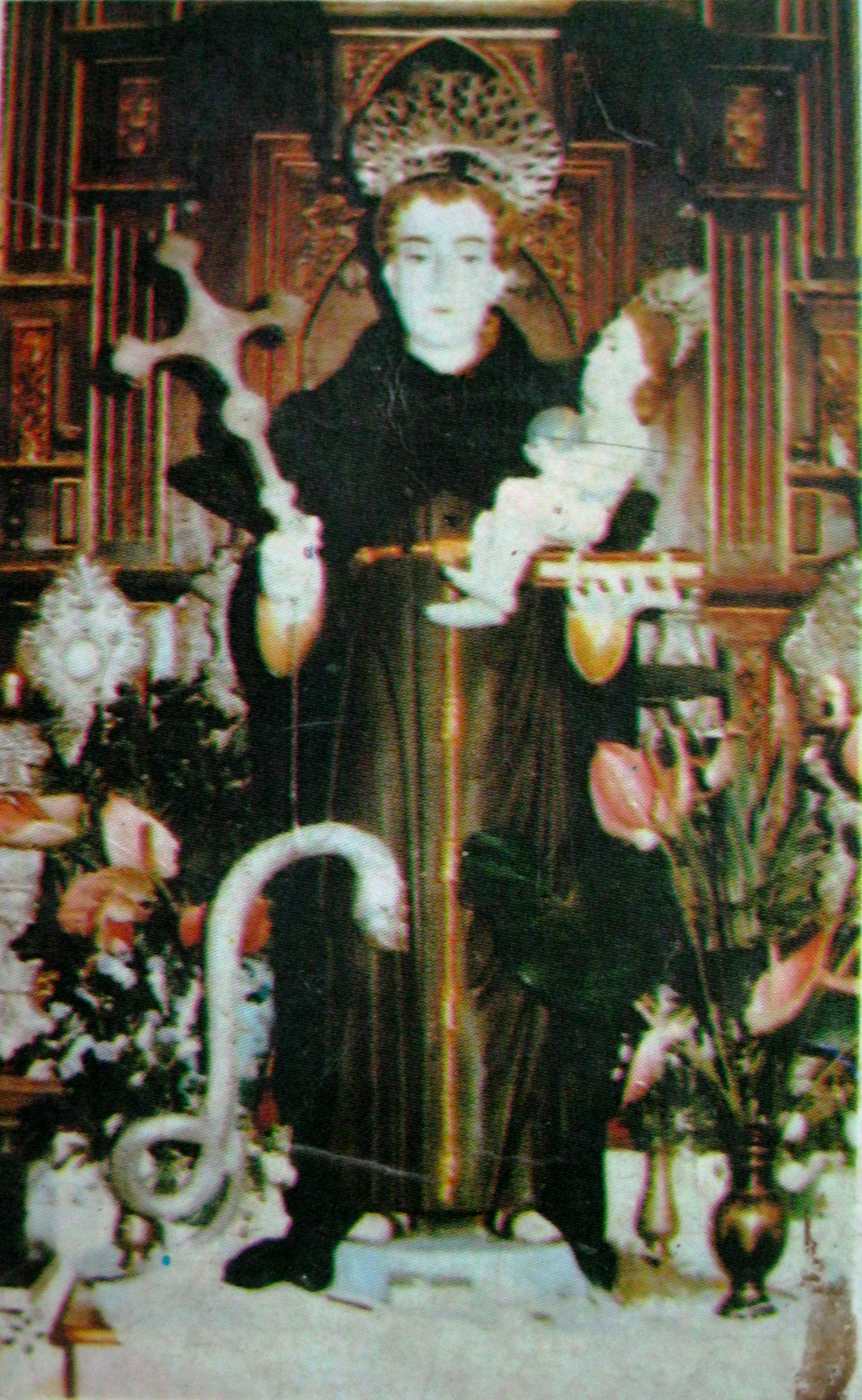
Statue of St. Anthony of Padua in the church of Siolim showing a snake caught in a cord

Siolim's church is dedicated to St. Anthony of Padua. The church possesses two steeples on the frontispiece and a statue of St Anthony holding a serpent on a leash. This depicts an incident that occurred during the construction of the church when a snake is believed to have been disrupting construction work. The people are said to have interceded with St. Anthony for help, and placed his statue at the construction site. The next morning, the snake was found caught in the cord placed in the statue's hand. In the church, the statues, paintings, and even the church bell, depict St. Anthony holding a serpent tied with a cord to commemorate this miracle.

St Anthony Church, Siolim, India

The First Church: In 1600, the missionaries planned for a new and larger church in another location more central to the Christians of Siolim. But this project is said to have been caught in doubts due to lack of funds. At that time, two Portuguese merchants were caught in a severe storm while sailing from Portugal. They had with them a statue of St. Anthony and vowed that if they made it to port safely, they would build a church where they landed.

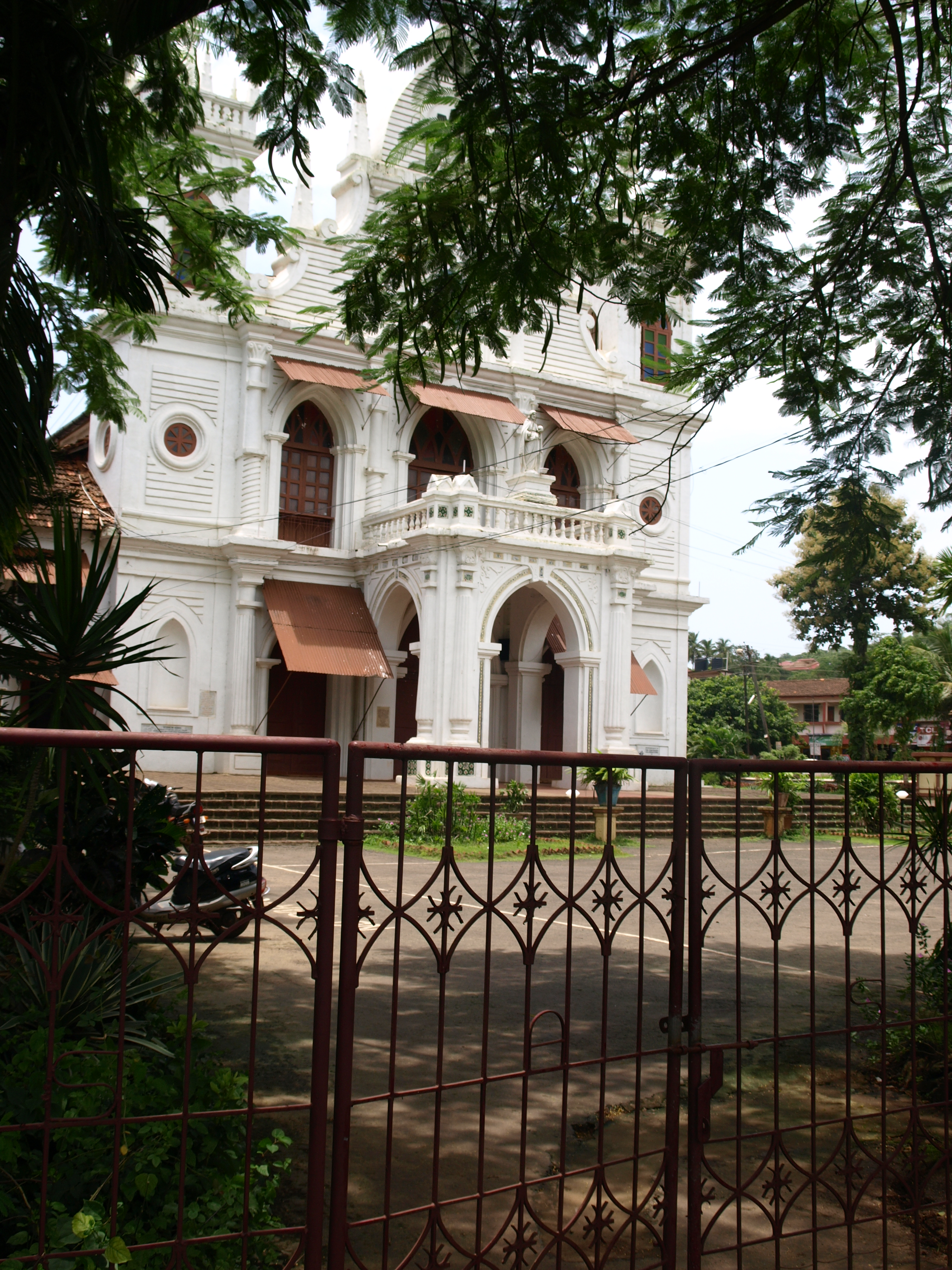
Siolim shrine in Goa.

Their ship is said to have entered the Chapora River and docked on the left bank near the village of Marna. It was here they met the Franciscan missionaries looking out for funds. The new church was dedicated to St. Anthony, instead of Mae de Deus (the Mother of God), and completed in 1630.

The Second Church: In the early part of the 20th century, the ravages of time took their toll on the first church of Saint Anthony. Attempts to repair the wall and renovate the roof appeared futile. The whole structure was in danger of collapsing. The parishioners decided to build a new church on the same site. The foundation stone of the church was laid in November 1902. Its consecration took place on 28 December 1907.

=== Our Lady of Consolation of the persecuted ===
Earlier, the local Christians would attend religious services at the Military chapel at Tropa, which was raised to a Church in 1971. During Portuguese rule, this place was well-fortified by the Portuguese with police to ward off the Bhosle attacks. The word tropa which means 'military troops', still survives in the name given to Tropa parish. Its church is dedicated to Our Lady of Consolation of the Persecuted.

=== Our Lady Of The Sea Church ===
The church at Oxel-Siolim dedicated to Our Lady Of The Sea.

== Chapels ==
- Mae de Deus Chapel:
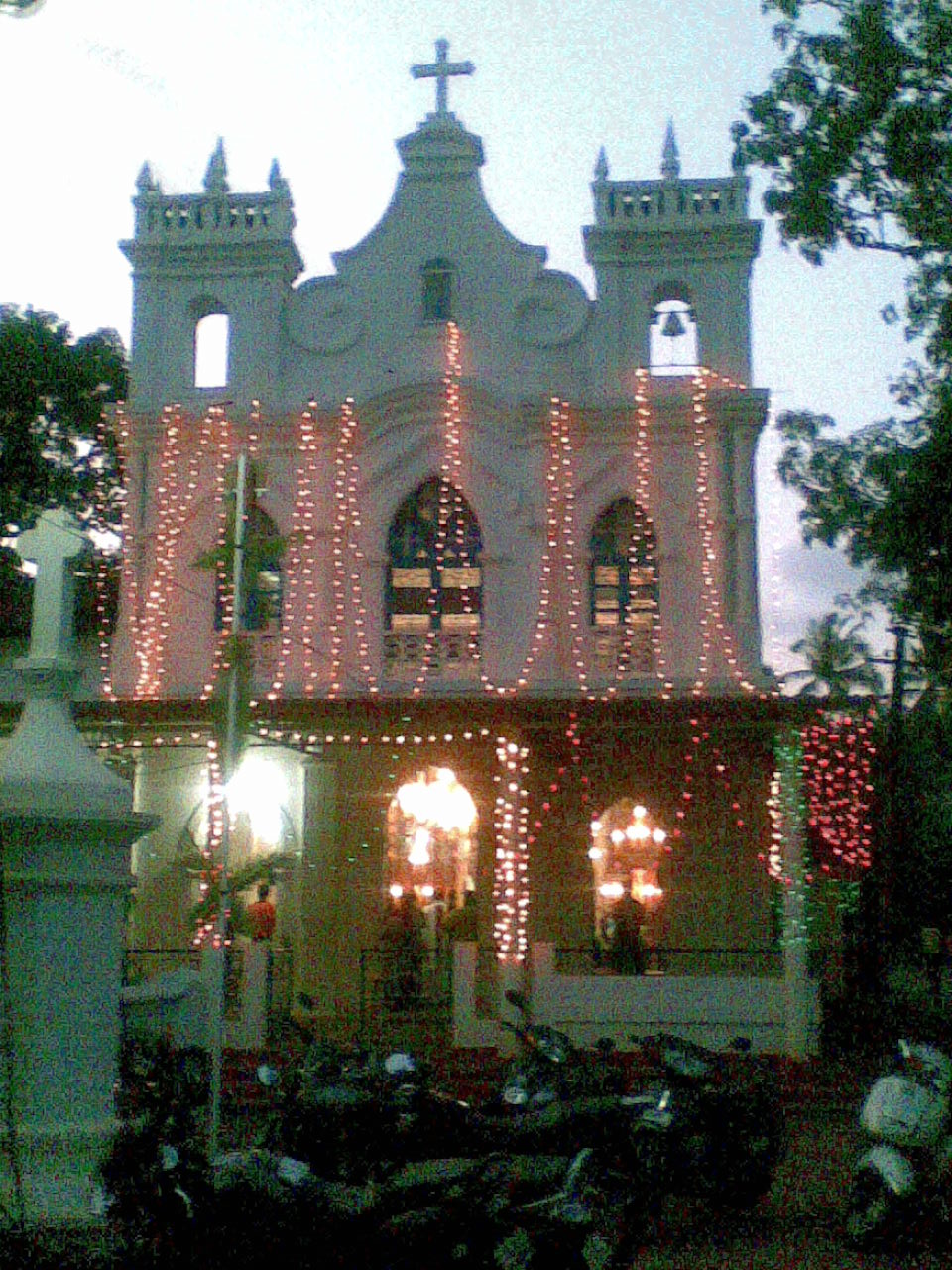
  The chapel of Our Lady of Sorrows lit up for the feast.
  Located in Gaunsa-Vaddo, Siolim, opposite Holy Cross Convent. It is built near the site of the ruined Mae de Deus church. Constructed in 1847, the chapel feast takes place on the first Sunday of May.
- St. Sebastian Chapel: at Marna.
- Nossa Senhora de Piedade Chapel: in Vaddy.
- Vailankani Chapel: in Bamon-Vaddo.
- St. Joao Chapel: in Fernandes-Vaddo / Bamon-Vaddo.
- Fernandes-Vaddo Chapel: located in Fernandes-Vaddo.
- Gudddem Chapel

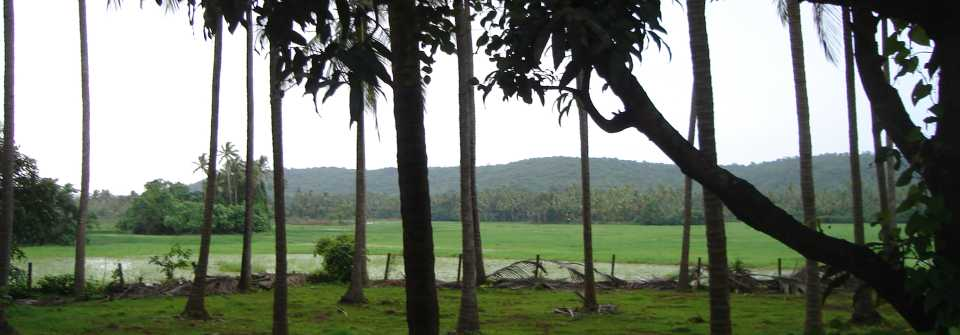
Village scene by the roadside in Siolim, Goa

* Our Lady of Sorrows (Nossa Senhora das An-gustias) Chapel: Located in Porta -Vaddo, Siolim, on the bend of the road leading to the Siolim-Chopdem-Morjim bridge. The chapel feast is on the Second Sunday of May.

- Holy Cross Chapel: located in Tarchi Bhatt.
- Martyrs Chapel (Matti kopel): Located uphill on Modlem Bhat, Feast celebrated on 29 December, way of the cross in Lent.

== Temples ==
- Shri Datta Mandir: Developed and designed by architect Nandan Sawant. Dedicated to Shri Dattatreya, the trinity, known for its serenity austere rites. The deity worshipped is Ekhmukhi which is considered sacred and rare. Located at Ghol Marna Siolim, away from traffic and human settlements. A huge mandam has been built in front of the temple. Festivals there include Gurupadwa, Vardhapan Divas (foundation day), Gurudwadshi, and Dattajayanti, among others. This temple was established by Kai. Gopinath Dattaram Prabhu (Porob) (1900–49), a Marathi immigrant born poor and religious from a young age. His father died when he was 20. He went to Narsobaa-Vaddi to perform the required rites. Influenced by Lord Dattatreya, he loved visiting Narsoba-Vaddi. He later resided there and occupied himself in worshipping Lord Dattatreya. At 31, he established a portrait of Lord Dattatreya at Mapusa. He then established a temple. After a few months, he came to be Kai Atmaram Fulari's resident. There, he would bathe near the spring at Ghol Marna. It was set amidst nature, thick forest, tall coconut trees, medicinal water emerging from springs, and hills on all sides. In 1942 he sought the owner's, Visnum Ranga Kamat Dalal, permission and built a small hut where he started worshipping a portrait of Lord Dattatreya. Devotees started visiting this place. Festivals like Gurudwadashi, Dattajayanti, and Gurupadwa were celebrated. He got known as Baba Maharaj. After his death, his samadhi was constructed in front of the temple. Shreepad Fulari continued the worship.

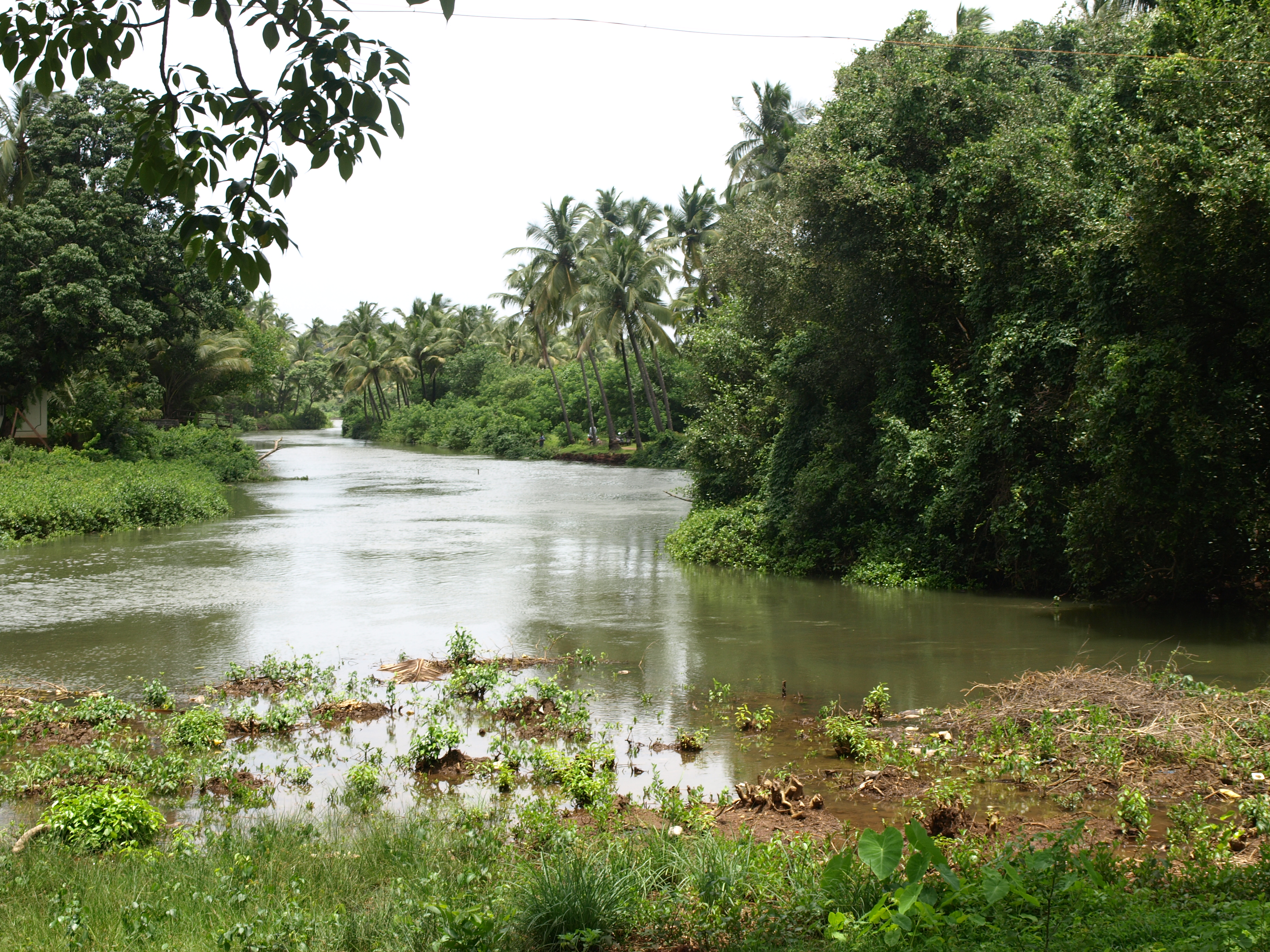
Waters flowing in Siolim, Goa

* Sateri Temple: Designed by Goan architect Ralino de Souza after 1961, this temple is situated in Shelim, Siolim. Dedicated to goddess Sateri, it is known for the festival of Diwsans, when the temple is surrounded by a long feri. Many women go round the temple in a procession with oil lamps in their hand and on their head.

== Government and politics ==
Siolim is part of Siolim (Goa Assembly constituency) and North Goa (Lok Sabha constituency).

== Schools ==
There are five schools in Siolim, linked together in a community known as "Siolim Super School Complex". Every year, the Super School Complex organises a common exam for students of Std X (tenth) in October. The Super School Complex also organises competitions for students of these five schools. These schools are:

- Holy Cross High School: Popular convent, founded by the Congregation of the Daughters of the Cross in 1933. Since 1975, it has been run as a co-ed school, with boarding facilities only for girls.
- St Francis Xavier's High School and Higher Secondary School was established in Corlim, Mapusa, in 1937 by Miguel Antonio D'Souza, and transferred to Bamon-Vaddo, Siolim, in 1950. Since 1953 it has been run by the Missionaries of St. Francis de Sales.
- Shri Shanta Vidyalaya: Situated in Sodiem, and founded on 9 July 1973. It is managed by Vidya Bharati. Mrs. Prajeeta Sangale is the current Headmistress.
- Shri Vasant Vidyalaya: Situated at Porta-Vaddo.
- Keerti Vidyalaya: Situated at Portawaddo, set up in 1969 and managed by Swami Vivekanand Seva Sangh, Siolim.

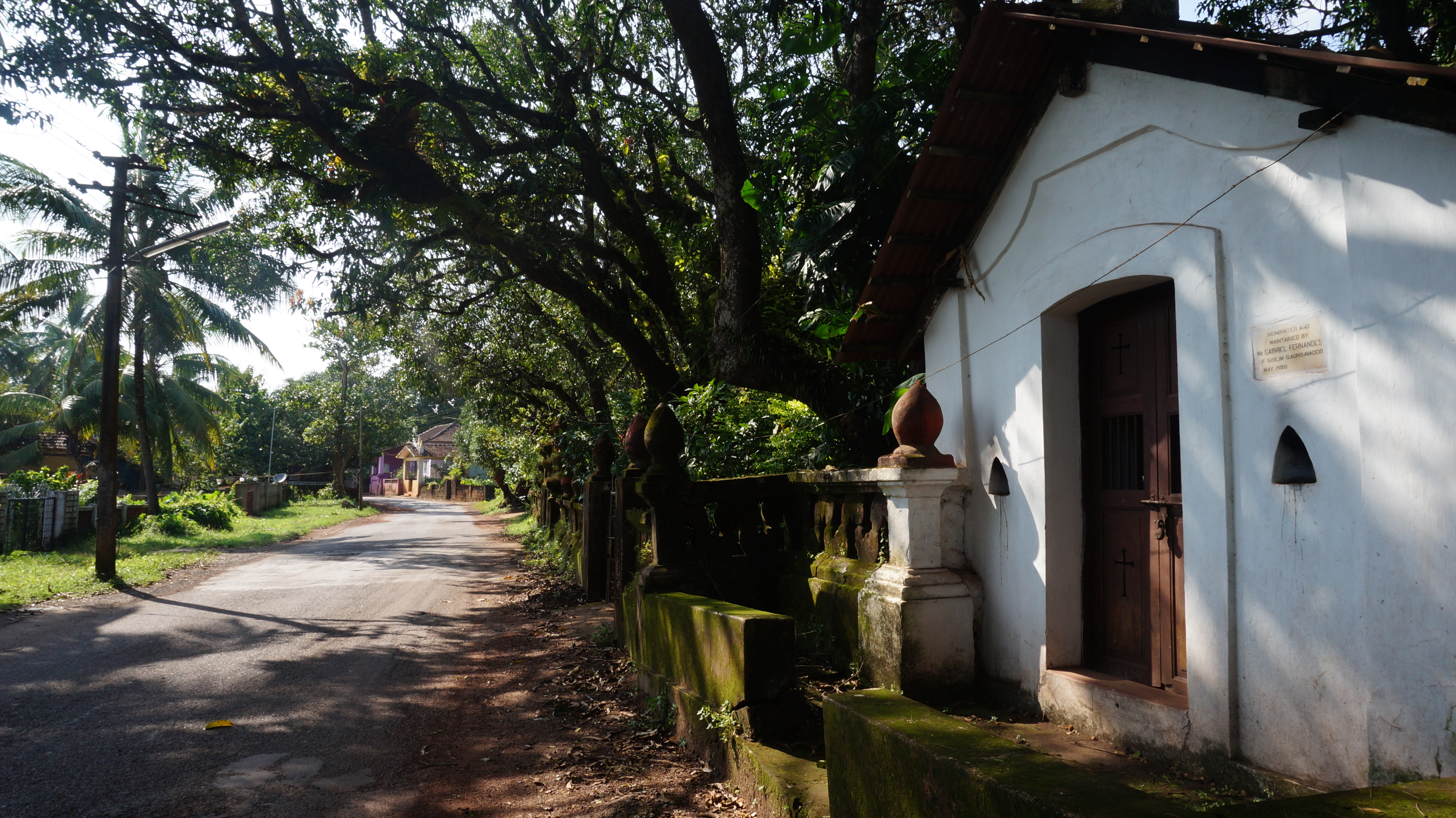
Siolim roadside view, Goa

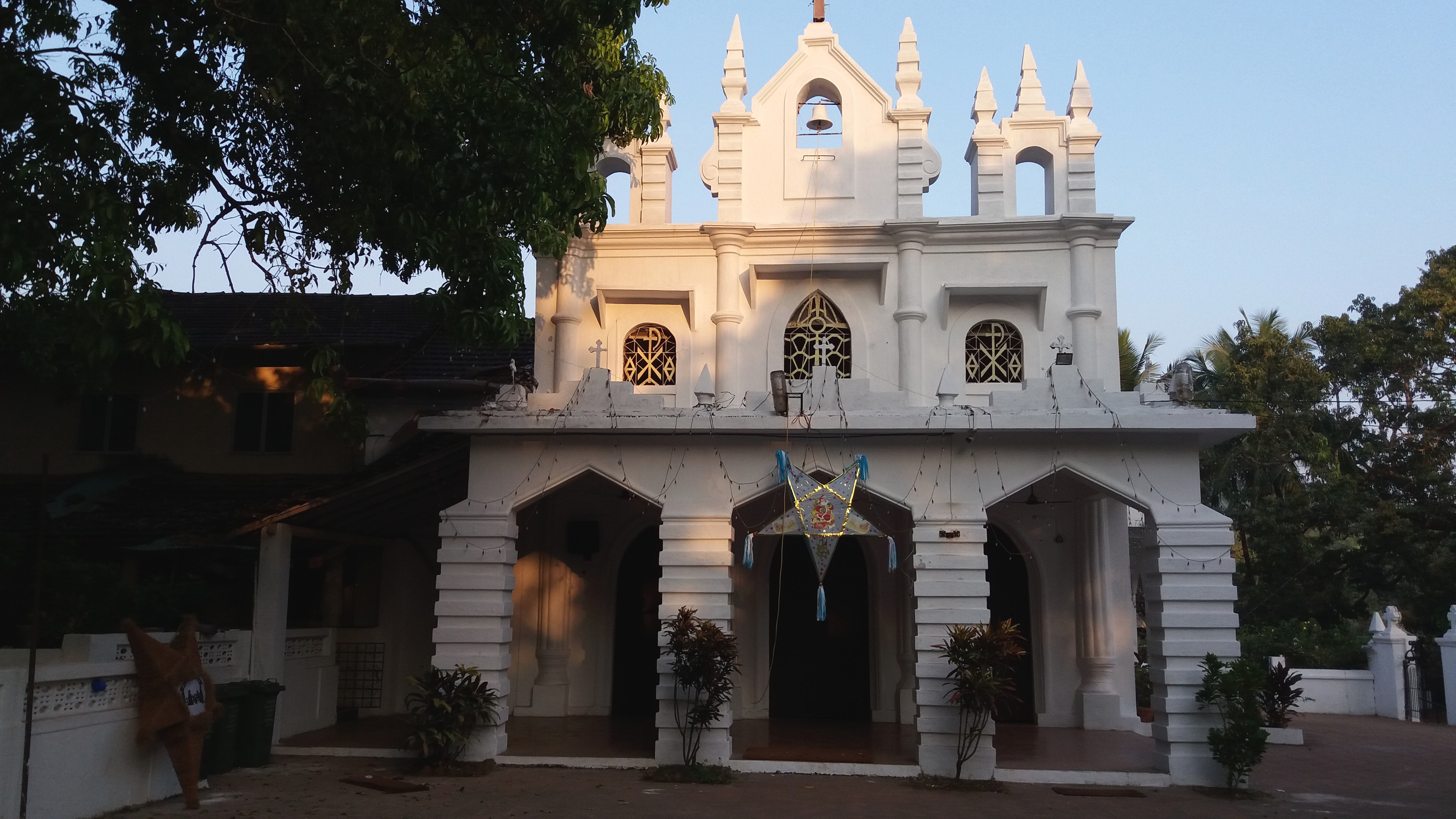
Our Lady of Consolation of the Persecuted or Tropa church located in Sodiem, Siolim, Goa

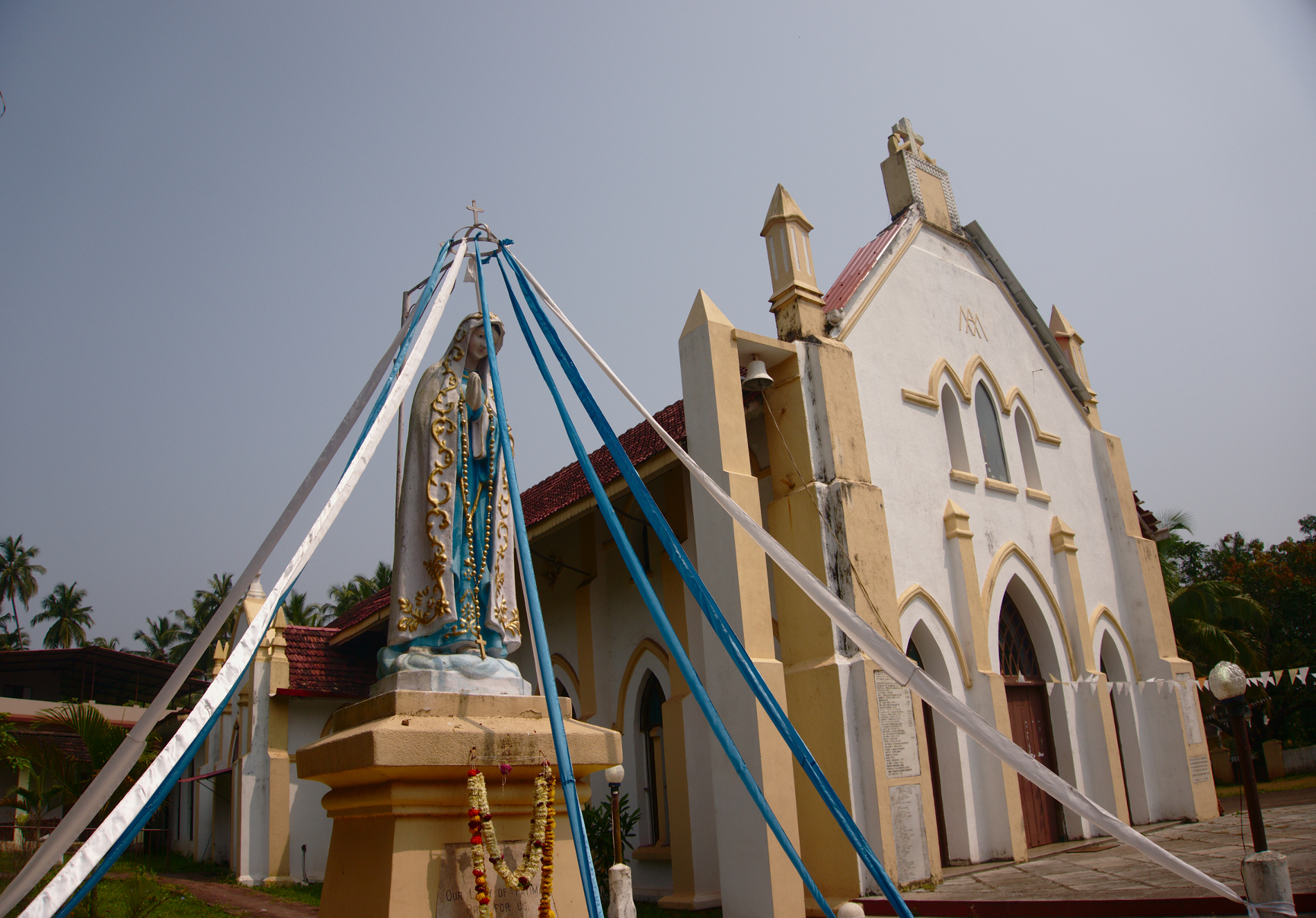
Mae De Deus Chapel located in Gaunsavaddo, Sodiem, Siolim, Goa

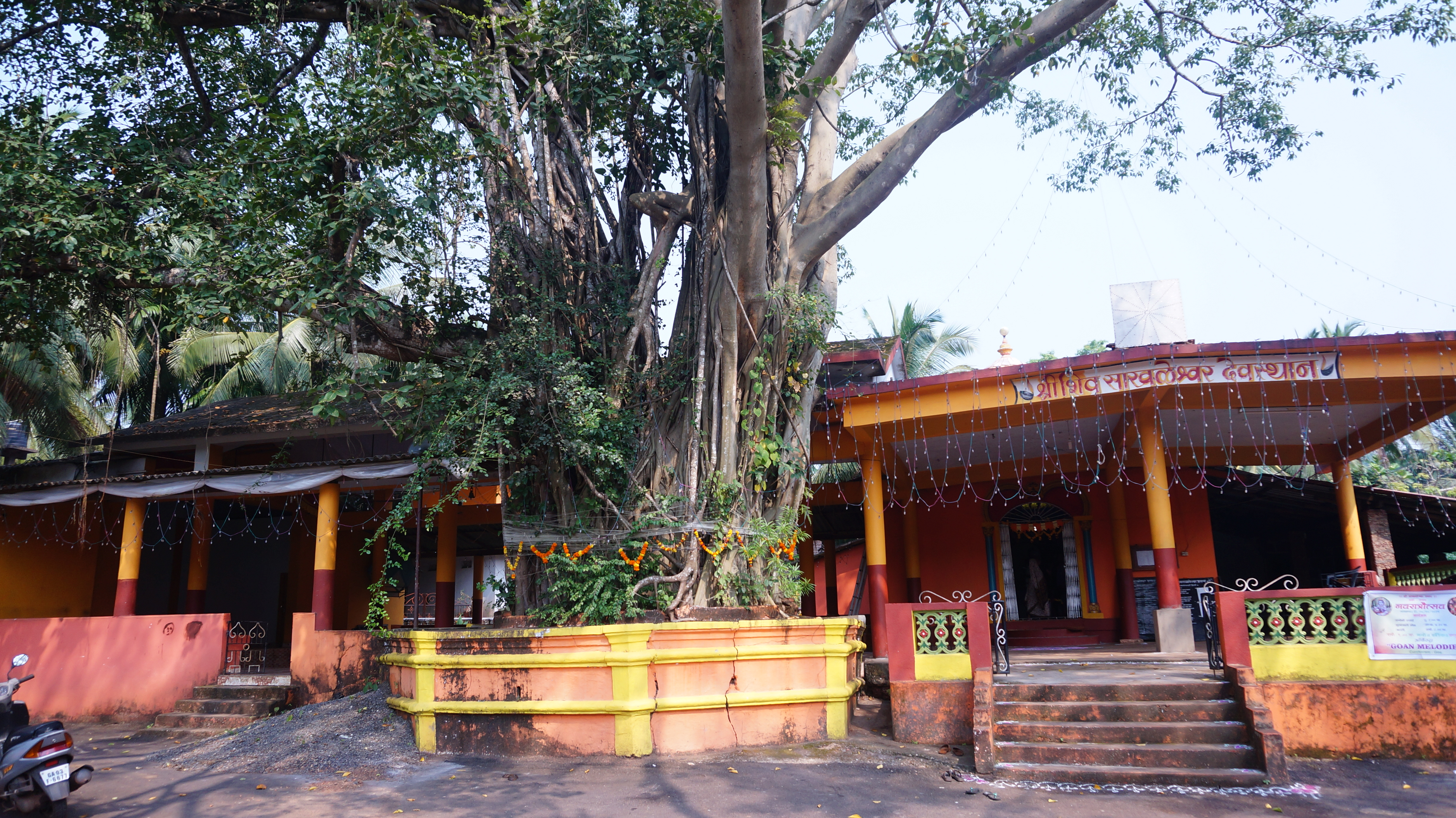
Shiv Sakhaleshwar Devasthan, Temple in Sodiem, Siolim, Goa

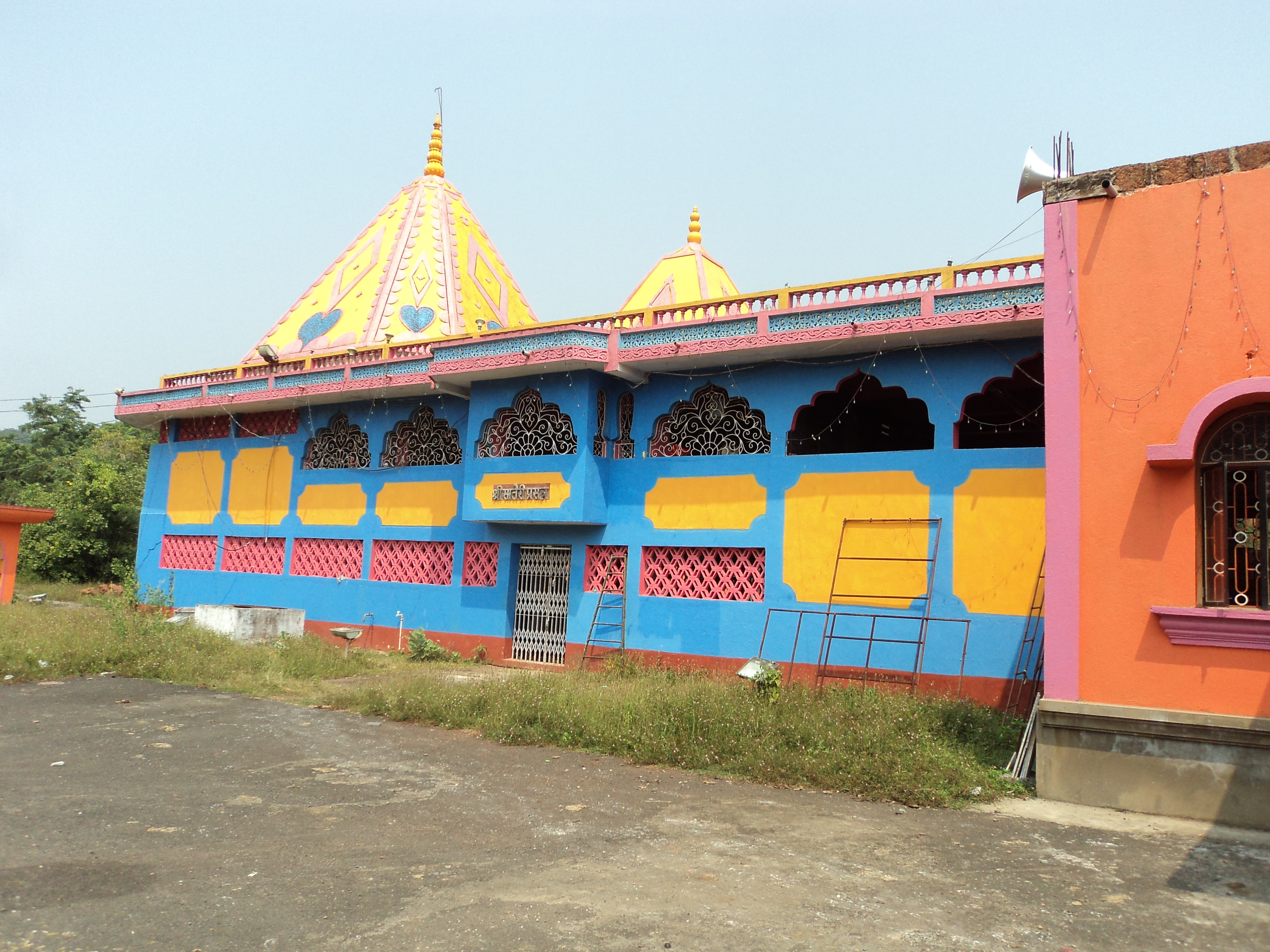
Devi Sateri Mandir Shelim, Sodiem, Siolim Goa

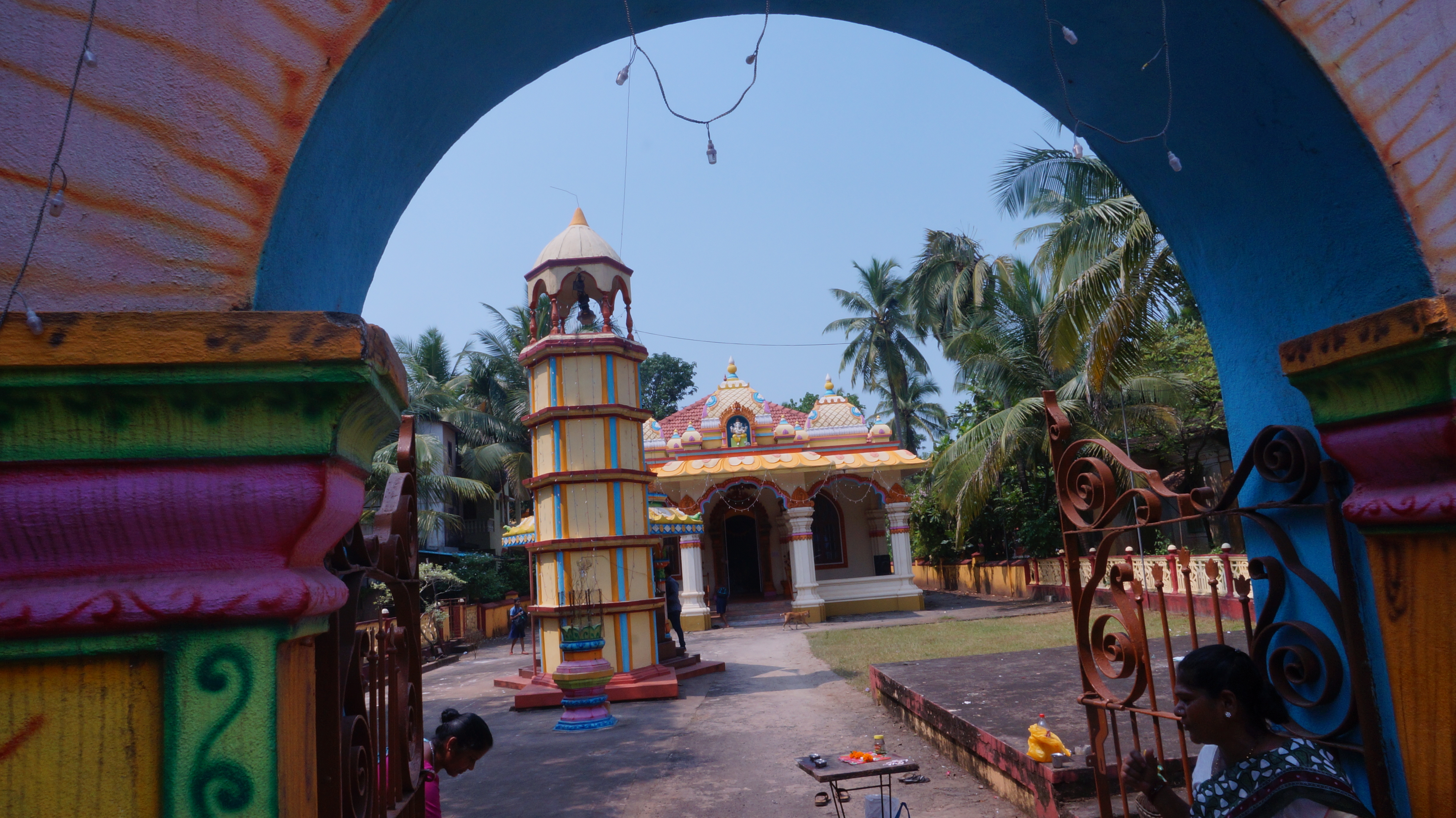
Shri Laxmi Narayan Temple Marna Siolim Goa

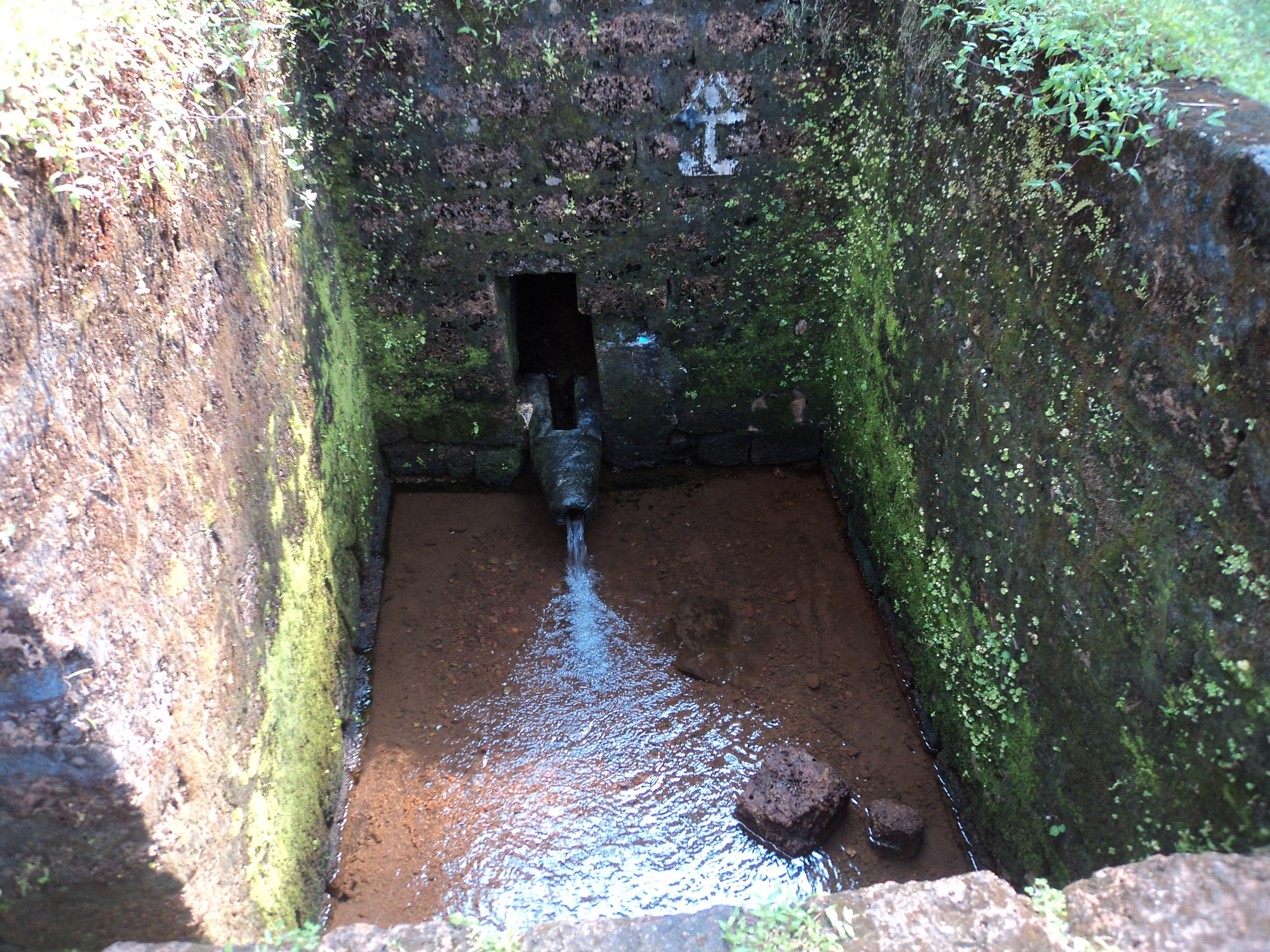
Spring in Maina, Sodiem, Siolim, Goa

== People of Siolim ==
Siolim has produced doctors, musicians, sports-persons, bishops, priests, and other representatives in other professions:

=== Musicians ===
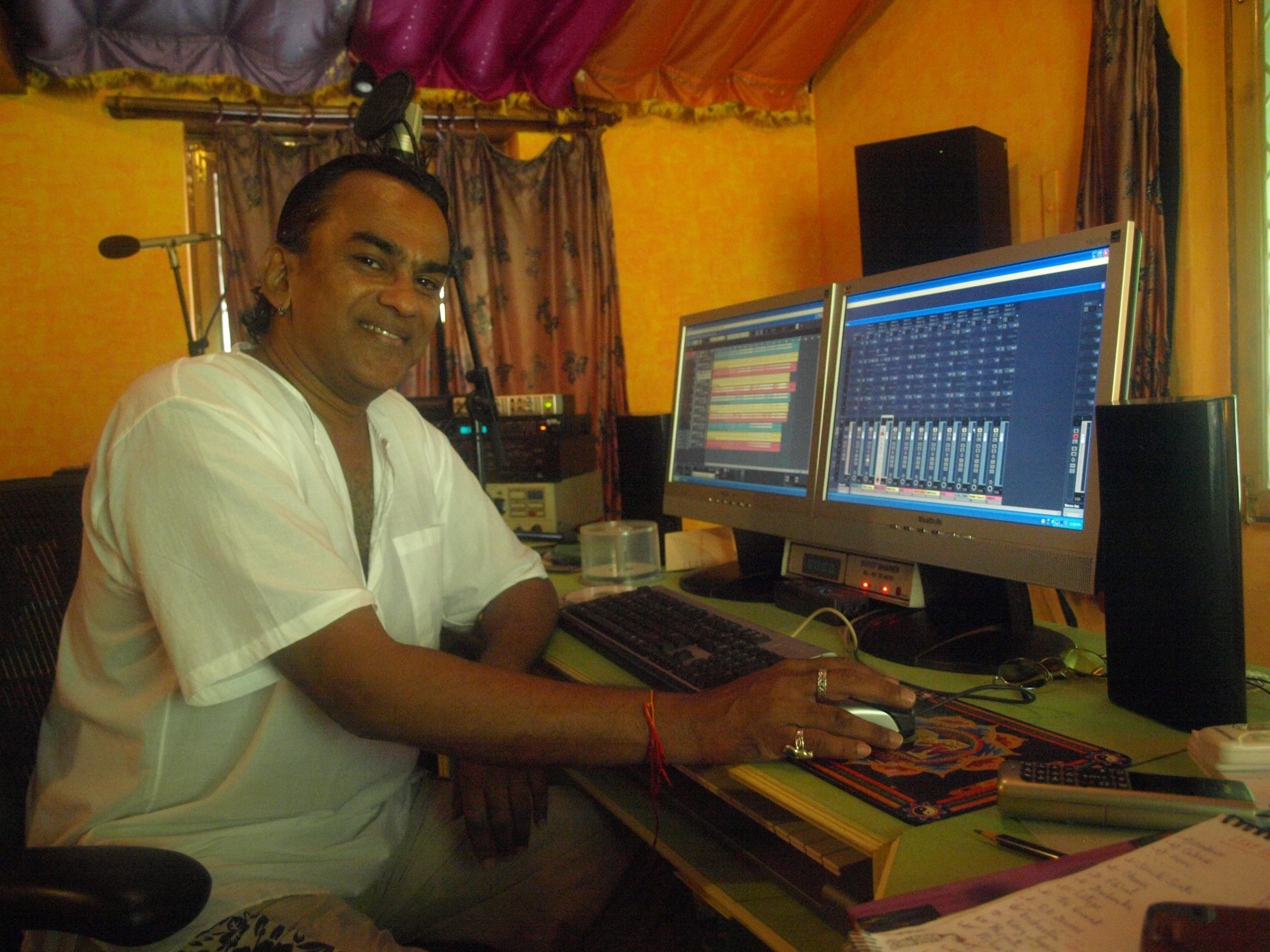
Pop star Remo Fernandes, at his recording studio in Siolim

Siolim has been home to some prominent musicians. Relatives of Pinta Xapai, who died at 114, in 1892, erected a statue of Beethoven in his courtyard in Gaunsa-Vaddo. Inscriptions identify the Brazil-born descendant who funded the project, as also the descendant who performed the inauguration.

- Prominent Indian pop musician Remo Fernandes hails from Siolim's Fernandes -Vaddo -(Guddem).
- Another well-known musician was late Joaozinho Carvalho "Johnson". Johnson of the prominent Goan dance band Johnson & Jolly Boys was also a footballer in his younger days. Late Johnson's son, Juvencio Carvalho has carried on the tradition, by training budding musicians.
- Late Rosario Tequila Basil was a saxophonist, who played for diners at class hotels in Bombay and the Hindi film ensembles.
- Writer-trumpeter late Reginald Fernandes played for Hal Green, Nelly Batliwalla and her orchestra. Known as the "Romansincho Patxai" (Emperor of Konkani novels), he also wrote a record number of Konkani novels, nearly 100. A musician of high repute, he has left behind several Konkani compositions, which are played still on All India Radio, one of the well-known ones being the melancholic Adeus Korchea Vellar (The Time of Saying Goodbye) sung by Allan Costa.
- Late Antoninho de Souza was a music director and music recordist for the Portuguese-time Goan radio station Emissora de Goa & All India Radio, Panjim. The music and lyrics for the beautiful Konkani duet, Rajan and Prema were written by him.

=== Other prominent individuals of Siolim ===
- Well-known cartoonist Alex Raphael Fernandes "Alexyz" is from Siolim.
- One of Goa's most prominent tiatrist, Kid Boxer hailed from Siolim
- Domnic Fernandes from Bamon-Vaddo, was a librarian at St Xavier’s College, Bombay, between 1961 and 1997, and has been considered a walking encyclopaedia. Dominic was the first professional librarian of that prominent college and is credited with building up the library collection, having merged Departmental Libraries to create the Centralised Science Library, starting a photocopying facility in 1977-78 and promoting an open access system in the library when few college libraries did. Domnic "started the famous Canteen, lectured on public speaking, edited the college magazine and Bibliodelic for many years. Xavier’s Development Programme or XDP was created and nurtured by him. His collection of paintings adorns walls in every corridor of St. Xavier’s College today... he was the President of BUCLA (Bombay University College Librarians Association) for a number of years."
- Late Chevalier Bruno Fernandes, MBE & Knight of St Silvester, lived in Marna Siolim. Architect Ralino J de Souza is another prominent person, as was Herman Raymond (1907-1978), a former judge in Karachi.

== Historical firsts in the village ==
Electric power was introduced in 1972 and tap water flowed in 1975. By 1980 Siolim had a telephone exchange, which has since shifted to a large building. The first KTC bus travelled to Siolim on 14 July 1981. Broadband internet access was first available in January 2008.

Three brothers from Gaunsa-Vaddo - Santa, Ganexa and Zagre Gauns - are believed to have been the first Christian converts. Their descendants are Fr. Cyriaco Fernandes MSFS, Victor Santana, Dr. Cosmas and Fr. Damian Fernandes. Incidentally, there is a book written by Rev. Fr. Cyriaco Fernandes which gives a lot of information about Siolim, and Fr. Cyriaco's life in Brazil; the book is titled "Indian Apostle in Brazil" written by Rev. Fr. Damian Fernandes.

An Indian Apostle in Brazil by Fr. Damian Fernandes is a detailed life account of Fr. Antonio Paulo Cyriaco Fernandes by his nephew, drawn out from letters to relatives in India. It was published by the Goa Jesuit Mission at the Nagpur press in 1952. This book contains information about Fr Fernandes' life in Brazil and also information about Siolim.

== Concerns ==
Most of Siolim's green fields and hills are being destroyed due to mass immigration from other states of India, with an enormous rise in new constructions of housing for immigrants. Open spaces for children and youth to play outdoors are fast disappearing. Villagers have also voiced concern over unplanned development in the area, and the need to protect green areas.

== Miscellaneous ==
- Siolim has had a few football teams, the most prominent being Football Club of Siolim (FC Siolim).
- Siolim has inspired the Goan mando "Siole dongra sokolu" (the title of which could translate to Beneath The Hills of Siolim)

== Demographics ==
As of 2001 India census, Siolim had a population of 10,311. Males constitute 48% of the population and females 52%. Siolim has an average literacy rate of 82%, higher than the national average of 59.5%: male literacy is 87%, and female literacy is 77%. In Siolim, 9% of the population is under 6 years of age.
