= Krishnadas Shama Goa State Central Library =

Central library in Goa, India

Coordinates: 15°29′38.6664″N 73°49′59.0808″E

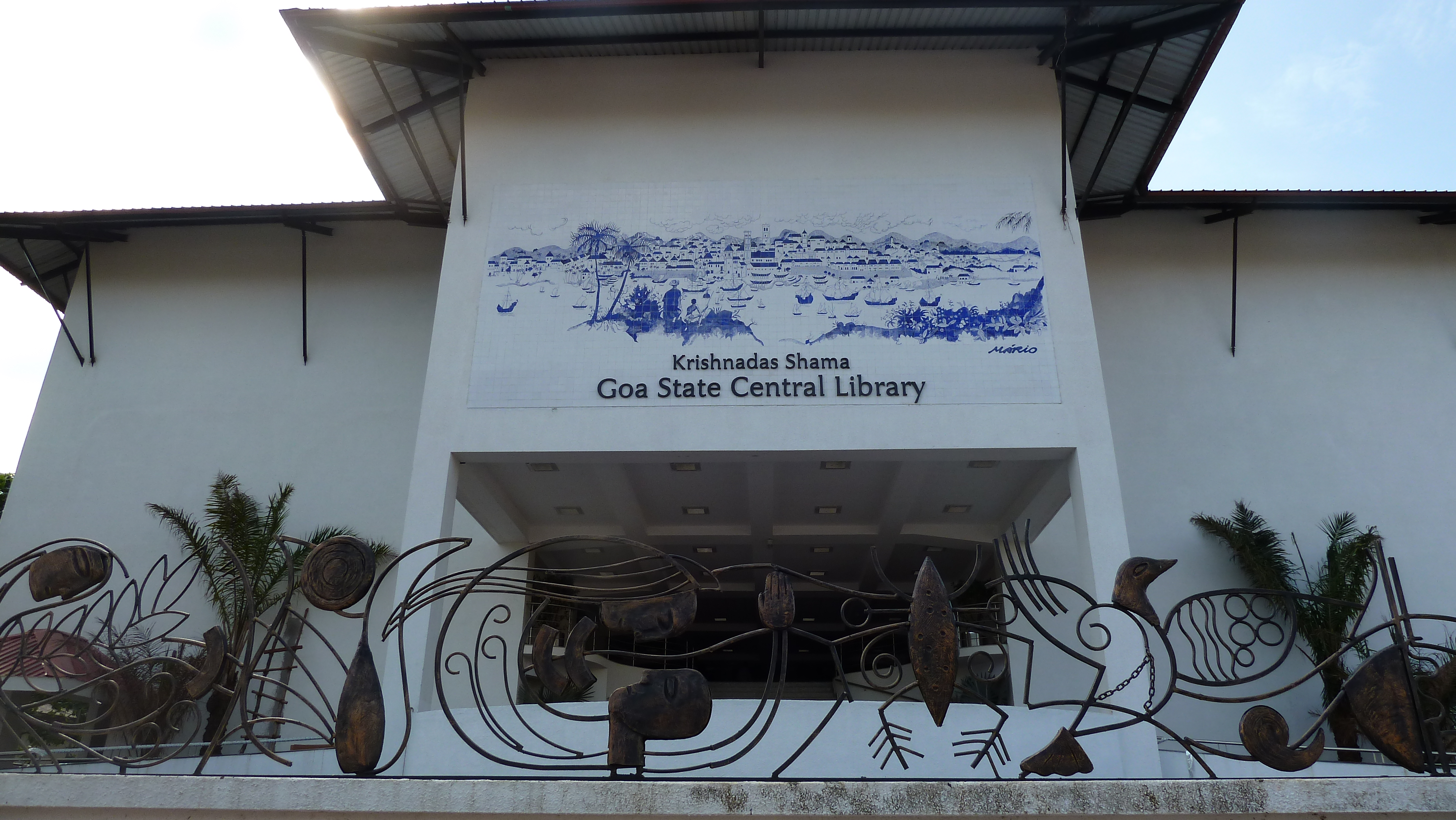
- Location: Panjim, Goa, India
- Type: State library
- Established: 1832; 194 years ago (as Publica Livraria, Academia Militar de Goa); 1870; 156 years ago (as Biblotheca Publica da Nova Goa); 1897; 129 years ago (as Bibliotheca Nacional de Nova Goa)

Collection
- Items collected: books, journals, newspapers, magazines, sound and music recordings, patents, databases, maps, stamps, prints, drawings and manuscripts

Other information
- Parent organization: Government of Goa
- Website: centrallibrary.goa.gov.in/home

Krishnadas Shama Goa State Central Library is the main library in the State of Goa, India. It is located in Panjim (Panaji) and its website claims that it is the first public library to be set up in India, in the early 1830s.

== Oldest in India ==
According to its official site, it is "the oldest Public Library in India," having been inaugurated on 15 September 1832 by the Portuguese Viceroy of Goa, Dom Manuel de Portugal e Castro. It was known then as the Publica Livraria of the Academia Militar de Goa (Military Training Institute). In 1834, the Portuguese government ordered the "suppression" of certain religious orders. The book collections of various convents belonging to these religious orders were transferred to the library, augmenting the repository considerably. In 1836, the name was changed to Bibliotheca Pública and it was thrown open to the public.

In 1836 itself, the library was shifted to premises where the Municipal proceedings were held. In 1870, it was named as the Biblotheca Publica da Nova Goa. In February 1897, the library was raised to the status of a National Library and renamed as Bibliotheca Nacional de Nova Goa. Later it was renamed as the Bibliotheca National Vasco da Gama.

By a decree dated 18 March 1956, the Privilege of Deposito Legal was made applicable to this library, making it entitled to receive, free of cost, copies of all publications from Portugal and her overseas colonies. After functioning as an annex of the institute, it was open for about 35 years. Kakodkar says that from September 1959, the library was put under the direct administrative control of the Serviços de Instrucção e Saúde (Education and Health Services).

In the past, the library's collection consisted mainly of books in Portuguese, French, Spanish, Latin, and English. A catalogue of the library was printed in 1907. Later, a card catalogue of the author, title and cross-reference were prepared.

== From Portugal, overseas "provinces" ==
In March 1925 it became part of the Instituto Vasco da Gama, an academic-cultural institution, and was renamed as the Biblioteca Nacional Vasco da Gama. By Decree Law 38684 of 18 March 1952, the Deposito Legal (Delivery Act) was made applicable to this library, according to its official website.

Resultantly, the library received all publications from Portugal and her overseas Provinces. From September 1959, the Bibliotheca was separated from the Institute and placed under the administrative control of Serviços de Instrucção e Saude (Education and Health Services) and renamed as Biblioteca Nacional de Goa.

On the completion of its 175th year, a first-day postal cover was released by the Government of India's Department of Posts.

After the end of Portuguese rule in Goa in 1961, the library was renamed as the Central Library, and its activities expanded with lending, reference and special services for children. It build up its collection in English, Marathi, Hindi, Konkani and languages like Bengali and Urdu.

Its local history and rare book collection today includes titles from the 16th and 17th centuries, manuscripts and imprints, books on the history and culture of Goa, including Indo-Portuguese history, bound volumes of local journals and newspapers and books received under the Press and Registration of Books Act, 1867.

Under the Government of India's Registration of Books Act, 1956, the Central Library is the copyright library of Goa and the publisher of every book published in Goa must send three copies of the same to this library. The Central Library compiles and publishes its annual bibliography of Goa-published books in the Official Gazette of Goa.

Today, the Central Library is the State apex public library. It has under the control of its Directorate of Arts & Culture some seven taluka (sub-district) libraries, besides 121 government village libraries, panchayat and non-government organisation-run libraries currently functioning in Goa.

== Collection ==
Its pre-1961 (Portuguese Goa) collection consists mainly of books and journals in Portuguese, French, Latin, English and a few books in local languages like Konkani and Marathi. Some 40,000 volumes date back to the pre-1961 era.

Among other valuable texts, the Library holds incomplete collections of nineteenth and early twentieth century newspapers in Marathi, Konkani, English and Portuguese, published from Goa and from Bombay. Many of these are in a state of advanced disrepair.

The library used to be the repository institution for Mozambique, and for other Portuguese colonies in Africa until the 18th century. There are educational reports and other official publications regarding Africa in the library. A professional catalogue for these collections can be accessed from the website of the University of Aveiro, Portugal under the collection Memórias de África.

According to the Citizen's Charter of the Directorate of Arts and Culture, "The State Central library is one of the oldest library in India is open for all readers irrespective of class, creed or nationality. The collection is available for reference in [the] Rare and Goan History Section and Reference Section ... the Lending Section... the Newspaper and Magazine Section..."

The State Central Library has a more than 180,000 book collection, in different languages like English, Hindi, Marathi, Konkani, Portuguese, since 1832. About 15,00,000 pages of rare books, official gazettes and newspapers are available in electronic format (microfilm Form). State Central Library acts a depository library under Press and Registration Books Act, 1867 and Delivery of Books Act, 1954 wherein the entire published book in the State should be deposited in the library for national posterity.

Reference sources like general and subject dictionaries, encyclopedias, Who's Who directories, biographical dictionaries, gazetteers, atlases, travel guides and various other reference sources are available for users. Books for competitive examinations and valuable books on different subjects also form the part of this collection. Students and research scholars also utilise the library.

== Location ==
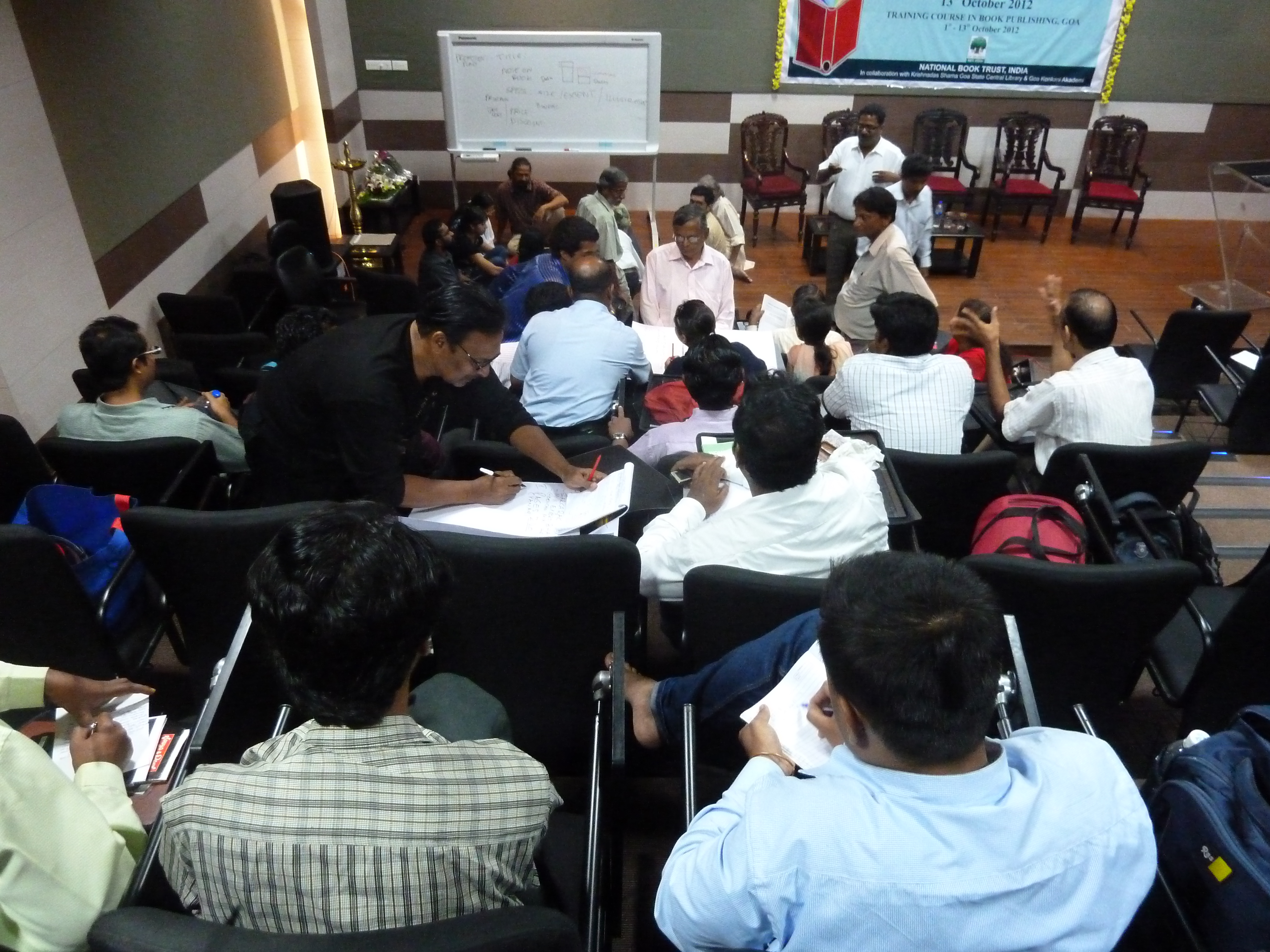
Participants join in a workshop on book publishing at the Central Library, Panjim.

The library was first housed in the first floor of the Police Building in Panjim (Panaji), Goa's state capital. Since 2011, the library has shifted to its new premises in the Pato locality of Panjim, near the main bus stand. It is housed in a spacious, six-floor building designed by award-winning architect Gerard da Cunha.

News reports in April 2011 quoted officials of the Goa State Infrastructure Development Corporation (GSIDC) as saying that the Rs 32 crore (Rs 320 million) project comprises six floors and covers an area of 13,369 square metres.

== Facilities ==
Media reports have projected that the library "will have" over half a million books—over twice the previous number of the smaller library which was located in the heart of town—besides access to 200 magazines and 20 newspapers. Also promised (prior to the launch of the library) were full-automation in lending and receiving books using the LIBSYS software for library automation (LIBSYS allows for acquisitions or purchase of books; cataloguing and organising documents; serial control for periodicals; circulation including membership records and books issue and return; and article indexing to create a database of articles published in journals).

A special, user-friendly section has also been set up for children (on the second floor), a braille section for visually-challenged readers, an internet section. Officials were quoted saying that plans include "a facility for microfilming and a book preservation laboratory ... (among) the 27 sections that comprise the new centrally air-conditioned state library."

The ex-curator of the central library Carlos Fernandes said that the LIBSYS system is a library-management software that will connect all government libraries in Goa to the central library in Panjim. You can log on to the library website from home and check whether it has a particular book and whether that book is present in the library shelf or out on circulation.

== Timings ==
The library is open on all seven days of the week, including weekends, but is closed on public holidays only. It is also kept open during the lunch break, and its working hours are from 9.30 am to 5:30 pm, though it closes a little earlier on the weekends. Saturdays and Sundays the library remains open from 9:30 am to 5:30 pm.

== Other roles ==
Maria Pia de Menezes Rodrigues says the Central Library offers lending, reading and reference facilities, the first being available only to registered members. Students from Goa and the rest of India make "extensive use of the collection", according to Rodrigues. Research facilities are available to scholars from India and abroad, specially those working on topics related to Goa and Indo-Portuguese history. The library has taken part in organising World Book Day, Librarian's Day, National Book Week and the like. Inter-library loan services have been extended to prisons, government and non-government organisations, she says.

== The Book in Goa ==
According to Dr. Archana A. Kakodkar the Carreira da India, or round-voyage between Portugal and India, brought books from Lisbon, Africa and Brazil and other Portuguese colonies – in a two-way traffic – in bundles and boxes as cargoes on the ships.

== Membership of the library ==
Being a public library, funded by the State, it is open to all, and everyone is allowed to use its facilities. Home-lending however requires membership of the library, which currently costs between Rs 200 to 750 (lifetime deposit, no annual fee). To sign-up as a member, which is a speedy process normally done within half an hour, one requires to produce one or two passport sized photographs, and also a local proof of residence (which contains your name, address and photograph – such as a driving licence, passport, Aadhaar card, etc.).

The requirements for membership (adult) are as follows:

- One self photograph, in passport-size.
- A photo identity card showing the applicant's residential address. (Aadhaar Card, social security card, passport, driving license, a residence certificate issued by the competent authority, an office identity, a college identity card, a bank passport carrying a photo and address are eligible to be used for this purpose.)

For children (below 10 years) the membership requirement is as follows:

- Two passport-sized photographs.
- A school identity card, or Aadhaar Card or passport.

Following are the fees of the library, according to information displayed at the library:

Deposit fees (refundable)	Category	Borrowing facility permitted
Rs 50	Children (below 10 years)	1 book + 1 magazine
Rs 200	AC-1	1 book + 1 magazine
Rs 450	AC-2	2 books + 2 magazines
Rs 750	AC-3	3 books + 3 magazines

== Administration today ==
The State Central Library Goa is currently under the administrative control of Government of Goa's Directorate of Art & Culture. The Curator is the Head of State Central Library, and its current Curator is Sulaksha Kolmule.

== Layout of the library ==
The table below depicts the location of various resources in the library:

Floor	Facility available
First	Membership Counter. Newspaper/Periodical Section. Braille Section. Book Issue/Return Counter. Self Check-In/Check-Out Kiosk. Books Drop Box.
Second	Children's Section. Maps/Globes Section. Kids Audio Visual Hall. Internet Browsing Section. ADMINISTRATIVE WING: Lecture Halls. Gymnasium. Study Room. Delivery of Book Act Section.
Third	Circulation Section/Book Stack. ADMINISTRATIVE WING: RRRLF Section. Technical Section. Establishment & Accounts Section. Conference Hall. Chamber of the Curator. Research Cubicles.
Fourth	Rare and Goan History Book Section. Manuscript Section. Old Newspaper/Magazine Section. Microfilm Browsing Section. Data Imaging Centre. Fumigation Section. Conservation Laboratory.
Fifth	Reference Section. Reading Terrace. Laptop Cubicles.
Sixth	Portuguese Section.

== Gallery ==
Krishnadas Shama State Central Library Goa

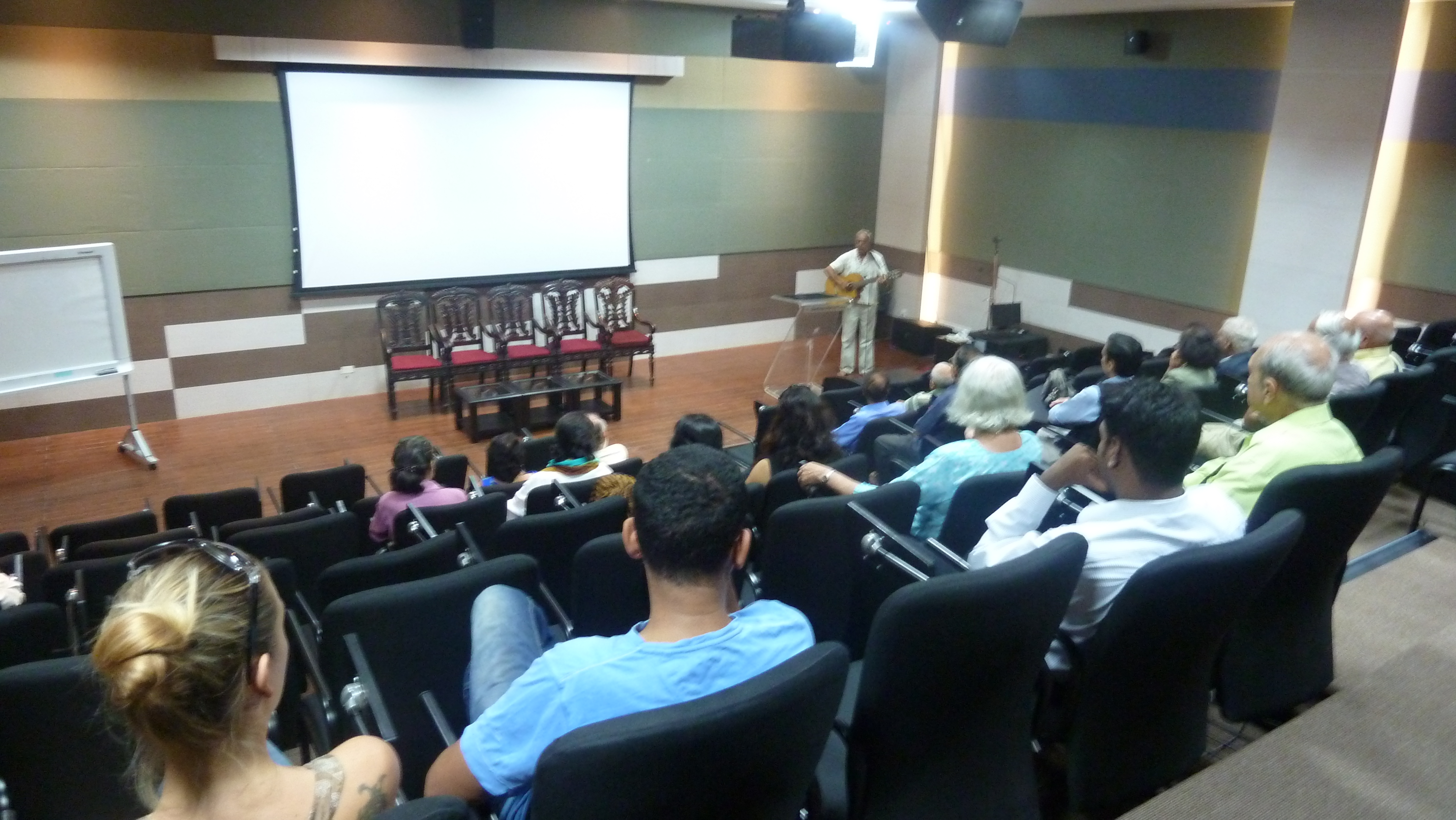
Visitors to the library.

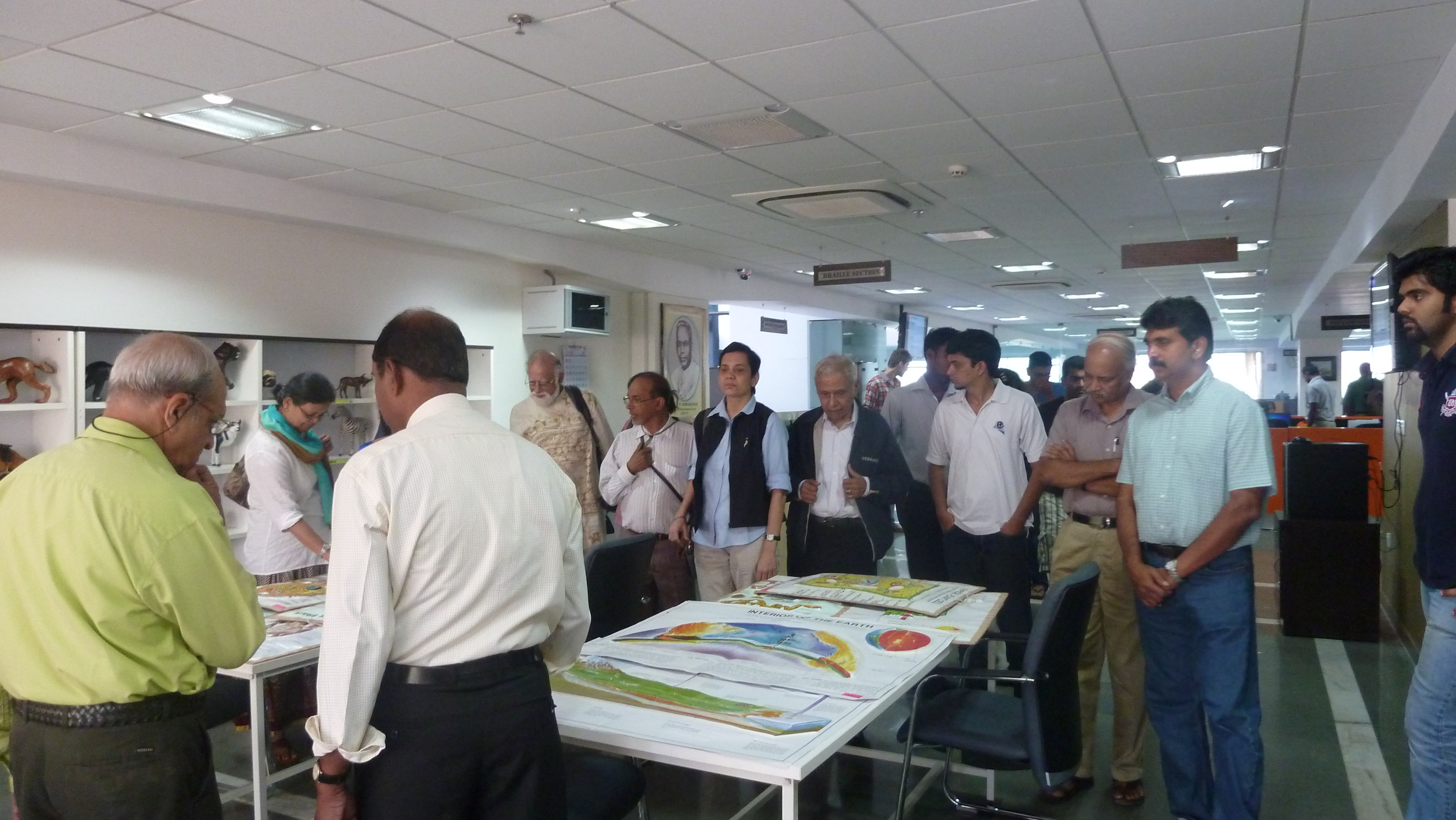
Braille section.

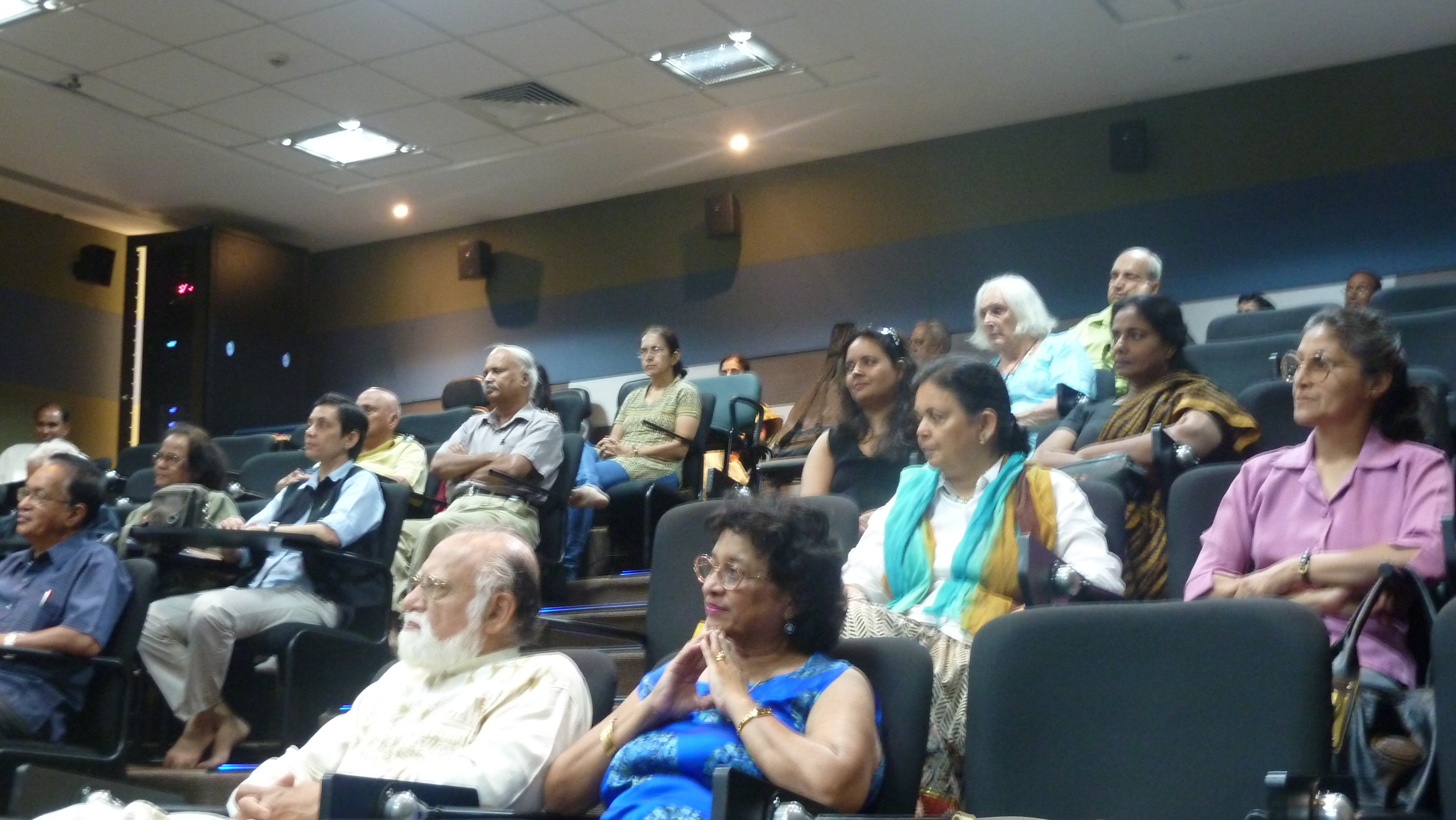
Visiting the library.

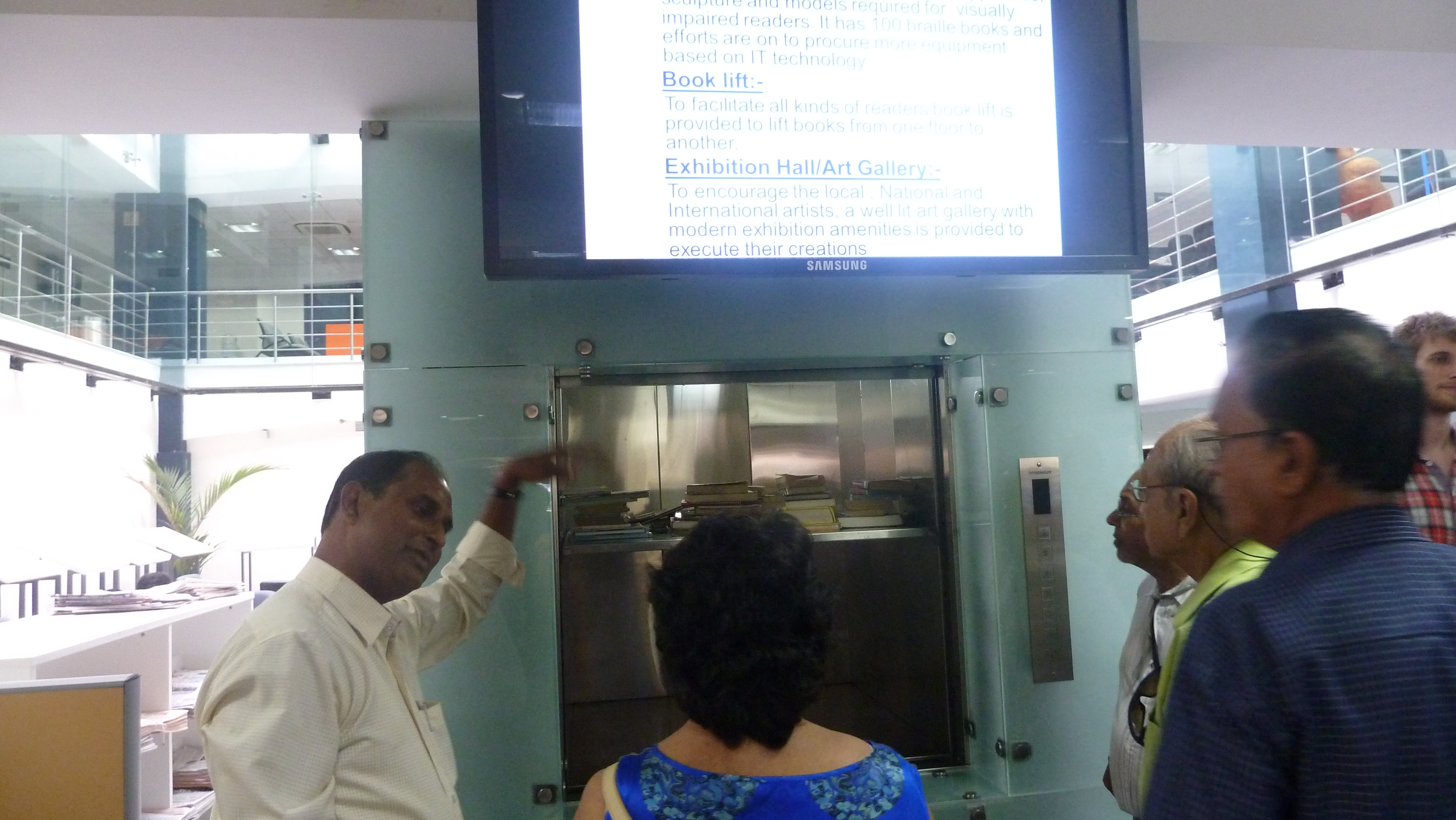
A book lift.

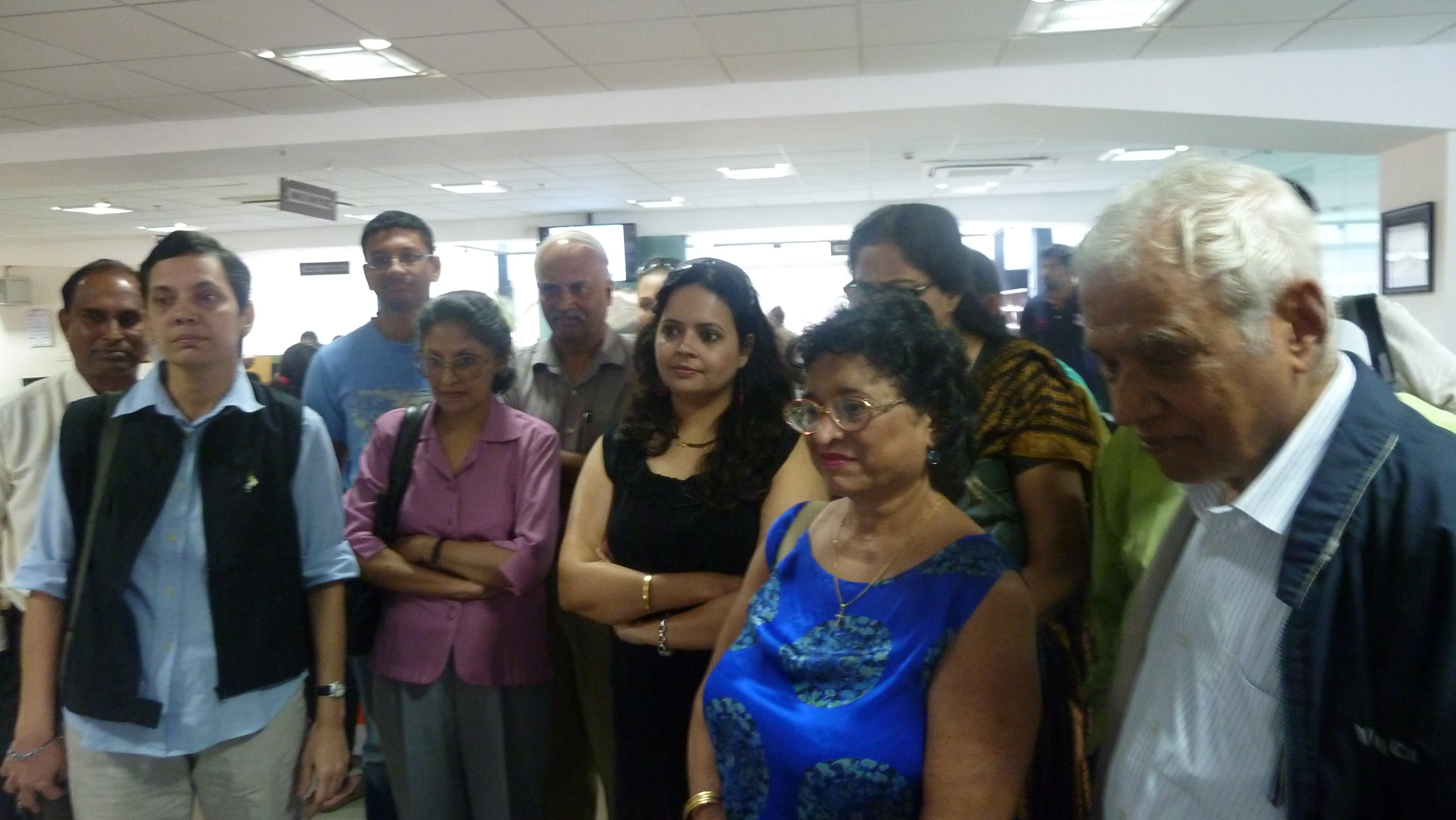
A tour of the library.

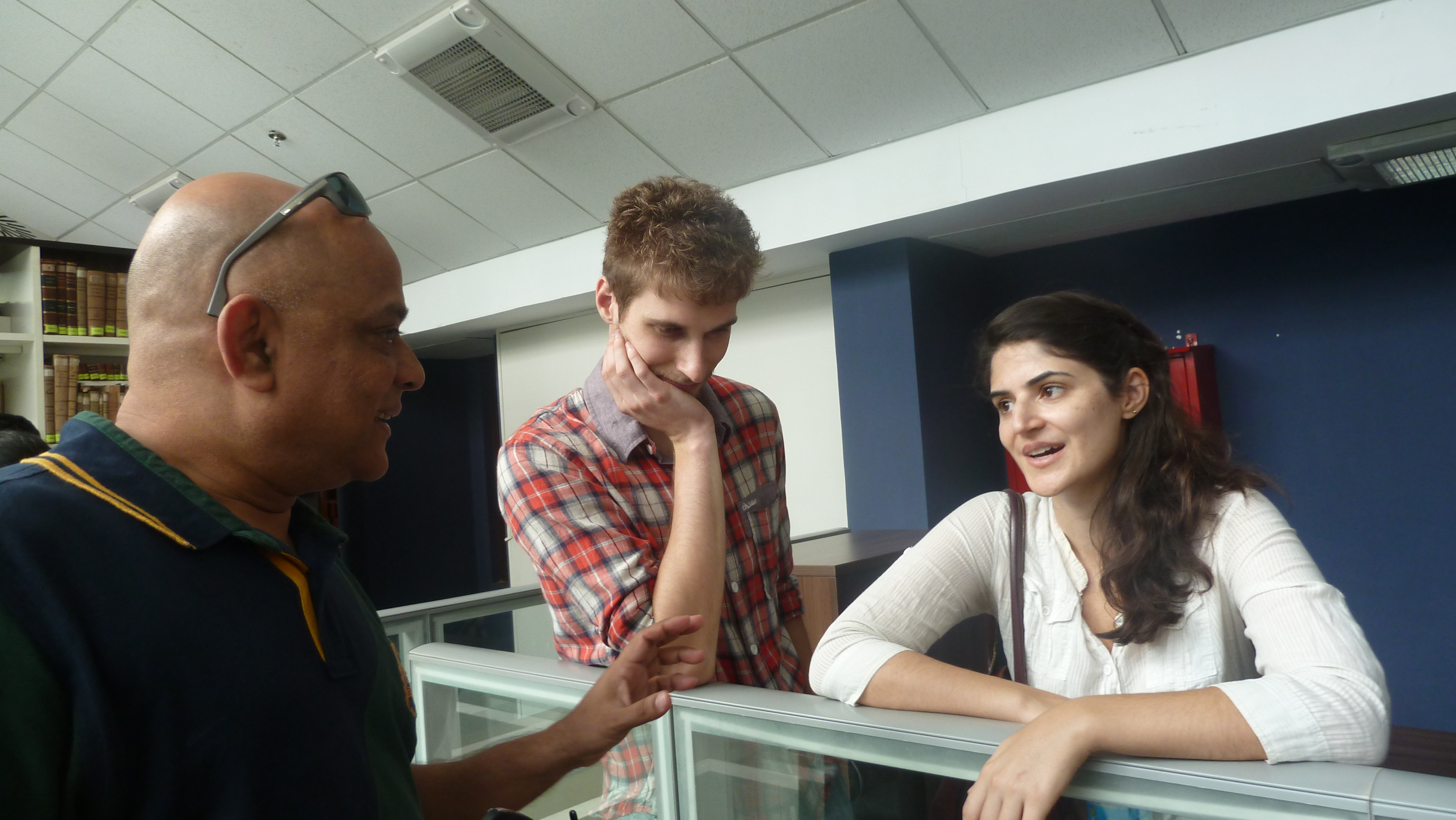
Attracting guests from near and far.

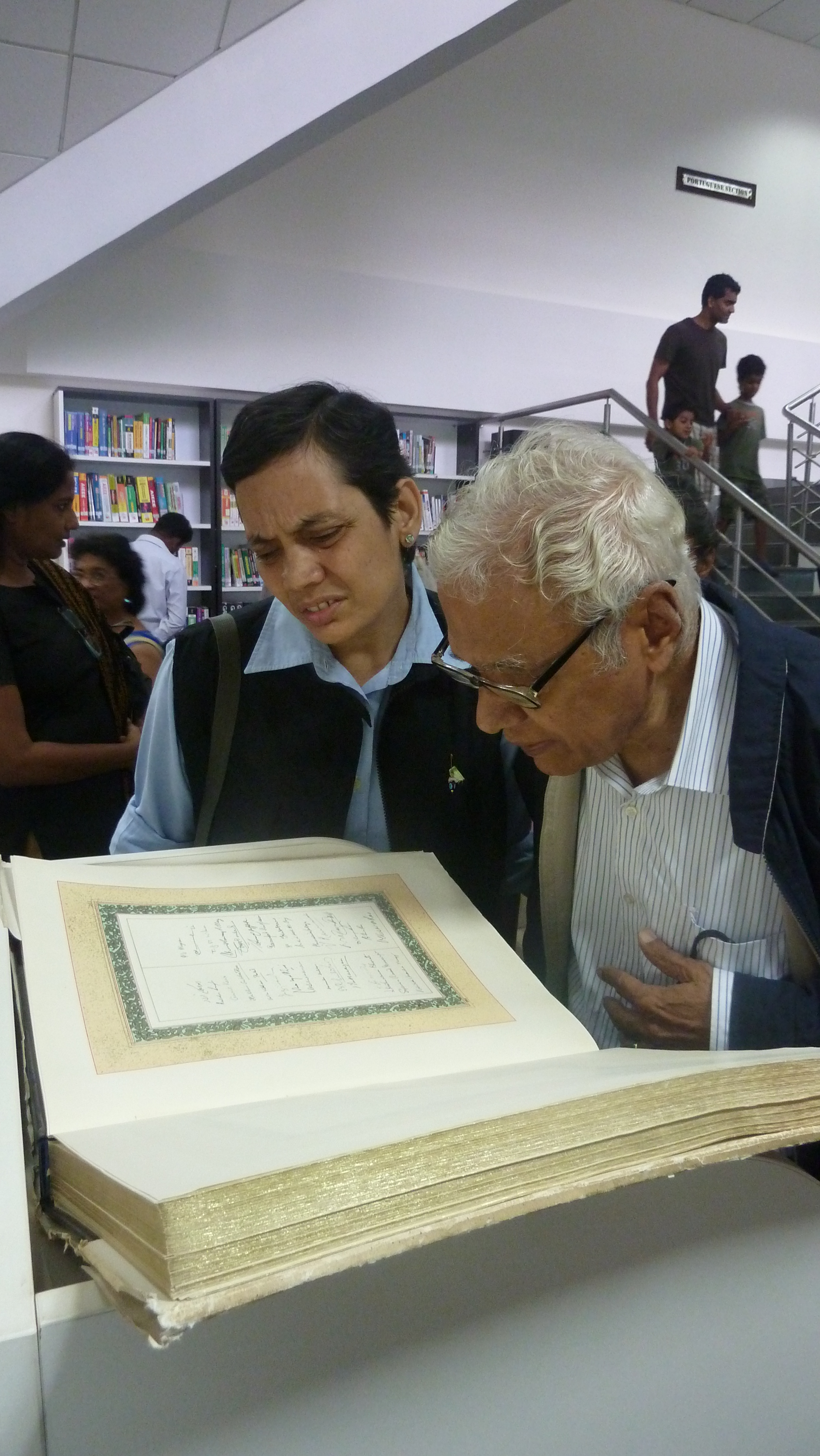
Old-time books.

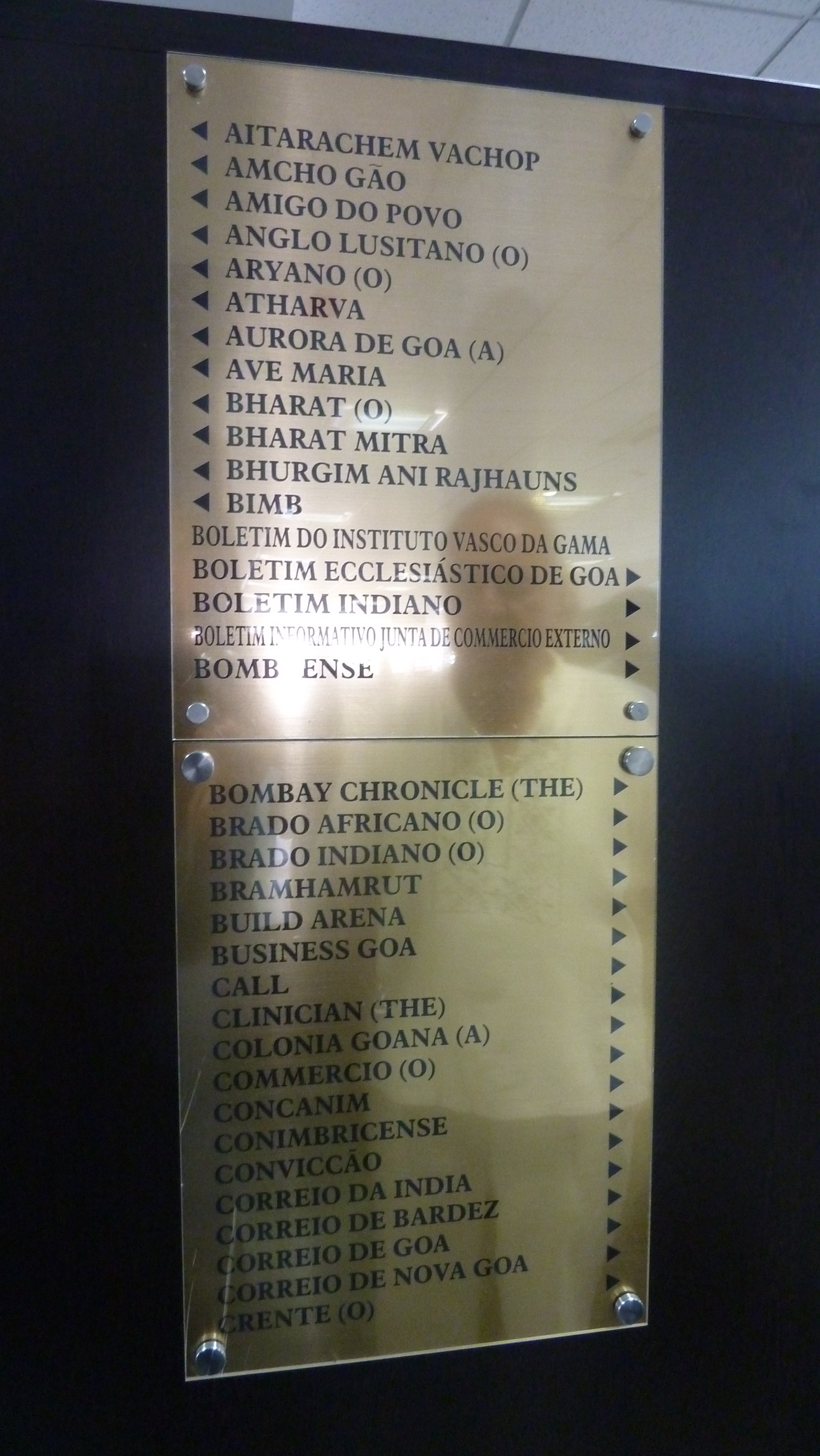
Portuguese-era newspapers.

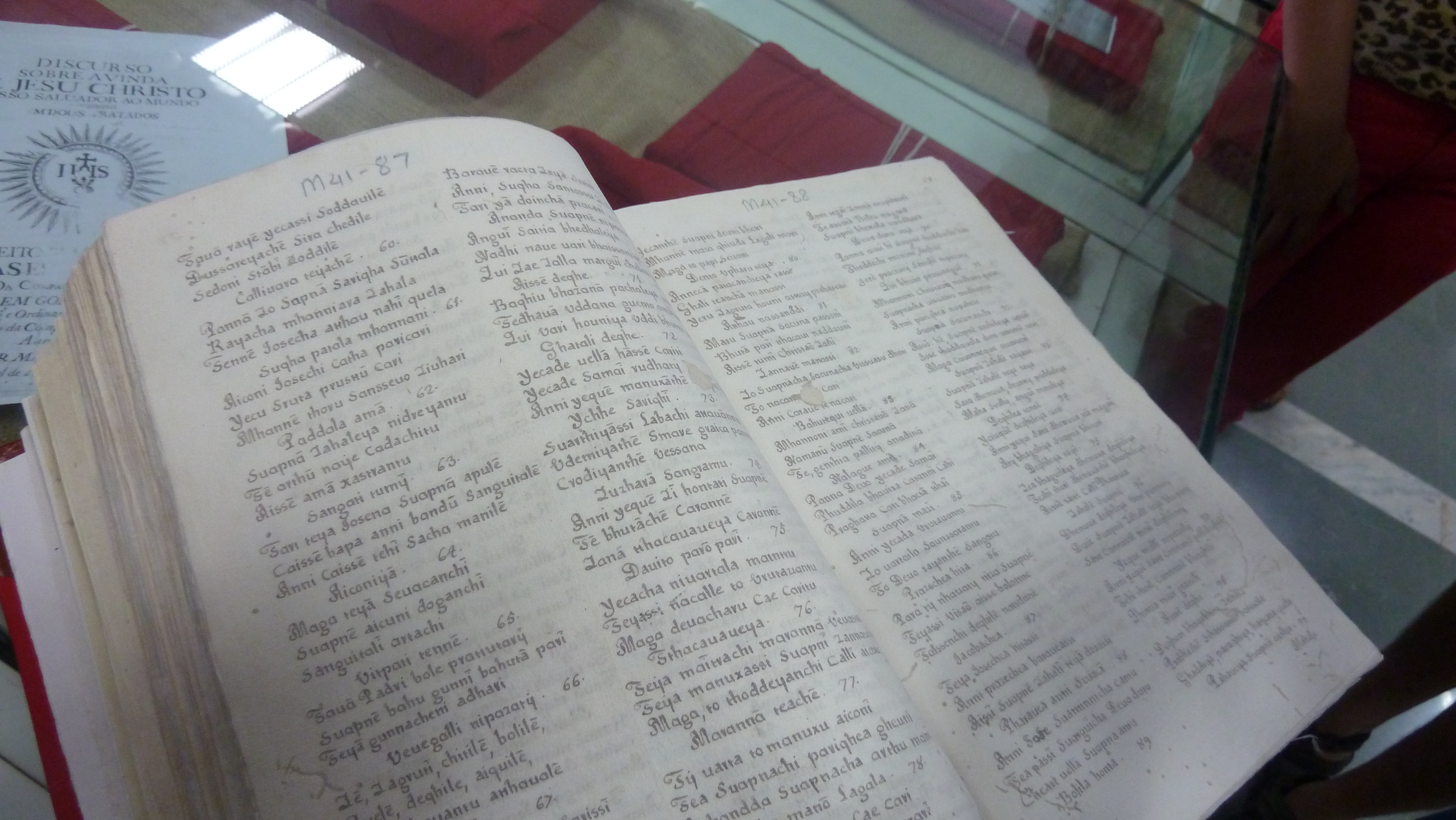
Hand-written version of Krista Purana.

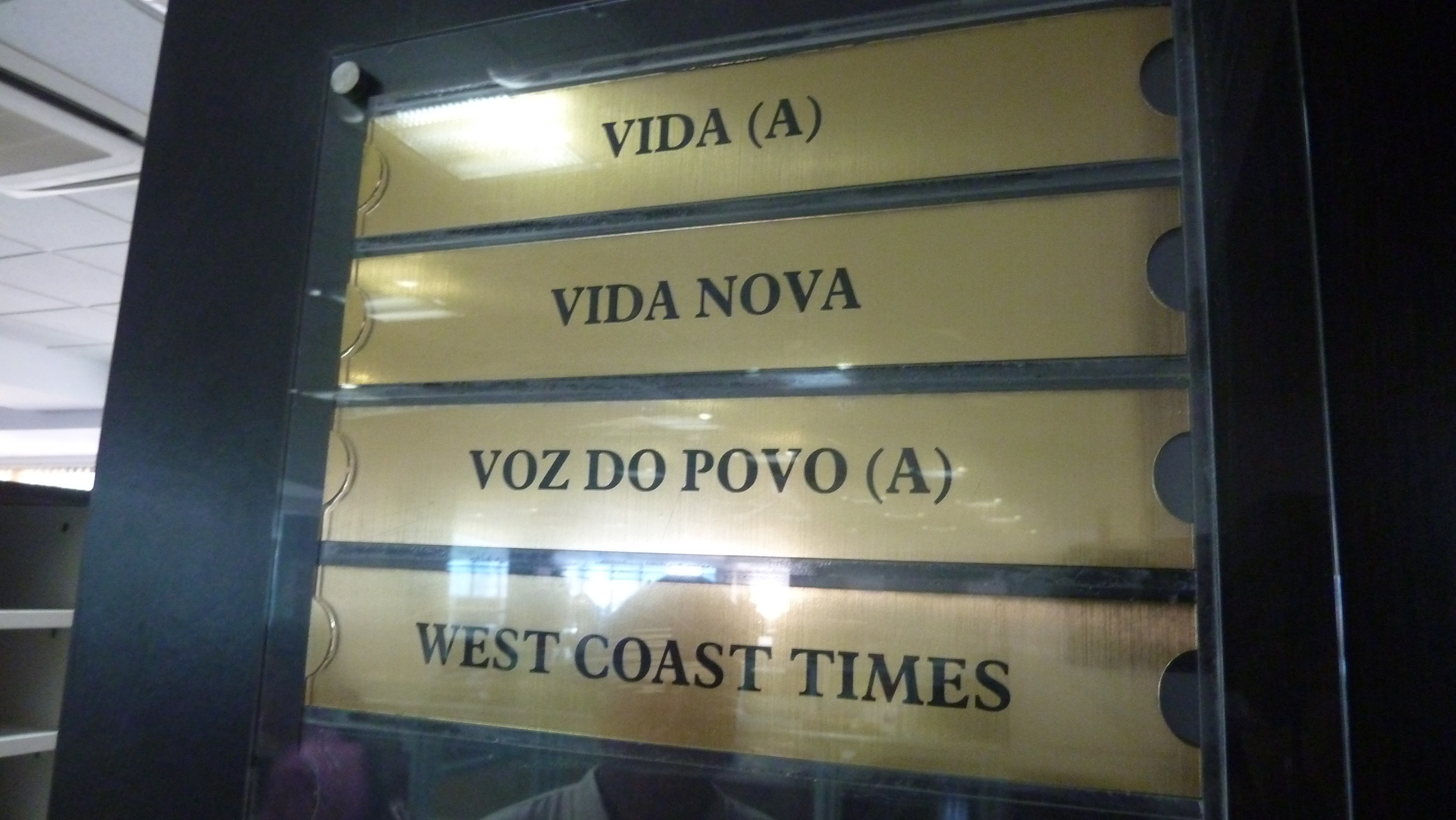
Newspapers, old and not so old.

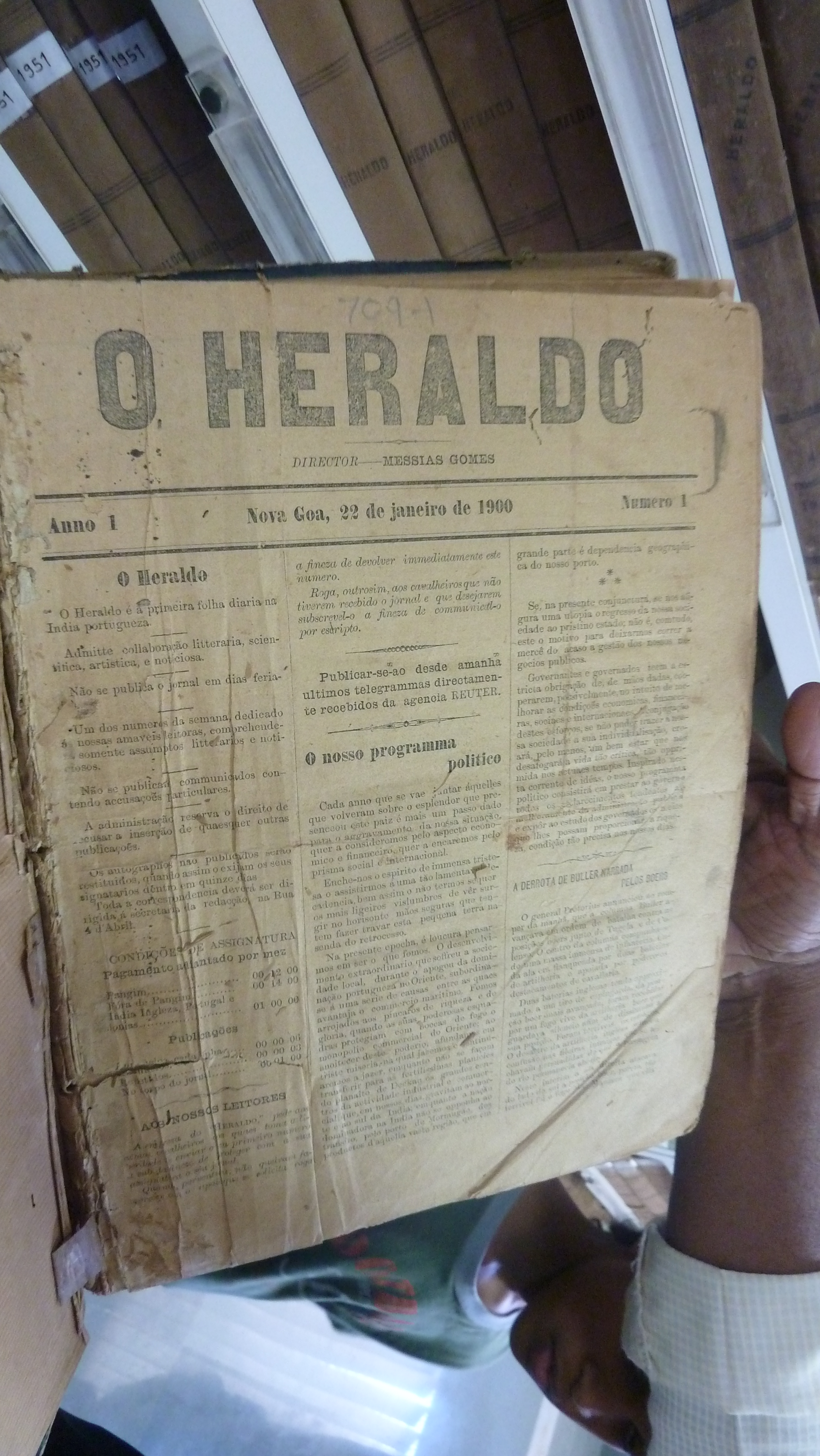
Vol 1 Issue 1 of Goa's oldest newspaper. O Heraldo. Circa 1900. Kept at the library.

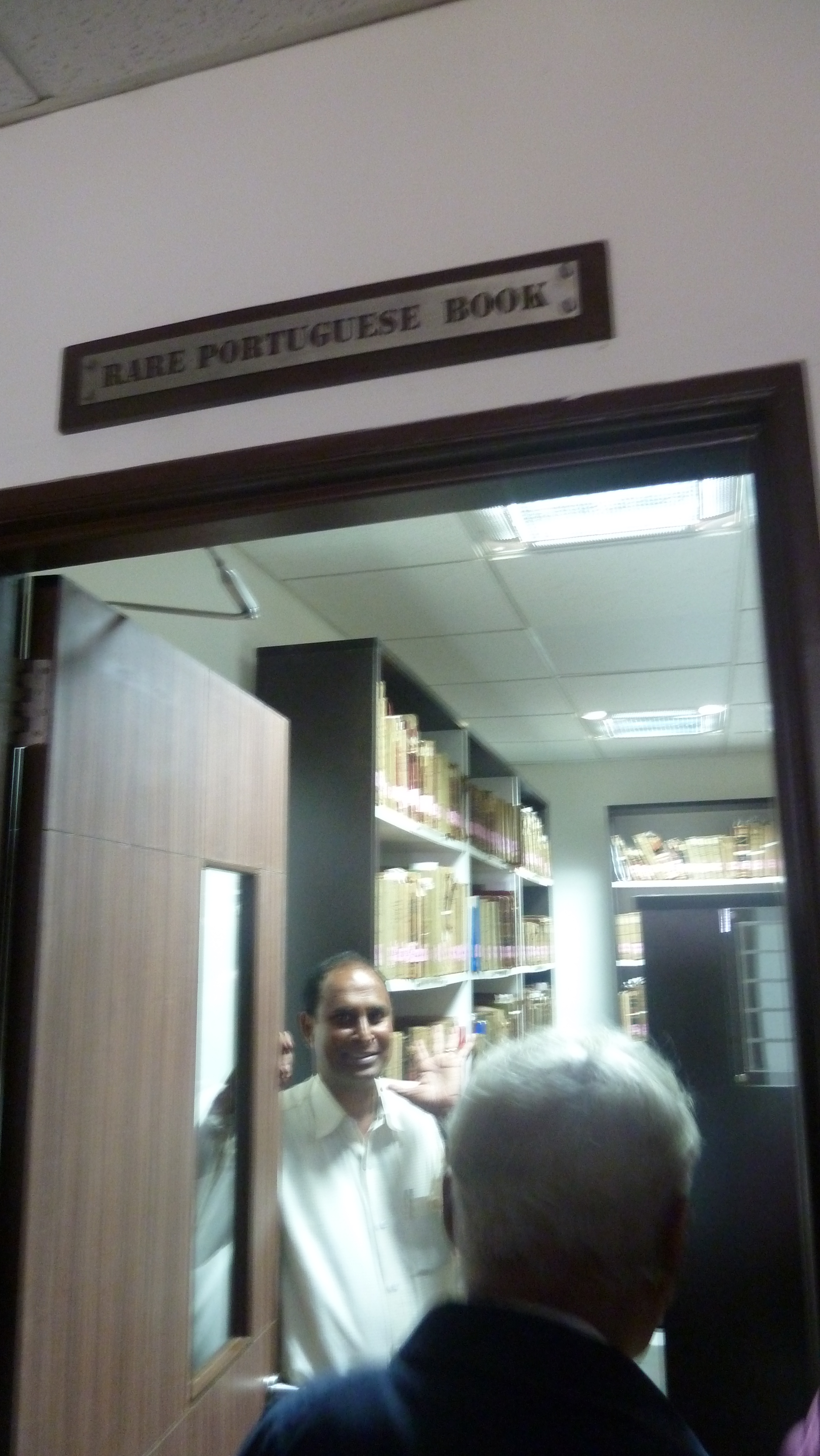
Rare Portuguese books.

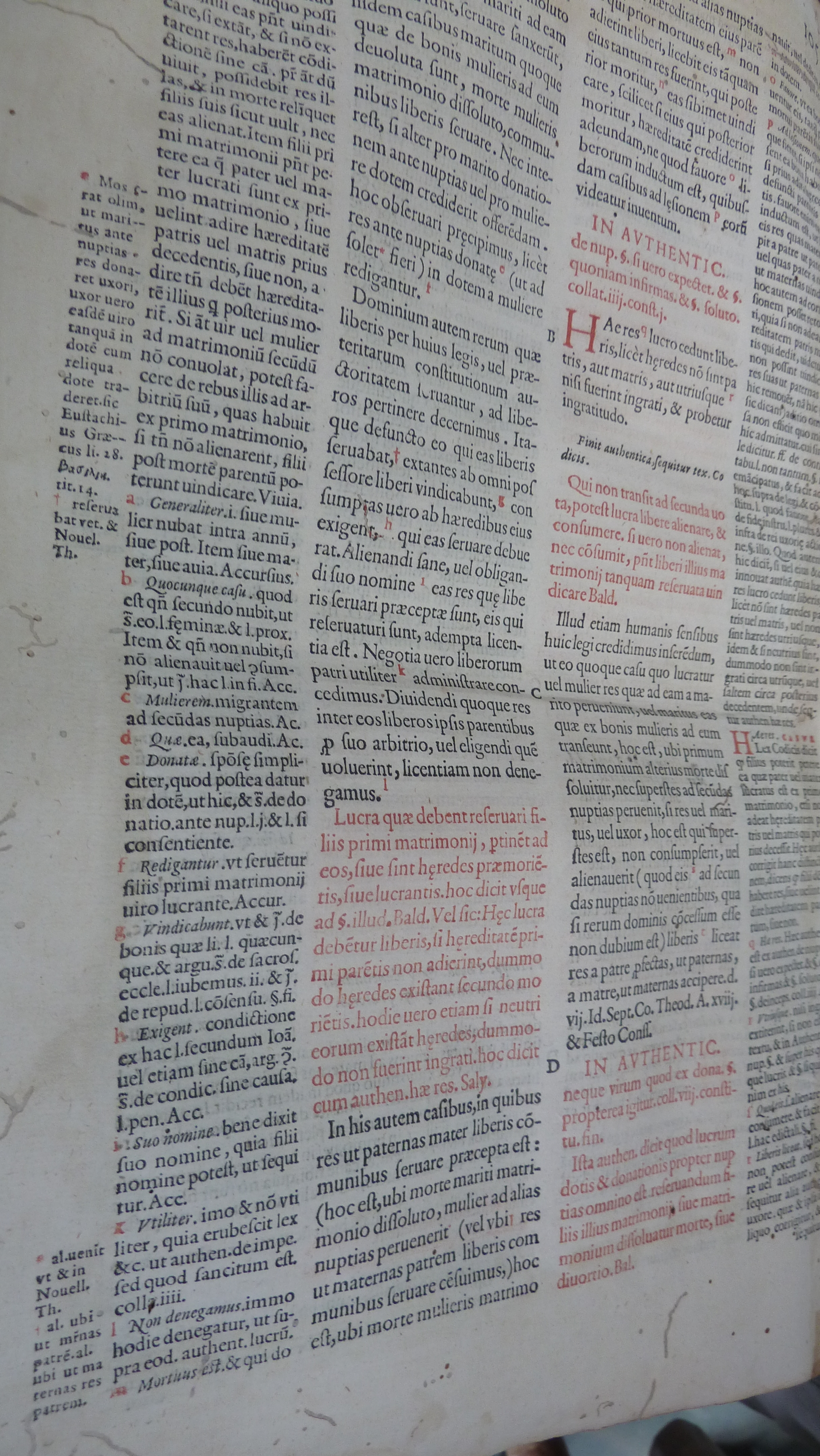
Four-and-half centuries old book.

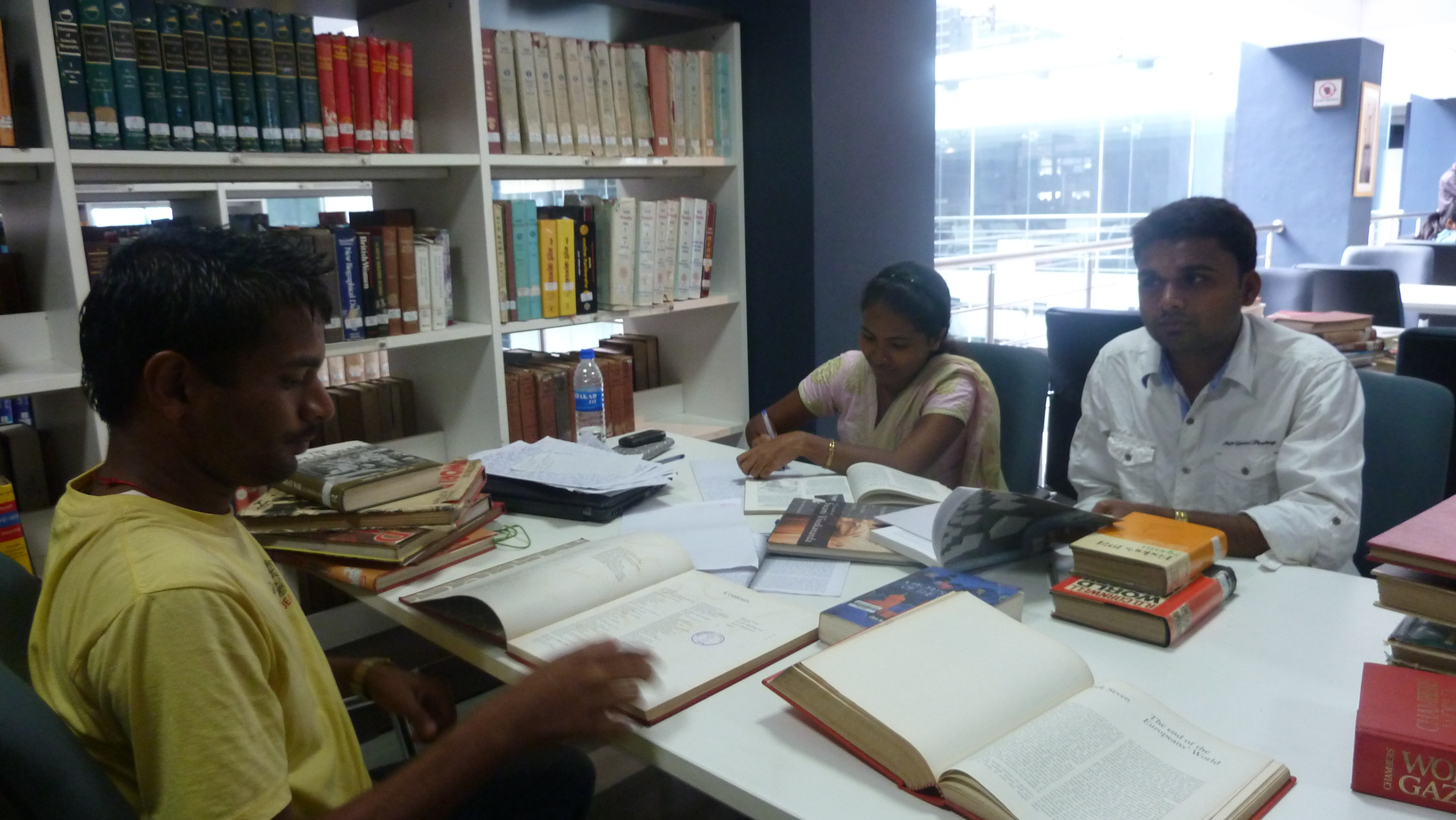
Readers at the library.

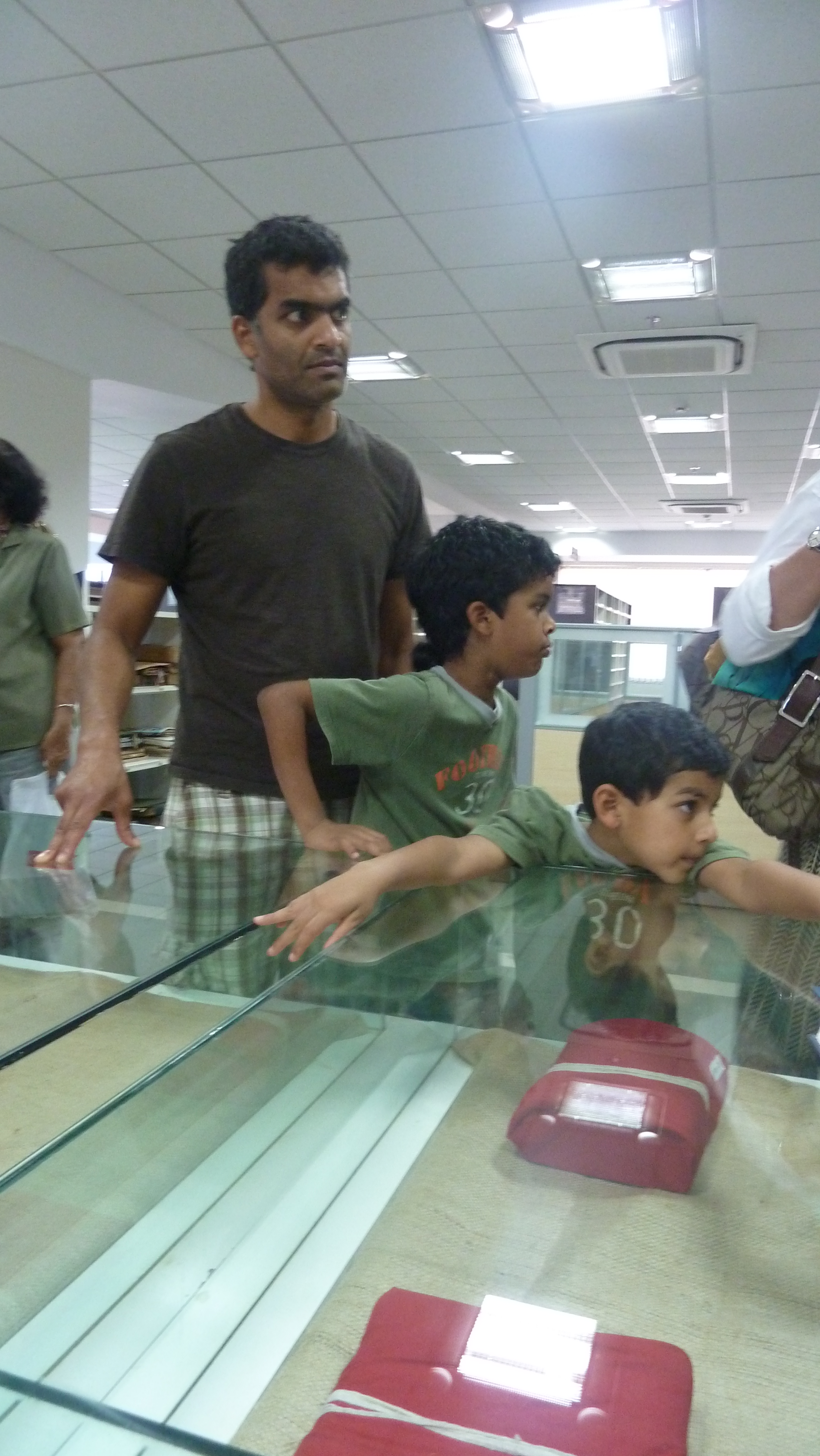
Children at the library.

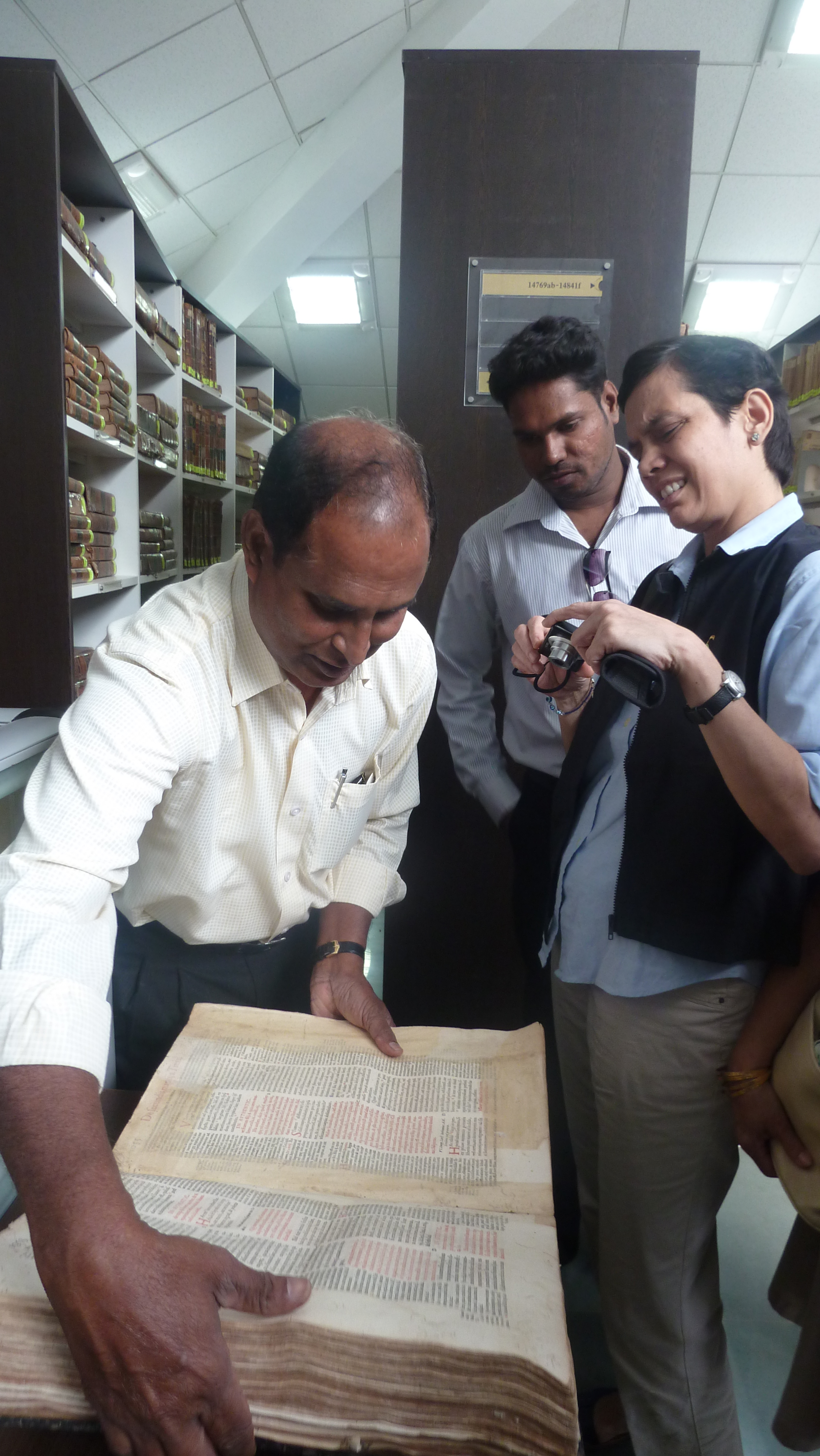
Four-and-half centuries book.

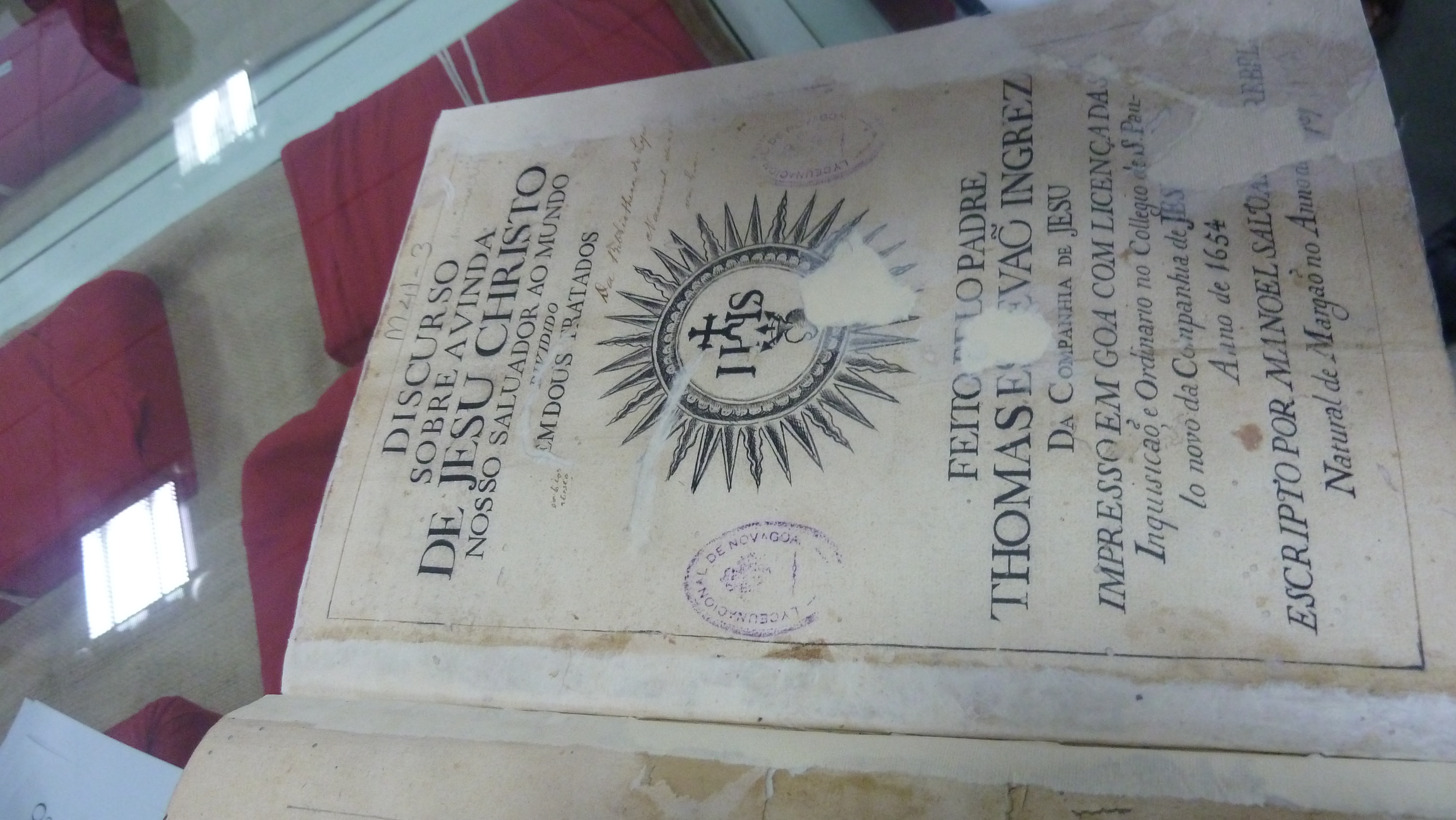
Krista Purana.

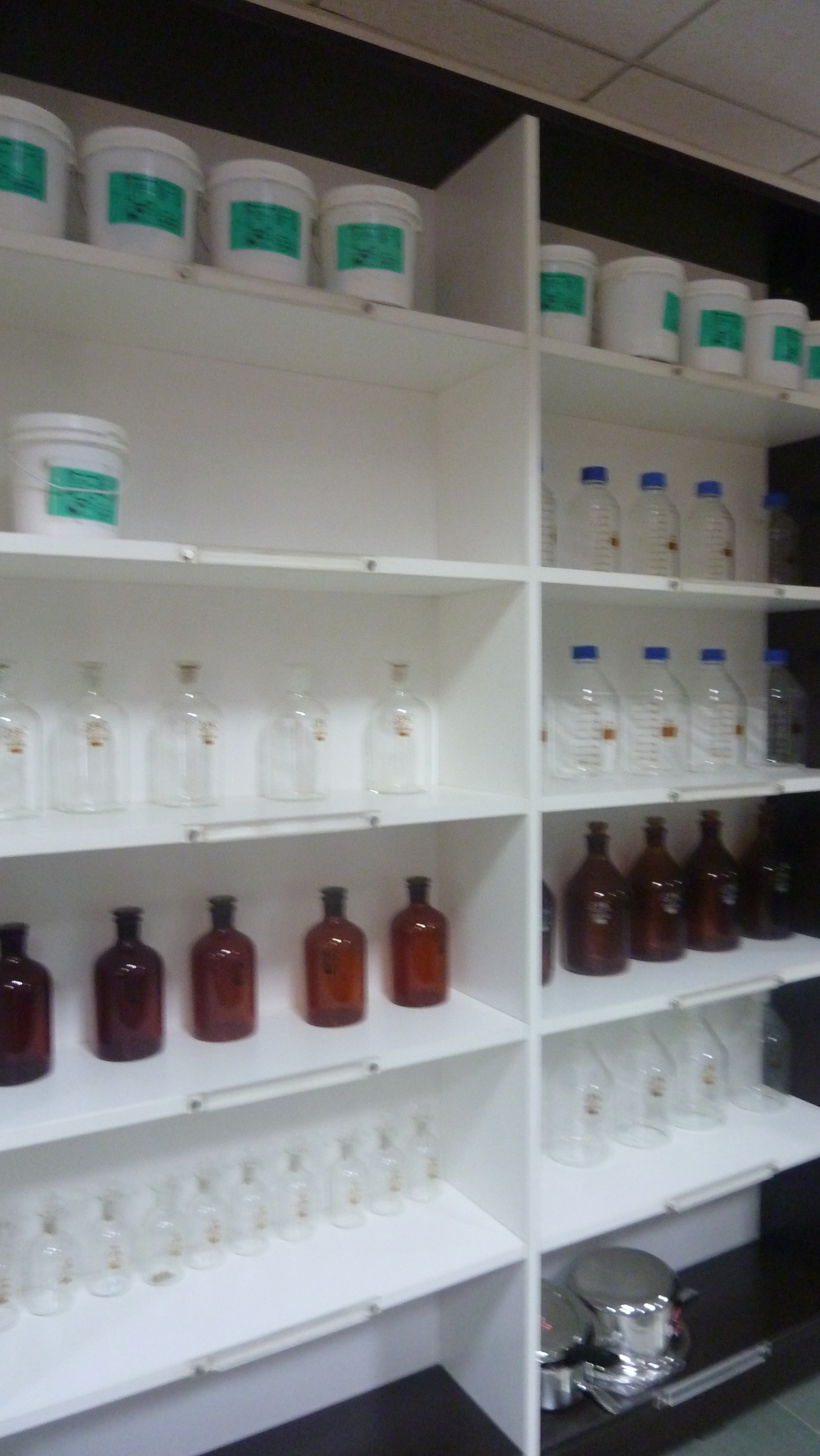
Restoration and preservation.

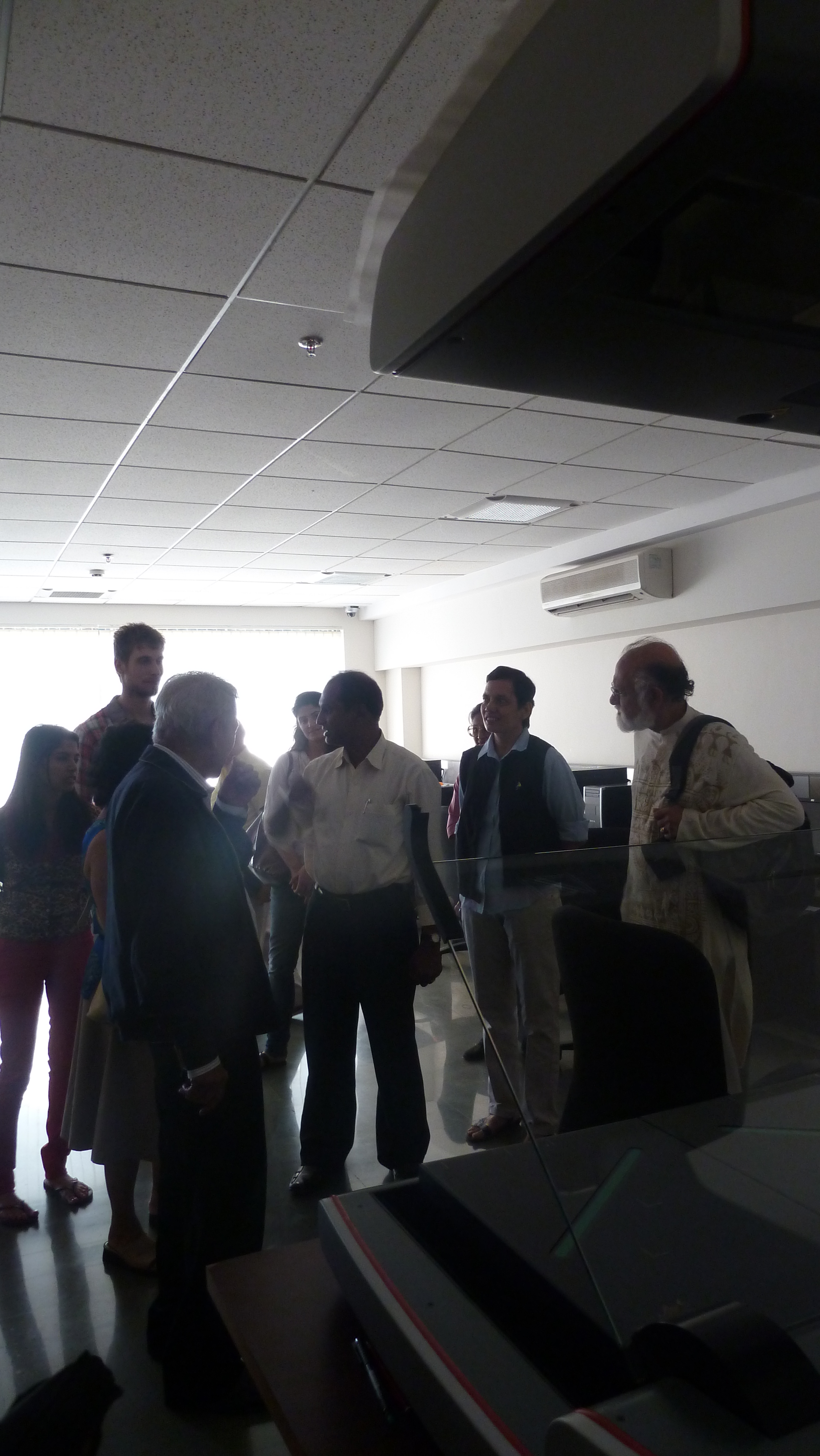
Full-page scanning facilities, broadsheets newspapers can be digitised here.

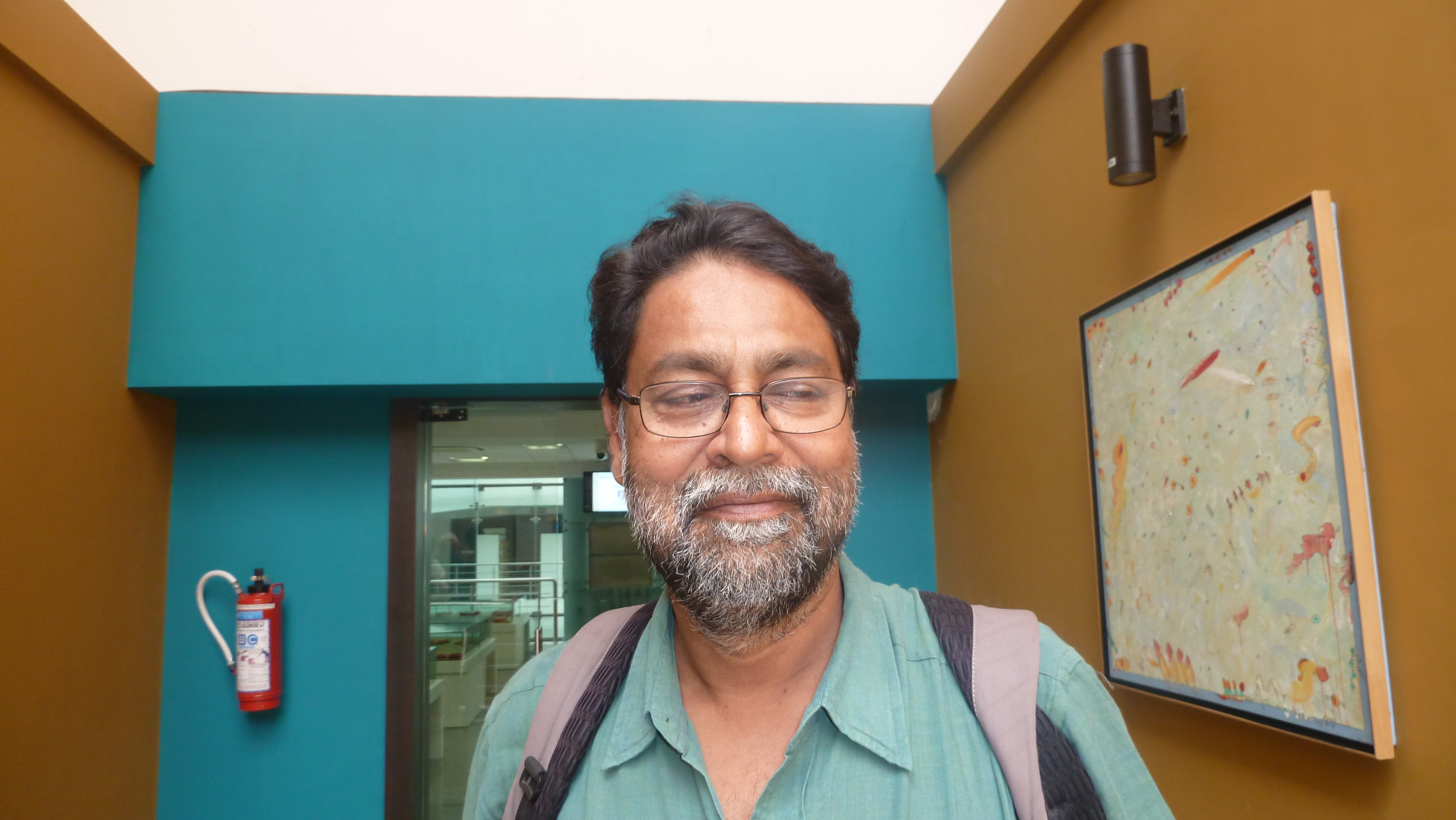
Architect Gerard da Cunha, whose team designed the library.

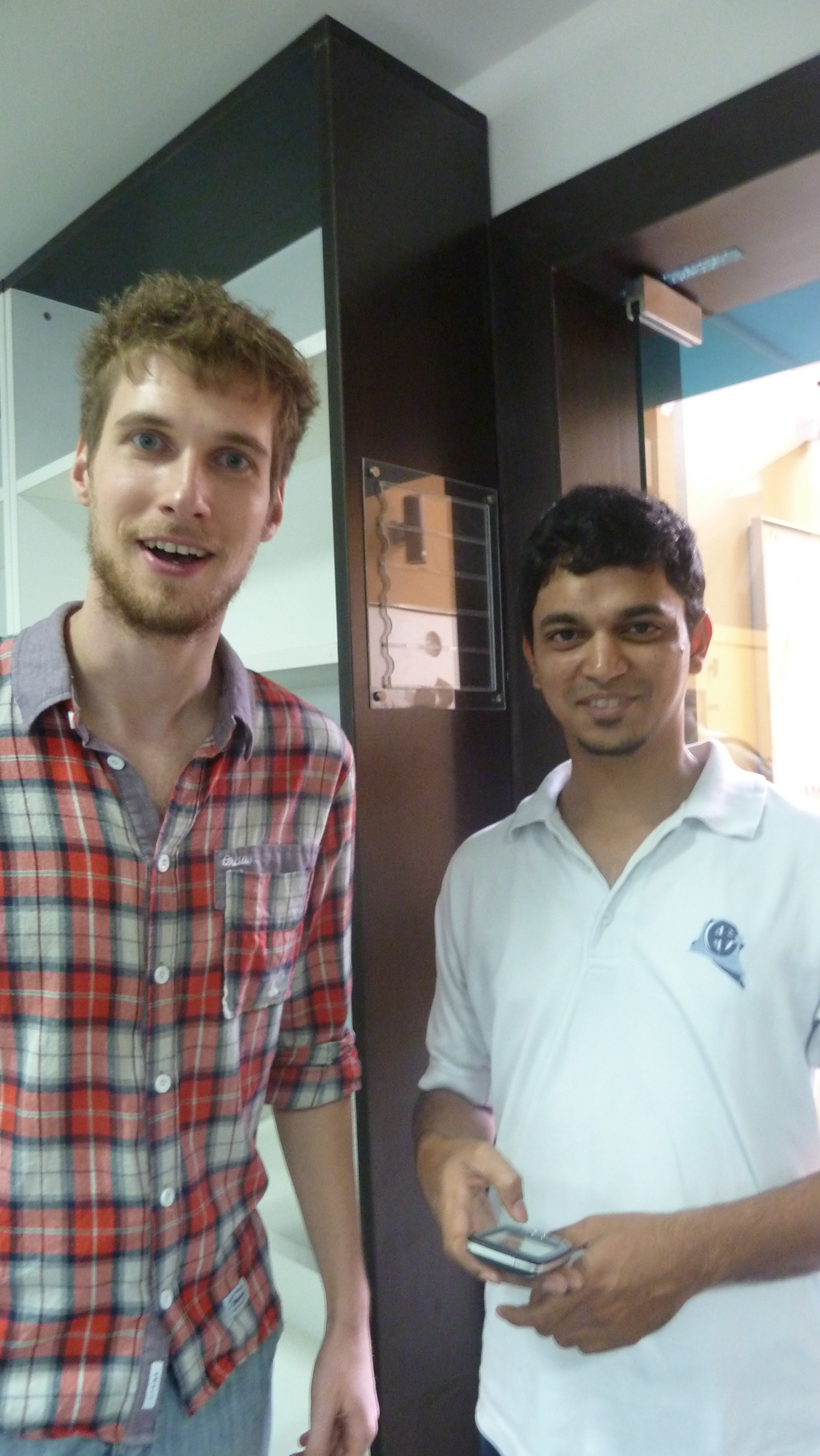
Young readers. Dutch scholar and journalist Nigel Britto.

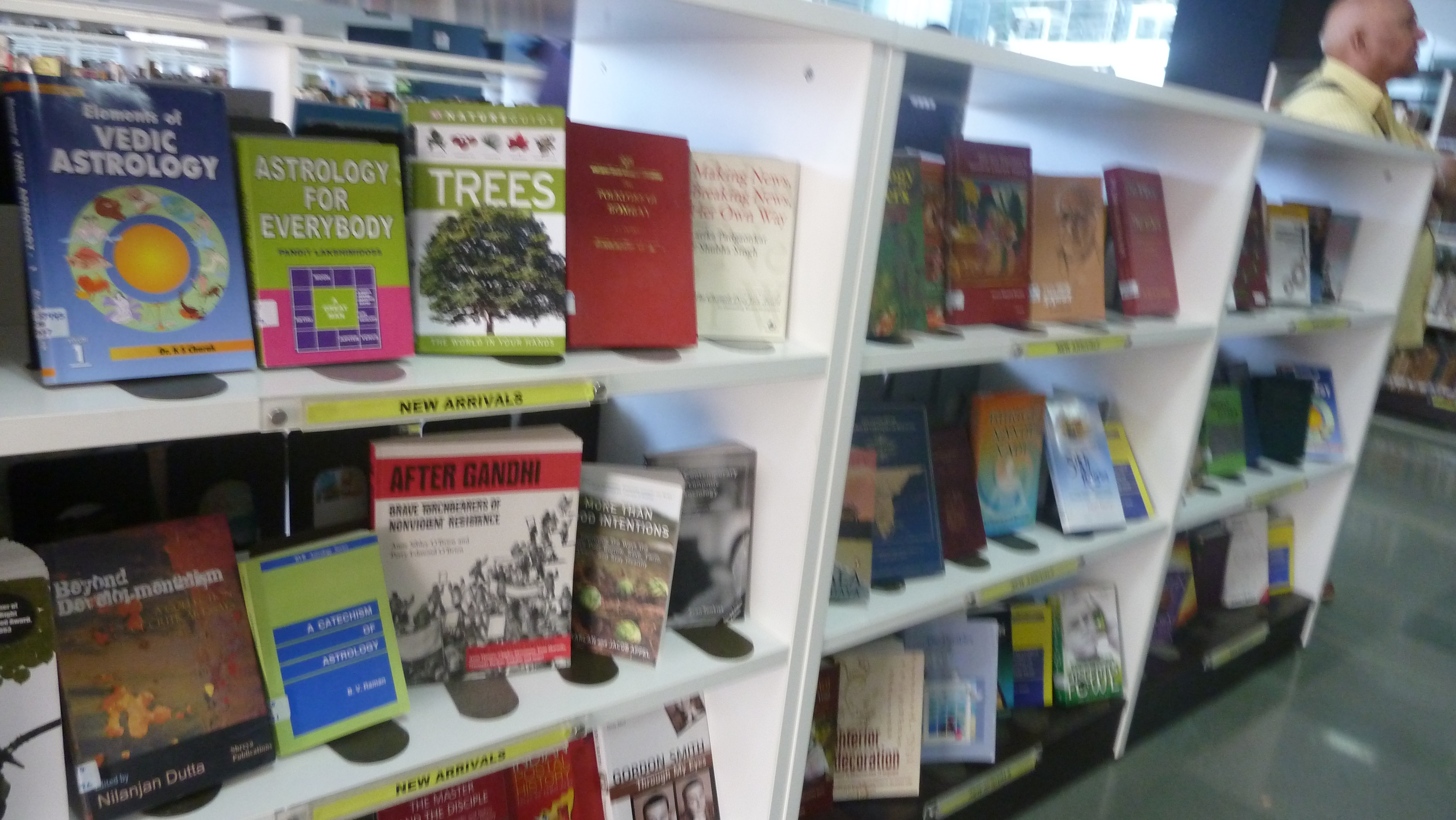
New arrivals.

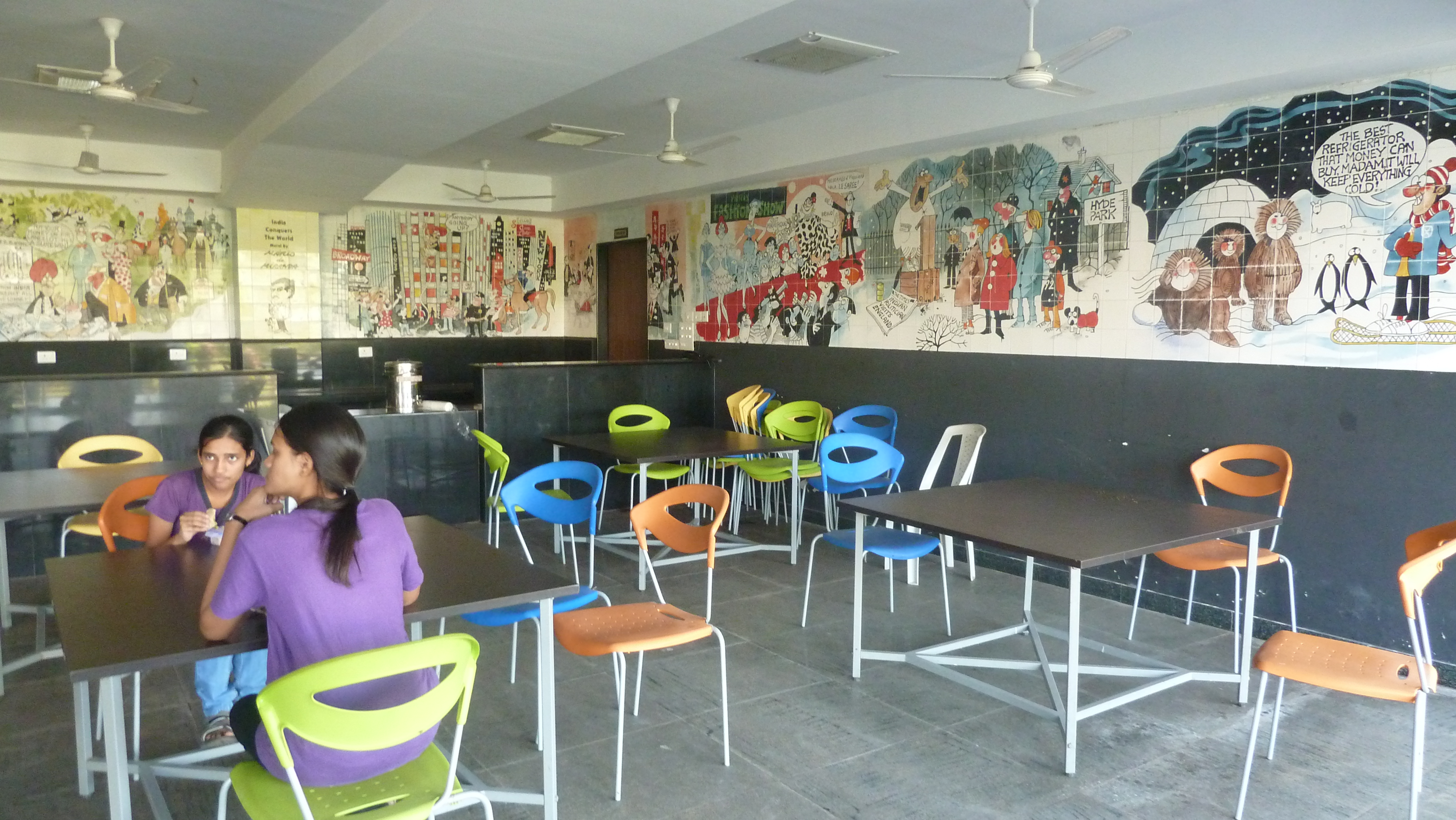
The canteen.

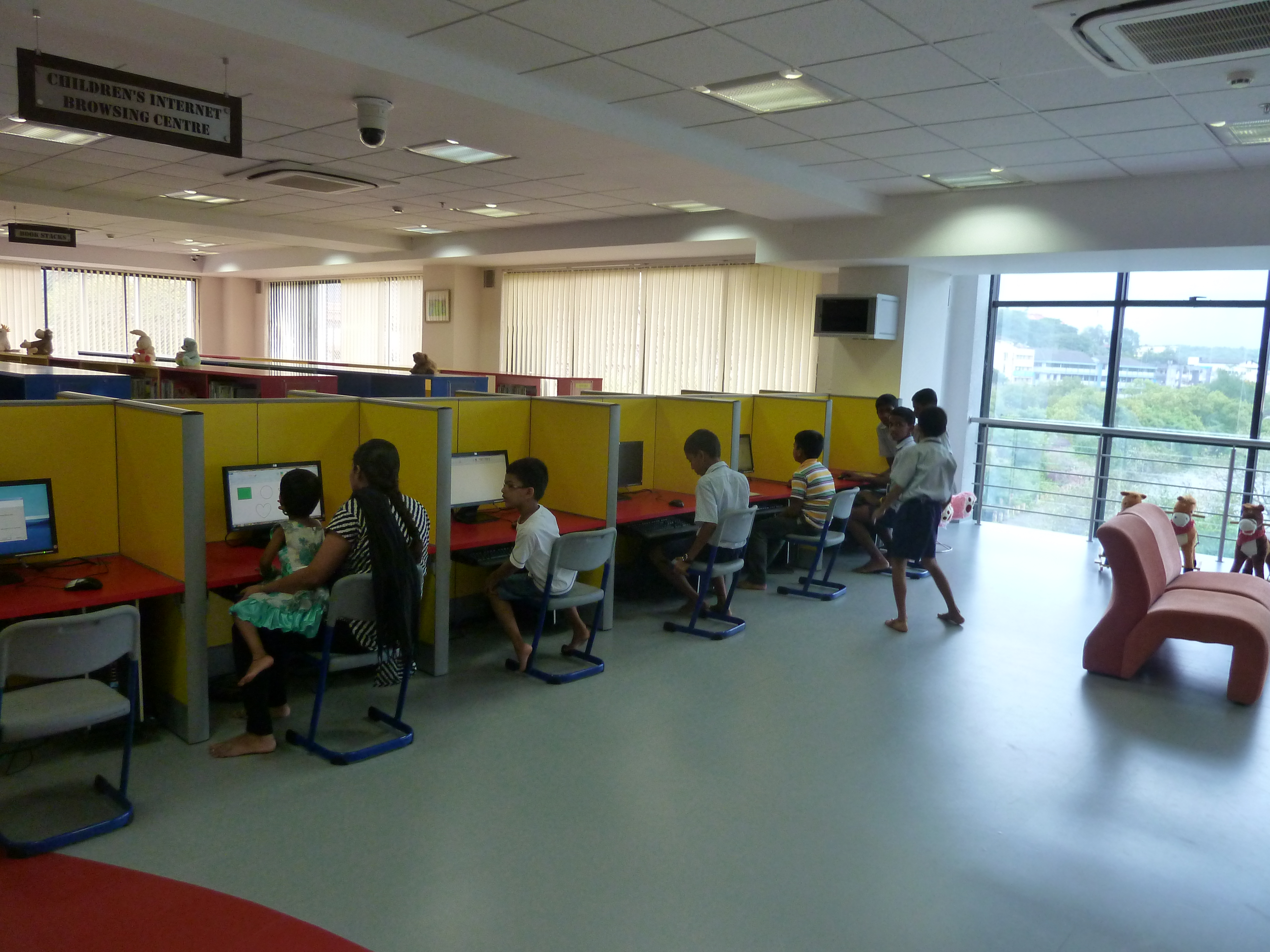
Children's section on the second floor.

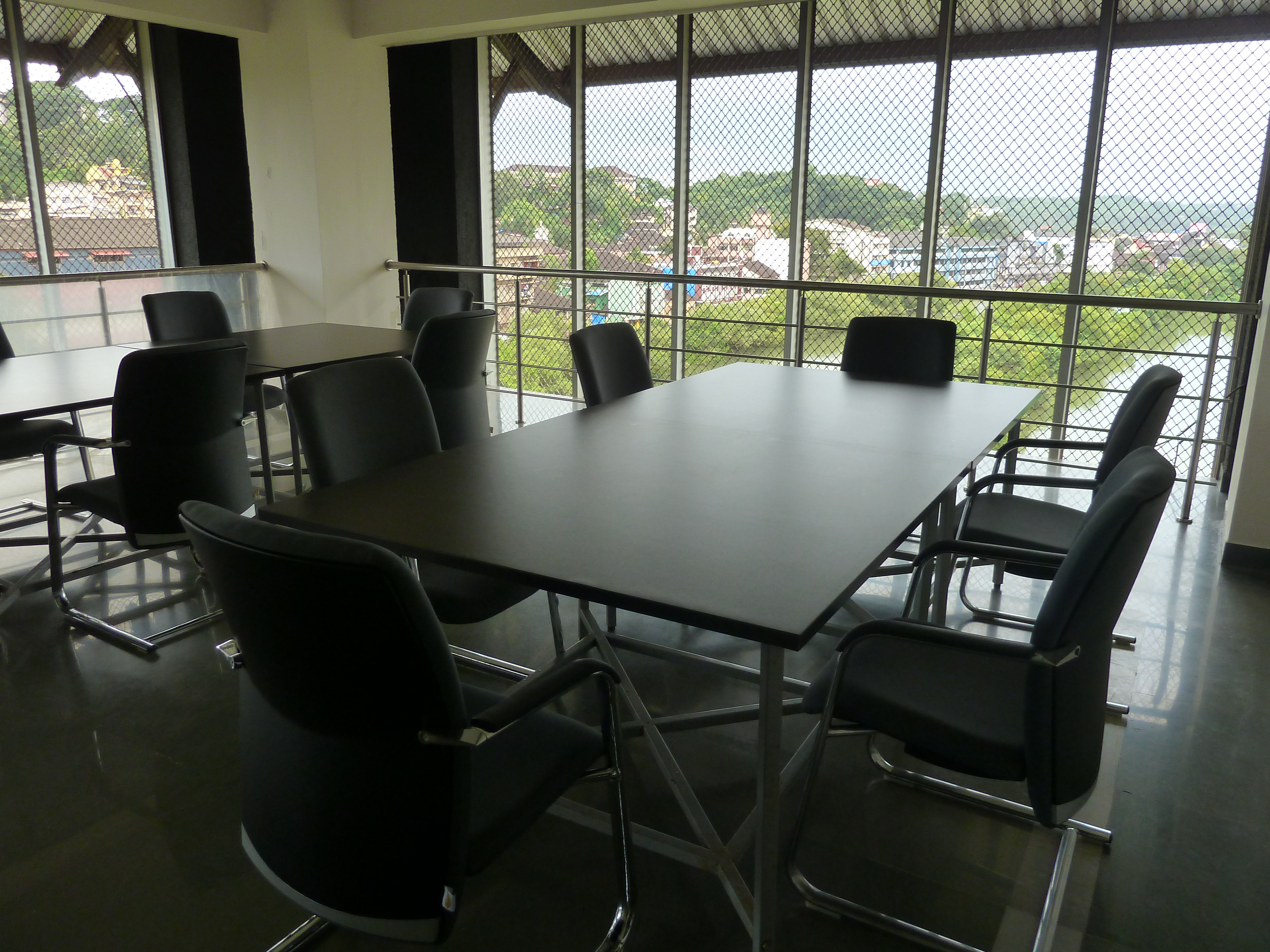
Reading gallery, overlooking capital Panjim.

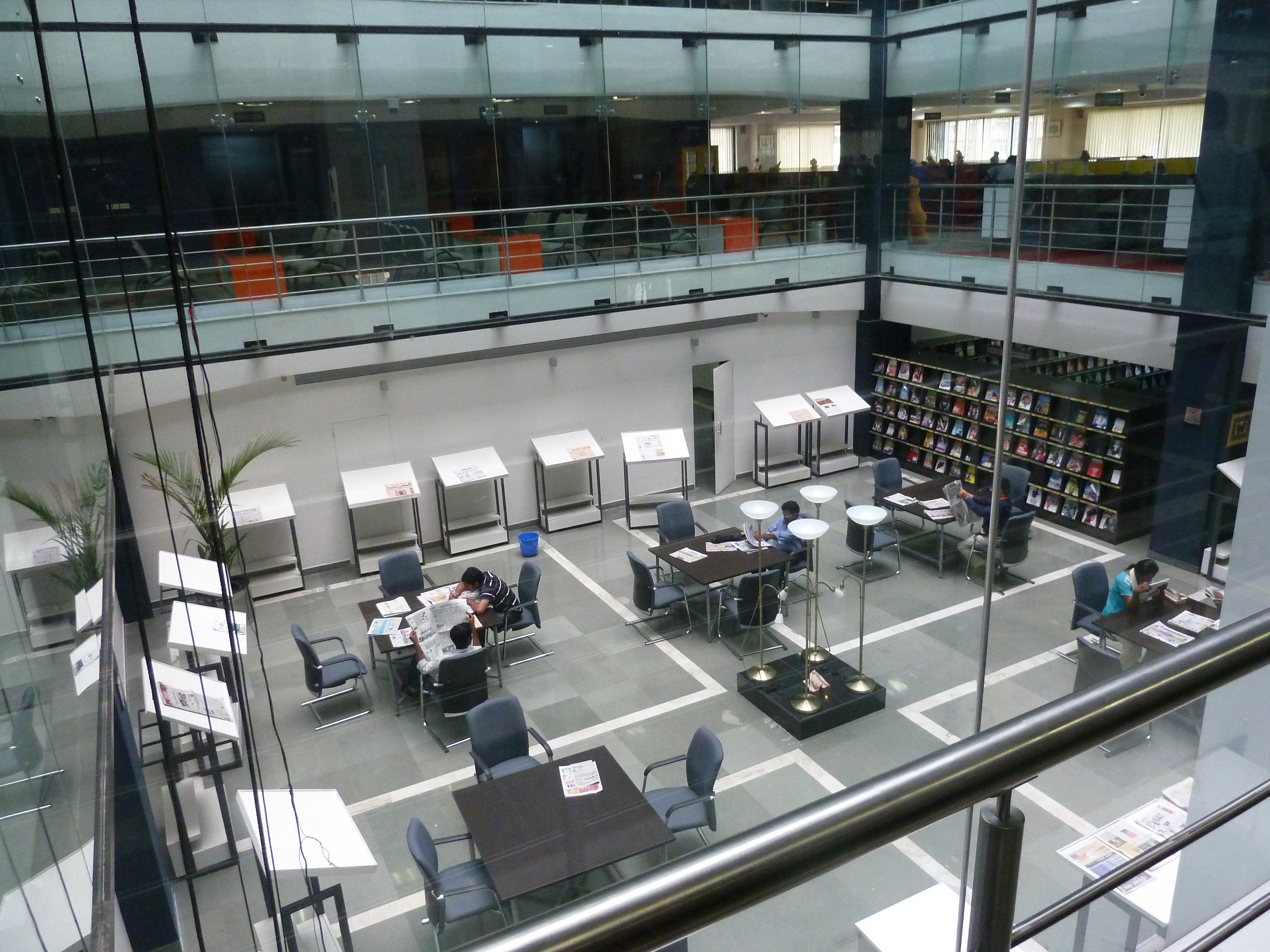
The magazine section, which is widely popular.

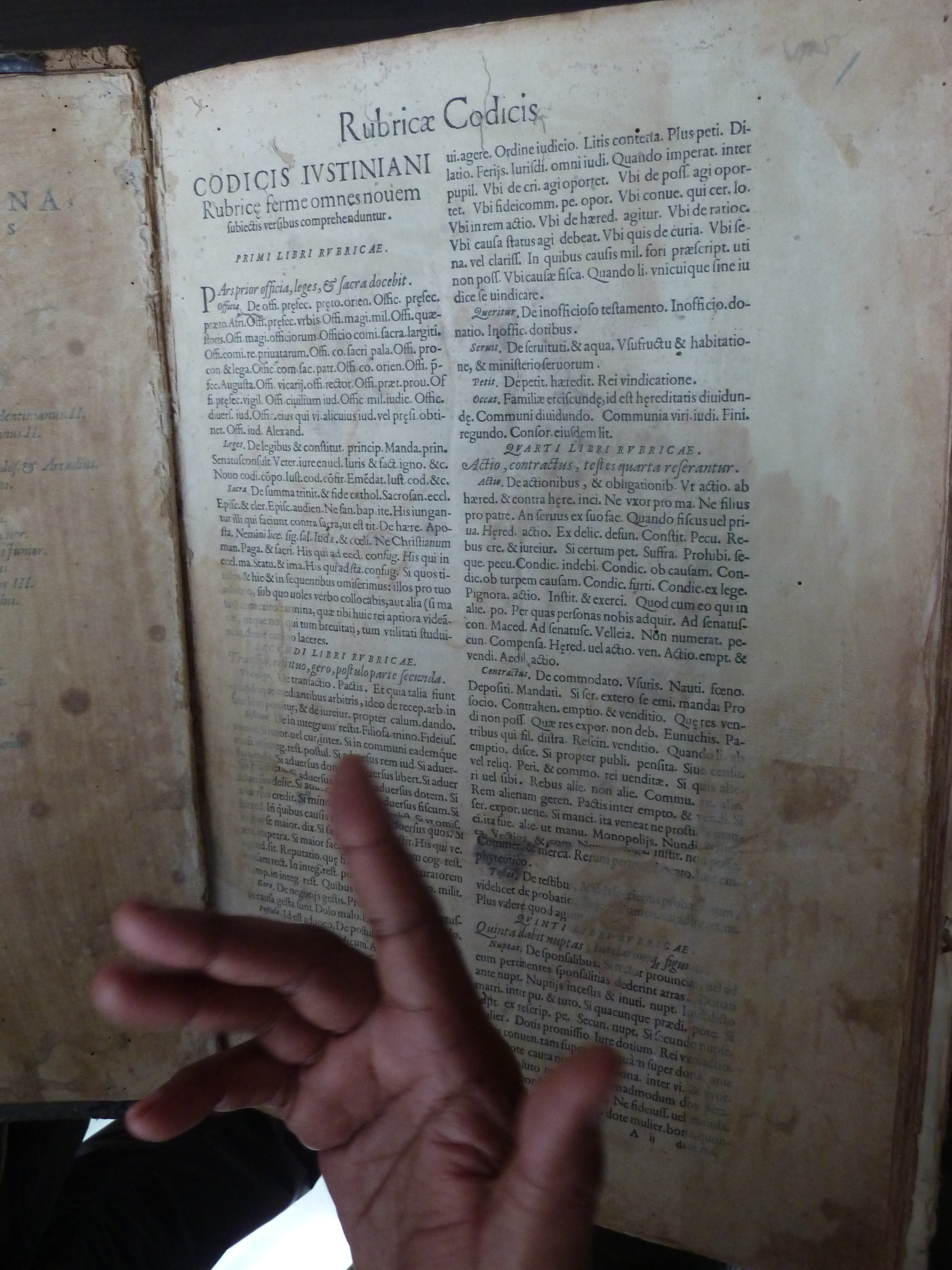
The library's oldest book, some five centuries old.

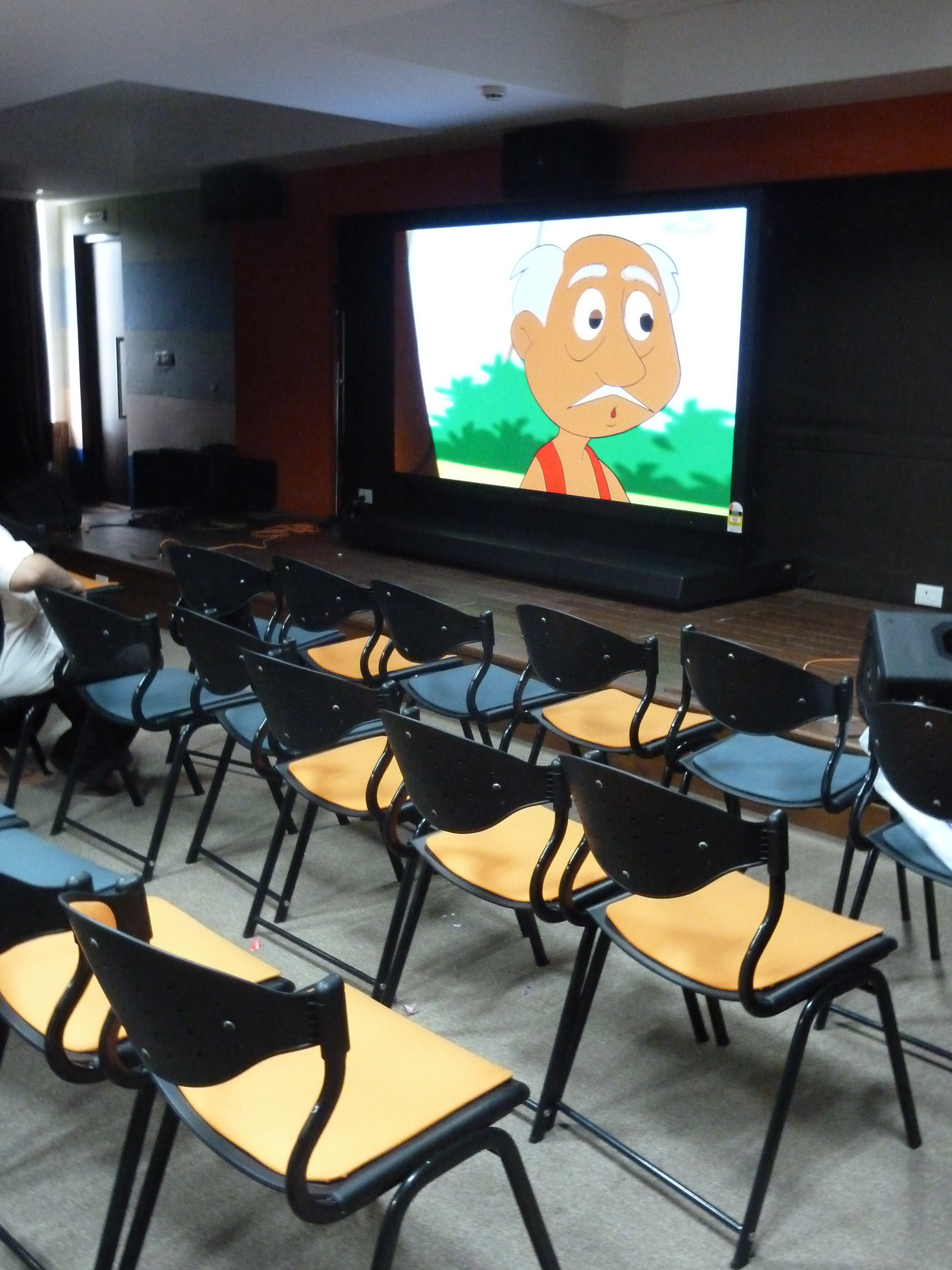
Auditorium and lecture-room

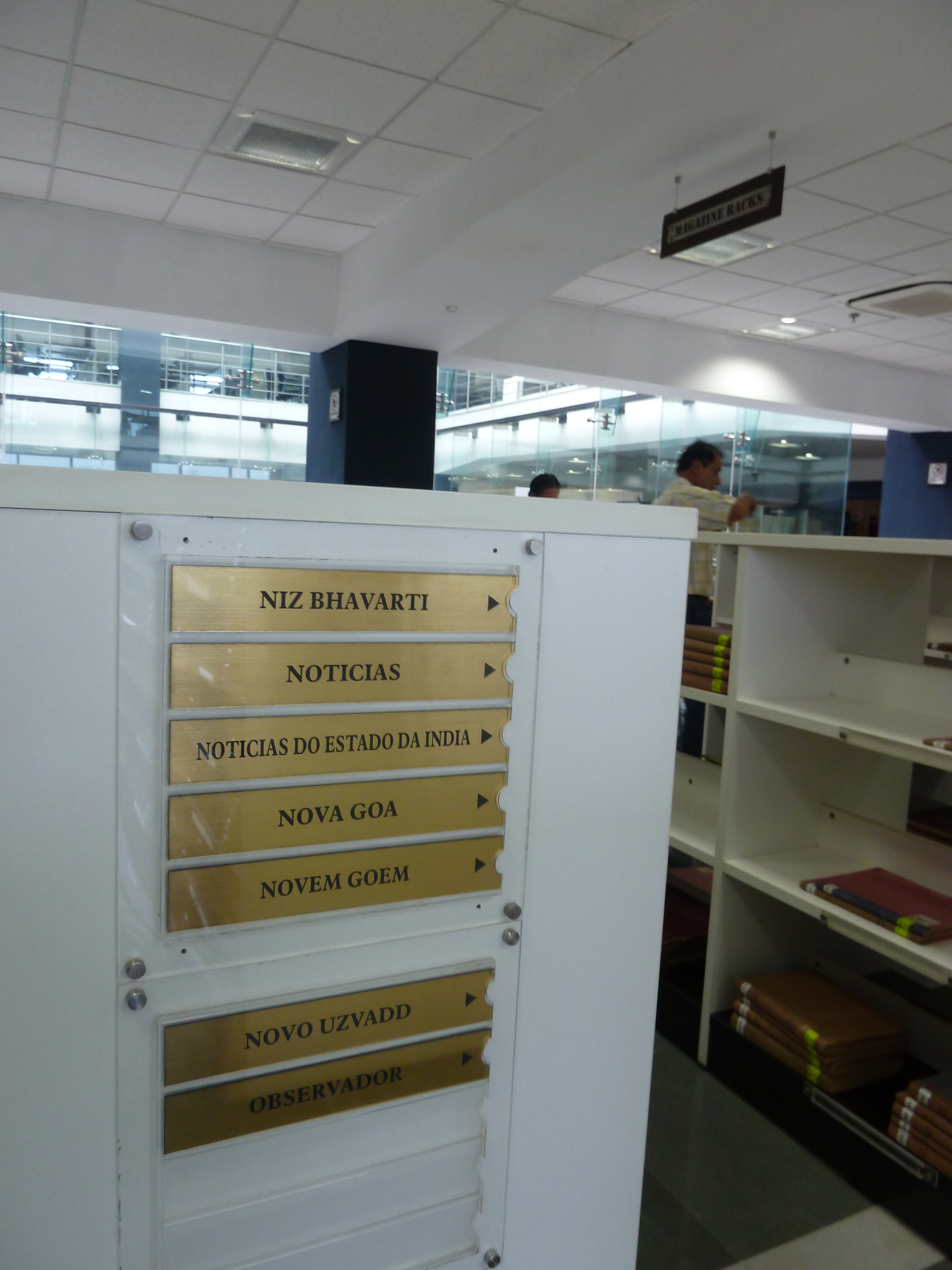
Goan and Portuguese newspapers.

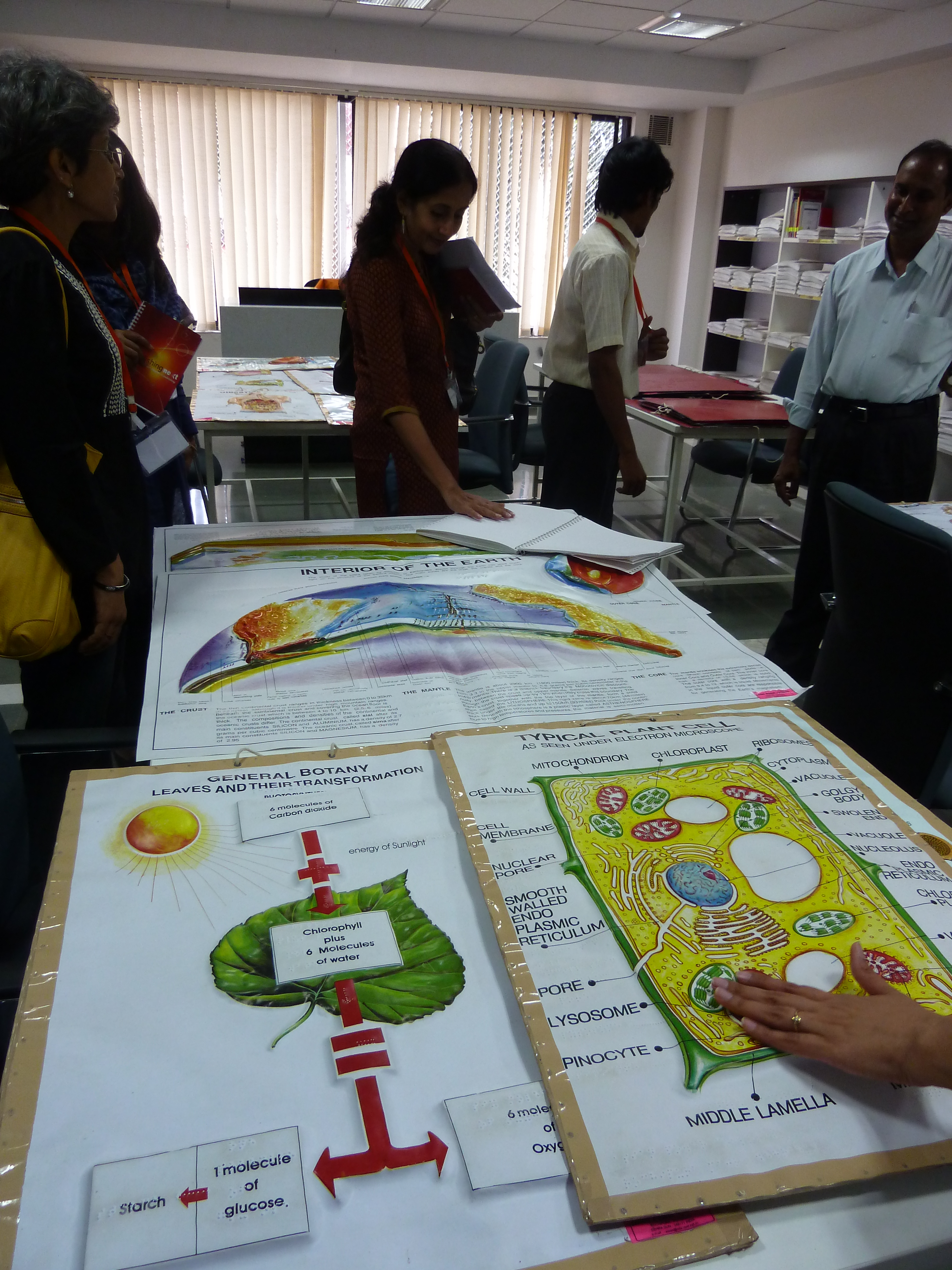
Braille section

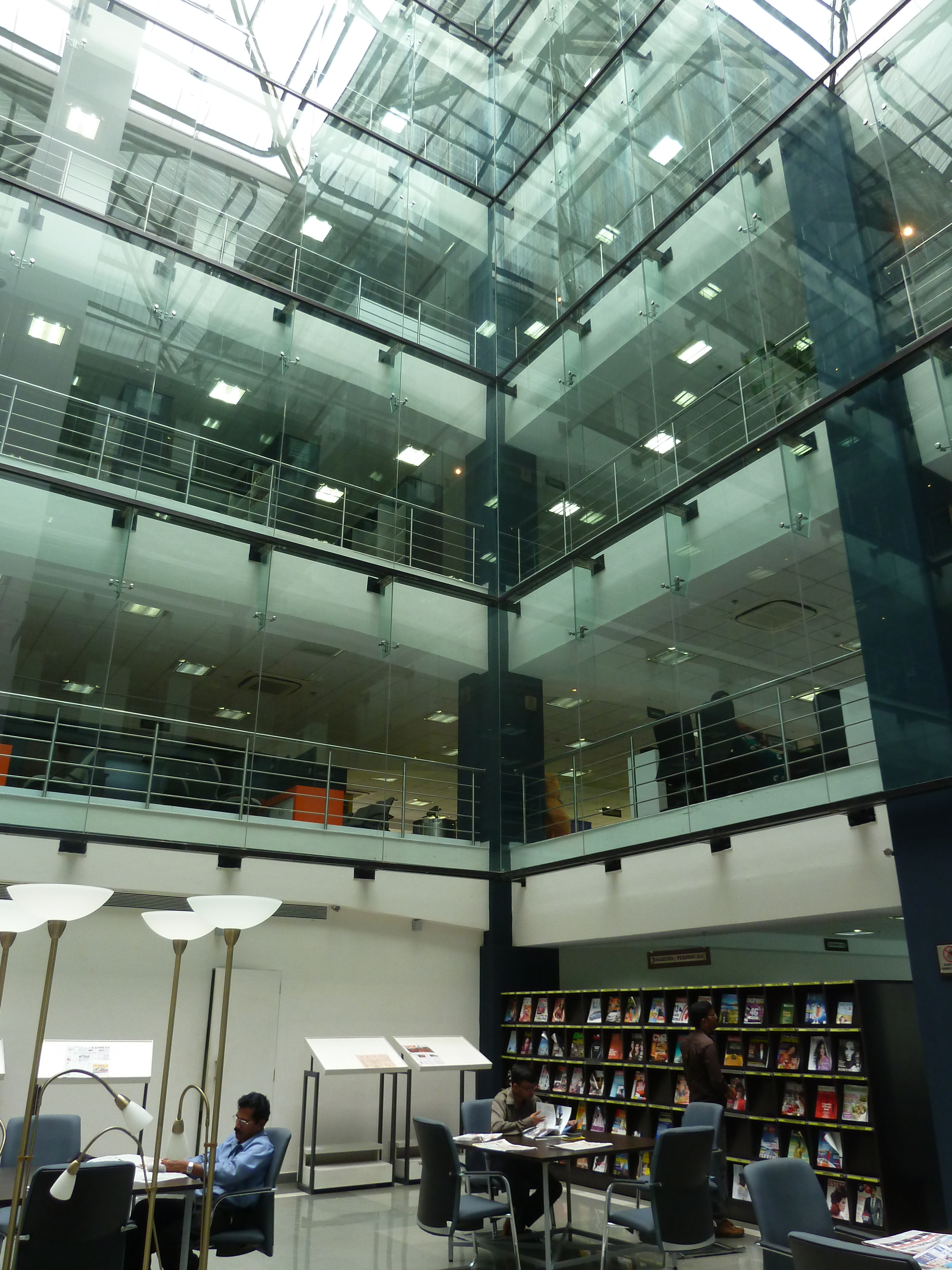
View of the library

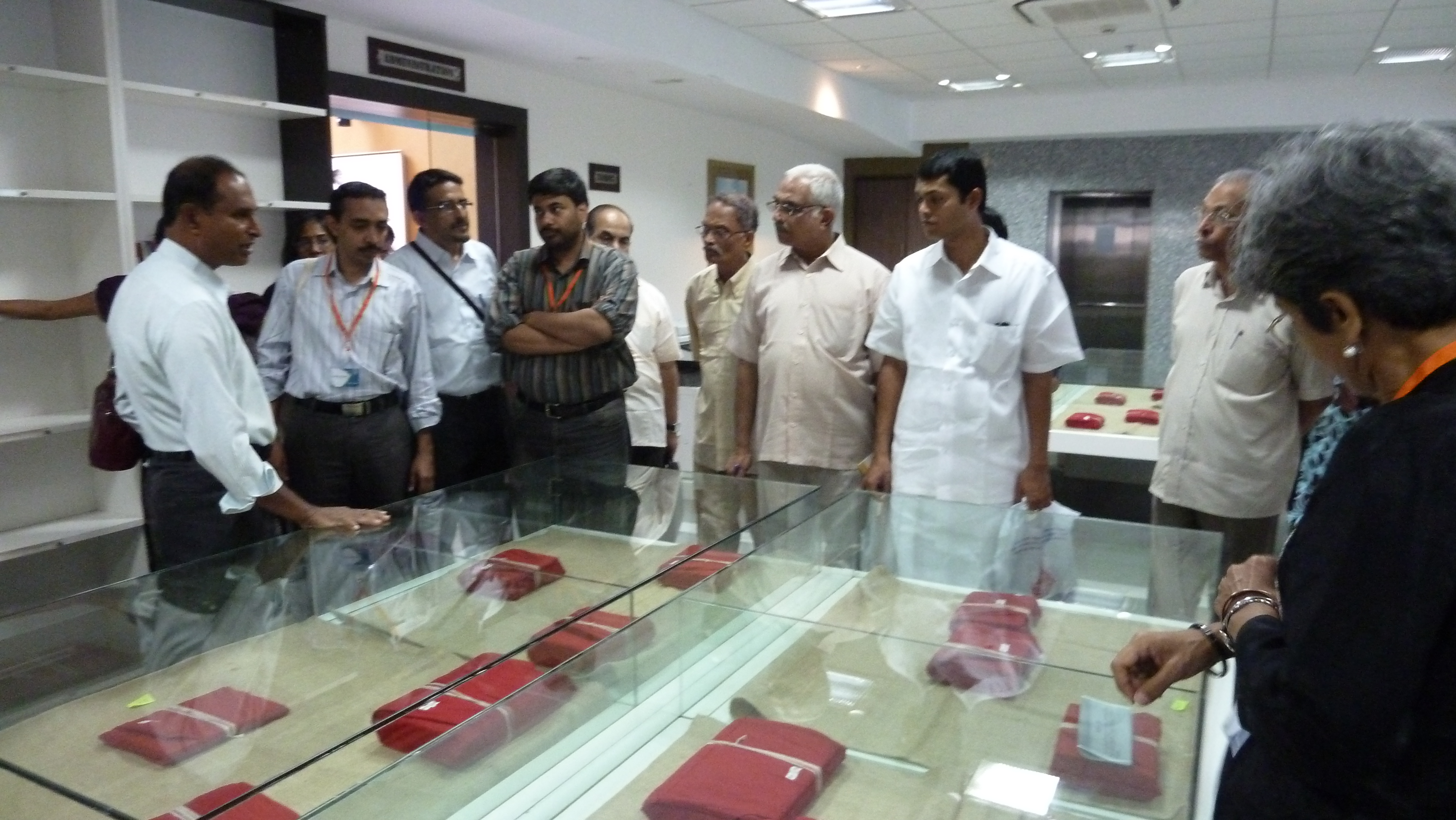
Curator Carlos Fernandes (left) shows valuable collections to visitors during PubNext 2012.

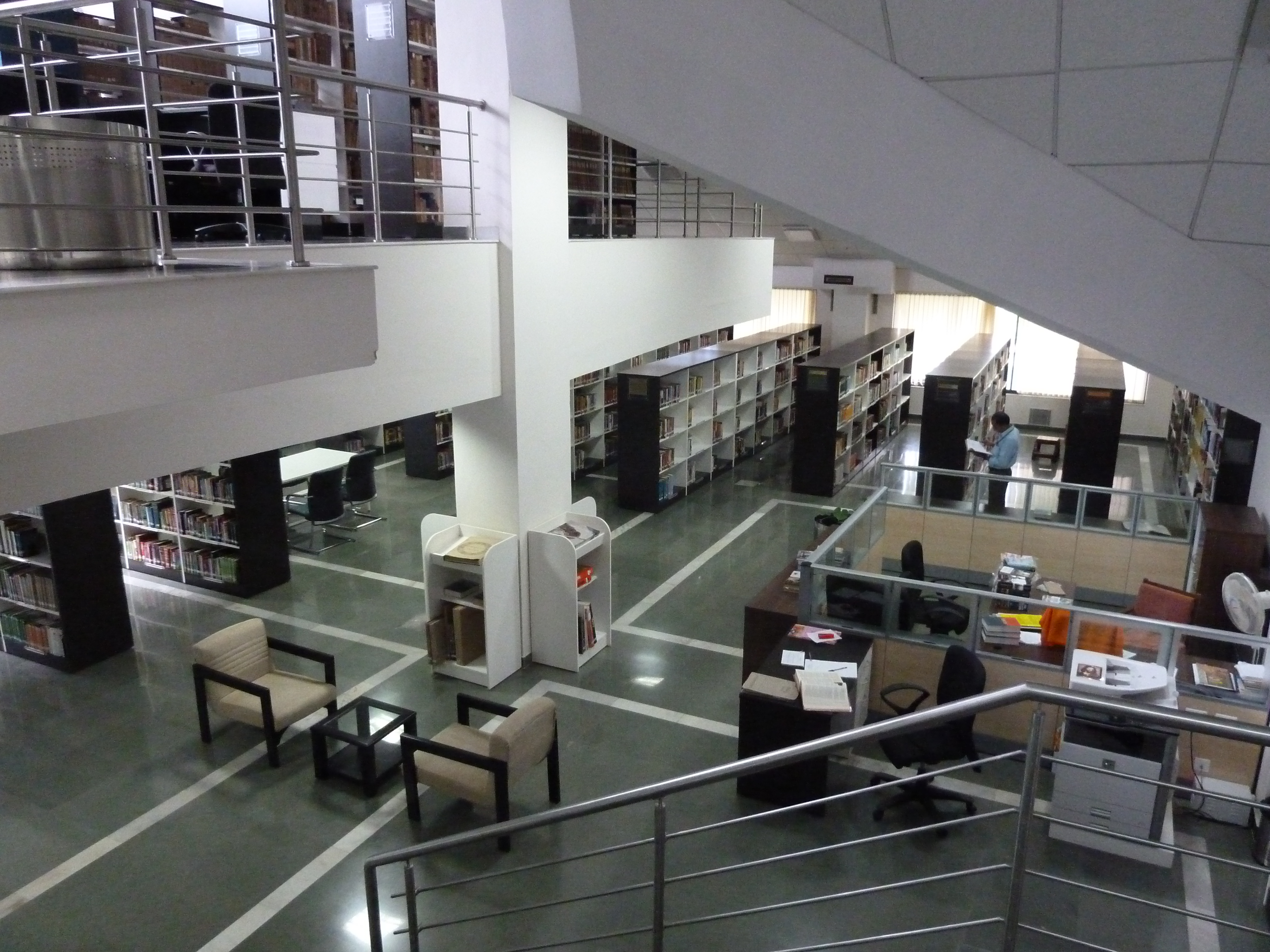
Holdings of the library. Seen on one of the six floors.

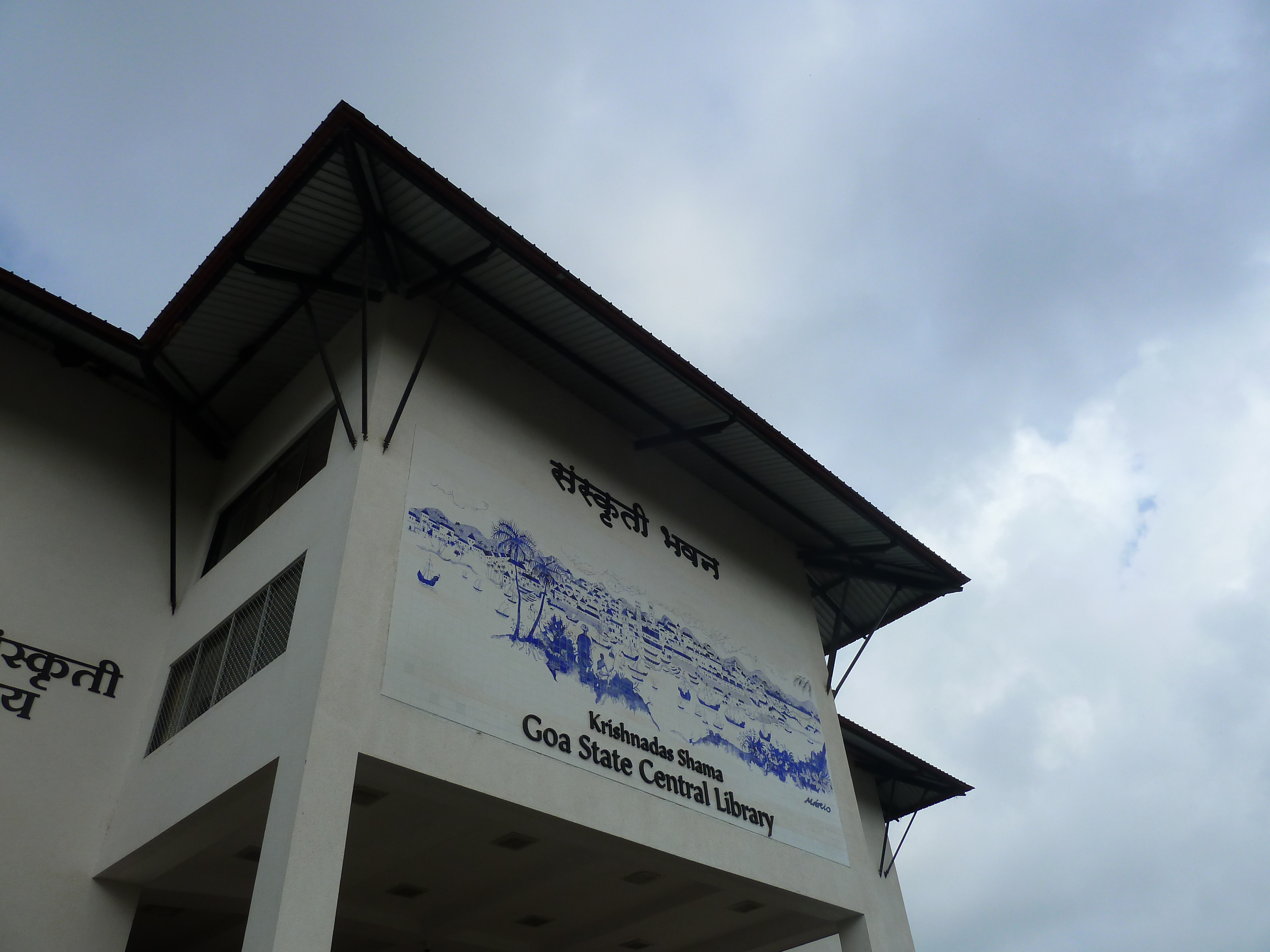
External view of the campus, Azulejos outside.

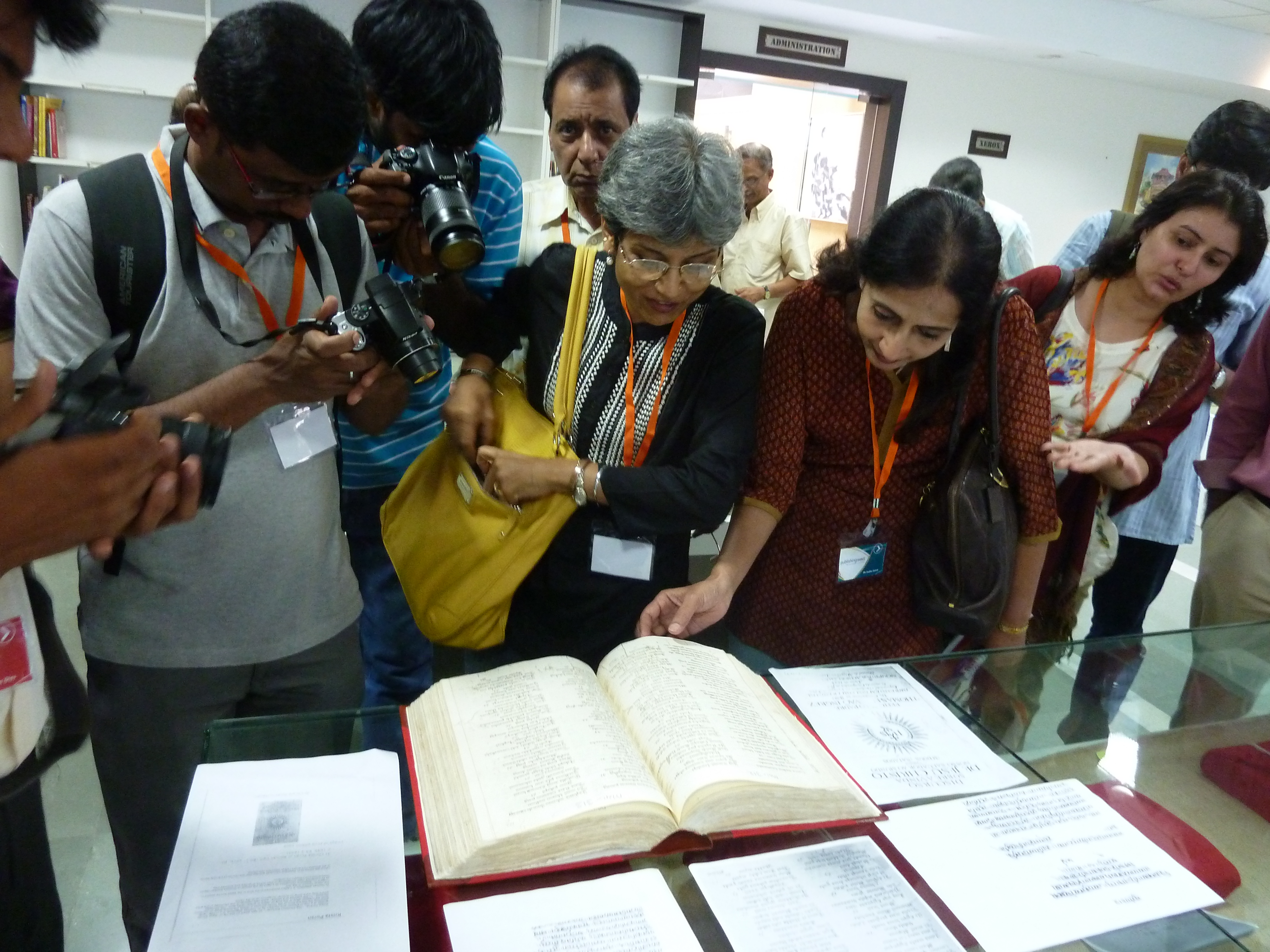
Visitors take a closer look at some of the earliest European-printed books in India.

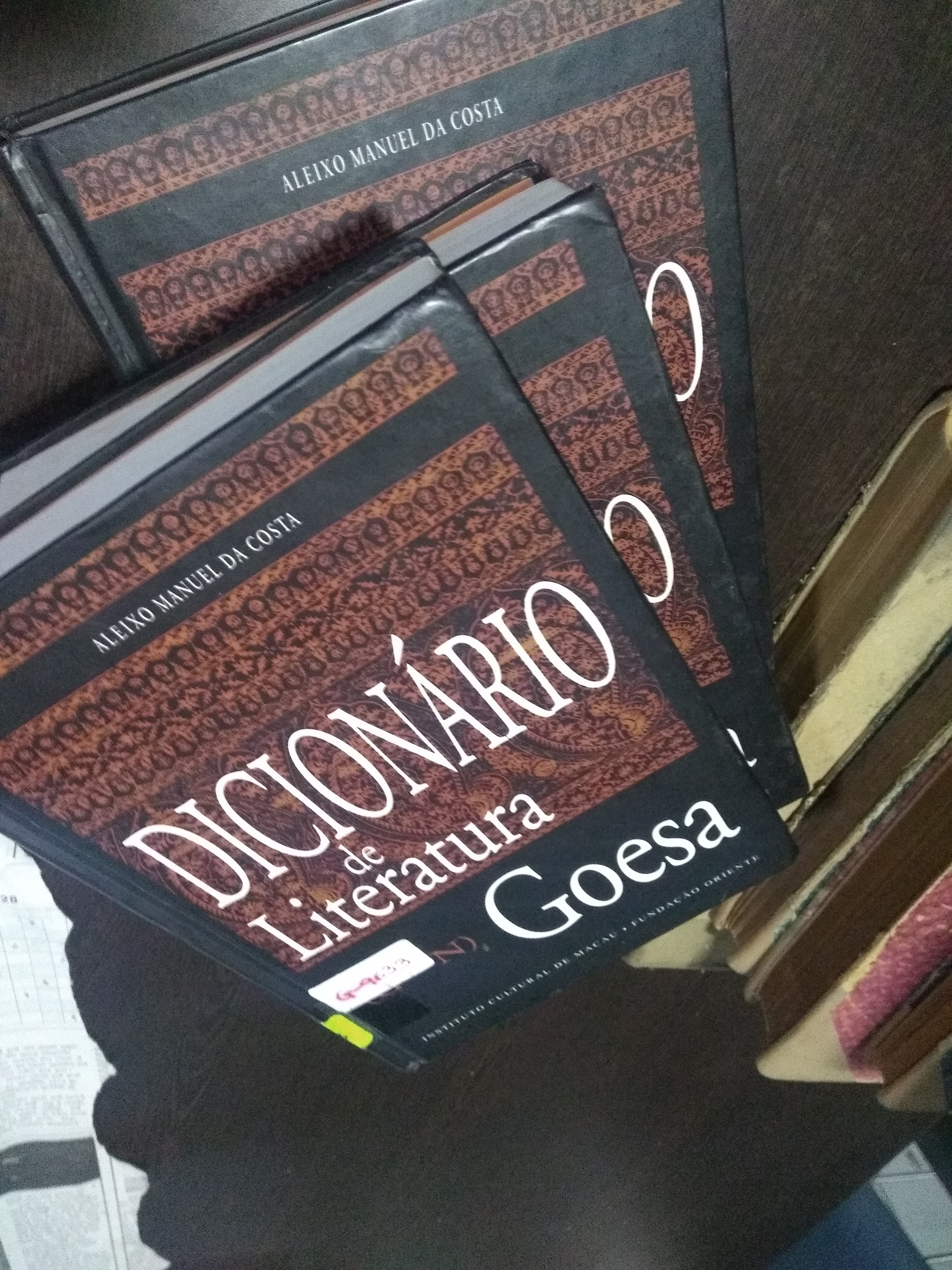
Dictionary of Goan Literature (Portuguese)

== See also ==
- Printing in Goa
- Goan literature
- Outline of Goa
