= Goa Arts and Literature Festival =

Arts festival in India

Goa Arts and Literature Festival (GALF)
- Genre: Literary festival Arts festival
- Locations: International Centre, Goa (ICG), Dona Paula, Goa, India
- Years active: 2010 – present
- Website: www.goaartlitfest.com

The Goa Arts and Literature Festival (GALF) is an annual literary festival which takes place in the Indian coastal state of Goa, each December. It was founded in 2010.

The International Centre, Goa (ICG) serves as the main venue of the festival, with sessions held in the Zuari, Mandovi and Abolim Halls and throughout the gardens. The inaugural event is usually held at the Maquinez Palace.

The event is organized by ICG in association with the Goa Writers' Group, with support from the Directorate of Art and Culture, Government of Goa. The event also features stalls, mainly put up by local bookstores and a few publishers. All events at the festival are free and not ticketed and are open to all.

== History ==
Over the years, GALF has hosted participants that include writers and artists of Goa, from the North-East and Kashmir, Pakistan, Nepal and Bangladesh, and has included themes like Dalit writing, poetry, graphic novels, and translations.

Among its participants were U. R. Ananthamurthy (2010); Teju Cole, Pakistani novelist Bilal Tanweer, Gulzar and Amitav Ghosh (2011); Mridula Garg and Eunice de Souza (2012); Meera Kosambi, Mitra Phukan and Arvind Krishna Mehrotra (2013); Edwin Thumboo and Wendell Rodricks (2014). Samanth Subramaniam, French graphic novelist Nicolas Wild, the Bhand Pather theatre troupe directed by M K Raina, Uttar Kamalabari Satra led by Sri Sri Janardhan Deva Goswami, Naresh Fernandes, the graphic novelist Amruta Patil, Aditya Adhikari, Mamang Dai, Isabel de Santa Rita Vas, Jerry Pinto, Shanta Gokhale (2018), Indian-American rappers Chee Malabar and Himanshu Suri, Pakistani satirical musician Ali Aftab Saeed, American artist Daisy Rockwell, writers and artists from Australia, Nepal and Singapore, and some locals, including school and college students.

=== 2013 ===
GALF also claims to have "consistently hosted some of the best lineups of contemporary poets ever assembled in contemporary India". In 2013, there was an "unprecedented reunion of the great 'Bombay School' of poets who emerged in the 1970's, including Eunice de Souza, Gieve Patel, Arvind Krishna Mehrotra and Manohar Shetty."

=== 2014 ===
GALF 2014 saw senior journalists discuss "the changing nature of the national media". These included Rajdeep Sardesai, Sagarika Ghose, Sreenivasan Jain, Naresh Fernandes, Samar Halarnkar, Priya Ramani, Govindraj Ethiraj, Sachin Kalbag, Prashant Jha, Cyril Almeida. Then Indian Defense Minister Manohar Parrikar released Sardesai's 2014: The Election that Changed India.

=== 2016 ===
GALF 2016 included some new partnerships with Ministry of Culture, Government of India and North Eastern Council, Ministry of Development of North Eastern Region, Shillong Meghalaya. It featured speakers from around the world, like Landeg White (from Wales) and Angelica Freitas (from Brazil), and a host of Indians including Gerson da Cunha, Nabina Das, Ranjit Hoskote, K. Satchidanandan, Mamang Dai and Mustansir Dalvi. It featured a book reading by Goan Manohar Shetty and had political activist from Tamil Nadu, P Sivakami, as a keynote speaker.

Some of the books launched at the festival were Salt of the Earth (by Jayanti Naik and translated by Augusto Pinto), YugSanvar / Age of Frenzy (by Mahableshwar Sail and translated by Vidya Pai), Courage & Commitment (the memoirs of Margaret Alva), as well as other books in both Konkani and English including by Vincy Quadros, Kiran Budkuley, Odette Mascarenhas, Hema Myer Sood, Bina Nayak, Aloysius D’souza, Ivan Arthur, Fernando Jorge Colaco and a showcase of a new book on Persian cuisines by award-winning food writer Naomi Duguid.

The festival had a display of art by Delhi-based photographer and blogger Mayank Soofi and paintings by various Goa-based artists, led by Rajesh Salgaonkar.

The event had a special focus on the art and literature from the North East states of India. It included special readings and discussions by literrateurs from the North-East. The inaugural evening featured a performance by Manipur-based folk rock band, Imphal Talkies. The legendary rock musician from Meghalaya, Lou Majaw, honoured the reluctant Nobel Prize winner for Literature, Bob Dylan with a special concert dedicated to him.

=== 2017 ===
The 2017 festival, the 8th edition, was held on 7–10 December 2017. GALF 2017 included Sahitya Akademi Award winners like Ganesh Devy, Ramachandra Guha, Jerry Pinto and Ranjit Hoskote, along with the 2015 Man Booker Prize nominee Anuradha Roy.

=== 2018 ===
The ninth edition of the festival was held from 6 to 8 December 2018. The keynote addresses at the inaugural were given by Sahitya Akademi award-winning writers Shashi Deshpande and Jerry Pinto. The ninth edition was co-curated by Damodar Mauzo and Vivek Menezes. It featured book releases like Sita Valles: Revolutionary Until Death by Frederick Noronha's Goa 1556.

== Response ==
The online StageCulture.com said of GALF: "Hosted annually in December, this Fest has proven beyond doubt, that Goa is much more than just a hip beach destination and rave hotspot."

Skyscanner.co.in said: "The Goa Arts and Literary festival ... is now in its fifth year, and is quickly establishing itself as one of the literary events of the year. In between attending literary events, readings and book launches, you’ll be able to visit the popular beaches of [G]oa for some sun, sand and seafood! ...Participation is free, with pre-registration."

Writing in The Navhind Times, one critical point of view commented: "Goa needs to create rooms of its own to spur on the creative process. But, now, just when writers from here have an enhanced chance of getting heard, we could be building new hierarchies. Local work needs to be validated by the tastes of someone in New Delhi or New York, before it can be deemed as significant and having value for Goa. This is a deeply disturbing idea, even if it is implemented subconsciously. There seems to be little consultation happening to source out potential participants. In the case of national and international participants, one can go by what is said about them, or reputations built in other literary festivals. How does one choose participation from Goa when we are still to understand the field of who’s doing what?"

Mridula Garg writes, "Sometimes, in a blink of an eye, we discover that the someone we thought lay at the extreme end of the margin is actually closest to us; in fact is our alter ego... That is the point when we begin to create literature or art. That’s why a Damodar Mauzo can write about a Goan boy’s life in East Africa in the last century with the same ease he can write about Goa now. It’s important to remember that the margin is not a homogeneous space. Within the margin lie a number of invisible margins peopled with dissenters. And each of them is a significant other because dissent is the life-blood of literature and social change."

== See also ==
- Jaipur Literature Festival
- International Film Festival of India
