= Literature of North East India =

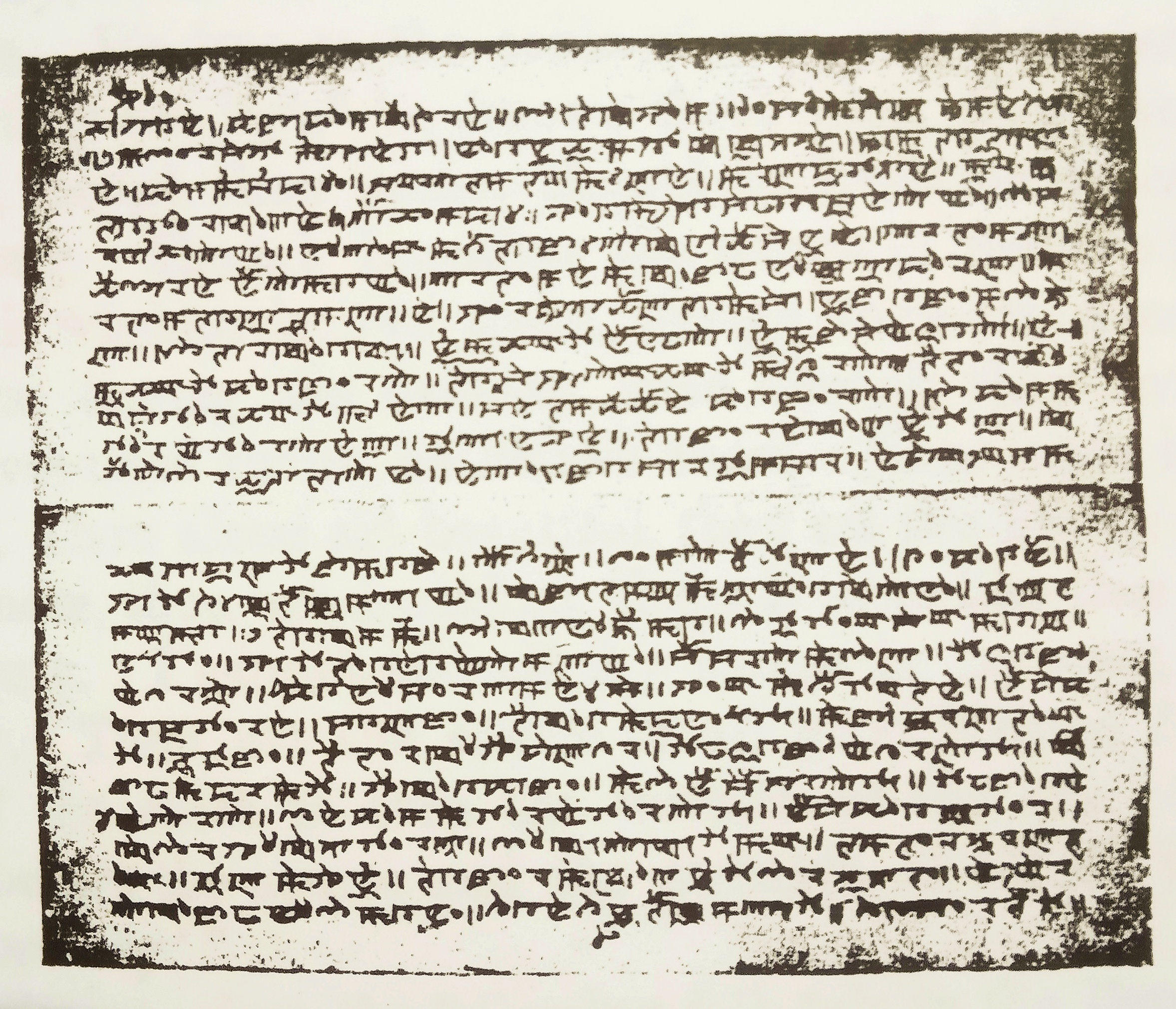
The Numit Kappa, a Classical Meitei epic text written during the 1st century, based on ancient Meitei mythology and religion (Sanamahism).

Literature from North East India is literature in the languages of North East India and the body of work by English-language writers from the region. Though the misnomer for the region was a colonial construct, it continues to be used by the Indian state to denote the region now comprising eight states.

== Debates surrounding the term North East ==
North East India is an under-represented region in many ways. The troubled political climate, the beautiful landscape and the confluence of various ethnic groups perhaps have given rise to a body of writing that is completely different from Indian English literature. North-East India was a colonial construct and continues to be one by virtue of having a historically difficult relationship with the Indian nation state.

There is no single definition of the phrase "literature from North East India", as the diversity of this region defies easy definition. Broadly, this phrase refers mostly to English writing but may also include Assamese literature and writings in the Meitei language, that have long traditions of writing and stand on their own with a glorious legacy.

Many writers such as Harekrishna Deka and Temsula Ao have expressed discomfort with the term North-East India and North Eastern writers, respectively. A section also strongly argue that the term is colonial and, hence, an artificial construct. There is nothing called a "north-easterner" and the concept is purely geographical; it tends to homogenise an extremely heterogeneous cluster of people, as there exists no common history and heritage of the people in North-East India; however, the current states of Arunachal Pradesh, Mizoram and Meghalaya used to be constituent states of former British Assam.

== Recent interest ==
Since 2008, national magazines and journals have taken unprecedented amount of interest in writings from this region. Several national news magazines have featured special issues on writers from the North East. The profusion of literature from North East has also generated immense interest within and outside the nation.

Mitra Phukan, Bhabananda Deka, Dhruba Hazarika, Temsula Ao, Mamang Dai, Arnab Jan Deka, Jahnavi Barua, Anjum Hasan, Siddhartha Deb, Robin S Ngangom, Kynpham Sing Nongkymrih, Desmond L Kharmawphlang, Nabina Das, Uddipana Goswami, Nitoo Das, Manash Pratim Borah, Prodyut Kumar Deka, Ananya S Guha and Rashmi Narzary are some English-language writers from the North East. Malsawmi Jacob was the first Mizo to publish a novel in English. Assamese writers and Indian top literary award Jnanpith winners Dr Birendra Kumar Bhattacharya, who was also President of India's top literary body Sahitya Academy, and Dr Indira Goswami, alias Mamoni Raisom Goswami, were the most famous literary figures to emerge from this region. 'NELive' selected Dr Mamoni Raisom Goswami together with Homen Borgohain, Nirupama Borgohain, Mitra Phukan and Arnab Jan Deka as the '5 Contemporary Writers from Assam who made it big outside the state' and also illustrated their individual literary credentials.

== Literary awards ==
=== Assamese literature ===
- Sahitya Akademi Award winners for Assamese
- Sahitya Akademi Translation Prize winners for Assamese

=== Bodo literature ===
- Sahitya Akademi Award winners for Bodo
- Sahitya Akademi Translation Prize winners for Bodo

=== Meitei literature ===
- Meitei literature
  - Sahitya Akademi awards
    - Sahitya Akademi Award winners for Meitei
    - Sahitya Akademi Translation Prize winners for Meitei
    - Yuva Puraskar for Meitei
  - Patriotic Writers' Forum awards
    - Pacha Meetei Literary Award
    - R Kathing Tangkhul Literary Award
    - Dr Saroj Nalini Parratt Literary Award

== Critical responses ==
The younger generation of English-language writers from North-East India include Jahnavi Barua, Arnab Jan Deka, Siddhartha Sarma, Nitoo Das, Janice Pariat, Nabanita Kanungo, Mona Zote, Ankush Saikia, Bijoya Sawian and Uddipana Goswami. These writers express strong political awareness by addressing issues such as identity and ethnicity; a few hailing from Assam interrogate the violence that has ravaged their home state Assam due to the tussle between the secessionist militant group ULFA and the Indian government in complex ways. Some of them like Arnab Jan Deka delved deep into the spiritual and intellectual heritage along the Brahmaputra valley, and also highlighted its environmental fragility.

Discussing the work of the new generation of writers from North East, Preeti Gill says, "Many younger writers continue to grapple with these issues. Having grown up in the shadow of the gun, their desire to analyse the common people’s reaction to insurgency is as strong as ever."

Literary journal Pratilipi adumbrates the issues that concern writers from North East India in its special feature, "It is tragic that the long-running unrest, violence and terrorism in the North-East has remained a mere digression in the mainstream of the Indian nation-state – ironically, even in the mainstream arts that otherwise come across as very charged and political. The poems by Uddipana Goswami and six poets translated by Tarun Bhartiya, along with stories by Mitra Phukan and Srutimala Duara serve as a reminder that the "North-East" is not a geographical, political unit, but a place of many languages and cultures."

The internationally acclaimed iconic journal Art of Living Guide edited by Spain-based novelist, screenwriter and philanthropist Claire Elizabeth Terry, which carries regular columns by several Nobel laureates like Mikhail Gorbachev, Dalai Lama and Camilo Jose Sela, published a special essay of popular British poet and environmentalist Tess Joyce on the aesthetics of philosophical realms and lifestyle on the Banks of Brahmaputra in Assam by highlighting Arnab Jan Deka's book of poetry A Stanza of Sunlight on the Banks of Brahmaputra, which says, "Written during his high school years, Arnab’s poems plunged the reader into further depths – into the midst of the universe itself and the riverine landscapes only served to increase the levels of complexity the narrator saw; we are left to realise that no-one is big enough to hold the universe and so: "Yet with no empty space left on the boat/the Universe sat quietly beside the reeds." Imbibed with a sense of awe, the narrator’s desires for explanations disappeared – it was the poetry that satisfied him, hence: "On the bald head of the dusty earth/Ashwaklanta bestowed a stanza of sunlight." A more extensive version of this literary masterpiece on literature from North East India also found a place of pride in the London-based research journal Luit to Thames. In the prestigious Delhi-based journal The Book Review, critic and poet N Kalyani admires Arnab Jan Deka's poetry from the same book, "And in These Small Thoughts Deka reveals what Umananda is, 'A tiny river island amidst the mighty river Brahmaputra near the prehistoric city of Pragjyotishpur, known by its modern name Guwahati now,' in a way that brings the image so alive: The tiny rivulet reflect a myriad of colour/The distant Umananda--a majestic aloof lily pad/The blackish riverbank with flowing wind/The cities dreaming of fleeced nomad/Besides the tidal marina."

== List of writers from North-East India ==
- Ananda Chandra Agarwala
- Ananda Chandra Barua
- Ananda Ram Baruah
- Ankush Saikia
- Anuradha Sharma Pujari
- Arupa Kalita Patangia
- Arup Kumar Dutta
- Amulya Barua
- Atul Chandra Hazarika
- Banikanta Kakati
- Bhabananda Deka
- Bhabendra Nath Saikia
- Bijoya Sawian
- Birendra Kumar Bhattacharya
- Birinchi Kumar Barua
- Brajanath Sarma
- Chandra Kumar Agarwala
- Daisy Hasan
- Dhrubajyoti Bora
- Dhruba Hazarika
- Easterine Kire
- Dimbeswar Neog
- Dr Manish Das
- Harekrishna Deka
- Hem Chandra Barua
- Hem Chandra Goswami
- Hem Barua
- Hem Barua (Tyagbir)
- Hiren Gohain
- Homen Borgohain
- Irom Chanu Sharmila
- Jahnavi Barua
- Janice Pariat
- Jogesh Das
- Jyoti Prasad Agarwala
- Kaliram Medhi
- Kamalakanta Bhattacharya
- Krishna Kanta Handique
- Kochery C Shibu
- Laksminath Bezbarua
- Maharaj Kumari Binodini Devi
- Malsawmi Jacob
- Mamang Dai
- Mamoni Raisom Goswami
- Mithinga Daimary
- Mitra Phukan
- Nalini Bala Devi
- Nalini Prava Deka
- Navakanta Barua
- Nirmal Prabha Bordoloi
- Padmanath Gohain Baruah
- Parag Kumar Das
- Phani Sarma
- Prodyut Kumar Deka
- Raghunath Choudhari
- Rashmi Narzary
- Rita Chowdhury
- Rongbong Terang
- Rumi Laskar Bora
- Saurabh Kumar Chaliha
- Siddhartha Sarma
- Srutimala Duara
- Surya Kumar Bhuyan
- Tanupriya Kalita

== See also ==
- Assamese literature
- Meitei literature
- Indian English literature
- Indian literature
- Insurgency in Northeast India
- Mizo literature
