= List of Bal Sahitya Puraskar winners for English =

Winners of a literary honour in India

Part of a series on

Sahitya Akademi Awards
Category
Sahitya Akademi Award winners by language
- Assamese
- Bengali
- Bodo
- Dogri
- English
- Gujarati
- Hindi
- Kannada
- Kashmiri
- Konkani
- Maithili
- Malayalam
- Marathi
- Meitei (Manipuri)
- Nepali
- Odia
- Punjabi
- Rajasthani
- Sanskrit
- Santali
- Sindhi
- Tamil
- Telugu
- Urdu
Sahitya Akademi Translation Prizes
- Assamese
- Bengali
- Bodo
- Dogri
- English
- Gujarati
- Hindi
- Kannada
- Kashmiri
- Konkani
- Maithili
- Malayalam
- Marathi
- Meitei (Manipuri)
- Nepali
- Odia
- Punjabi
- Rajasthani
- Sanskrit
- Santali
- Sindhi
- Tamil
- Telugu
- Urdu
Sahitya Akademi Yuva Puraskar
- Assamese
- Bengali
- Bodo
- Dogri
- English
- Gujarati
- Hindi
- Kannada
- Kashmiri
- Konkani
- Maithili
- Malayalam
- Meitei (Manipuri)
- Marathi
- Nepali
- Odia
- Punjabi
- Rajasthani
- Sanskrit
- Santali
- Sindhi
- Tamil
- Telugu
- Urdu
Sahitya Akademi Bal Sahitya Puraskar
- Assamese
- Bengali
- Bodo
- Dogri
- English
- Gujarati
- Hindi
- Kannada
- Kashmiri
- Konkani
- Maithili
- Malayalam
- Meitei (Manipuri)
- Marathi
- Nepali
- Odia
- Punjabi
- Rajasthani
- Sanskrit
- Santali
- Sindhi
- Tamil
- Telugu
- Urdu
Related
- Eighth Schedule to the Constitution of India
- Official Languages Commission
- List of languages by number of native speakers in India

Bal Sahitya Puraskar is given each year to writers for their outstanding works in the 24 languages, since 2010.

== Recipients ==
Following is the list of recipients of Bal Sahitya Puraskar for their works written in English. The award comprises a cash prize of Rs. 50,000 and an engraved copper plaque.

Year	Author	Work	Genre	References
2010	Mini Srinivasan	Just A Train Ride Away	Novel	
2011	Siddhartha Sarma	The Grasshopper’s Run	Novel	
2012	Ruskin Bond	Total Contribution to Children's Literature		
2013	Anita Nair	Total Contribution to Children's Literature		
2014	Subhadra Sen Gupta	Total Contribution to Children's Literature		
2015	Sowmya Rajendran, Niveditha Subramaniam	Mayil Will Not Be Quiet!	Novel	
2016	Rashmi Narzary	His Share of Sky	Stories	
2017	Paro Anand	Wild Child and other Sorties	Short Stories	
2018	Easterine Kire	Son of the Thundercloud	Fables	
2019	Devika Cariapa	India Through Archaeology: Excavating History	History	
2020	Venita Coelho	Dead As A Dodo	Fiction	
2021	Anita Vachharajani	Amrita Sher-gil: Rebel with a paintbrush	Biography	
2022	Arshia Sattar	Mahabharata for Children Fiction	Arshia Sattar	
2023	Sudha Murty	Grandparent's Bag of Stories	Stories	
2024	Nandini Sengupta	The Blue Horse and Other Amazing Animals from Indian History	Historical Fiction	
2025	Nitin Kushalappa	Dakshin: South Indian Myths and Fables Retold	Stories	

== See also ==
- List of Sahitya Akademi Award winners for English
