= Temsüla Ao =

Indian writer (1945–2022)

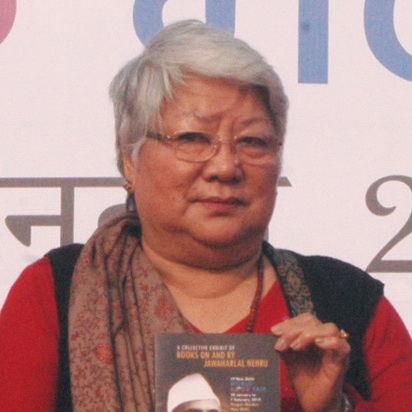
- Temsüla Ao during New Delhi World Book Fair in 2010
- Born: 25 October 1945; Jorhat, Bengal Presidency, British India (Present-day Jorhat, Assam, India)
- Died: 9 October 2022 (aged 76); Dimapur, Nagaland, India
- Education: Fazl Ali College (BA); Gauhati University (MA); English and Foreign Languages University (PgD); NEHU (PhD)
- Occupations: Poet; ethnographer
- Children: Anungla Zoe Longkumer T. John Longkumer
- Writing career
- Notable works: These Hills Called Home; Laburnum For My Head
- Notable awards: Padma Shri (2007); Sahitya Akademi Award (2013)

Temsüla Ao (25 October 1945 – 9 October 2022) was an Indian poet, fiction writer, and ethnographer. She was a professor of English at North Eastern Hill University (NEHU) from where she retired in 2010. She served as the director of the North East Zone Cultural Centre between 1992 and 1997 on deputation from NEHU. She was awarded the Padma Shri award for her contribution to literature and education. Her book Laburnum For My Head received the Sahitya Akademi Award for English writing in the short story category. Her works have been translated into Assamese, Bengali, French, German, Hindi, and Kannada.

== Early life and education ==
On 25 October 1945, Temsüla was born to Imnamütongba Changkiri and Nokintemla Longkumer in Jorhat. She had five siblings. When her youngest brother was only beginning to crawl, her parents died within nine months of each other. Thereafter, her youngest two siblings were taken to their ancestral village Changki village in Mokokchung district to live with their father's younger brother. The four eldest siblings–Khari, Tajen, Temsüla, and Along–stayed at Jorhat under the guardianship of Khari who was temporarily employed in Jorhat Mission Hospital. Soon, the youngest among the four, Along, was also taken to Changki. When Tajen got appointed as an assistant teacher in the village primary school, she took on the responsibilities of the younger siblings at Changki. Ao summarises her difficult childhood and adolescence in her memoir Once upon a Life as 'fractured childhood.' Her ancestral family were involved in the early settlement of Changki village and her visits and affinity to the village helped her "reaffirm the sensibilities that have given me my intrinsic identity."

She studied in Golaghat Girls' Mission for six years as a boarder. She studied in Assamese-medium there until class 6. For her matriculation exam later, she even wrote two papers in the Assamese language. She spoke the language fluently. She completed her matriculation from Ridgeway Girls' High School in Golaghat. She received her B.A. with distinction from Fazl Ali College, Mokokchung, Nagaland, and M.A. in English from Gauhati University, Assam. From English and Foreign Languages University, Hyderabad, she received her Post Graduate Diploma in the Teaching of English and PhD from NEHU.

== Teaching ==
Ao began teaching English in NEHU as a lecturer from December 1975. She completed her PhD in May 1983 under the guidance of Dr. D. P. Singh. Titled The Heroines of Henry James, her thesis examined female protagonists in James' stories who emerge victorious in their sophisticated and civilised society. For this, Ao analysed the following works of Henry James: The Madonna of the Future, Daisy Miller, Madame de Mauves, Washington Square, The Portrait of a Lady, The Wings of the Dove, and The Golden Bowl.

From 1992 to 1997 she served as Director, North East Zone Cultural Centre, Dimapur on Deputation from NEHU, and was a Fulbright Fellow at the University of Minnesota 1985–86. In 2010, Ao retired as a professor and dean of the English Department at NEHU.

Ao received the Padma Shri Award in 2007. She is the recipient of the Governor's Gold Medal 2009 from the government of Meghalaya. She was widely respected as one of the major literary voices in English to emerge from Northeast India along with Mitra Phukan and Mamang Dai. Her works have been translated into German, French, Assamese, Bengali and Hindi.

== Writings ==
Ao conceded to Paulo Coelho's reflection in The Zahir that writing can be a lonely endeavour. However, "there are also times when words are flowing and seem to offer themselves happily to articulate one's thought." The resulting mood of exhilaration and joy, Ao suggests, lends a strange feeling of not being alone. It provides a sense of completeness similar to a fellowship felt in the company of equally happy people. Ao stated that she wrote for such rare moments of "completeness." This inner urge compels her to write along with her need "to probe, to question, and also to acknowledge that I exist in the one-ness with my fellow human beings." Reflecting on writings from Northeast India, Ao explained,

It is about the life we know, and want to share with our fellow citizens who have somehow always looked at us through the prism of 'otherness' and suspicion. Accepting the difference can also mean transcending the 'local' to discover the 'universal.' In that sense, these writings deserve more than the cursory perusals as 'categories' that they are subjected to at the moment.

She resisted clubbing of the Northeast as a composite identity. She called the North-eastern identity as a misnomer "because the region is home to a multitude of people with diverse languages, cultures, costumes." Using the term, "defaces the real identity" of the communities and people living in the region. Therefore, the term has relevance only as a geographical and geo-political indicator. In the same interview, she noted that Nagaland's Hornbill Festival is only the commercial face of Naga identity and not Naga identity itself. Journalist Patricia Mukhim reaffirmed Ao's conviction, "[She] was quietly confident about her purpose in life which is to rectify the lenses through which her people, the Nagas, were viewed by the rest of the world."

=== Poetry ===
She has published seven poetic works.

- Songs that Tell (1988),
- Songs that Try to Say (1992),
- Songs of Many Moods (1995),
- Songs from Here and There (2003),
- Songs From The Other Life (2007).
- Book of Songs: Collected Poems 1988-2007 (2013).
- Songs along the Way Home (2019).

Her first two poetry collections were published from Writers Workshop, Kolkata. The third, fourth, and fifth poetry collections were published by Kohima Sahitya Sabha, North Eastern Hill University and Grasswork Books respectively. The last two were published by Heritage Publishing House, Dimapur.

Journalist Aheli Moitra describes the 50-poem collection Songs along the Way Home as "a deep philosophical exploration of life–personal, social, political–as it has passed her [Ao] by. The poems are heavy, laden with layers of lament, written with the skill of a songbird singing its favourite dusk song." Moitra points that Ao is candid in her poems, registering life and wisdom, and never shy of showing emotions necessary.

=== Ethnography ===
When she was in the University of Minnesota as a Fulbright fellow, she came in contact with the Native Americans. She learned about their culture, heritage and especially their oral tradition. This exposure inspired her to record the oral tradition of her own community, Ao Naga. After returning from the University of Minnesota, she worked on the oral tradition for about twelve years. She collected the myths, folktales, folklore, rituals, law, custom, belief system. This ethnographic work was published in 1999 as the Ao-Naga oral tradition from Bhasha Publications, Baroda. This book is the most authentic document about the Ao-Naga community.

=== Short story ===
Temsüla Ao has published three short story collections. These Hills Called Home: Stories from the War Zone, Zubaan (2005), Laburnum for my Head, Penguin India (2009) and The Tombstone in my Garden: Stories from Nagaland, Speaking Tiger Books (2022).

These Hills Called Home consists of ten short stories and deals with insurgency in Nagaland fired by right to self-determination of the Naga people.

Speaking Tiger published her last book of short stories The Tombstone in my Garden: Stories from Nagaland in early 2022. The book blurb on the back cover describes the collection of five stories as holding 'a mirror to the lives of everyday people beyond the headlines.'

On 9 April 2022, Nagaland Director General of Police, T John Longkumer, released the book in Dimapur.

Pradip Phanjoubam found the book peculiarly 'dark' compared to her debut collection These Hills Called Home. He summarises the book as 'a subconscious sketch of the Naga nostalgia for a traditional world being left behind.' Author Rupa Gulab summarises the central thread of the five stories as, "we are brutally reminded of a universal truth: Love hurts, and death is a release." Advising against presuming that the small book is cosy bedtime book, she points that the stories are 'disconcerting' with endings of each often open pushing the readers to keep guessing.

=== Literary criticism ===
She published a book of literary criticism Henry James' Quest for an Ideal Heroine. It was published in 1989 from Writers Workshop.

=== Online works ===
- Essay: When in doubt

=== Books ===
- Laburnum for My Head (Penguin, 2009)
- These Hills Called Home: Stories From A War Zone (Penguin, 2005 / Zubaan, 2013)
- Ao-Naga Oral Tradition (2000)

=== Memoir ===
- Once Upon a Life: Burnt Curry And Bloody Rags (2014)

== Nagaland State Commission for Women ==
In January 2013, she was appointed as the Chairperson of the Nagaland State Commission for Women. As the chairperson, Ao was very vocal for women's rights in the state often challenging traditional status quo and legal stalemate.

=== Naga Customary Law ===
Ao advocated for redefining Naga Customary Law to remove its inherent gender bias. She made it clear that this did not mean abolishing of Customary Laws and they remain the bedrock of Naga society. Instead, it needed to be redone and changed to give new meaning in the present milieu. The redefinition must begin from within the patriarchal settings of customary law institutions as they remain 'the custodians of the laws'. She also envisioned a special focus to make way for women into village councils, town committees, and Nagaland Legislative Assembly along with women's inheritance to parental property. It was clear to her that civil society interventions or government efforts to promote gender equality would not change much despite gender budgeting and gender-safe workplaces,

Whatever be the results of such efforts, they will be superficial at best because the core of gender discrimination lies at the very heart of customary laws which direct and govern Naga life even in the twenty-first century.

In 2013, at one of her first public meetings holding the position, she called women and girls to play their part with conviction in the bid to make statutory laws for gender justice work. She was addressing a legal awareness campaign at Kohima College. She called the campaign to acquaint young students to not only give security to their 'physical selves but to ensure their intellectual growth.' While appreciating that certain social evils prevalent elsewhere in the country does not exist in Nagaland, she articulated that prevalent gender injustice in the Naga society is due to men persisting in their rigid stance that "governance, like the village council and decision making in the family for instance, is the prerogative of men." She also chided women for accepting their traditional role despite education. Ao made clear her support for customary law and practices and hailed them for providing "continuity and strength" to the Naga society. However, her critique lied in the inherent gender bias in customary law practices in cases of marriage, divorce and inheritance. She called for open deliberations on these issues for "incorporating changes and fair adjustments in a modern set-up which will be beneficial to women, and where men and women can work together as equals in all respect." She spent a significant part of her tenure relaying this message to different tribes of Nagaland in their respective districts. In August 2013, at a seminar on gender sensitisation among police personnel, judiciary, and civil society members, Ao boldly stated, "Only when the basic human rights of the Naga women get due acknowledgement from the family, clan, village, and the overall societal framework, can we say that the process of gender sensitisation has truly started in Nagaland." She recalled that several accounts of gender injustice exist in the Naga society due to the "cultural and traditional norms prevalent... [often impinging] on women's rights, for being of a different gender." She called for articulation and protection of women's identity at "the very existential level." She called for instituting shelter homes in every district in Nagaland for survivors of gender violence to deal with trauma, provide counselling, and teach livelihood skills. In September 2013, drawing from her experiences, she noted that cases of marital discord in Nagaland mostly go unheard and unattended as the woman is often too traumatised.

At the start of her tenure as the chairperson, she had initiated dialogues between the apex bodies of all tribes of Nagaland in this regard. Five years later, in 2018, she lamented that work around giving women a share in their parental property still remained half-done.

=== Human Trafficking ===
On 28 May 2017, at a programme on Human Trafficking in Phek district of Nagaland, she emphasised the vulnerability of Nagas youth to being trafficked. She called the society to be vigilant. She called people to report cases of abuse and ill-treatment of minors living as maids and domestic helps in Nagaland. She believed that the evil had to be investigated and addressed urgently. At another meeting early in the month, she referred to police data that showed that a person went missing every fourth day in Nagaland. Of these, 83% of missing people were minors. She pointed out that customary law are not well-equipped to deal with practices of human trafficking and police needed to intervene and play a role. She also insisted on proper links between police, child rights agencies, labour department, social welfare departments, mental health agencies, and NGOs to curb human trafficking.

=== Women's reservation ===
She was a strong supporter of women's reservation in Nagaland. Speaking at an event, she promised to continue to work for equal rights for women and hoped women enter decision-making process in Naga politics. She invited Nagas to retrospect the areas where "we have failed."

== Awards ==
- Padma Shri, 2007
- Governor's Gold Medal, 2009
- Sahitya Akademi Award, 2013
- Kusumagraj National Literature Award, 2015

== Legacy ==
Zahan writes that Ao was more than a writer and scholar for the Nagas. She summarises Ao's work as,

She was the guardian, the voice, and the mirror of the Naga society who brought the everyday lives of the Nagas blurred between insurgency and counter-insurgency in front of the world through her poetry, short stories, and memoirs.

Recalling her body of work and life, Walter Fernandes, founder-director of the North Eastern Social Research Centre based in Guwahati, called her an "institution of a scholar."

== See also ==
- Literature from North East India
