= How the BJP Wins =

2017 book

How the BJP Wins: Inside India's Greatest Election Machine
- Author: Prashant Jha
- Language: English
- Subject: Bharatiya Janata Party, Indian politics
- Publisher: Juggernaut Books
- Publication date: September 20, 2017
- Publication place: India
- Media type: Print (Hardcover)
- Pages: 256
- ISBN: 978-9353450182

How the BJP Wins: Inside India's Greatest Election Machine is a 2017 book by Indian journalist Prashant Jha. Published by Juggernaut Books, it provides an in-depth analysis of the Bharatiya Janata Party's electoral strategies and organizational mechanisms that propelled it to national prominence.

Drawing on extensive field reporting and interviews, Jha explores the BJP's campaign tactics, leadership dynamics, and grassroots mobilization across multiple Indian states.

The narrative examines the transformation of the party's election machinery, highlighting the roles of key figures such as Narendra Modi and Amit Shah and the coordination with affiliated organizations like the Rashtriya Swayamsevak Sangh (RSS). How the BJP Wins* received critical attention for its detailed account of the party's internal workings and electoral strategies. A review in The Book Review India highlighted its comprehensive analysis.

The book is widely referenced in discussions on Indian electoral politics and is considered a valuable resource for scholars and practitioners. The paperback edition has remained in print, with reprints sold through platforms such as Flipkart and IBPBooks.

== See also ==
- Prashant Jha
- Bharatiya Janata Party
- Juggernaut Books
- Narendra Modi
- Amit Shah
