= Duara =

Duarah is a surname belonging to Tai Ahom ethnicity but this surname is also found in Kayastha (Kalita) community. It's also written as Duara, Dowerah, Duwarah, etc but Duarah is most commonly used. In the Ahom language, Duarah surname is called Phu-Pau-Tu (𑜇𑜥, 𑜆𑜧. 𑜄𑜥 ), which translates literally to 'Gatekeeper' or 'Doorkeeper.' The etymology is broken down as: Phūu means person, Pâu means to guard or look after, Tuu means door. People of this surname:

- Prasenjit Duara (born 1950), Indian-American historian of China
- Srutimala Duara, Indian writer
- Udayan Duarah, Assamese actor
