= PubNext =

Publishing Next is an annual publishing conference held in Goa, India.

== Event ==
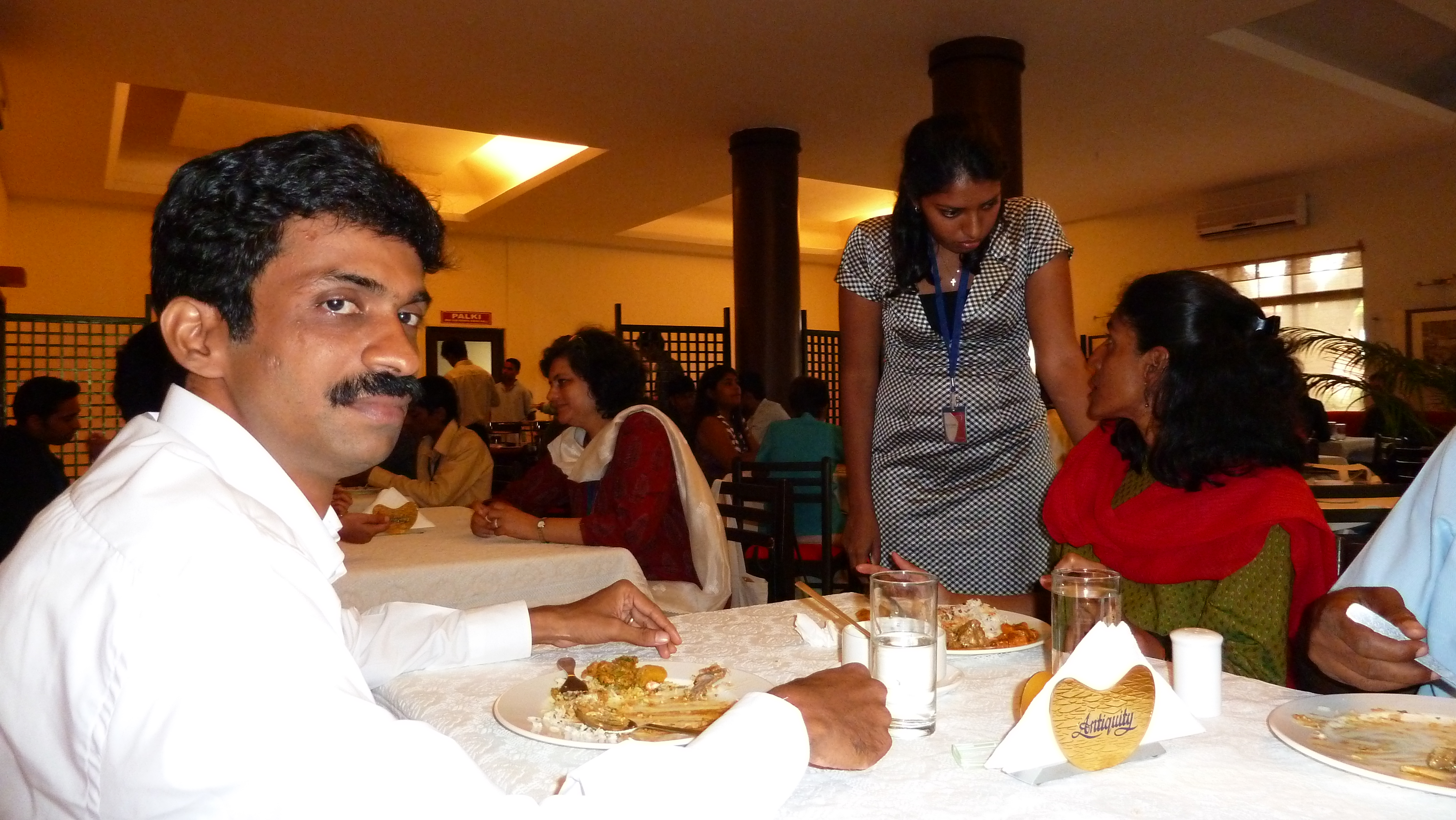
Organisers, including Leonard Fernandes and Queenie Rodrigues. 2011.

The event is held in Goa, India. It has been held at the International Centre, Goa in the first year of 2011 and at the Goa State Central Library in Panjim/Panaji in 2012.

According to the IndianPrinterPublisher.com, "The conference was conceptualized out of a need to understand the changes in technology and business practices that had the potential to impact the publishing sector so that its stakeholders could better prepare themselves for the future."

This event draws "publishers, authors, bloggers, digital content developers, literary critics and others associated with the publishing ecosystem from around the country and internationally."

== History ==
The event is organised by Leonard Fernandes and Queenie Rodrigues Fernandes of CinnamonTeal Publishing, a division of Dogears Print Media Pvt. Ltd.

== Content ==
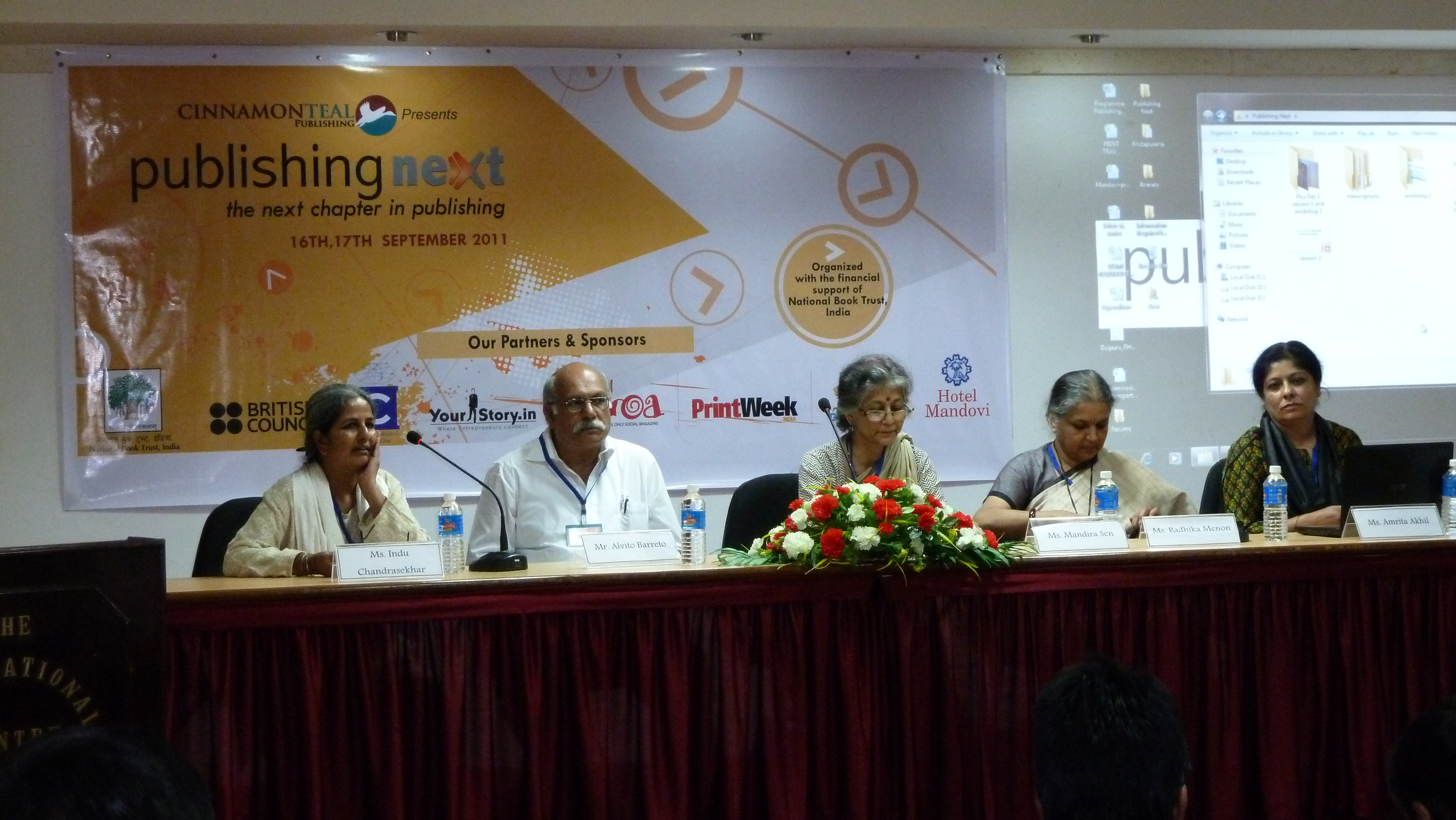
One of the conference panels. 2011.

The event takes the shape of panel discussions and talks. Among the issues focussed on are impact of social media marketing, business process outsourcing, ebooks. According to YourStory.In, "Publishing Next is also designed to be a networking platform to facilitate the trade of publishing rights, encourage dialogue between publishers and vendors and organize workshops on the technical aspects of social media marketing and digitization of content."

== Advisory board ==
On its advisory board are Vinutha Mallya, Independent Publishing Consultant; K. Satyanarayan, Publisher, New Horizon Media; and Rubin D’Cruz, Editor, National Book Trust.
