= Dhruba Hazarika =

Indian novelist

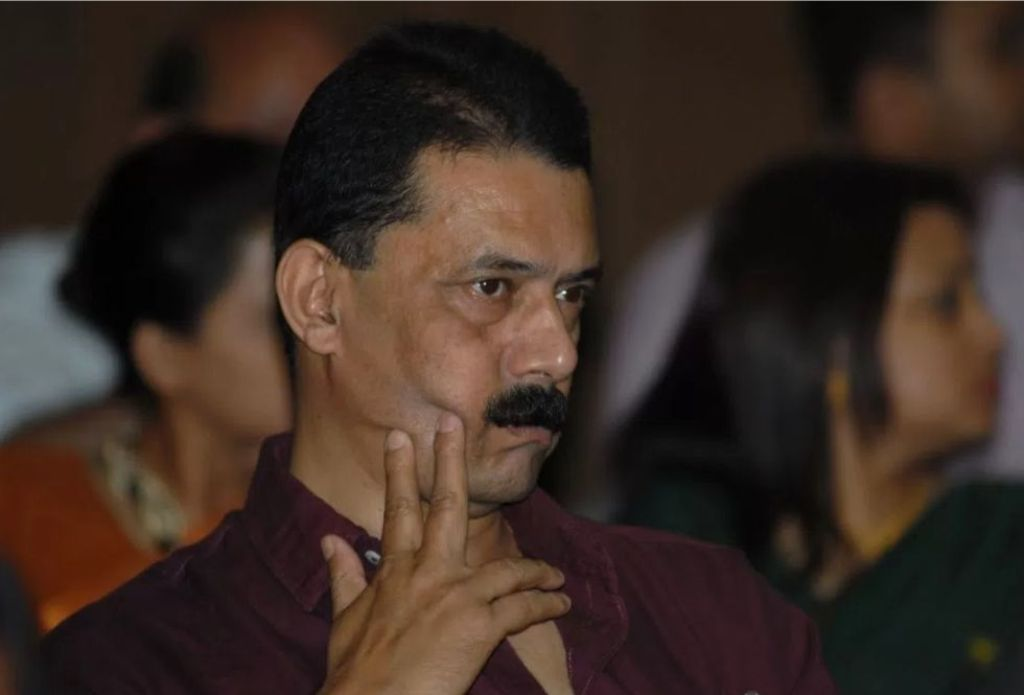
- Born: 1956 (age 69–70); Shillong, India
- Education: St. Edmund's College, Shillong; Gauhati University
- Occupation: Novelist
- Writing career
- Notable awards: Katha Award

Dhruba Hazarika (born 1956) is an Indian novelist who writes in English language. He is the author of 'A Bowstring Winter', 'Sons of Brahma', 'Luck'.

== Early life and employment ==
Hazarika was born in Shillong, Meghalaya. After graduating from St. Edmund's College, Shillong in 1976, he obtained his Masters in Economics from Gauhati University. After briefly working as a salesman in Delhi and as a lecturer at Jagiroad College, Assam, he joined the Assam Civil Service in 1983. He was the Director of Sports and Youth Welfare and Director (Operations), Assam. He is the president of the All Assam Taekwondo Association.

== Literary career ==
He is the founder secretary of the North East Writers’ Forum established in 1997. His short stories have been published in various newspapers including the Sentinel and the Telegraph. A collection of his short stories, Luck, was published in 2010 by Penguin. Hazarika’s first novel, A Bowstring Winter was published by Penguin India in 2006. His second novel, Sons of Brahma, also by Penguin, was published in 2014. Dhruba is a recipient of the Katha Award for fiction in English in 1996 and the DY365 Award for Literature for 2014.

== Bibliography ==
- Luck, Penguin Books, 2009, ISBN 978-0-14-306825-9.
- A Bowstring Winter, Penguin Books, 2006, ISBN 0-14-306180-1.
- Sons of Brahma, Penguin Books, 2006, ISBN

== Awards ==
- 1996: Katha Award for Creative Writing in English.
- 2014: DY365 # Award for Literature

== See also ==
- Indian English Literature
- Literature from North East India
