= Anungla Zoe Longkumer =

Indian writer from Nagaland

- Occupations: Writer; Filmmaker; Musician; Folklorist
- Known for: Filmmaking, Music, Preservation of Naga folk traditions
- Notable work: Folklore of Eastern Nagaland, The Many That I Am: Writings from Nagaland (editor)
- Parent: Temsüla Ao (mother)

Anungla Zoe Longkumer is an Indian writer, filmmaker, and musician from Nagaland, India. She is known for preserving and promoting Naga folk traditions, primarily oral traditions, women's narratives, and the Naga identity through her works. Her anthology, The Many That I Am, is notable for bringing together diverse voices of Naga women writers and artists, providing a platform for their perspectives on history, culture, and societal issues.

She is based in Dimapur, Nagaland. She is also the daughter of Temsüla Ao, a Padma Shri awardee from Nagaland.

== Career ==
Longkumar focuses on documenting and preserving Naga folklore and cultural expressions through writing, filmmaking, and music. Having spent a significant part of her life outside Nagaland, she now freelances in Dimapur, where she works in content editing, music, filmmaking, and folklore research.

Her work explores themes of Naga history, such as the impact of Christianity, traditional storytelling practices, the role of orality in cultural transmission, and the experiences of Naga women. She worked as research associate for Season 2 of Paatak Lok, an Indian Haryanvi-language crime thriller television series on Amazon Prime Video.

In addition to her writing and research, Longkumer has curated art exhibitions, such as "A Way Of Being," which showcased Naga traditional and contemporary art. She has also participated in discussions and events concerning the cultural heritage of Nagaland and women's issues.

== Published works ==
Longkumer is the author of Folklore of Eastern Nagaland (2017). This book comprises translations of folktales, folk songs, and real-life accounts collected from six tribes inhabiting the more remote districts of Eastern Nagaland.

She is also the editor and a contributor to the anthology The Many That I Am: Writings from Nagaland (first published 2019 by Zubaan Books, also listed with a 2021 University of Chicago Press distribution). This collection features stories, poems, first-person narratives, and visuals by Naga women writers and artists. It reflects on their journeys to reclaim their past and understand their complex present, written in English, a language adopted in Nagaland following the arrival of the Church. She also scripted, narrated, and edited a 26-minute documentary film on Naga log-drum that was invited for screening at the Bali International Indigenous Film Festival, in Indonesia in May 2019, and also at the Rainforest Fringe Festival at Kuching, Sarawak, in Malaysia in July 2019.
