= Lok Bhavan, Panaji =

Residence of the Goa Governor

Lok Bhavan
- Palácio do Cabo
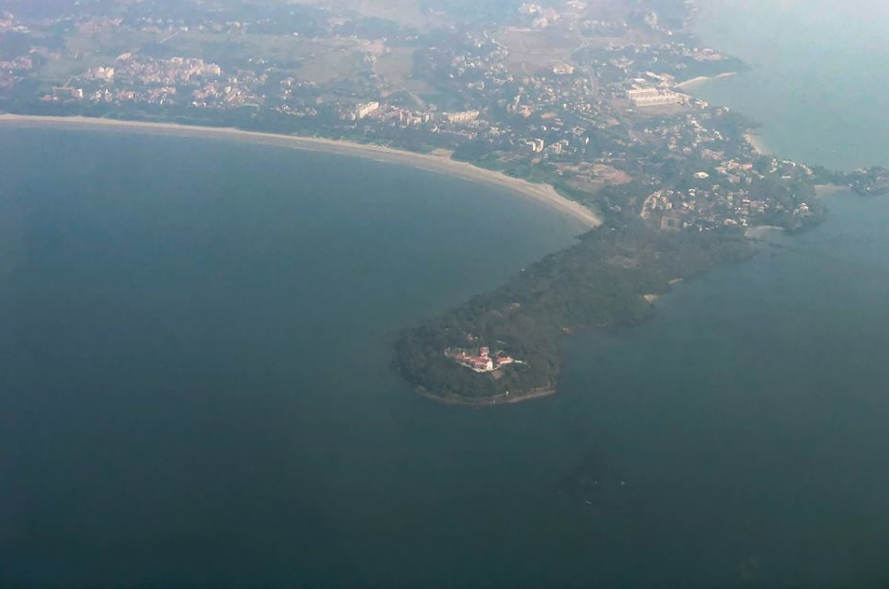
- Aerial view of the Raj Bhavan.
- Interactive map of the Lok Bhavan area

General information
- Location: Dona Paula, Goa, India
- Coordinates: 15.462826°N 73.789159°E
- Current tenants: Ashok Gajapathi Raju
- Construction started: 1534

Technical details
- Floor area: 88 acres

Lok Bhavan, formerly Raj Bhavan (Government House) is a residential palace and fort situated in Dona Paula, Goa, which serves as the official residence of the governor of Goa. The sprawling 88 acres estate is located on a cape in the Goan capital, Panaji. Known by the name "Palácio do Cabo" (Portuguese for "Palace of the Cape") until it gained official status as the residence of the governor of Goa, this palace is said to be built between the 16th and 17th centuries in the erstwhile Portuguese India. The fort is strategically positioned facing the Arabian sea opposite the well-preserved 17th century Forte Aguada.

== History ==
In 1540, the eighth governor of Portuguese India, Estêvão de Gama, proposed the idea of constructing some fortifications to guard the entrance to the Goa harbor. As per their long-established defense strategy they quickly built a church and fort and subsequently attached a convent. The Cabo (Portuguese for "cape") was converted into one of the best equipped and important fortresses over the years, although these days nothing remains of the old citadel that served as the Franciscan Convent. Since the canons were not often used, the buildings at some point of time were also used as temporary accommodation for the archbishop. Over course of time it became the official residence of the Portuguese governor of Goa.

It is said to be a strategically designed fort, not just holding panoramic views of the meeting of three water bodies, the Mandovi and Zuari rivers with the Arabian sea, but also of the river bay, Fort Aguada and the busy port of Mormugao. The scenic beauty and solitude combined with its uniqueness and planning are some of the attractions that remain at the Palacio do Cabo. The small church founded in 1541 at the very end of the mansion is dedicated to Our Lady of The Cape (Nossa Senhora do Cabo). This church also served as a landmark for the seafarers and celebrates its annual fest (feast) on 15 August.

The Palácio do Cabo is now known as the Raj Bhavan, the official name given to the residence of the governors of the states in India. It is also said to be among the finest residences of Indian governors owing to its location and display of Portuguese-Goan architecture. Indeed, it is said to hold the title as the oldest as no other residence of a governor of India has its origin over four hundred years ago.

== Architecture and antiques ==
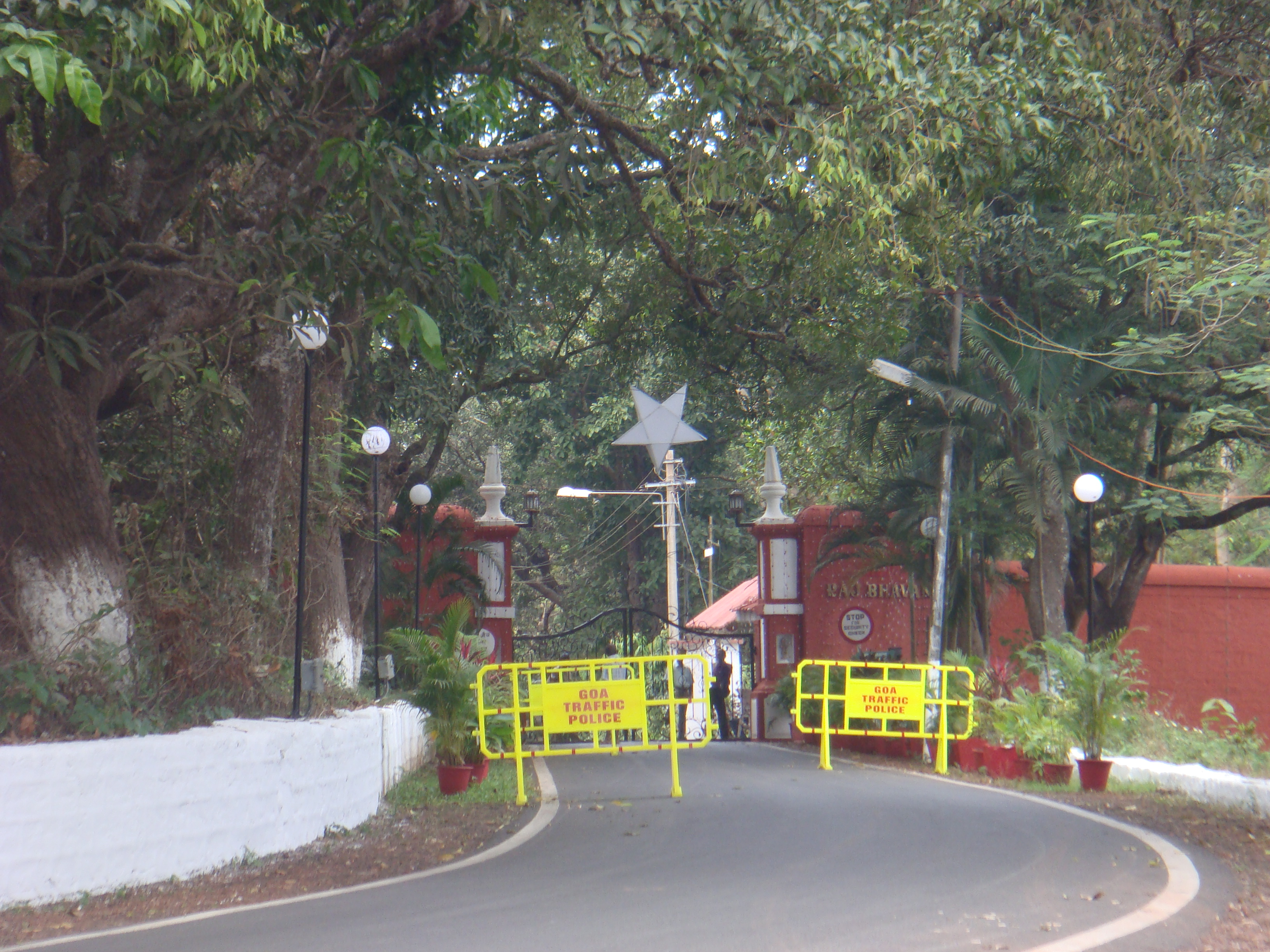
The gates to the Palácio in Panjim

The palace is a double-storey structure of great dimensions and architectural significance. While the ground level consists of the office chamber and residence of the governor in addition to few guest suites. The upper level holds halls for gatherings (Durbar hall), conferences and banquets along with the main kitchen and additional guest suites or rooms. A row of varandas (verandahs) elevated on pillars on the rear side of the mansion overlook the Mandovi river to the right, the Zuari river to the left, and the Arabian sea ahead.

Bohemian chandeliers, Chinese porcelain, silver and wooden furniture form the assets of this palace. The pieces of antique Chinese porcelain are said to be presumably manufactured in Canton. A worn-out set of crockery having a similar design with Portuguese coat of arms were specially ordered for the use of the Portuguese governor general. An excellent collection of high quality solid wooden furniture with exquisite workmanship adorn some of the spaces in this palatial mansion. A set of intricately carved chairs with figurines of Hindu gods and temples indicate the complete harmony between Christians and Hindus that existed in Goa. Five tall Cantonese vases believed to be over 300 years old as well as two large-sized Cantonese bowls, all of which hold the Portuguese coat of arms are among the prized antique items at the palace. So are two wooden Ormolu mounted chests with veneer wood inlay and carara marble tops. On the walls of the Durbar Hall are large mirrors and a painting of a fisherman by Francisco Jose Rezende (1866). Carved furniture of ingenious and rare workmanship form part of the collections of the palace – the quality of which has not diminished even after use for centuries, owing to the up-keep.

=== Renovation ===
During the years 1999 and 2000, the palace underwent a major renovation. In order to strengthen the structure as per expert advice, old wooden beams that held the upper level were replaced with steel beams. The beams are said to have been decayed over the years. The process was carried out in phases to allow for careful alterations and avoid any damages to the historically significant structure. In areas behind the palace facing the Arabian sea, considerable distress had been faced over the last few years in turn calling for major remedial steps to protect and preserve this historical building.

== Landmarks ==
=== Our Lady of The Cape Church ===
The over 500 year old Catholic church also known as Nossa Senhora do Cabo occupies a corner on the site with views of the bay and sea. It is open for morning masses on all Sundays as well as on special occasions like Christmas, Easter and the annual church feast. The Feast is celebrated on the morning of 15 August which also coincides with the Independence Day of India. Thousands of devotees, cutting across religious lines, attend the special prayers held on this occasion. A 'fest' and 'mela' is held annually on this day on the premises.

=== Grotto ===
A small distance away from the main church located on the slope, after descending through steps is the grotto dedicated to St. Paula. The altar in this grotto is installed in a cut-out of the cape rock and holds the saint's sculpture in a recumbent position. Behind it lies the image of Jesus on a trefoil cross. There is a common belief that those who offer prayers here will have their wishes fulfilled. The history associated with it as written on a board hung at the place, states as follows:

"St. Paula (347 – 404 A.D.), a Roman Senator's widow and her daughter Eustochium were living an austere life in Rome when St. Jerome (341 – 420 A.D.) came there from Palestine in 383 A.D. Four years later, mother and daughter followed the great doctor to Palestine and went with him to Egypt to visit the hermits in the Nitrain desert. Upon returning to the Holy Land, they settled at Bethlehem. Here, they erected a monastery under St. Jerome's direction and three convents ruled by St. Paula".

The Feast of the Grotto is celebrated in the evening on 2 August. A large number of faithful living on the estate as well as the nearby areas attend this annual tradition.

=== The estate ===
The Palácio do Cabo estate is surrounded on three sides by sea and has a total area of about 80 acres. One massive laterite stone wall exists to the East which serves as the estate's boundary on that side. On the sea-shore side there are masonry walls which have withstood the onslaught of time for over four centuries. The flat table land in the middle of the estate covers about 3/4th of the total land but it has steep side slopes towards the water bodies. About 5 hectares of the flat table land is occupied by buildings, gardens, lawns, and the remaining is full of vegetation consisting of large number of species of trees, plants, shrubs, creepers, etc. Adding new species of trees in large number has been an annual phenomenon at the palatial estate. The premises also have a kitchen garden where seasonal vegetables are grown.

The main garden in front of the palace consists of three lawns enclosed by seasonal flower beds. The Palacio estate has got the best prize for its well maintained gardens in year 2000 (State of Goa) and also bagged the second prize the following year. Various species of birds flock to the estate taking advantage of its location and vegetation. These include peacocks, eagles, kingfishers, tree-pies, doves, bee-eaters, etc. There are also a variety of reptiles like pythons, cobras, rat-snakes, chameleons and monitor-lizards. Smaller animals like mongoose, hare, jackals, squirrels and porcupines also reside on the estate. There have been no known cases over the years of any harm causes to residents or visitors alike. However the estate foot fall is also limited to the main buildings and surrounding areas. Special care is taken to protect, preserve and enrich the flora and fauna of the Palacio estate. In its form, the estate seems to serve as a treasure-house of bio-diversity incorporating the diverse flora and fauna of the Western Ghats.

=== The Estate Beach ===
Another tourist spot in the Palacio estate is a narrow strip of beach only accessible by a series of steps. There is a natural spring with sweet water about 20 meters away from the sea water towards the property. From here one can get a view of the Mormugão harbor. However, it is not safe for diving.

=== Cannon Point ===
On the western side just a three minutes drive from the main palace through the dense vegetation is a spot named "Cannon Point". A small park complete with pathways and lighting have been provided at this location owing to its scenic nature. Two old Portuguese-era cannons were retrieved from the shore below and placed on pedestals here.

=== The Jetty ===
There is also a non-operational jetty located where the Mandovi river joins the sea. It is presumed to have been in active use in the yesteryear's. Near the Portuguese era jetty is a flat area bound with scores of trees particularly the coconut tree, that gives enchanting Goa its paradise charm. This is a deal place to relax and let time pass in the typical Sussegado style. There is also a small narrow sandy strip but the place is not practical for swimming. Customary to Goan way of life, an old well daunts the estate at a comfortable 30 meters away from the sea coast.

== British Cemetery ==
Just outside the gates of Palacio do Cabo, there is a 180-year-old cemetery which is the only remaining evidence of the presence of the British forces in the fortress. British military personnel were stationed in Goa from 1799 to 1813, in order to assist the Portuguese against the French First Empire during the Peninsular War. During this period the British also constructed several edifices in the Forte Aguada, Gasper Dias and Mormugão areas but most of these were demolished by the Portuguese in 1848 leaving little presence, if any, of their arrival. The cemetery was built sometime in 1802 to serve the purpose of British garrisons stationed at Forte Mormugão, Palacio do Cabo and Forte Aguada. Mr. W. Walker, a traveler once described the cemetery in 1855. He stated:

"I visited the burial ground at Cabo built and used by the British force of 10,000 (sic) men when they held possession of the seaboard points of Goa, to prevent the French entering India by this route in 1805. The massive laterite stone wall which surrounds it is as perfect as the day it was built, the laterite in this neighborhood being the best I have anywhere seen, but the lofty arched entrance gates have long been despoiled of every particle of wood. The burial ground is used for rice cultivation and the very tombstones are worn down from the sharpening of native tools on them; where not cultivated, it is overgrown with high rank grass said to be alive with deadly cobras de capello. If it be true, as I have heard, that the Collector of Belgaum allows an annual sum to keep in order, I can assure him that not a piece worth of care is bestowed on it."

On 19 May 1869 a request was made by the then Government of British India to the governor-general of Portuguese India to repair and maintain the cemetery, which was considered by the Portuguese government in Goa. Sr. Gerson da Cunha described the cemetery in 1878 as an oblong area about 180 yards by 145 yards long with an enclosed wall all around and a massive ornamental gate of teak wood. The key to this door was with the chaplain of a neighboring convent. There are 47 tombstones and 56 gravestones in the cemetery.

The cemetery which was repaired by the British consul in 1941 is now in good condition. The old wooden gate has since been replaced by a metal one. Out of the six mango trees which were there in the past, two have survived. There is a well inside the cemetery which is dry. The earliest burial according to the tomb plates was on 19 December 1808 and the latest on 10 August 1912.
