= Laburnum For My Head =

2009 short story collection by Temsüla Ao

Laburnum for My Head
- First edition
- Author: Temsüla Ao
- Language: English
- Genre: Short stories
- Publisher: Penguin India
- Publication date: 14 November 2009
- Publication place: India
- Media type: Print (paperback)
- Pages: 107 pp
- ISBN: 978-0-143-06620-0
- OCLC: 500498010
- Preceded by: These Hills Called Home: Stories From A War Zone

Laburnum for My Head (2009) is the collection of eight short stories by Indian author Temsüla Ao. The stories are about the lives of people from the vibrant and troubled region of Nagaland in northeast India.

The collection brought its author the 2013 Sahitya Akademi Award for English, conferred by the Sahitya Akademi, India's National Academy of Letters.

== Stories ==
- Laburnum For My Head. A strange obsession of a woman for laburnum flowers. Unable to successfully grow a laburnum plant on her garden during her lifetime, she wants to have one over her grave.
- Death of a Hunter. A brave hunter, Imchanok, totters when the ghost of his prey haunts him, till he offers it a tuft of his hair as a prayer for forgiveness.
- The Boy Who Sold an Airfield. Pokenmong, the servant boy, by dint of his wit, sells an airfield to unsuspecting villagers.
- The Letter. A letter found on a dead insurgent blurs the boundaries between him and an innocent villager, both struggling to make ends meet.
- Three Women. A woman's terrible secret comes full circle, changing her daughter's and granddaughter's lives as well as her own.
- A Simple Question. An illiterate village woman's simple question rattles an army officer and forces him to set her husband free.
- Sonny. A young girl loses her lover in his fight for the motherland, leaving her a frightful legacy.
- Flight. A caterpillar finds wings.

== Reception ==
The collection received generally favorable reviews. Writing for Biblio: A Review of Books, Anusua Mukherjee compares the voice of the narrator to that "of an elderly village woman telling the tales, who has been there and seen it all, and in the wisdom born of endurance, can smoothen the jagged edges of experience in the rich texture of the tapestry that is the stories she weaves." On a critical note, Mukherjee also goes on to say that the dry writing style which is the strength of Ao's poetry, "parches the prose, making it too flat at times." However, writing for Business Standard, Vineeta Rai suggests that "the simplicity of the language hides the complexity of emotions and themes she has written about, and the stories linger on long after the pages have been turned and the book closed."

== Awards ==
- Sahitya Akademi Award for English - December, 2013
