= Jahnavi Barua =

Indian author

- Born: Assam
- Occupation: Author

Jahnavi Barua is an Indian author from Assam. She is the author of Next Door, a collection of short stories set in Assam with insurgency as the background. Barua lives in Bangalore, and obtained her MBBS at Gauhati Medical College but does not practice medicine. She studied creative writing in the United Kingdom.

A Rebirth is not so much about parenting as it is about the unique bond between mother and child. Undertow is a novel about migration, exile and loneliness in a post-pandemic world.

== Bibliography ==
- Next Door (Penguin India, 2008) ISBN 978-0143064527
- Rebirth (Penguin India, 2010) ISBN 978-0143414551
- Undertow (Penguin India, 2020) ISBN 978-0670093731

== Nominations and awards ==
- 2005 Short Fiction contest hosted by Unisun Publishers
- 2006 Short Fiction contest hosted by Unisun Publishers (Second prize, Children's fiction category).
- 2009 Frank O'Connor International Short Story Award, longlist.
- 2011 Man Asian Literary Prize, shortlist, Rebirth
- 2012 Commonwealth Book Prize shortlist
- 2020 JCB Prize for Literature longlist
- 2021 AutHer Awards for her work, Undertow (2020)
- Charles Wallace India Trust Scholarship for Creative Writing

== See also ==
- Literature from North East India
- Indian English Literature
