= Siddhartha Deb =

Indian author

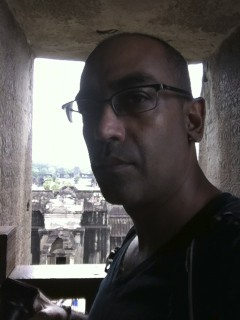
- Siddhartha Deb in 2012
- Born: 1970 (age 55–56); Shillong, Meghalaya, India
- Education: Columbia University
- Occupations: Writer; journalist; essayist; professor
- Writing career
- Language: English
- Notable awards: PEN Open Book Award; 2012 The Beautiful and the Damned
- Website: siddharthadeb.com

Siddhartha Deb (born 1970) is an American author.

== Life ==
He was born in Shillong, the capital city of Meghalaya state in northeastern India. He was educated at Calcutta University and at Columbia University, US. Deb began his career in journalism as a sports journalist in Calcutta in 1994 before moving to Delhi where he wrote longform features, cultural essays, and book reviews. His work included longform pieces on the drowning of 68 coal miners in present-day Jharkhand, the life of migrant workers at a spice market in Delhi, and the fate of Muslim singers who historically performed at Hindu and Sikh religious ceremonies as well at Muslim places of worship, and who were being marginalized by India's simultaneous embrace of neoliberalism and Hindu nationalism. In 1998, Deb moved to New York on a graduate fellowship from the Department of English and Comparative Literature at Columbia University. Shortly after, he published his first novel, The Point of Return. It is semi-autobiographical in nature and set in a fictional town that closely resembles Shillong in India's Northeast. It was a New York Times Notable Book of the Year. His second novel, Surface, also set in Northeast India, is about a disillusioned Sikh journalist. It was published in the United States as An Outline of the Republic.

His first non-fiction book, The Beautiful And the Damned: A Portrait of the New India was published in June 2011 by Viking Penguin and by FSG/Faber. The Indian edition of the book had to be published without its first chapter because of a defamation lawsuit by one of the subjects portrayed in the first chapter.

His latest novel The Light at the End of the World was published in 2023. The Kashmiri writer Feroze Rather described it in The Nation as "an enraged epic but also one full of humanity; its various epochs of bigotry, intolerance, and hate are interspersed with tender moments of solidarity, love, and compassion."

Deb has contributed to The Boston Globe, The Guardian, The Nation, New Statesman, Harper's, the London Review of Books, and The Times Literary Supplement. From 2015 to 2017, Deb was a columnist for the Bookends column of the New York Times Book Review. During the same period, he was also a columnist for Baffler magazine.

== Awards and honors ==
An Outline of the Republic was a finalist for the 2005 Hutch-Crossword Award (India) and was longlisted for the 2006 Impac Dublin Literary Award. It was also named Best Book of the Year by The Daily Telegraph (London) in 2005. The Beautiful and the Damned: Life in the New India was shortlisted for the 2012 Orwell Prize and won the 2012 PEN Open Book Award. “The Mouse” was listed among “Other Distinguished Stories” in The Best American Short Stories 2012, edited by Tom Perrotta.

In 2024, Deb won the Anthony Veasna So Fiction Prize from n+1. Other honors include a 1999 Robert John Bennett Memorial Award for Best Comparative Essay from Columbia University and the 1998 Marjorie Hope Nicholson Fellowship for graduate study at Columbia. He was awarded research and writing grants from the Nation Investigative Fund in 2009, the Society of Authors in 2007, and held fellowships at the Radcliffe Institute for Advanced Studies at Harvard University (2009–2010), the Howard Foundation at Brown University (2015–2016), and the George Orwell Foundation in London (2019). He also received residencies from MacDowell (2013), Seoul Art Space Yeonhui (2017), and the Centre for International Writers and Translators in Rhodes, Greece (2018).

== Bibliography ==
Siddhartha Deb talks about The Beautiful and the Damned
00:06:02

=== Fiction ===
- The Point of Return. HarperCollins. 2003. ISBN 978-0060501532.
- An Outline of the Republic. HarperCollins. 2005. ISBN 0060501553. published by Picador in the UK as Surface.
- Fraternity. Toluca Editions. 2007. a collaborative project published as a limited edition book with photographer Mitch Epstein
- Deb, Siddhartha (30 May 2023). The Light at the End of the World. Soho Press. ISBN 978-1-64129-466-9.

=== Non-fiction ===
- The Beautiful and the Damned : Life in the New India. Viking Penguin. 2011. ISBN 978-0865478626.
- Twilight Prisoners: The Rise of the Hindu Right and the Fall of India. Haymarket Books. 2024.

== See also ==
- Indian literature
- Indian English literature
- Literature from North East India
