= Manohar Shetty =

Indian poet (born 1953)

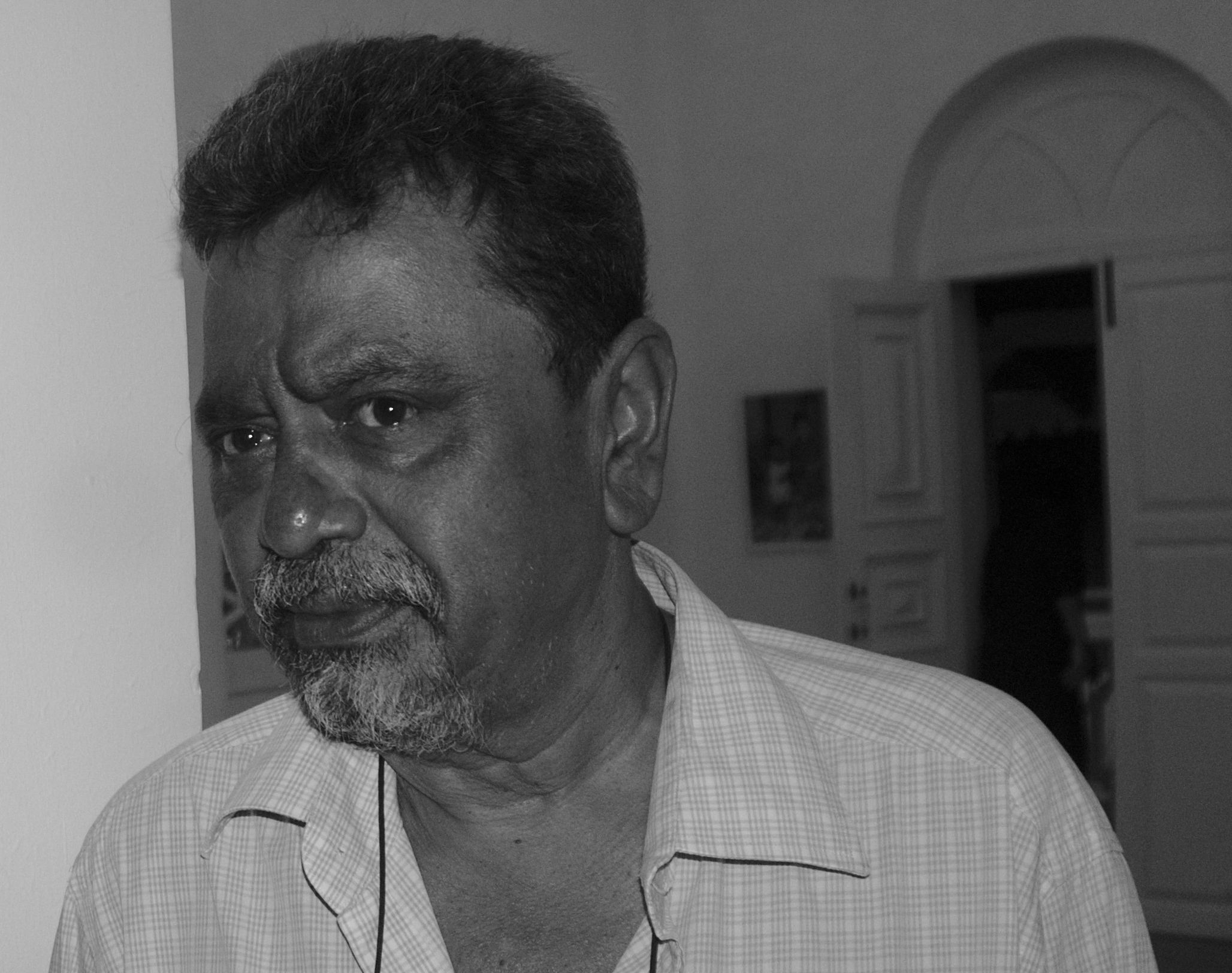
- Shetty in 2017
- Born: 1953 (age 72–73); Bombay, Bombay State, India
- Occupations: Writer, poet, editor
- Spouse: Devika Sequeira
- Children: 2
- Writing career
- Language: English
- Years active: 1981–present
- Genres: Poetry, short story, anthology
- Notable works: Ferry Crossings; work included in The Oxford India Anthology of Twelve Modern Indian Poets.

Manohar Shetty (born 1953) is an Indian poet, writer, and literary editor based in Goa, India. He is considered as one of the prominent Indian poets writing in the English language.

He has been a Senior Fellow with the Sahitya Akademi, the Indian academy of arts and letters, and his work is found in several anthologies, including The Oxford India Anthology of Twelve Modern Indian Poets edited by Arvind Krishna Mehrotra and anthologies edited by Eunice de Souza, Vilas Sarang and Jeet Thayil.

== Early life ==
Manohar Shetty was born in Bombay and educated in Panchgani. He graduated from Bombay University in 1974 and began working as a journalist.

== Critical perspectives ==
Shetty's poetry is seen as being an integral part of the "chronology of modern Indian English poetry." His poetry is described as revelling in "the celebration of the sombre" and being filled with "sepulchral images" while their "mood is predominantly one of helplessness and lethargy."

Shetty is listed in Sudeep Sen's essay "New Indian Poetry: The 1990s Perspective", published in World Literature Today, Vol. 68, No. 2. K. Narayana Chandran of the University of Hyderabad, while reviewing Shetty's Domestic Creatures in World Literature Today, comments: "To be able to write magnificently about the little world one knows – and what passionate care all this involves – is no small gift for a poet. Manohar Shetty is an eminently gifted poet in this sense."

In another review of Shetty's A Guarded Space, in 1982 in the same journal (World Literature Today), S. Amanuddin is more critical. New Delhi-based magazine Caravan described Shetty as "something of a rarity among Indian English poets of his and preceding generations, who have tended to be rather less consistent in their output."

== Poetry volumes ==
As of 2017, he has published eight volumes of poetry. They are:

- Morning Light. Delhi: Copper Coin, 2016
- Personal Effects, Delhi: Copper Coin, 2015
- Living Rooms, New Delhi: HarperCollins, 2014
- Creatures Great and Small, Delhi: Copper Coin, 2014
- Body Language, Mumbai: Poetrywala, 2012
- Domestic Creatures: Poems, New Delhi: Oxford University Press, 1994
- Borrowed Time, Bombay: Praxis, 1988
- A Guarded Space, Bombay: Newground, 1981

== Books edited ==
- Ferry Crossing – Short Stories from Goa, New Delhi: Penguin India, 1998
- Goa Travels, Being the Accounts of Travellers to Goa from the 16th to the 20th Century, New Delhi: Rupa, 2014
- Special edition on English language poets of India for Poetry Wales.

== Fellowships awarded ==
Earlier, he has been a Homi Bhaba Fellow and a Senior Sahitya Akademi Fellow.

== Translations, evaluation of work ==
His work has been translated into Finnish, German, Italian, Marathi and Slovenian.

Evaluations of his work have been included in Modern Indian Poetry in English (New Delhi: OUP, 1987, 2011, Bruce King Ed.) and An Illustrated History of Indian Literature in English (New Delhi: Permanent Black, 2003, Arvind Krishna Mehrotra, Ed.).

His work has appeared in The Baffler (US), the London Magazine, Poetry Review, Poetry Wales, Wasafiri, Chelsea (US), Rattapallax (US), Fulcrum (US), Shenandoah (US), The Common (US), New Letters (US), Helix (Australia).

== Personal life ==
He has been based in Goa since 1985. Shetty is based in Dona Paula, a suburb some seven kilometres from the state capital of Panjim (Panaji) in Goa. He has written an account of his experiences with alcohol in the book House Spirit: Drinking in India – Stories, Essays, Poems (Speaking Tiger Books).
