= The Girl from Nongrim Hills =

2013 novel by Ankush Saikia

- Author: Ankush Saikia
- Language: English
- Genre: Fiction
- Published: 2013, Penguin India
- Publication place: India
- Media type: Print, e-book
- Pages: 240 pages
- ISBN: 0143421190
- Preceded by: Spotting Veron and other Stories
- Followed by: Dead Meat (Arjun Arora no.1)

The Girl from Nongrim Hills is a 2013 fiction novel by Indian author Ankush Saikia. The book was first published on October 1, 2013, through Penguin India and is Saikia's second novel, following his 2007 book Jet City Woman and is his third published book.

== Development ==
Saikia came up with the idea for The Girl from Nongrim Hills after coming up with the idea of "money changing hands in a hotel room in Shillong" and came up with two of the book's characters shortly afterwards. He chose to include elements such as extortion, arms smuggling, and kidnapping as they were "only too common in the Northeast" and believed that it would "provide the basis for a good noir story". He chose to set the story in Shillong as he was familiar with the area and saw that several scenes in the book would work well with the city. He based the characters of Bok and Kitdor on several Shillong boys he knew and took Bok's enjoyment of 80s music from Saikia's own enjoyment of the music from that era. It took Saikia ten months to write The Girl from Nongrim Hills and he found the editing and resolution of the novel to be the most challenging aspects of its writing.

== Reception ==
Critical reception The Girl from Nongrim Hills has been mostly positive. IBNLive noted that while the book did have one inaccuracy, they found the book hard to put down and enjoyed Saikia's writing overall. The New Indian Express and Deccan Herald also gave positive reviews for The Girl from Nongrim Hills, and both papers praised the book for its characters and pacing.
