= International Centre, Goa =

Coordinates: 15.459°N 73.821°E

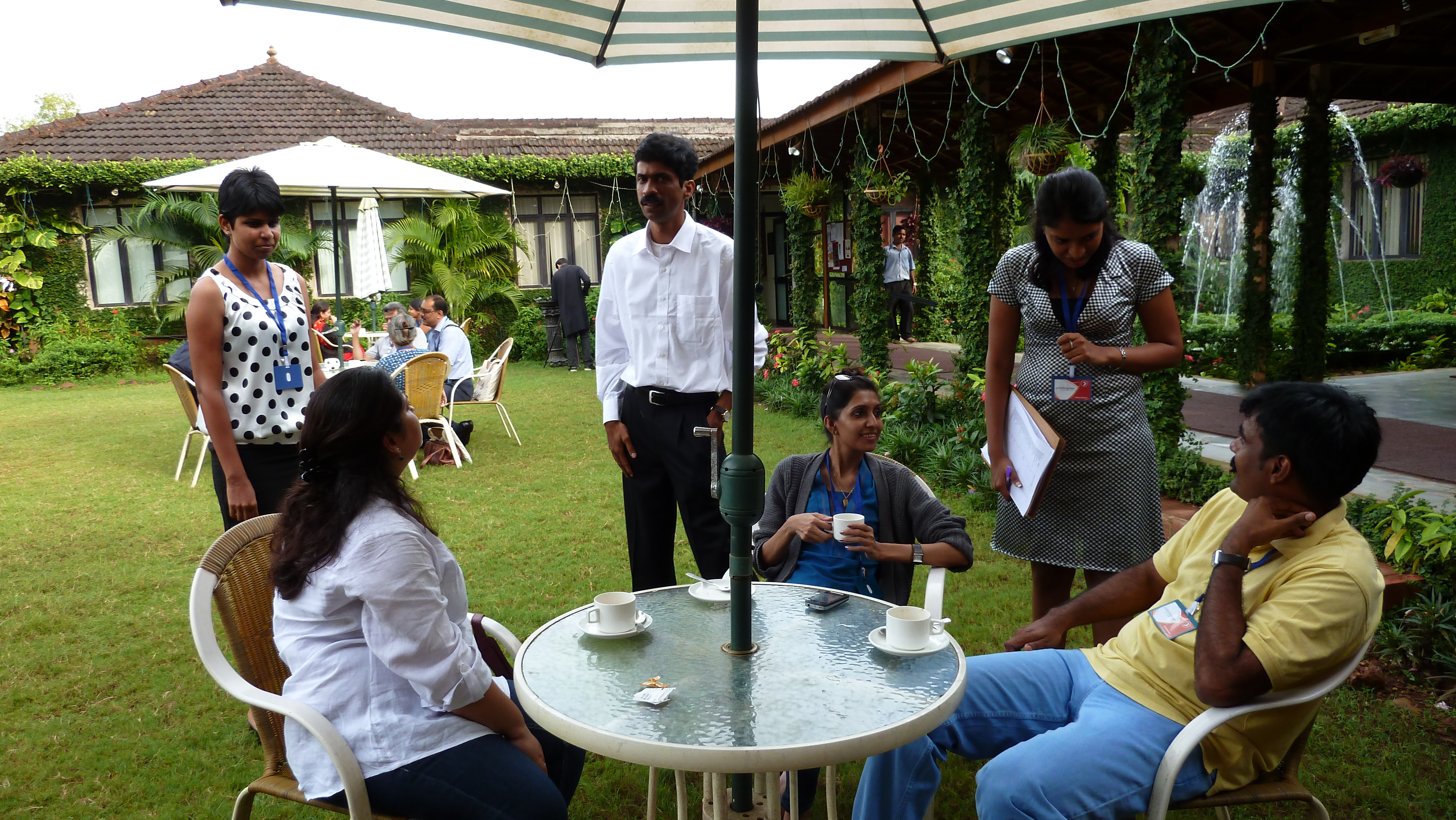
An event at ICG -- Publishing Next, which started off here. Photo from an early, 2011, event.

International Centre, Goa is a prominent conference centre, seminars venue, and cultural space in the western Indian state of Goa. It is located at Dona Paula, outside Panjim (Panjim). Its setting up has been supported, among others, by the Ford Foundation.

Launched over a decade-and-half ago, it is seen as a prominent place for bringing "thought leaders" together for research and sharing of knowledge and ideas at a local, national and international level. It is known for its frequent lectures, talks and workshops.

International Centre, Goa is a not-for-profit autonomous society founded in June 1987, though supported in part by the government. It was inaugurated on 18 June 1996, and is located in Goa, India. It says its vision is to "bring together thinkers, scholars, academics, achievers, sociologists, industrialists and creative people from India and around the world." It is patterned loosely on the India International Centre at New Delhi, a non-government institution that is considered one of India's premier cultural institutions and "where statesmen, diplomats, policymakers, intellectuals, scientists, jurists, writers, artists and members of civil society meet".

== Focus ==
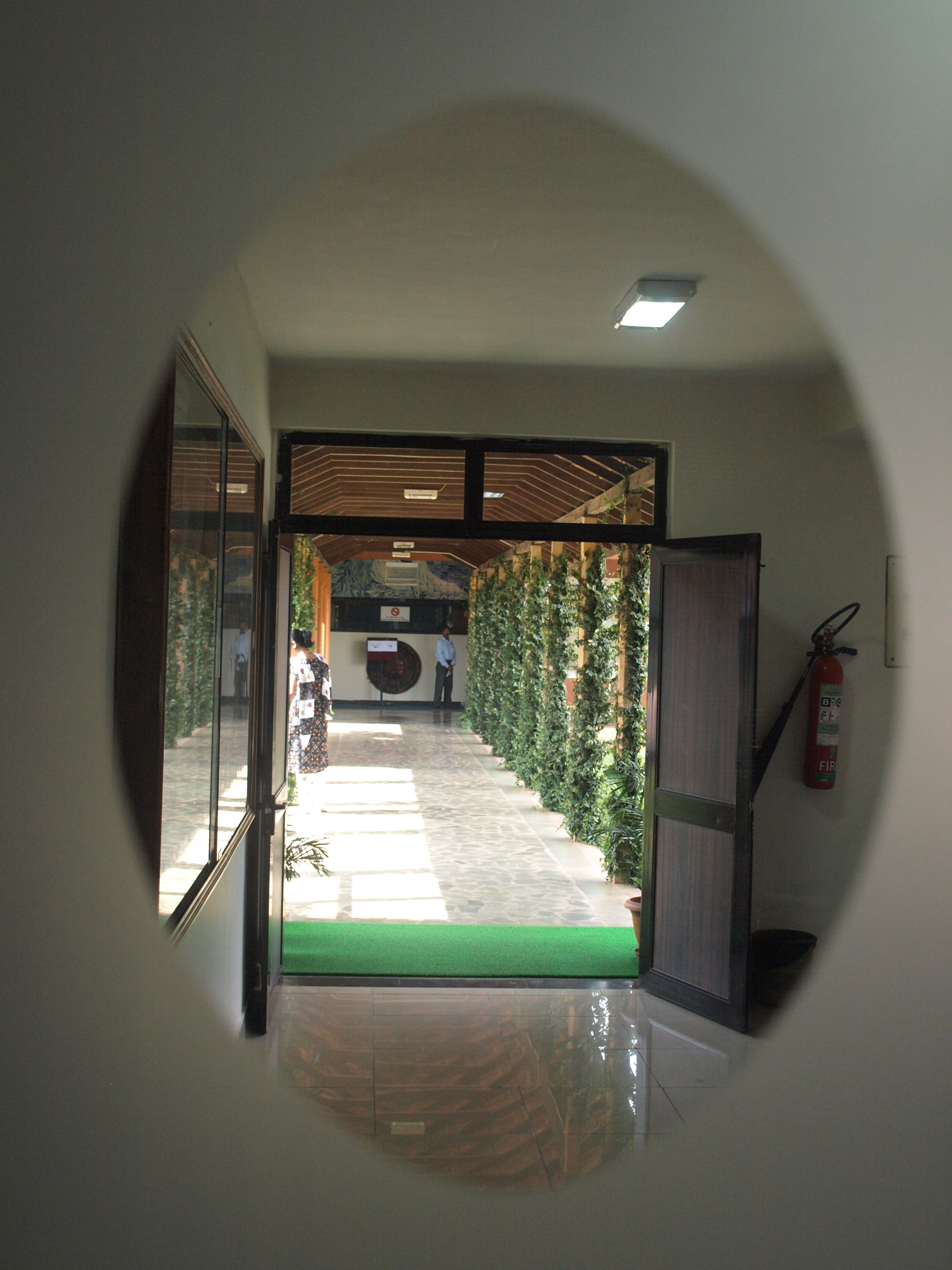
International Centre, Goa.

It attempts to bring together socio-cultural activities, political dialogue, economic debates and programmes such as film festivals, exhibitions, workshops, concerts, plays, quiz, painting competitions and social evenings.

In Goa, the ICG is one of the prominent centres for cultural events, discussions and musical performances, international, national and local.

== Home to the GALF ==
The Centre is home to the Goa Arts and Literature Festival (GALF), which is the premier and only literary festival held in Goa that cuts across diverse languages and attracts participation from the rest of India and overseas.

It says that on an average a "minimum of" 20,000 people visit it annually.

== Life Trustees ==
It is run by a board of life trustees, who include industrialists Yatin Kakodkar and Dattaraj Salgaocar, former Goa chief minister Pratapsing Raoji Rane, additional solicitor general advocate A.N.S. Nadkarni, economist Dr Ligia Noronha, former State Bank of India chairman P.G. Kakodkar, former Council of Scientific and Industrial Research chairman Dr. R.A. Mashelkar, industrialist Shrinivas Dempo and lawyer Subhalaxmi Naik. It also has elected trustees, Government of Goa representatives, and a member secretary.

Nandini Sahai was involved closely in building the institution in its early years, where she was its fourth Director, the first woman to hold the post. She was instrumental in launching the Goa Arts and Literature Festival (GALF) via the ICG. Earlier, she was a developmental journalist with some 35 years in the field. During her stint here and beyond, she has focussed on issues relating to human development, media problems of women, children and youth, the right to information and the judiciary, among others.

== Events held at the venue ==
Some of the major and prestigious events held at the ICG include, till its move to the Goa State Central Library in Goa, the PublishingNext conference for publishing professionals from across India; the Goa Arts and Literature Festival (GALF), the Difficult Dialogues meeting, among others. This centre also undertakes a significant amount of international discussion and dialogue.

== Reception ==
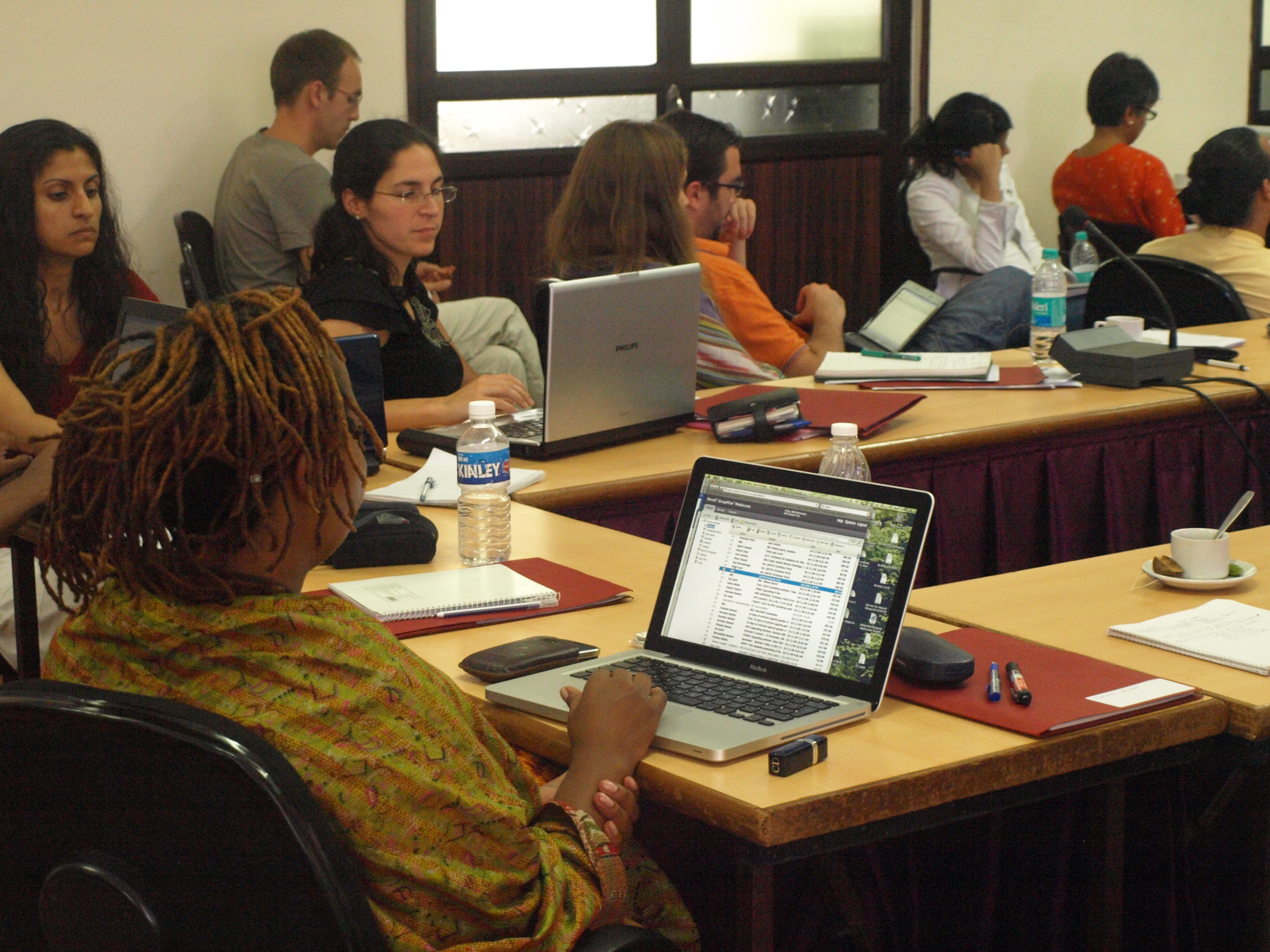
Foreign and Indian participants at an event at the International Centre Goa.

On taking over as its director, Raj Doctor argued that the Centre might have "deviated from its core objective of ideation.... What I do know, however, is that we have to bring back the International Centre Goa from dealing with softer issues, to more hard core ideation plans."
