= Odette Mascarenhas =

Indian food historian and author

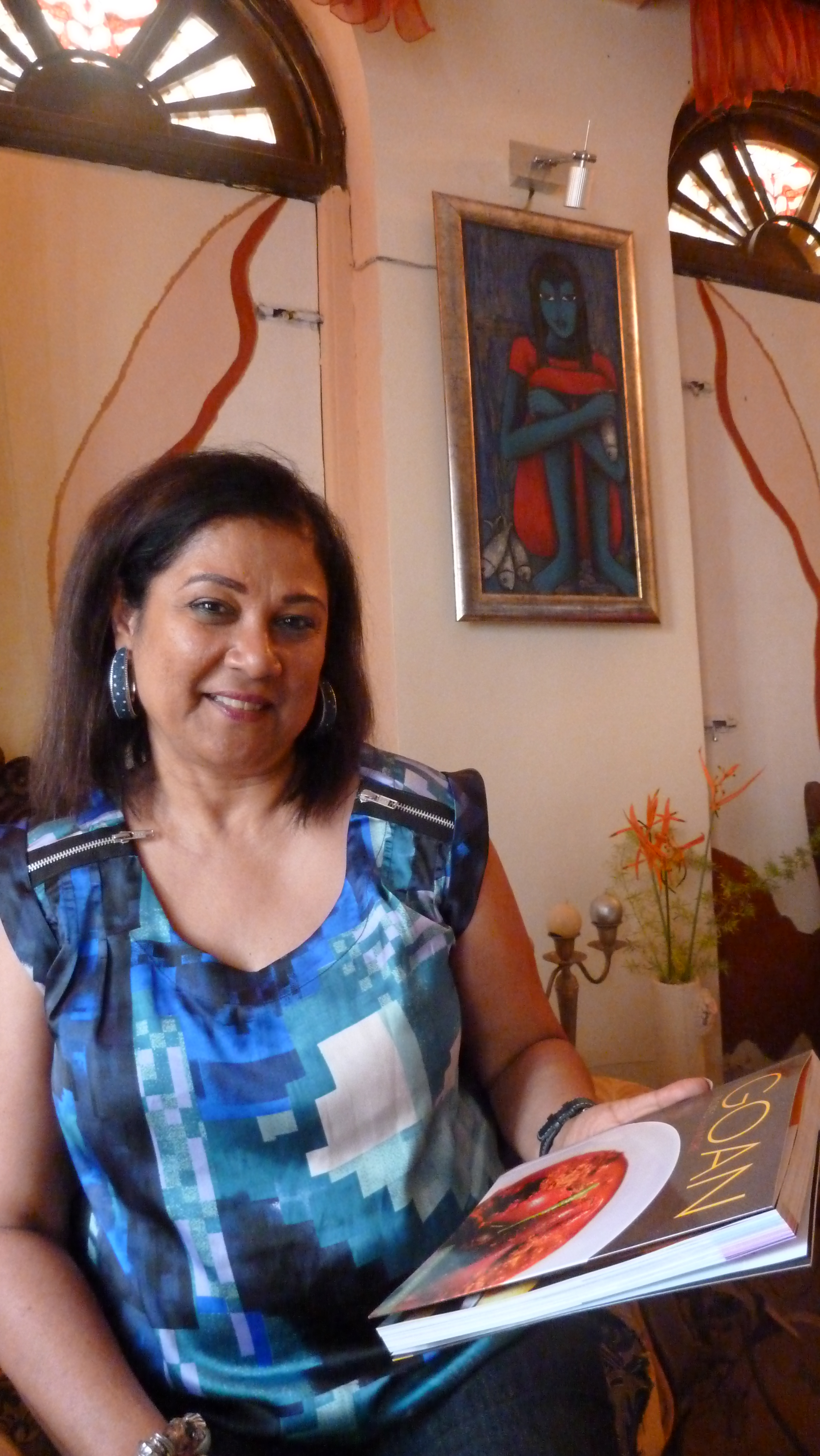
- Mascarenhas in 2011
- Spouse: Joe Mascarenhas (m. 1983)
- Writing career
- Subject: Culinary history of Goa
- Notable work: The Culinary Heritage of Goa

Odette Mascarenhas is an Indian food historian, author, television host, and curator of Goan culinary culture. Through her writing, research, and media appearances, she has contributed to documenting and preserving the food heritage of Goa.

== Career ==
Mascarenhas has written books, hosted television programs, and curated experiences, all with the intention of promoting the culinary heritage of Goa.

Among her most recognized contributions is her documentation of Portuguese-influenced Goan recipes and traditions, which she has compiled in her writings. She is the author of several books on Goan food, with a focus on how historical and cultural influences have shaped the local cuisine. Her 2015 book, The Culinary Heritage of Goa, was awarded as the Best in the World for Historical Recipes at the Gourmand World Cookbook held at Yangtai. Her 2023 book, The Culinary Odyssey of Goa, covers the history and culture of Goan food. She has written 12 books, including a series of books for children called Alfie Alphonso.

== Community involvement ==
Beyond writing and television, Mascarenhas has been active in creating immersive culinary experiences. She collaborates with chefs, cultural institutions, and heritage homes to provide curated events that trace the evolution of Goan dishes. These efforts often include local voices and aim to build awareness about traditional ingredients, preparation techniques, and historical narratives.

She also hosts travellers in Goa, offering them authentic cultural and gastronomic experiences.

== Personal life ==
Odette Mascarenhas has been married to Joe Mascarenhas since 1983.

== Works ==
- Alfie Alphonso series of books
- The Culinary Heritage of Goa (2015)
- The Culinary Odyssey of Goa (2023)
