= Siddhartha Sarma =

Indian writer

- Born: Assam
- Writing career
- Language: English
- Notable works: The Grasshopper's Run; East of The Sun; Year of the Weeds; Carpenters and Kings; Twilight in a Knotted World
- Notable awards: 2010 Vodafone Crossword Book Award; 2011 Bal Sahitya Puraskar

Siddhartha Sarma is an Indian novelist and journalist from Assam who writes in English.

== Biography ==
Siddhartha Sarma is from Guwahati, Assam. While working as a journalist for a business magazine in Delhi, he published the young adult novel The Grasshopper's Run with Scholastic in 2009. To write the novel, he conducted archival research and incorporated stories he was told by his grandfather. The story is set in Assam and Nagaland during the Second World War and follows the friendship between a Naga and Assamese boy.

Nilanjana S Roy recommended the book, and it won the 2010 Vodafone Crossword Book Award in the Children's Literature category. In 2011, Sarma was awarded the Bal Sahitya Puraskar for The Grasshopper's Run by the Sahitya Academy.

He has also written East of The Sun, a travelogue published in 2011 based on his travels in the North East, and emails he sent to friends to describe his journey. In 2018, he published the novel Year of the Weeds, which is based on the Dongria Kondh campaign against mining.

In 2019, he published the non-fiction book Carpenters and Kings: Western Christianity and the Idea of India after nine years of research on a concept he developed while completing his thesis for a Master of Letters at the University of Glasgow. His next novel, titled Twilight in a Knotted World, was released in September 2020. In 2021, his work was published in the essay collection Where the Gods Dwell.

== See also ==
- Indian English Literature
- Literature from North East India
