= Ankush Saikia =

Indian author (born 1975)

Ankush Saikia (born 1975 in Tezpur, Assam) is an Indian author. He grew up in Madison, Wisconsin; Assam; and Shillong, Meghalaya. Saikia has previously worked as a journalist at India Today, indiaabroad.com, and Express India, and as a senior editor in the publishing firm Dorling Kindersley (India).

He was shortlisted for the Outlook–Picador India non-fiction writing award (2005), and was one of the recipients of the Shanghai Writers' Association's 2018 fellowships. He has also written features and long-form pieces (mostly on North East India) for Tehelka, Scroll.in, Hindustan Times, fountainink.in, The Caravan, Assam Tribune, Eclectic Northeast, DailyO, Indian Express, The Hindu etc.

His 8th book, The Forest Beneath the Mountains, an environmental novel set along the borderlands of Assam and Arunachal Pradesh in North-East India, and his 9th book, Tears of the Dragon (the 4th book in the Detective Arjun Arora series), were both published by Speaking Tiger Books, in March 2021 and February 2023, respectively. Saikia's 10th book was the Delhi-based crime novella A Natural History of Violence and his 11th book (and 9th novel) was Rough Streets, a coming-of-age tale with a crime angle set in 1980s Shillong: both were self-published as e-books in 2024.

== Bibliography ==
- Jet City Woman (2007)
- Spotting Veron and other Stories (2011)
- The Girl from Nongrim Hills (2013)
- Red River, Blue Hills (2015)
- Dead Meat (2015)
- Remember Death (2016)
- More Bodies Will Fall (2018)
- The Forest Beneath the Mountains (2021)
- Tears of the Dragon (2023)
- A Natural History of Violence (2024)
- Rough Streets (2024)
