= Srutimala Duara =

Indian academician and writer (died 2023)

- Born: c. 1965
- Died: 27 February 2023 (aged 57)
- Occupations: Associate professor, writer
- Writing career
- Language: English and Assamese
- Genres: Fiction, children's literature, poetry, nonfiction, memoir
- Notable work: Traveling with Dreams
- Notable awards: Woman of the Year 2016; Indian Women Achievers Award in Literature 2021
- Website: srutimaladuara.in

Srutimala Duara (c. 1965 – 27 February 2023) was an Indian academician and bilingual writer from Assam. She wrote novels, short stories, and children's literature in English and Assamese, and poetry in English. She was an associate professor and head of the English department of Handique Girls College, Guwahati. In 2021, she was awarded the Indian Women Achievers Award in Literature by the Asian Literary Society.

== Biography ==
Duara published novels, collections of short stories, children's literature, and essay collections in English and Assamese. She also wrote six anthologies of poetry in English.

She was an Associate Professor and head of the department of English of Handique Girls College, Guwahati.

Duara was a founder member and has been the secretary and treasurer of Northeast Writers' Forum, an organization with eight chapters in the Northeast of India.

Duara also recited poetry, and her CD of recited Assamese poetry "Ekajoli Kobita" was released in 2015. She has recited and acted in two poetry videos "Smriti" and "Sagar" published on YouTube.

Duara also wrote for The Times of India, The Hindu, and The Assam Tribune.

Duara died from ovarian cancer on 27 February 2023, at the age of 57.

== Awards and honours ==
Duara was awarded the "Naari Shakti Award" by Lions Club in April 2015. In 2016, she received the "Woman of the Year" award from the International Human Rights Council, Assam Chapter. In 2021, she was awarded the Indian Women Achievers Award in Literature by the Asian Literary Society.

== Bibliography ==
=== Novels ===
- Traveling with Dreams (Spectrum, 2001)
- Maya's Party (BR Publishing Corp, 2003)
- Ashes in the Seas (BR Pub Corp, 2003)

=== Short story collections ===
- The Sunset and Other Stories (Spectrum, 1998)
- Waiting for the Last Breath (Spectrum, 1999)
- The Jhoolan Evening (Spectrum, 2000)

=== Poetry collections ===
- By the Brahmaputra and Other Poems (2018)
- Along my Route (2020)

=== Children's books ===
- Sadhukathar Desh (1995)
- Sadhukathar Bagicha (1996)
- Sadhukathar Tupula (1996)
- Dhekura Kukurar Club (2019)

=== Nonfiction ===
- (editor) Assam: Myriad Perspectives (Spectrum, 2014)
- My Journey Through Cancer (2022)

== Personal life ==
Duara died at age 57 after being diagnosed with ovarian cancer. She is survived by her husband and two children.

== See also ==
- Literature from North East India
- Indian English literature
