= Amruta Patil =

Indian graphic artist and writer (b. 1979)

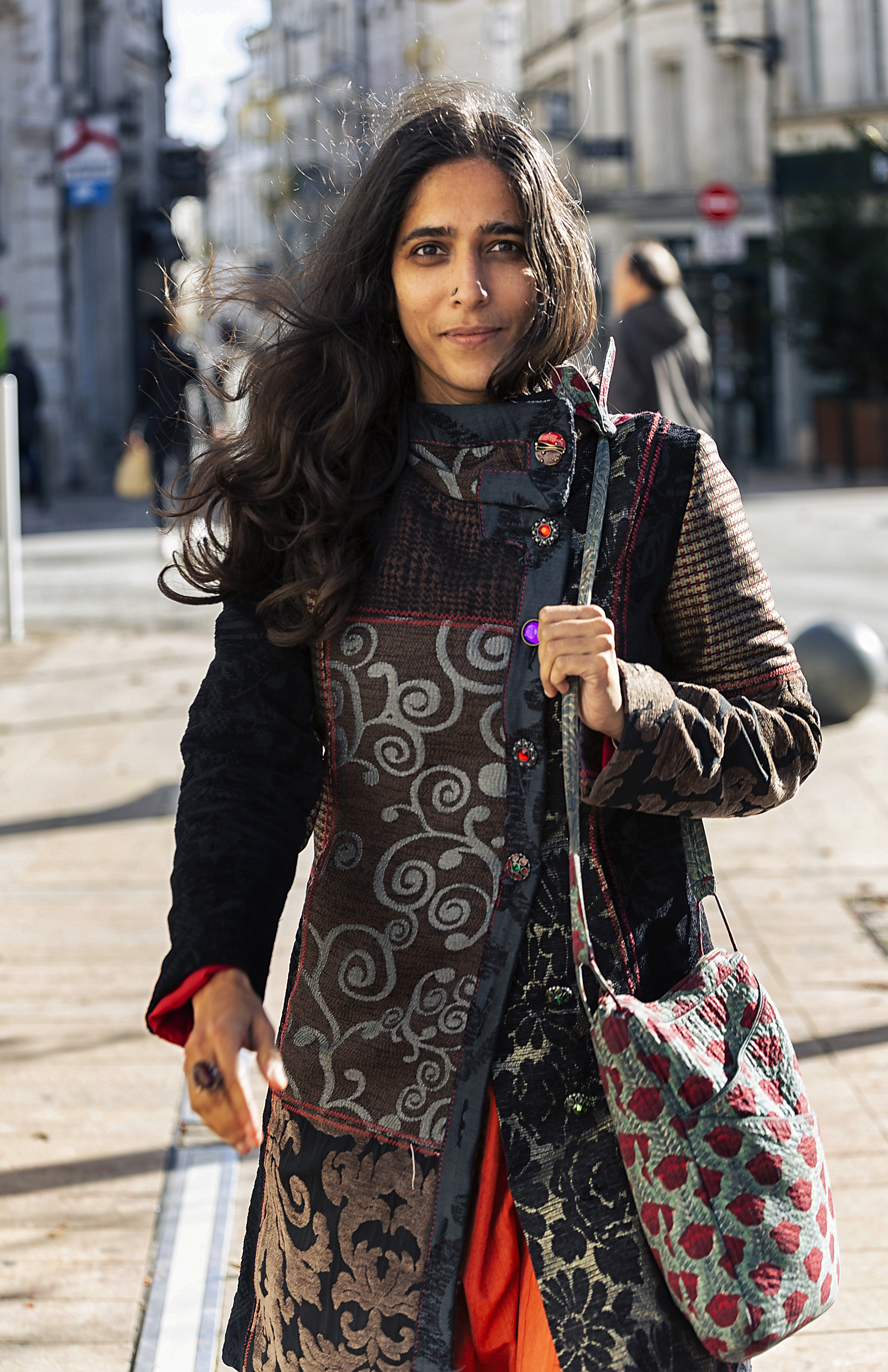
- Born: 19 April 1979 (age 47); Pune, India
- Occupations: Graphic novelist, painter, and writer
- Writing career
- Period: 2008 – present
- Genre: Graphic novels
- Subjects: Mythology, ecology, and intersectional feminism

Amruta Patil (born 19 April 1979) is an Indian graphic novel author and painter.

== Background ==
Amruta Patil was raised in Goa, where her father served in the Indian Navy. She has a BFA degree from Goa College of Art (1999), and Master of Fine Arts degree from Tufts University, School of the Museum of Fine Arts in Boston (2004).

== Early career ==
Amruta Patil worked as a copywriter at Enterprise Nexus (Mumbai) in 1999-2000. She was the co-founder and editor of the quarterly magazine, 'Mindfields' (2007-2012). She was awarded a TED Fellowship in 2009.

== Graphic Novels ==
Amruta Patil's debut graphic novel, Kari (2008), commissioned and published by VK Karthika at HarperCollins India, explored themes of sexuality, friendship, and death; and heralded Patil as India's first female graphic novelist. A self proclaimed "oddball" who grew up in a small town without much exposure to comics culture, Patil has spoken about her autodidactic process and evolving style. Kari has been the subject of various academic dissertations.

Her two subsequent graphic novels Adi Parva: Churning of the Ocean (2012) and Sauptik: Blood and Flowers (2016) form the Parva Duology which retells stories from the Mahabharata from the viewpoint of the outlier narrators (sutradhar) Ganga and Ashwatthama respectively. Speaking about these two novels, she talks about her decision to choose the two above-mentioned narrators because of their peripheral role in traditional retellings of the lore. The importance of the sutradhar has been reiterated - as a "way of bringing the stories closer to the present."

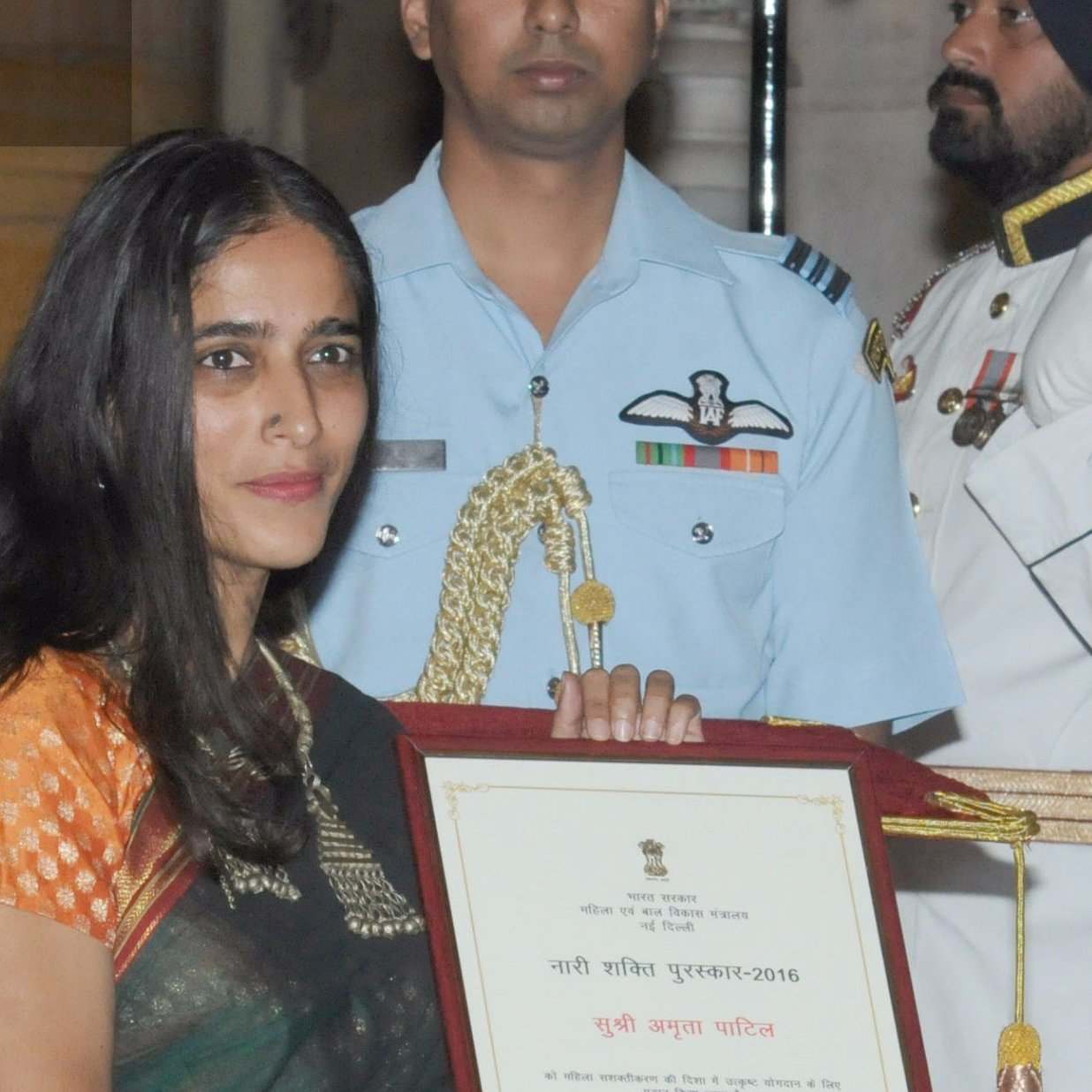
Amruta Patil with Nari Shakti Puraskar

Her work has been translated into French and Italian.

In 2009, Patil became the first Indian artist-in-residence at Maison des Auteurs in Angoulême, France, where she lived and worked for nearly a decade, participating in the city’s comics and visual arts community.

Her fourth graphic novel - Aranyaka - came about after conversations with her friend, the mythologist Devdutt Pattanaik. Aranyaka was first published by Westland in 2019, and then by HarperCollins India in 2023.

After a decade-long association with "comic book capital" Angoulême (France) and La Maison des Auteurs, a juried residency for comic book auteurs, Patil relocated to India in 2019.

She is one of the co-founder of Qomix, the world’s first non-fiction comics app.

Patil is curating an exhibition called 'A Moving Line' about Indian Visual Storytelling Traditions with Institut français (Delhi), Museum of Art and Photography (MAP) Bangalore, and La Cité internationale de la bande dessinée et de l'image (Angoulême, France).

== Painting ==
Patil’s visual practice includes large-scale paintings and mixed media works. Her first solo exhibition, Altar was presented at the Serendipity Arts Festival in Goa in December 2019. During the COVID-19 lockdowns, she focused extensively on painting, which she has described as an important phase in the development of her artistic practice.

She collaborated with Sufi scholar and lineage holder of the Inayatiyya tradition, Pir Zia Inayat Khan, on a legendarium about prophets from various world cultures. 'Tears From the Mother of the Sun', featuring 40 paintings by Patil and text by Khan, was released in January 2026.

== Public engagements ==
Amruta Patil was a speaker at the Zee Jaipur Literature Festival in 2017.

In 2018, she was a speaker and artist in residence at the School of Divinity, University of Chicago.

== Bibliography ==
- Kari (2008)
- Adi Parva: Churning of the Ocean (2012)
- Sauptik: Blood and Flowers (2016)
- Aranyaka (2019)

== Awards ==
Amruta Patil was awarded the Ministry of Women and Child Development's Nari Shakti Puraskar in March 2017 at the hands of the 13th President of India, Pranab Mukherjee.
