= Govindraj Ethiraj =

Indian journalist

- Occupation: Founder - Ping Digital

Govindraj Ethiraj is a journalist and entrepreneur. He started India's first data journalism initiative, IndiaSpend. He also co-founded two other media organisations, FactChecker and BOOM.

He is the co-founder of Ping Digital Broadcast, an online multi-channel network. He also founded BOOM, a general purpose news and fact-checking channel in January 2015. He was founder editor for the television channel, Bloomberg UTV. He stepped down as editor-in-chief to volunteer with UIDAI.

== Early life ==
He studied at the Elphinstone College, University of Mumbai.

== Career ==
Ethiraj worked as a journalist with the Economic Times and Business Standard before working with CNBC TV18. He later joined Bloomberg UTV as its Editor in Chief. He quit Bloomberg UTV in September 2010 to join the UIDAI's Aadhar project.

In 2011, he co-founded the Spending and Policy Research Foundation. This trust runs IndiaSpend. In 2014, he founded an extension of the website called FactChecker. In the same year, he co-founded two for-profit companies, Ping Digital Broadcast and BOOM.

He is a Kamalnayan Bajaj Fellow at The Aspen Institute, Colorado. He received the BMW Foundation Responsible Leaders Award in 2014 for his work with IndiaSpend.
