= Mitra Phukan =

Indian author

- Occupation: Novelist
- Writing career
- Period: 1986–present
- Genres: Fiction, translation, essays.
- Notable work: The Collector's Wife

Mitra Phukan is an Indian author who writes in English. She is also a translator, columnist, and trained classical vocalist. She currently lives in Guwahati, Assam.

== Biography ==
Her published literary works include four children's books, two biographies, including one on Bharat Ratna Dr Bhupen Hazarika, , three novels, "The Collector's Wife" "A Monsoon of Music" (Penguin-Zubaan), and "What Will People Say?" (Speaking Tiger), several volumes of translations of other novels, and a collection of fifty of her columns, "Guwahati Gaze". " A Full Night's Thievery"(Speaking Tiger) is a collection of her own short stories . Her recent works include a biography on Bhupen Hazarika (Sahitya Akademi). and the translation of twelve short stories by Arupa Patangia Kalita "The Owl, the River and the Valley" (Penguin Random House)

She writes extensively on Indian music as a reviewer and essayist. Her works have been translated into many languages, and several of them are taught in colleges and universities. As a translator herself, she has translated into English the works of some of the best-known Assamese writers of fiction, including "Blossoms in the Graveyard", a translation of Jyanpeeth Awardee Birendra Kumar Bhattacharjee's "Kobor Aru Phool," and "Guilt and Other Stories", a translation of Sahitya Akademi awardee Harekrishna Deka's stories.

Among her works is the volume "The Greatest Assamese Stories Ever Told", twenty-five stories in translation selected and edited by her, and "A Full Night's Thievery", a collection of her own short stories. She writes a column "All Things Considered" in the Assam Tribune.

She is the author of The Collector's Wife (2005), a novel set against the Assam Agitation of the 1970s and 80s. The Collector's Wife was one of the first generation novels in English written by an Assamese writer to be published by an international house.

Phukan is also a trained classical vocalist and writes regularly on music. Among her awards are the Katha Award for Translation, the CBT_UNICEF award for children's books, etc. Her translation "The Owl The River and The Valley" was shortlisted for the Crossword Award for Translatioin.

== Works ==
- Mamoni's Adventures (1986, Children's Book Trust)
- Chumki Posts a Letter (1989, Children's Book Trust)
- The Biratpur Adventure (1994, Children's Book Trust)
- R G Baruah The Architect of Modern Assam (2004, Sahitya Prakash)
- The Collector's Wife (2005, Zubaan/Penguin)
- Terrorist Camp Adventure (2003, Scholastic)
- A Monsoon of Music (2011, Zubaan/Penguin)
- Guwahati Gaze (2013, Bhabani Publishers)
- Blossoms in the Graveyard (2016, novel by Birendra Kumar Bhattacharya, translated by Mitra Phukan, Niyogi Publishers)
- A Full Night's Thievery (2016, Speaking Tiger)
- Aghoni Bai And Other Stories (2019, EBH Publishers translation of stories by Birinchi Kumar Baruah)
- Patmugi and Other Stories (2021, Assam Sahitya Sabha, with Gayatri Bhattacharjee translation of stories by Lakhminath Bezbaroa)
- Guilt and Other Stories (2021, stories by Harekrishna Deka, translated by Mitra Phukan, pub by Speaking Tiger)
- The Greatest Assamese Stories Ever Told (2021, Aleph. Selected and Edited by Mitra Phukan)
- "What Will People Say?" (2023, Speaking Tiger)
- "Bhupen Hazarika." (2023, Sahitya Akademi)
- "Kahini: A Story of our Times. (By Dhrubajyoti Borah, translated by Mitra Phukan) (2024, Om Books International)
- "The Owl, The River and the Valley" (Collection of 12 stories by Arupa Patangia Kalita, translated by Mitra Phukan) (Penguin Random House, 2025)

== See also ==
- Literature from North East India
- Indian English Literature
