= Mamang Dai =

Indian poet, novelist and journalist (born 1957)

Padma Shri Mamang Dai
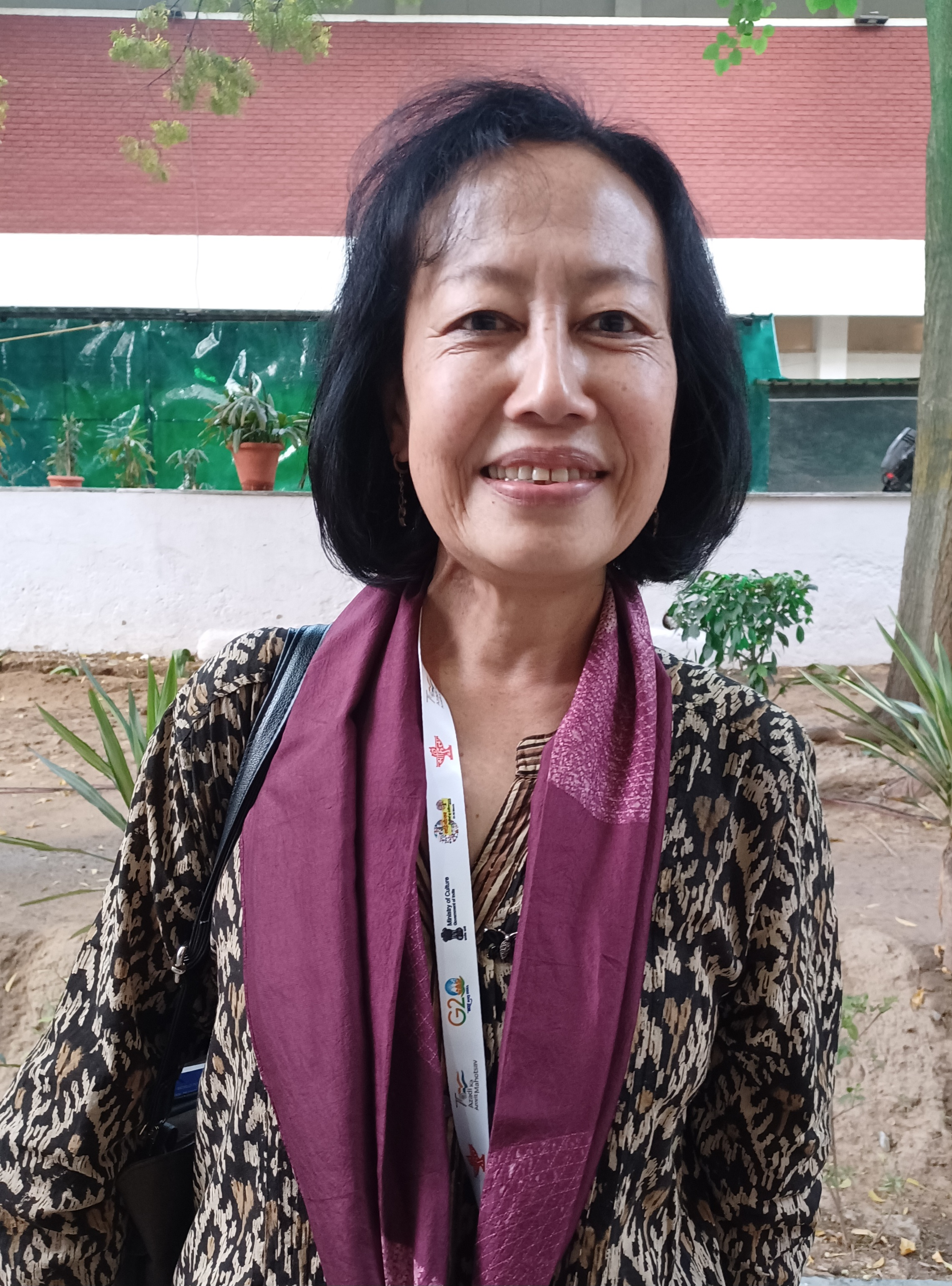
- Mamang Dai at Sahitya Akademi, New Delhi; March 2023
- Born: 23 February 1957 (age 69); Pasighat, East Siang district, North-East Frontier Agency, India
- Occupations: Poet, Novelist, Journalist
- Writing career
- Language: Adi; English
- Notable works: The Sky Queen; Stupid Cupid; Mountain Harvest: The Food of Arunachal Pradesh; River Poems
- Notable awards: Padma Shri (2011); Sahitya Akademi Award (2017)

Mamang Dai (born 23 February 1957) is a poet, novelist and journalist based in Itanagar, the capital of Arunachal Pradesh, India. She received Sahitya Akademi Award in 2017 for her novel The Black Hill.

== Early life and education ==
Mamang Dai was born on 23 February 1957 at Pasighat, East Siang district, to Matin Dai and Odi Dai. Her family belongs to the Adi tribe. She completed her schooling from Pine Mount School, Shillong, Meghalaya. She completed her Bachelor in English literature from Gauhati University, Assam.

== Career ==
She was selected for the IAS in 1979, but later she left the post to pursue her career in journalism. She is the first woman from her state to be selected for IAS. While working as a journalist, she contributed to The Telegraph (Calcutta), Hindustan Times and The Sentinel (newspaper) She has also worked in radio, as well as TV-AIR and DDK, Itanagar where she worked as an anchor and conducted interviews.

She was appointed programme officer at Worldwide Fund for Nature, known as WWF, where she worked in the Eastern Himalayas Biodiversity Hotspots programme. She was the former secretary of Itanagar Press Club. She was the president of Arunachal Pradesh Union of Working Journalists (APUW). In 2011, she was appointed a member of Arunachal Pradesh state public service commission.

== Works ==
Her non-fictional works include Arunachal Pradesh: The Hidden Land (2003) and Mountain Harvest : The Food of Arunachal (2004). The Sky Queen and Once Upon a Moontime (2003) are illustrated folklore texts by her. She published her first work of fiction, The Legends of Pensam in 2006, which is a set of interconnected stories of members of the Adi tribe. This was followed by Stupid Cupid (2008), The Black Hill (2014) and Escaping the Land (2021). River Poems (2004), The Balm of Time (2008) Hambreelmai's Loom (2014), and Midsummer Survival Lyrics (2014) are her poetry collections. The Balm of Time was also published in Assamese as El Balsamo Del YTiempo.

When she began writing, she wrote romantic verse and stories. She then moved from the theme of the self to focus on a larger reality. She reflects upon the sense of a close knit community living in remoter towns and villages.

Some of the positions that she has occupied include General Secretary of the Arunachal Pradesh Literary Society, member of the North East Writers’ Forum and General Council member of the Sahitya and Sangeet Natak Akademi.

== Awards ==
She received Padma Shri in 2011 from the Government of India. The government of Arunachal Pradesh conferred on her annual Verrier Elwin Prize in 2013 for her book Arunachal Pradesh: The Hidden Land. She received Sahitya Akademi Award in 2017 for her novel The Black Hill.

== See also ==
- Indian English Literature
- Literature from North East India
