= Prashant Jha =

Indian doctor and academician

- Born: 19 May 1981 (age 45); Delhi, India
- Education: Stanford University; Indian Institute of Technology Kanpur; Royal College of General Practitioners; Patna Medical College; All India Institute of Medical Sciences; Harvard University
- Occupations: Physician, engineer, entrepreneur, editor, inventor, academic
- Website: https://www.drpjha.com

Prashant Jha is an Indian-born physician, engineer and author. He is also working as consulting professor at All India Institute of Medical Sciences, New Delhi and IIT Delhi.

== Biosketch ==
Jha was born in Delhi, in 1981. He graduated in medicine (MBBS) and studied Family medicine for his post-graduation. He later pursued a doctoral fellowship in Intensive care medicine. After working for a decade as a general practitioner and Intensivist, he studied Biomedical Engineering and Computer Science at IIT Kanpur. He received his post-doctoral training in medical device innovations from the Stanford University. He then attended an executive program in Medical Device Design at Harvard University. Currently, he is a consulting Professor and Fellowship Director at the School of International Biodesign, a Department of Biotechnology funded program at the All India Institute of Medical Sciences, New Delhi (AIIMS) and Indian Institute of Technology, Delhi (IIT Delhi).

== School of International Biodesign ==
Jha co-founded the School of International Biodesign at the All India Institute of Medical Sciences Delhi and Indian Institute of Technology Delhi and served as its Fellowship Director till December 2018. The school is modelled on Stanford University's Biodesign program and trains innovators of medical technology through post-graduate innovation fellowships and also through workshops and events. The school is housed in Old OT Block of AIIMS, New Delhi and has Stanford University, Hiroshima University, Queensland University, and Indian Institute of Technology, New Delhi as partners. It is funded by the Department of Biotechnology, a unit of Ministry of Science and Technology, Government of India. The program has yielded thirty two patents on low cost medical devices.

== Courses and workshops ==
Jha teaches courses focused around frugal medical technology development at Aalto University, in the EBN Innovation Network, University College London, Queensland University of Technology (QUT), Hiroshima University, and Indian Institute of Technology Delhi.

He is a member of the faculty of Computer Science at Indraprastha Institute of Information Technology, Delhi (IIIT Delhi) where he teaches a course on Digital Health (BIO5xx).

Jha is a member of the faculty of Humanities and Social Sciences at IIT Patna and teaches a course titled "Innovations for Change" (HS451) in the autumn semester. This course leverages technologies to solve challenges for the underprivileged in the state of Bihar.

== Medical editor and author ==
Jha is the co-founder of world's first medical innovations journal, BMJ Innovations and serves as its Founder Editor. BMJ Innovations is a peer-reviewed online journal that publishes basic, clinical, translational, and epidemiological studies of all aspects of medical innovations. The journal champions research that offers new, cost-effective medical devices, technologies, processes and systems that improve patient care. It aims to promote innovations that make healthcare accessible and affordable, creating a community that aspires to make the world a healthier place.

Jha is the senior editor in South Asia for the BMJ where he edits and curates BMJ South Asia awards, news, views and analysis.

Between 1999 and 2011, Jha co-authored a series of handbooks for various medical specialties. They were popularly known as the SARP series. Some of the titles that became bestsellers were BAP (Biochemistry-Anatomy-Physiology), SARP (Skin, Anaesthesia, Radiology, and Psychiatry), Tumours, Surgery and PSM (Preventive and Social Medicine). In 2013, the entire content was acquired by CBS Publishers who have now revived the series with new set of editors.

== Social commitment ==
Jha works for a number of charities, the most prominent of them being Ramakrishna Mission and Vivekananda Samiti.
