= Rashmi Narzary =

Indian writer

Rashmi Narzary is an Indian Bodo writer hailing from the Indian state of Assam. She is best known for her children's book His Share of Sky (2012), for which she won the Sahitya Akademi Award in 2016.
