= Dona Paula =

Neighborhood in Goa, India

- Neighborhood
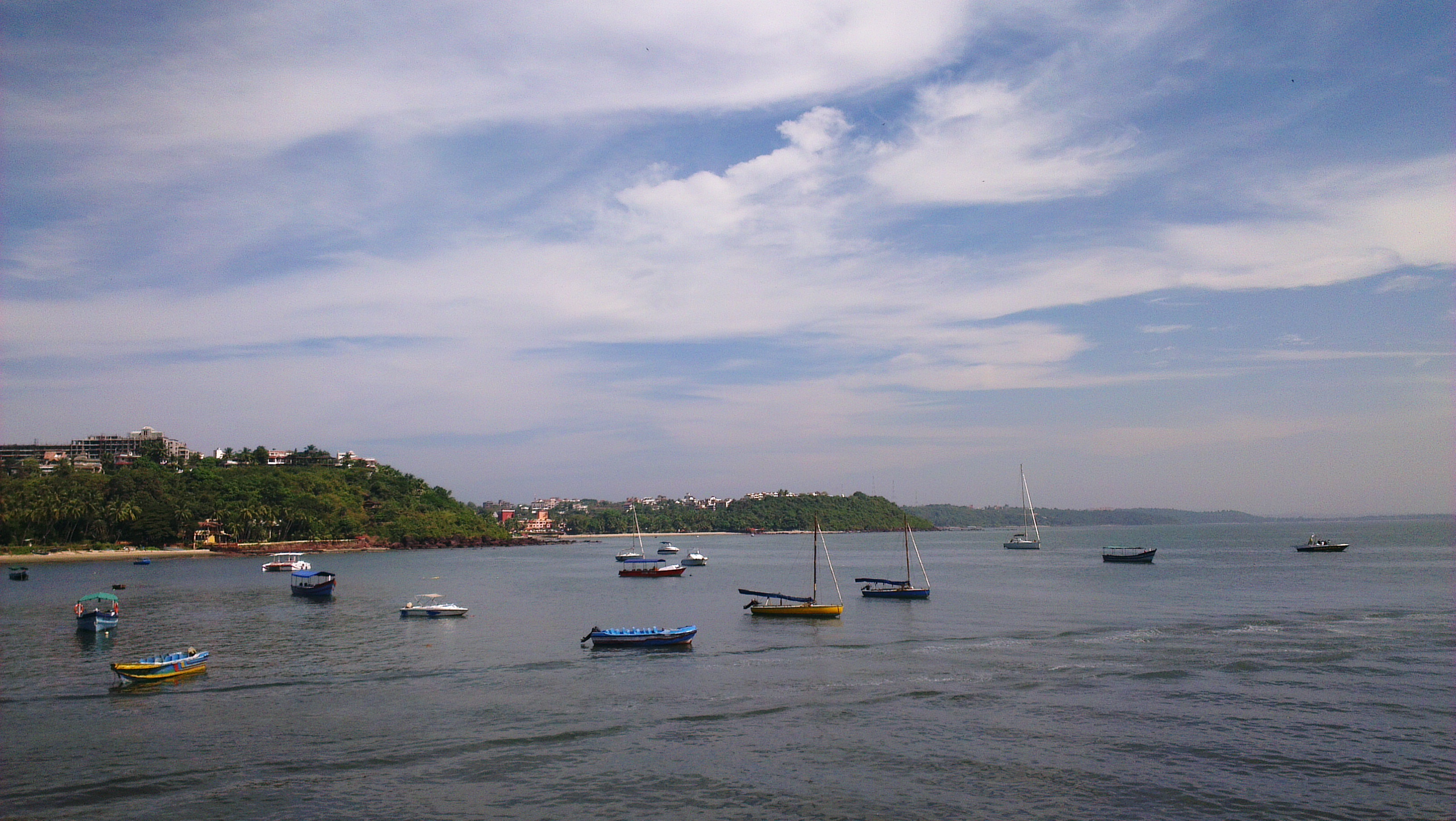
- Fishing Boats anchored at Dona Paula, Goa

- Location within Goa Location within India
- Coordinates: 15°27′2″N 73°48′12″E

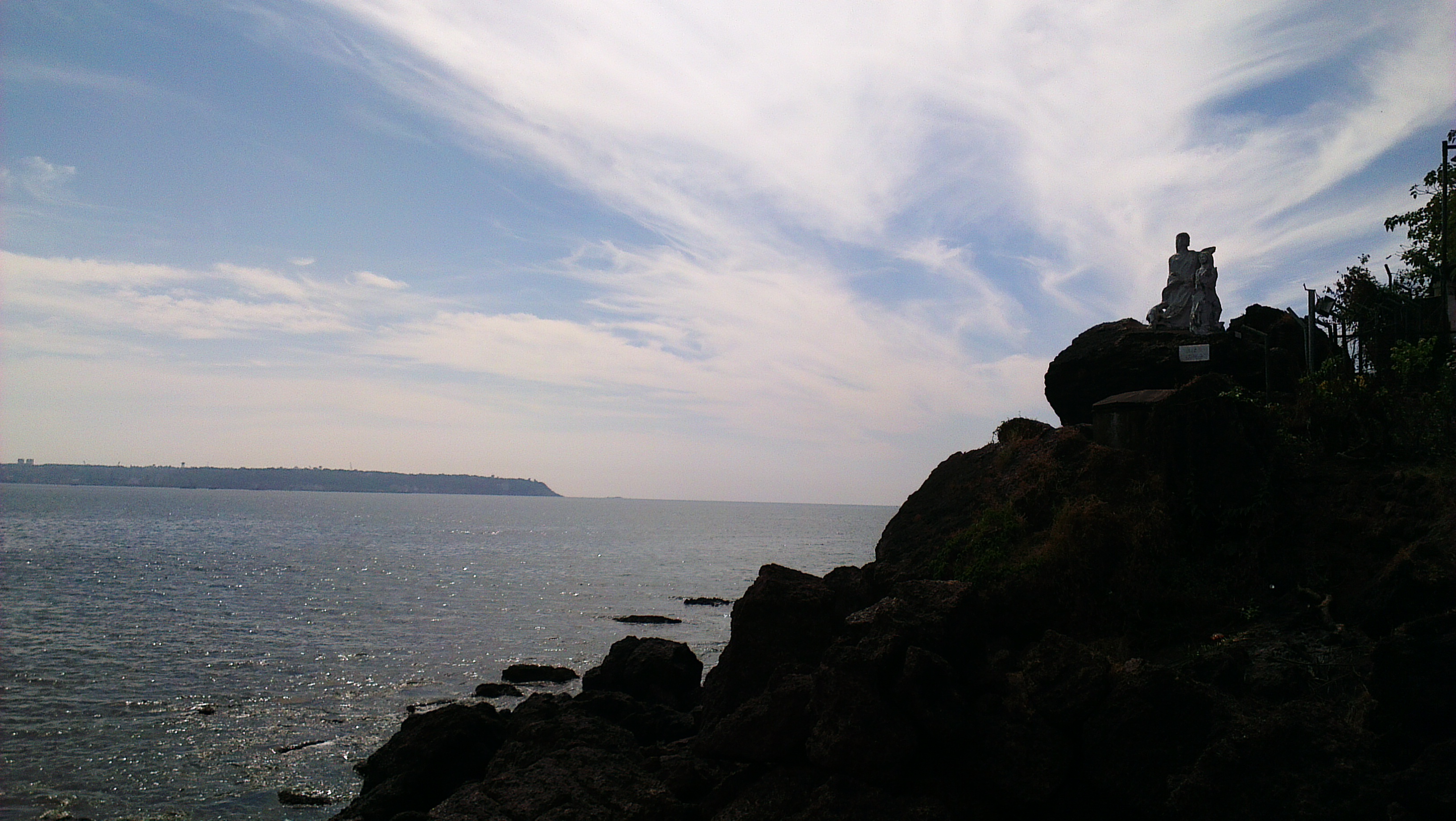
View of the rocks by the sea at Dona Paula, Goa

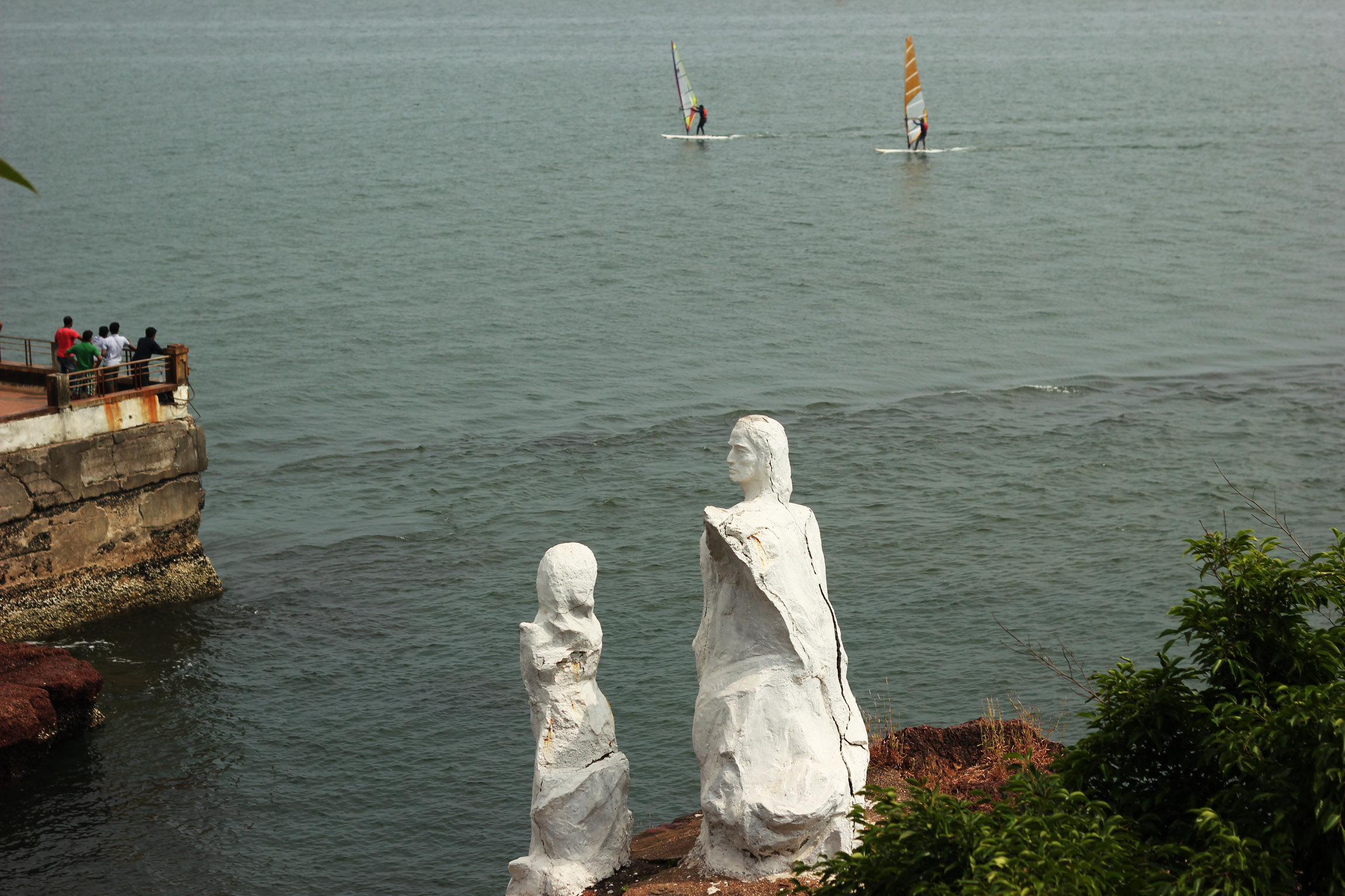
Sculptures of Robert Knox with his wife, made by Yrsa von Leistner in the 20th century

Dona Paula (Named after Dona Paula de Souto Maior) is a neighborhood and tourist destination in the city of Panaji, Goa, India. It is today home to the National Institute of Oceanography and the International Centre Goa.

== History ==
The place is named after Dona Paula Amaral Antónia de Souto Maior, a historical figure in Portuguese Goa. She was related to the Portuguese Viceroy of Jaffnapatnam in Sri Lanka. She and her family arrived in Goa in 1744 and she married a hidalgo from Spain in 1756. Her father was Dom António Caetano de Menezes Souto Maior. They were an extremely affluent family, and the entire property from the present-day Cabo Raj Nivas all the way to Caranzalem belonged to the Souto Maior family. She died on 21 December 1782.

Dona Paula was a woman of charity, and is known to have helped the villagers and worked a lot for their betterment. Hence after her death, the villagers decided to rename the neighborhood as Dona Paula. Initially, the neighborhood was called Oddavell.

The Palacio do Cabo (present day Goa Raj Bhavan) is situated at a scenic spot in Dona Paula. The area is also the location of a historic British war-graves cemetery.

== Tourism ==
Dona Paula is located on the sea stretch that spans from Panjim, Miramar and Dona Paula is an area frequented by tourists. During the tourist season, Dona Paula transforms into a crowded stretch which is otherwise a calm place during monsoons. A large part of the Hindi movie Ek Duuje Ke Liye was shot here, popularising the place further. An action sequence from Rohit Shetty's movie Singham was shot here. The idyllic rocky tourist attraction lies at the spot where the Mandovi and the Zuari rivers meet and flow into the Arabian Sea at a distance of 1 km from this point.

One of the attractions in Dona Paula is a whitewashed statue perched on the rocks near the ferry jetty. Sculpted in 1969 by Baroness Yrse Von Leistner, there are different versions of its purpose of origin. According to Goa Tourism Board's website, it is named "Image of India" and depicts the figures of Mother India and Young India, one looking to the East and the other to the West. The Wheel of Ashoka is in the middle half, buried in stone, to represent the ancient culture, that nurtured this blend of ideas and emotions. While in the book 'Walking in Goa published by Heta Pandit, it is said that the Baroness had actually sculpted statues of philosopher Robert Knox and his wife because she admired him.
