= Goan literature =

Goan literature is the literature pertaining to the state of Goa, India.

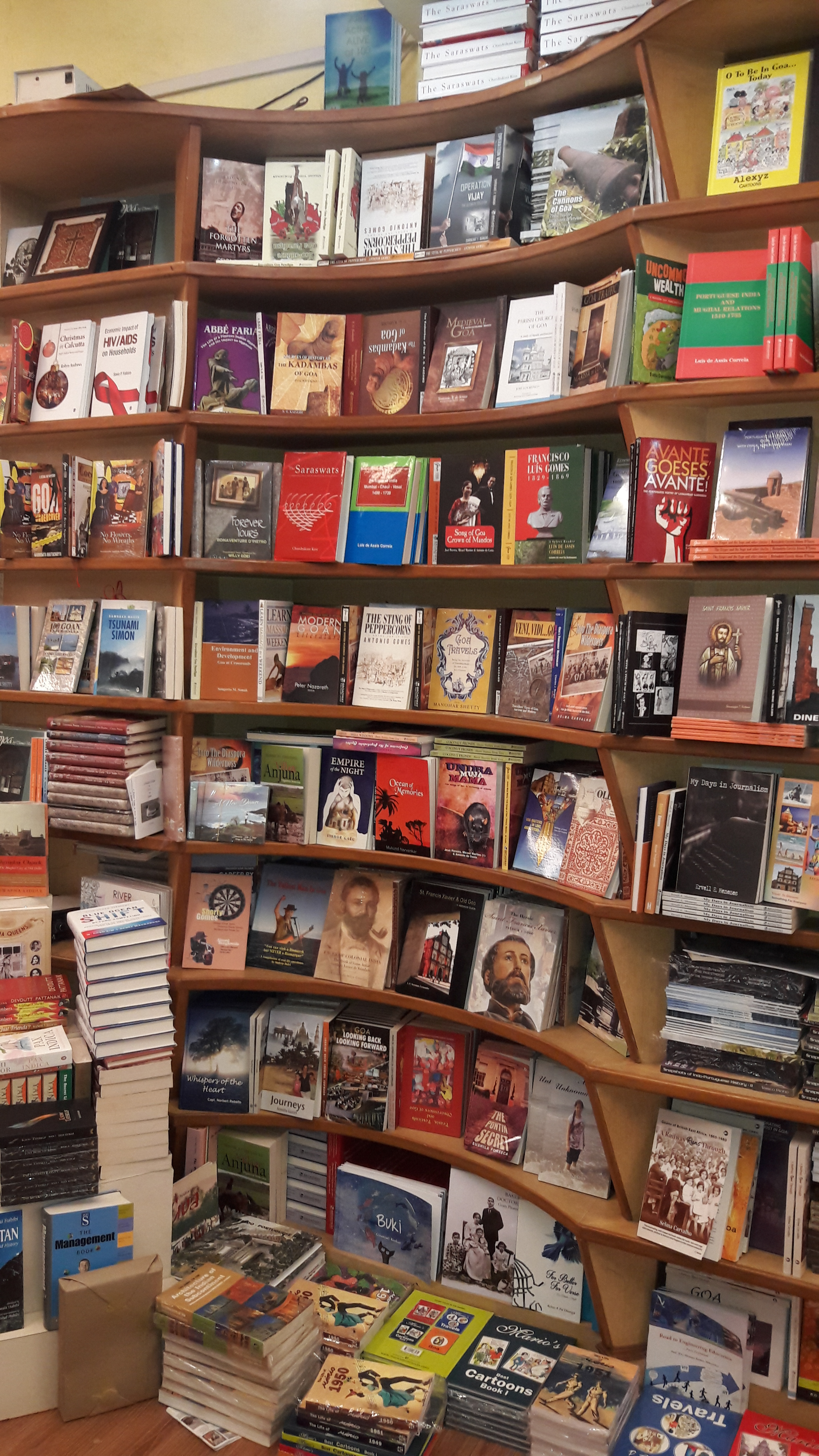
Goan Literature

Goa has a population of around 1.4 million and an area of 3,700 sq. kilometres (1,430 sq. miles). For a small region, it has a significant amount of publication activity, possibly in part because its people write in a number of languages—perhaps as many as 13—and also because of the large expatriate and diaspora population of Goans settled across the globe.

Among its most noted writers are Laxmanrao Sardessai (1904–1986) and R. V. Pandit (1917–1990), both of whom wrote poetry and prose in Marathi, Konkani, and Portuguese; Shenoi Goembab (1877–1946), whose Konkani writing helped to establish Konkani as a modern literary language; Ravindra Kelekar (1925–2010), who wrote some of the twentieth century's foremost Konkani literature; and Pundalik Naik (born 1952), whose 1977 novel Acchev was the first Konkani novel to be translated into English.

== History ==
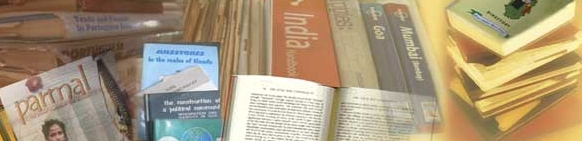
Books from Goa.

Goa was the first place in Asia to have a printing press, which was brought by the Jesuits in 1556. Nearly all of Goan literature before that time is known to have been destroyed by the Portuguese during the imposition of Inquisition. Goa's Portuguese colonial rulers can hardly be credited with meticulous record-keeping of Goan literature. Thus, Goa has had a long love affair with the written and printed word, although growth has been slow, and punctuated by problems like linguistic breaks and censorship.

In 1886, Tipografia Rangel, one of the pioneers in widescale publishing was founded. Prior to this the only existing presses were those of the government and individual family presses existing to print the political newspapers. Tipografia Rangel was among the leaders in providing print media and promoting literature to a larger section of society in Goa.

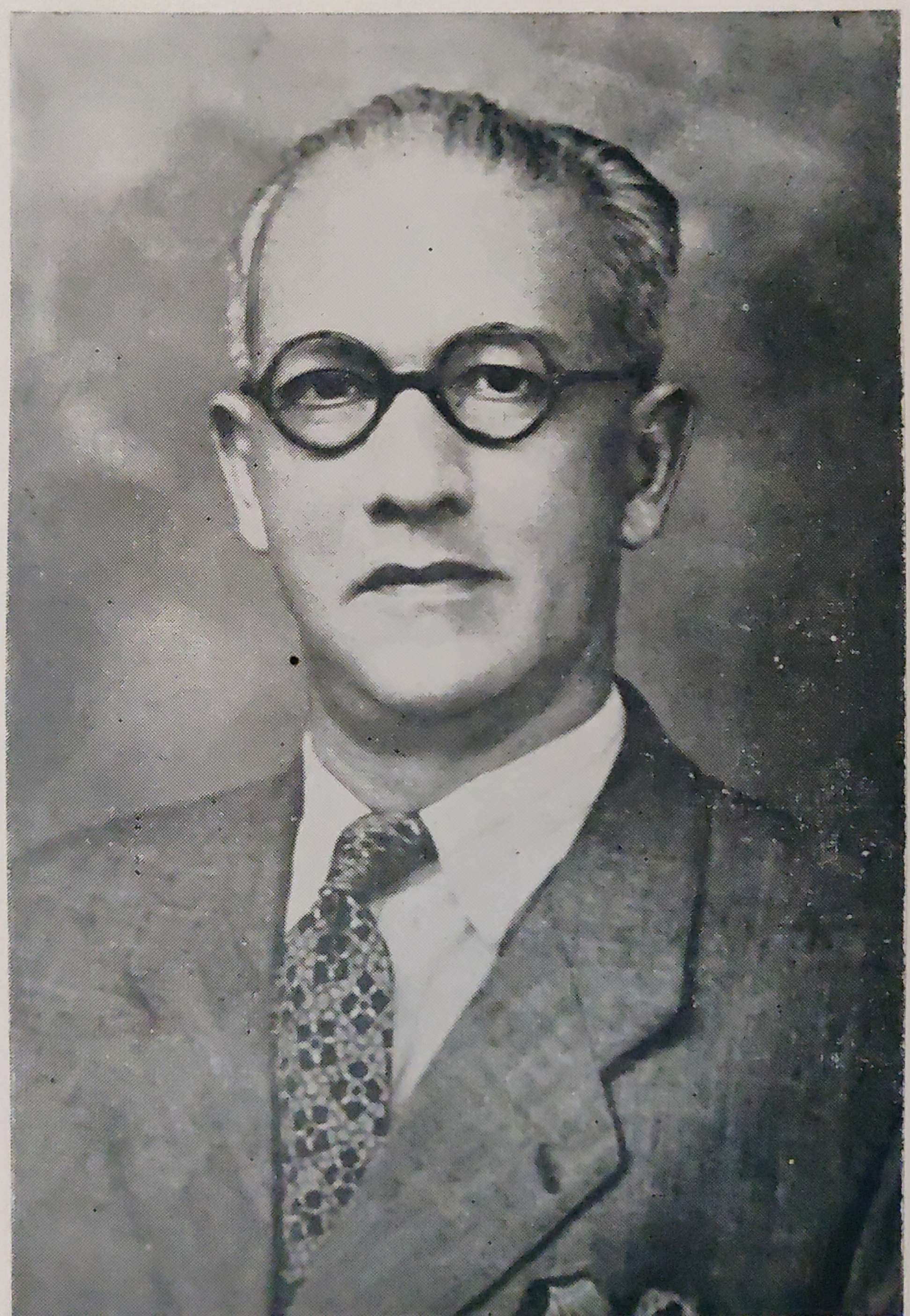
Jaime Valfredo Rangel, Director of Tipografia Rangel

Peter Nazareth points out that Goans have written in thirteen languages, of which the chief are Konkani, Marathi, English and Portuguese. Nazareth describes Goans as 'cultural brokers':

Goans mediate between cultures, Goans live between different cultures, Goans are travellers from one part of the world to another. This, in my opinion, happened when East and West met in Goans under pressure with the Portuguese conquest. Since that time, our usefulness to the world, wherever we are, is that we can understand different cultures and help people from different cultures understand one another. The disadvantage is that if we don't work on it, we may end up not knowing who we are.

Literary writing in Goa began to take shape under Portuguese rule and influence, associated with Portugal's mid-nineteenth-century Regeneration, which saw the reintroduction of the press to Goa, along with expanded Portuguese education. A spate of Portuguese-language publications, 'such as A Biblioteca de Goa (1839), O Enciclopédico (1841–1842), O Compilador (1843–1847), O Gabinete Literário das Fontainhas (1846–1848), A revista Ilustrativa (1857–1866) and O Arquivo Portugués Oriental (1857–1866)', along with Júlio Gonçalves's Ilustraçao Goana (1864–1866), while often short-lived, provided new fora not only for the circulation of European literature (whether originally in Portuguese or in translation), but provided growing opportunities for Goans to publish literary and scholarly writing.

The first novel published by a Goan was Os Brahmanes (The Brahmans) by Francisco Luis Gomes, published in 1866.

Later in the nineteenth century, vernacular writing began to emerge in strength, for example in Konkani, the widely spoken local vernacular. The Goan writer Shenoi Goembab (1877–1946) was foundational to developing modern Konkani literature. An official language of the region since 1987, Konkani is now studied in schools. Konkani literature emerged alongside the rapid growth of Marathi literature, in which the Goan R. V. Pandit was a notable exponent. S. M. Tadkodkar, who was conferred PhD degree by Goa University for his exhaustive research work on Anant Kaakaba Priolkar, contends that while the Kannadd language of Karnataka province was dominating the Goan culture, Marathi language and culture was embraced by Goans. Now, Marathi has embraced the Goans and would not leave them, willingly. Maximum literature is published in Marathi. There are 8 Marathi dailies published from Goa. Prominent among them are Dianik Gomantak, Tarun Bharat, Lokamat, Navaprabha, Pudhari, Goadoot. The Marathi daily Lokmat has the highest circulation (50000+) among all dailies.

In the late nineteenth century, extensive contacts with and migration to British-ruled India also encouraged English-language Goan writing, with early exponents including Joseph Furtado. Edward D'Lima, who has done his PhD on the Goan writer Armando Menezes, argues that Goan writing in English goes back to the late nineteenth century, when Goans were migrating out of this Portuguese-controlled colony in favour of jobs in the growing English-speaking British-ruled colonial world. English is probably the most influential literary language in Goa: 'a surge of creativity has erupted in Goan literature in English since 2000 in fiction and nonfiction, drama and poetry'.

== Goan writers ==
Besides English, Konkani and Marathi, Goans, particularly those of the past generation, have contributed significantly to writings in Portuguese.

Name	Dates	Principal language(s)	Principal forms	Notes
Ben Antao	1935-	English	fiction and non-fiction	
Walfrido Antão	1950s-1980s	Portuguese	short stories	
Carmo Azavedo		Portuguese		Noted for From the Tip of the Pen (Ao Bico da Pena).
Alexandre Moniz Barbosa		English		
Silviano C. Barbosa		English	prose fiction	His novel The Sixth Night takes you from a typically legendary life in Portuguese Goa in the 1950s all the way to Toronto, Canada.
Adeodato Barreto	1905-37	Portuguese	poetry	
Floriano Barreto				
Uday Bhembré		Konkani	short stories, plays	
Alfredo Bragança		Portuguese	poetry	
Luís de Menezes Bragança	1878–1938	Portuguese	journalism	
José Rangel	1930–2004	Portuguese	Poetry	Also proprietor of one of Goa's most prolific printing press and publishing houses Tipografia Rangel.
Mário da Silva Coelho		Portuguese	poetry	
José da Silva Coelho	1889–1944	Portuguese	short stories	Goa's most prolific Portuguese-language fiction-writer.
Alvaro da Costa		Portuguese	journalism	
Suneeta Peres Da Costa	1976-	English	fiction	An Australian writer of Goan ancestry, noted for her novel Homework.
Amadeo Prazeres da Costa		Portuguese	journalism	
Francisco João "GIP" da Costa	1859–1900	Portuguese	short stories	
Orlando da Costa	1929–2006	Portuguese	poetry and novels	
Maria Aurora Couto		English	prose fiction and criticism	
Joao da Veiga Coutinho	1918–2015	English		Noted for A Kind of Absence: Life in the Shadows of History.
Nandita da Cunha		English	prose fiction	
Ananta Rau Sar Dessai	1910	Portuguese, Marathi	poetry and radio theatre	Goa's pre-eminent Portuguese writer in the mid-twentieth century.
Vimala Devi (pseudonym of Teresa de Almeida)	1932-	Portuguese, Catalan, Esperanto		Pre-eminent literary critic of Lusophone Goan writing and a leading writer.
Paulino Dias	1874–1919			
Jessica Faleiro		English	fiction	
Sonia Faleiro	1977-	English		
Agostinho Fernandes	1932–2015	Portuguese	novels	Author of a key post-independence novel, Bodki (1962).
Caridade Damaciano Fernandes	1904–1948	Konkani	novels	A pioneering prose fiction writer in Konkani.
Joseph Furtado	1872–1947	English, Portuguese	poetry	
Shenoi Goembab	1877–1946	Konkani	prose fiction, translations	
António (J. Anthony) Gomes		English	prose fiction and poetry	New York-based writer of poetry: Visions from Grymes Hill and a much acclaimed novel, The Sting of Peppercorns, published by Goa 1556, Mirrored Reflection (a collection of poems) published by Goa 1556 & Fundacao Oriente, 2013.
Francisco Luis Gomes	1829–1869	Portuguese		The first Goan novelist.
Olivinho Gomes	1943–2009	Konkani, Portuguese, English	poetry, translations and criticism	
Júlio Gonçalves	1846–1896	Portuguese	short stories	
Mariano Gracias				
Ravindra Kelekar	1925–2010	Konkani	prose fiction	
Amita Kanekar	1965-	English	novels	
Violet Dias Lannoy	1925–1973	English	novel, short stories	
Lino Leitão	1930–2008	English	short stories	based in North America
Fanchu Loyola	1891–1973	Portuguese	journalism	One of Goa's leading independence activists.
Lambert Mascarenhas	1914–2021	English		
Margaret Mascarenhas		English	literary fiction, poetry, essay	
Telo Mascarenhas	1899–1979	Portuguese	journalism, poetry, prose fiction	
Damodar Mauzo	1944-	Konkani	fiction	
Nascimento Mendonça	1884–1927	Portuguese		Through the Mythical Ayodhya.
Armando Menezes	1902–1983			
Dom Morães	1938–2004	English	poetry, belles-lettres	
Pundalik Naik	1952-	Konkani	novels and plays	Wrote the first Konkani novel to be translated into English.
Peter Nazareth	1940-	English	fiction	A Goan writer from Uganda, noted for the novel The General Is Up along with literary criticism.
Alberto de Noronha	1920–2006	Portuguese	translations, criticism	
Carmo Noronha		Portuguese		Works include Contracorrente (Panjim, Goa: 1991) and Escalvando na Belga (Panjim. Goa: 1993).
Frederick Noronha	1963	English	journalism	
Leslie de Noronha		English	prose fiction and poetry	
Epitácio Pais	1928–2009	Portuguese	short stories	
R. V. Pandit	1917–1990	Marathi, Konkani, Portuguese	poetry	Most celebrated for his vast poetic production in Konkani.
Prakash S. Pariekar		Portuguese		
Vasco Pinho	1942-			
Floriano Pinto		Portuguese	poetry	
Jerry Pinto	1966-	English	poetry	
Victor Rangel-Ribeiro	1925-	English	prose fiction	
Leopoldo da Rocha		Portuguese		Author of Casa Grande e Outras Recordações de um velho Goês (Lisbon: Vega, 2008).
Maria Elsa da Rocha	1924–2007	Portuguese	short stories, poetry	
Alberto de Meneses Rodrigues	1904–1971	Portuguese	prose fiction	
Augusto do Rosário Rodrigues	1910-?1999	Portuguese	short stories. poetry	
Manuel C. Rodrigues	1908 – 1991	English	fiction	
Abhay Sardesai			poetry, translation	
Manohar Sardesai		Portuguese	poetry	
Laxmanrao Sardessai	1904–1986	Marathi, Konkani, Portuguese	poetry	Considered one of Goa's finest Marathi writers.
Manohar Shetty	1953–	English	fiction	
Melanie Silgardo	1956-		poetry	
Frank Simoes	1937–2002	English	advertising and journalism	
Carmo D'Souza		English	prose fiction	Author of Angela's Goan Identity, Portugal In Search of Identity and other books. In a recent lecture, D'Souza himself traced the indigenous imagery, and the impact of Portuguese on Goan writing.
Eunice De Souza	1940–2017	English	poetry and fiction	Mumbai-based.
S. M. Tadkodkar		English, Konkani, Marathi	poetry, research, theory, academics	Author of Goan Christian Marathi Vilapika During The 17th Century (2010); Professor and Head, Department of Postgraduate Instruction and Research in Marathi, Goa University.
Savia Viegas	1957–	English	fiction	

== Resources for and about Goan writers ==
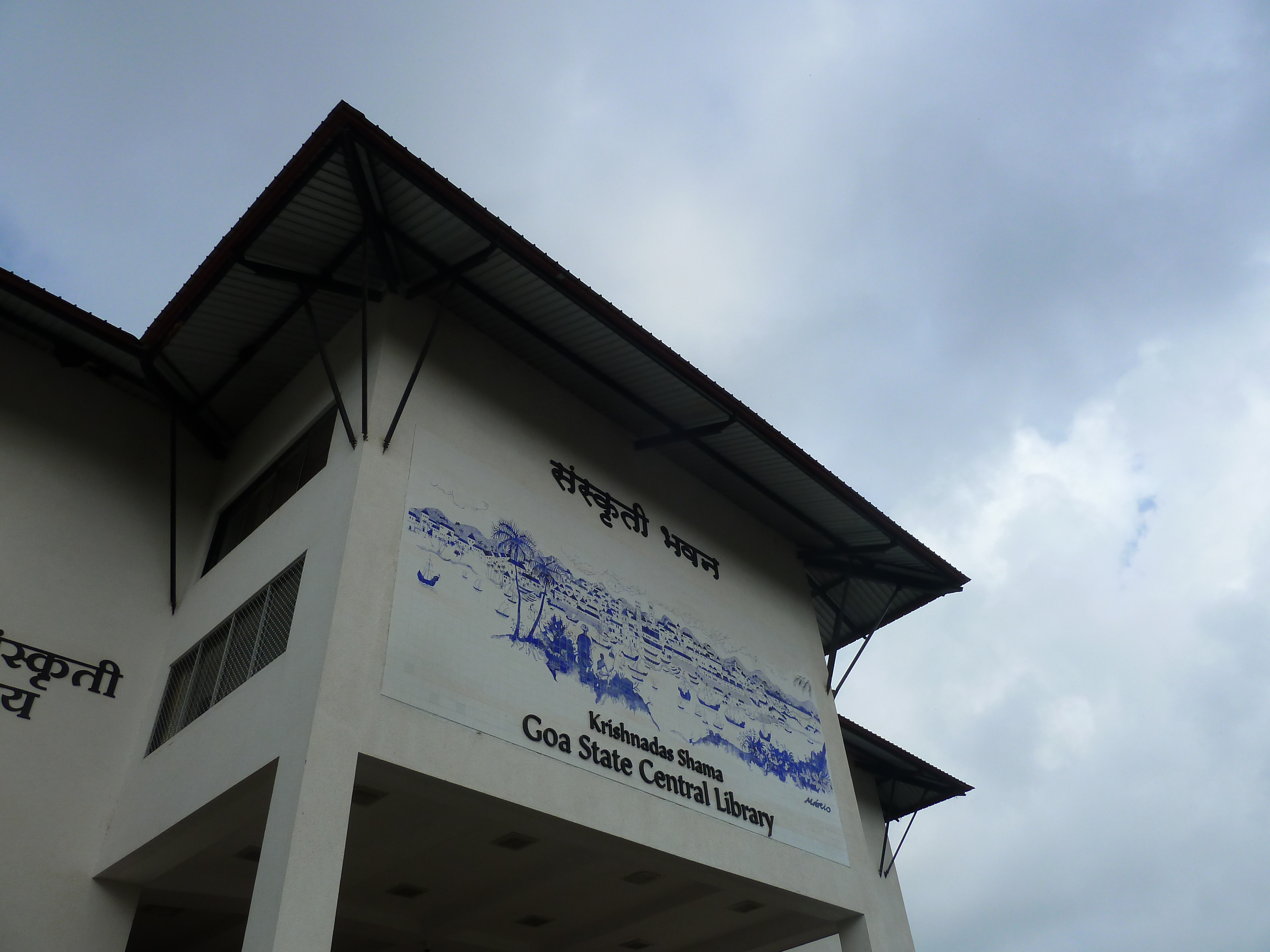
Central Library, Panjim (Panaji), Goa, India

- Goa University institutional repository, languages and literature section
- The Goa Archives
- Fundação Oriente, Panjim-based Portuguese cultural body, which has helped some writers with small grants of a few thousand rupees.
- Goa University Library: It has a large collections in the languages of Konkani, Marathi, English, Portuguese, French. It has old manuscripts, microfilms and prints of the 17th century in Goa.
- Goa State Central Library, which is run by the Government of Goa, is the oldest library in South Asia. It has been one of the largest depositories of printed volumes pertaining to Goan languages and literature since the seventeenth century.

== Goa Arts and Literary Festival ==
Goa Arts and Literary Festival (GALF) is a non- profit festival organised by volunteers. The first edition of GALF was held in 2010. The three-day fest had debates, lectures and discussions on art, music, photography, drawing a large audience from across the world at the International Centre of Goa, Dona Paula.

== Bibliography ==
- COSTA, Aleixo Manuel da. Dicionário de literatura goesa. Instituto Cultural de Macau, Fundação Oriente, 3 v., 1997.
- DEVI, Vimala, & SEABRA, Manuel de. A literatura indo-portuguesa. Junta de Investigações do Ultramar, 2 v., 1971.
- NAZARETH, Peter (ed.). "Goan Literature: A Modern Reader", Journal of South Asian Literature Winter-Spring 1983.

== Sources ==
"Goan Literature: A Modern Reader", Journal of South Asian Literature Winter-Spring 1983

Translated in Manohar Shetty's Ferry Crossing

== See also ==
- Konkani language
- Konkani words from other languages
