= Poets in (and from) Goa =

Goa is India's smallest state on the west coast, and its writers have written in many diverse languages. Poetry is a small and scattered field in the region, and this page makes an attempt to acknowledge those who have contributed to the field. It includes those listed below who have contributed to poetry in and from Goa, as well as those writing poetry in Goa. Poetry related to Goa (specially by those from the region) is known to have been written in Konkani (in the officially-acknowledged Devanagari and the popularly-used Roman scripts, apart from others), in Portuguese, English and Marathi, apart from other regional, national and international languages to a lesser extent.

== Some prominent names from the past ==
Father Thomas Stephens, an English Jesuit living in Goa, "wrote the first Konkani grammar book and an epic 11,000-line Marathi poem, now regarded as a classic."

Eunice de Souza, herself a prominent poet in English, writes: "Joseph Furtado, who wrote in English and in Portuguese was one of the first poets to use what we now call “Indian English.” “Fortune teller, memsahib!/Tell fortune very well…/” There’s the great modernist, F N Souza. And we are probably the only people in the world to write an ode to sorpotel! In addition, poets such as the late Santan Rodrigues, Melanie Silgardo, and Raul da Gama Rose played an important role in poetry in English in the 1970s. They started a poets’ cooperative named Newground and published some volumes of poetry. Melanie, who has been living in London for some years recently co-edited with me an anthology called These My Words, The Penguin Book of Indian Poetry which includes translations of poems in all Indian languages, and poems in English."

Augusto Pinto, reviewer, writes of Joseph "Furtado, who passed away in 1947 at the age of 75, was one of the finest Indian English poets of his time" in a detailed article in the Himal magazine, published from Kathmandu

== Comments on poetry in and from Goa ==
Peter Nazareth, the editor of the first anthology in English of Goan writing, comments: "I found some of the literature very strange, particularly poetry written before the fifties. The subjects seemed hopelessly romantic, the treatment archaic, the psyche concerned with the irrelevant. Was it just because I was out of touch? Or was it that being involved with the exciting, creative, literature of a whole continent, Africa, my responses were sound: that Goan writers were trapped in a deep, airless well?"

Goa Today, the monthly magazine from the region, has an article on Goan poets in English.

== Konkani (Nagari) ==
- Bakibab Borkar
- RV Pandit
- Uday Bhembre
- Veni Madhav Borkar
- Manoharrai Sardesai
- Nagesh Karmali
- Madhav Borkar, known for his terse, abstract but appealing verse.
- Ramesh Veluskar originality and picturing sensuous nature.
- Shankar Ramani, a melodious poet
- Pundalik Naik, unusual thoughts and vigour
- Shashikant Punaji
- John Aguiar
- Maya Kharangate

== Konkani (Roman script) ==
- Fr. Thomas Stephens (1549–1619) – A Jesuit priest who played a pivotal role in standardizing the Roman script for Konkani and authored Konkani Grammar and Arte da Lingoa Canarim.
- Fr. Vasco do Rego SJ, known for his flawless metre and rhyme and beauty of language.
- Walter Menezes
- Br. Eusebio Vicente Miranda – A member of the Pilar Fathers, active in the 20th century, contributing to Romi Konkani literature
- Jess Fernandes
- Pio Esteves – A writer, journalist, and poet known for his Romi Konkani works
- Fatima D'Souza

== Konkani (Kannada script) ==
- CPF (Chafra) D'Costa, wealth of images and ideas.
- Moridas (Anthony D'Souza)
- J B Morais

== English ==
- Joseph Furtado
- Dom Moraes
- Armando Menezes
- Leslie de Noronha
- Santan Rodrigues
- Manuel Rodrigues
- Eunice De Souza
- Innocent Sousa
- Antonio Gomes
- Jerry Pinto
- Manohar Shetty
- Tony Fernandes
- Margaret Mascarenhas
- António Mascarenhas
- Jose Rangel
- Frederika Menezes
- Rochelle Potkar
- Gerson da Cunha
- Sheena Cecilia Pereira
- Mark Rocha

== Marathi ==
- Vishnu Wagh
- Shankar Ramani

== Portuguese ==
- Nascimento Mendonça (1884–1927)
- Orlando da Costa
- Paulino Dias (1874–1919)
- Adeodato Barreto (1905-1937)
- Floriano Barreto (1877–1905)
- Prof. Laxmanrao Sardessai
- Ananta Rau Sar Dessai
- Judit Beatriz de Souza(1933–2011)
- Vimala Devi (1936)
- Jose Filipe Neri Soares Rebelo
- Telo Mascarenhas
- Oscar Monteiro
