= António Mascarenhas =

António Mascarenhas may refer to:

- António de Menezes (1891–1961), Portuguese Olympic fencer
- António Mascarenhas (governor), Governor of Portuguese Ceylon, 1638–1640
- António Mascarenhas (writer) (1916–1993), English-language writer from India
- António Mascarenhas Monteiro (1944–2016), President of Cape Verde, 1991–2001
- Anthony Mascarenhas (1928–1986), Pakistani journalist and author
