= José da Silva Coelho =

Goan writer and journalist (1889–1944)

- Born: 1889; Margão, Goa, Portuguese India
- Died: 1944 (aged 54–55)
- Occupations: Writer; journalist

José da Silva Coelho (1889 – 1944) was a Goan author of several dozen pieces of wickedly satirical short fiction in the 1920s and 1930s, published for the most part in the Portuguese-language newspaper O Heraldo. He is easily the most prolific Goan fictionist in Portuguese.

== Personal life ==
José da Silva Coelho was born in Margão in 1889, one of fifteen children (among them Mario da Silva Coelho, himself a prominent poet). After attending the lyceum in Pangim and pursuing private law studies he became a public notary, working at first as an assistant to his father (also a notary public), then on a posting to Damão, and then in Bicholim in the Novas Conquistas, where he worked for the rest of his life. He was a keen hunter (which took him all over the interior of Goa) and spoke fluent Konkani, and 'was apparently something of a dandy and an epicurean'. He never married.

== Career ==
Apart from being noteworthy for its quantity, Coelho's social satires are significant for their breadth, partly reflecting his close acquaintance with the culture of the Novas Conquistas, and reaching beyond the relatively narrow scope of his Goan forerunner Francisco João "GIP" da Costa to include people of a diverse range of castes, religions, and walks of life. 'The opprobrium heaped upon Silva Coelho for his efforts soon left him ... exhausted, unable to continue as a writer and soon to be forgotten'; his last published story seems to have been in 1931, roughly at the same time as the Estado Novo began.

=== Contos Regionais ===
Coelho published around 40 stories in the series Contos Regionais (or Regional Tales) between 1922 and 1927. It is these tales that led Vimala Devi and Manuel de Seabra to call him "one of the most notable Goan short-story writers". The two critics write that Coelho was able to depict his people with an authenticity that hurts even today. The stories show the influence of the Portuguese satiric realist Eça de Queiroz, one of Silva Coelho's favourite authors. The series was something of a succès de scandale in Goa, being enormously popular amongst the reading public whilst provoking outrage amongst individuals who recognised themselves in the author's characters. The series went on to inspire a host of local epigones, less talented imitators, in the local press. It also seems to have influenced a number of subsequent Goan writers: Ananta Rau Sar Dessai, Vimala Devi, and Augusto do Rosário Rodrigues.

=== Lendas Indianas ===
Coelho also collected a number of ('Lendas Indianas' or Indian Legends). Three dozen of these short pieces were published in a series of the same name in 'O Heraldo'.

=== Malicias Orientais ===
Coelho also wrote a series of stories about Hindu characters. These were never published in his lifetime.

== English-Language Translations ==
- The Hesitations of Damião and His First Love
- To Love is to Suffer
- Dr Pancrácio's Liver
- Everyone Eats or There'll be Trouble
- Paul Melo e Castro (trans.), Lengthening Shadows, 2 vols (Saligão: Goa, 1556, 2016), I pp. 97–120 (five stories: "A Bunch of Bananas for Advocate Separião", "The Monserrate Chap", "The Tardy Development of Sebastianinho's Ideas", "How My Short Stories Affect People's Sense of Proportions")
