= Colvale =

- census town
- Location in Goa, India Colvale (India)
- Coordinates: 15.62°N 73.83°E
- Country: India
- State: Goa
- District: North Goa
- Elevation: 9 m (30 ft)

Population (2001)
  - Total: 5,475

Languages
  - Official: Konkani
- Time zone: UTC+5:30 (IST)
- Vehicle registration: GA
- Website: goa.gov.in

Colvale is a census town in North Goa district in the state of Goa, India. It has been a scenic and historic village, though in recent years changed by out-migration and in-migration. It is the last border village on Bardez or Bardes (then the 'Old Conquest' boundary in Portuguese-ruled colonial Goa. On the edge of Colvale is the Chapora river, after which is the next taluka (sub-district), and Goa's northernmost, of Pernem.

== Demographics ==
As of 2001 India census, Colvale had a population of 5475. Males constitute 55% of the population and females 45%. Colvale has an average literacy rate of 72%, higher than the national average of 59.5%: male literacy is 74% and, female literacy is 69%. In Colvale, 10% of the population is under 6 years of age.

== Industrial estate ==
Currently, Colvale is home to a Government of Goa-run industrial estate. There are, as of 2021, some 25 units in production at the Colvale industrial estate.

== Notable people ==
- Antu Shenoy the forefather of Abbe Faria, Goan hypnotist
- Wendell Rodricks (1956-2020) Indian designer and author of Moda Goa, The Green Room and Poskem: Goans in the Shadows.
- Kalki Kochelin, actress
