= Wendell Rodricks =

Indian fashion designer and author (1960–2020)

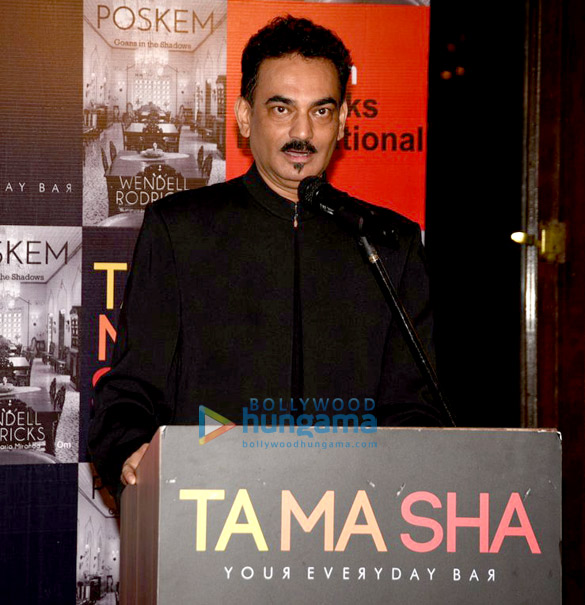
- Rodricks in 2017
- Born: 28 May 1960; Bombay, Bombay State, India
- Died: 12 February 2020 (aged 59); Colvale, Goa, India
- Occupations: Fashion designer; author
- Partner: Jerome Marrel (PACS in 2002)
- Awards: Padma Shri(2014); Chevalier de l'Ordre des Arts et Lettres (2015)
- Website: wendellrodricks.com

Wendell Rodricks (28 May 1960 – 12 February 2020) was an Indian fashion designer and author based in Colvale, Goa. He was also an activist for social causes, environment and gay rights. In 2014, the Government of India awarded him its fourth-highest civilian award, the Padma Shri.

== Early life ==
Wendell Rodricks was born on 28 May 1960 to Goan Catholic parents, Greta and Felix in Parel, Bombay. He was the eldest brother to Robin, Chester and Joel. The original surname of the family was "Rodrigues", but changed to "Rodricks" after a misspelling during his grandfather's time. He grew up in Mahim and attended St. Michael's High School in Mahim. After completing his school education, he completed a graduate diploma in catering. He then joined as an assistant director of the Royal Oman Police (ROP) Officers Club in Muscat in 1982. However, he did not pursue these professions but moved to fashion designing. He began by using his savings to study fashion in Los Angeles and Paris.

== Career ==
=== Fashion ===
Rodricks began his career in fashion by designing for Garden Vareli, Lakmé Cosmetics and DeBeers. When in Paris, with his first portfolio in hand, he was advised to put "your country in your clothes". He launched his own label in 1989, with his first show held at the Regal Room of the Oberoi Hotel, Mumbai. His first collection consisted of twelve ensembles, with model Mehr Jesia. Out of these, only six were complete outfits. He did not have enough funds for supplying all models with shoes or bottoms for their organza tunics. Following this, Rodricks' work involved a wide range of fashion, from lecturing on world costume history (at SNDT Women's University) to fashion journalism and styling for international advertising campaigns. He was the first Indian designer to be invited to IGEDO, the world's largest garment fair, in 1995; the first Indian designer to open the Dubai Fashion Week in 2001; and was invited to present at the Paris Fashion Week Pret a Porter salon in 2007. He was a fellow design member of the Fashion Design Council of India.

Rodricks was known for pioneering the idea of resort wear and for advocating eco-friendly fashion. In 2010, he revived the traditional Goan attire of the kunbi sari. He convinced Pratibha Patil, Priyanka Gandhi and Sonia Gandhi to be its patrons, thus increasing the cost from a meagre ₹700 (equivalent to ₹980 or US$10 in 2023) to more than ₹7,000 (equivalent to ₹9,800 or US$100 in 2023), for the benefit of the weavers. He was also a part of the khadi movement, and even promoted it at the world's largest organic fair, BioFach, at Nuremberg, Germany, in 2011 when he was invited there. In 2017, he presented a collection for plus-size women at the Lakme Fashion Week in 2017.

Rodricks dressed many over the decades. When his close friend Lisa Ray decided to get married in 2012, she chose a gown designed by him. In 2014, he paid tribute to actress Rekha at the Wills Lifestyle India Fashion Week (WIFW), on the occasion of her 60th birthday. Rodricks helped Deepika Padukone, who had been modelling with him for roughly two years then, get her debut role in Om Shanti Om, by recommending her to Malaika Arora, who in turn recommended her to Farah Khan in 2007. He also helped Anushka Sharma, launching her as a model in his 2007 Les Vamps Show at the Lakme Fashion Week and encouraged her to move to Mumbai when she was just 18 years old.

In 2016, he announced his retirement from his label, to concentrate on his museum. He handed over creative control to his student, Schulen Fernandes, who first worked with him in 1999.

=== Acting ===
Rodricks made cameo appearances in the 2003 film Boom and in the television play True West in 2002. He also played himself in the 2008 film Fashion.

=== Writing ===
Rodricks contributed to journals of travel and art, and wrote about food, especially Goan cuisine.

In 2012, Rodricks released his autobiography, titled The Green Room. The books was the result of a writing challenge by Goan author, Venita Coelho.

In 2017, he released Poskem: Goans in the Shadows. It is a work of fiction about poskem, orphans taken in by well-off Goan families, who were employed as servants. The book features illustrations by Mario Miranda.

Books
Year of Publication	Name	Notes	Reference
2012	Moda Goa: History and Style	Goan Fashion	
2012	The Green Room	Autobiography	
2017	Poskem: Goans in the Shadows		

=== Other pursuits ===
From 1993 onwards, Rodricks resided in a 450-year-old house in Colvale, named Casa Dona Maria. In 2016, he and his partner moved to a smaller house nearby to convert the larger one into a museum of Goan fashion, named the Moda Goa Museum and Research Centre. The museum was initially set to open to the public in March 2020. Rodricks worked on collecting exhibits for it since 1998, when he began his research into Goa's costumes and clothing. He had since collected 800 exhibits, ranging from an original pano bhaju, to Reita Faria's bathing suit (which won her the title of Miss World in 1966), to an apsara found in a nearby field dating to a Buddhist monastery from the 7th century. As of May 2024, the museum was not opened publicly. After Rodricks' death, his partner, Marell, has been working to complete the museum for its opening.

Rodricks was also one of the speakers at TEDxPanaji 2019.

== Activism ==
Rodricks wrote a column in the Goa-based monthly Goa Today, where he often raised issues of social concerns and the environment. In the mid-2000s, he began a mailing list with Margaret Mascarenhas, urging citizens to report cases of lack of waste management. He spoke out against the IRFW (India Resort Fashion Week) in 2012 stating that it "damages the environment". In 2018, he started a helpline for the LGBTQ community with the help of Ruby Almeida, the co-chair of Global Network of Rainbow Catholics. In 2019, he petitioned against the demolition of a 100-year-old church in Colvale, Goa. He had previously closed one of his boutiques in a resort owned by a mine owner, in protest of the illegal mining in Goa. He also unsuccessfully campaigned against the cutting down of six mango trees to make a highway in Colvale, citing that they were more than 200 years old.

Wendell Rodricks was a patron of the KASHISH Mumbai International Queer Film Festival, the annual LGBTQ film festival in Mumbai, and instituted an award for Best Poster Design in 2012 and continued to support the award every year. He also picked the winning entry every year as the Honorary Judge, with his keen aesthetic eye.

== Personal life ==
Rodricks was actively homosexual since he was 19 years old, and formalized his relationship with a wealthy French businessman named Jerome Marrel in a Civil solidarity pact in Paris in 2002. He had met Marrel in Oman through a friend who set them up while Rodricks was working there for the Royal Oman Police (ROP) Officers Club in 1983. Rodricks credited Marrel for his success as a fashion designer, in his autobiography, The Green Room. They both loved travelling and had visited over 150 countries together.

Rodricks lived and worked in Bombay (Mumbai) until the 1993 Bombay bombings, following which he moved with his partner Marrell and their pet dogs to his ancestral village of Colvale in Goa. He donated towards the improvement of the village and started a scholarship for the toppers of the schools of the village, in memory of his parents.

Rodricks was Roman Catholic, and a founding member and prominent activist of the LGBT Catholic advocacy group Rainbow Catholics India. He was the godfather of Arhaan Khan, the son of the film-maker Arbaaz Khan and his ex-wife Malaika Arora. Rodricks played a large role in forming the career of Arora and remained close to her and her family.

== Death ==
Rodricks died on 12 February 2020 at his residence in Colvale, Goa, at the age of 59. On 13 February, the Goa Police announced that they were still investigating the cause of his death, although it was allegedly reported that he had been suffering from a prolonged illness. A close friend of his reported that he had died due to heart failure during an afternoon nap. His funeral was held on 13 February at the St Francis of Assisi Church, Colvale.

== Awards ==
- Padma Shri in 2014
- Chevalier de l'Ordre des Arts et Lettres (transl. Knight of the Order of Arts and Letters) in 2015
- Rainbow Warrior Award in 2014 by KASHISH Mumbai International Queer Film Festival
