= Santan Rodrigues =

Indian poet

Santan Rodrigues (died 14 July 2006) was a Bombay (Mumbai)-based poet writing in English. He is rated as one of the prominent poets who has written in the language from Western India.

== Literary output ==
According to WorldCat Identities, as an author and editor, Rodrigues has produced four works in eleven publications in the English language and his literary production can be found in 62 library holdings.

== Critical evaluation ==
Rodrigues has been praised by other prominent poets from the area, as in this tribute in the Mumbai Mirror on his first death anniversary:

Santan was an important figure in poetry in the 70s. Along with three or four other poets, Santan founded and edited the little poetry magazine Kavi which he struggled to keep going. Along with Melanie Silgardo and Raul da Gama Rose, Santan founded the small publishing house Newground, a poets’ cooperative. The first book they published (with a cover by Arun Kolatkar) was their own work, Three Poets. But they went on to publish other emerging poets, and the books were always beautiful to look at and affordably priced. The importance of this venture cannot be over-estimated. Big publishers would not touch unknown poets. Newground published my first book Fix in 1979, Saleem Peeradina’s First Offense in 1980, and Manohar Shetty’s A Guarded Space in 1981.

— Eunice de Souza, Mumbai Mirror

== Books authored ==
His published works include:

- The Youseholder Yogi, Life of Shri Yogendra (Book, published in five editions between 1982 and 2008)
- Nissim Ezekiel Remembered (Book, published in two editions in 2008)
- I Exist: Poems, 1970-1972 (Book, two editions published in 1976)
- Three Poets (Book, two editions published in 1978)
