= Caridade Damaciano Fernandes =

Portuguese novelist (1904–1948)

Caridade Damaciano Fernandes (1904 – 7 October 1948) was a prolific Portuguese Konkani novelist and a pioneer of prose fiction writing in that language. He has been called "the father of Konkani novels". Caridade Damacian died on 7 October 1948, yet his legacy is still remembered and celebrated.

== Life ==
Caridade Damacian was the only child of Manuel Fernandes (from Maina, Goa) and Maria M. Mascarenhas (from Corjuem). His birth-date is unknown.

He was born in humble circumstances, which nonetheless did not deter him from following his literary pursuits. He was from the Maina ward of Aldona, and was the son of a farmer. His mother was a cook, who went to homes offering her services at cooking and making Goan sweets. He became a seaman, married Maria Luisa de Souza of Parra, and they had no children. He lived for most of his adult life in Bombay, and rose to literary fame in the 1930s.

Caridade and Maria's home was in front of the Sacred Hearts of Jesus and Mary Home for the Aged, and they were childless. Their original home has been sold and a new one taken its place.

Caridade Damacian died on 7 October 1948, but his legacy is still remembered and celebrated. When Caridade died, he was just 44 years of age, and was buried in the Aldona cemetery. In his short life, he wrote over a hundred romans, as the Konkani action novel has been called.

After Caridade Damacian's death, his wife worked as a cook in people's homes to earn a living.

== Works ==
Caridade Damaciano Fernandes' first book was Armida, published in 1931. For some years, he wrote and published a small book every week via the Victoria Printing Press in the city then called Bombay. The book was brought out each Wednesday, and priced one anna (or, six paisa), one-sixteenth fraction of a rupee. Brazinho Soares Kalafurkar, a Santa Cruz, Goa, based avid collector of the Konkani printed word, has said that Fernandes wrote and (probably self-published) around 101 romans novels. Many of his novels and novellas were around thirty pages thick. Their content focused on gripping tales of adventure and romance, featuring stereotyped characters, love-scenes, and endings characterized by poetic justice.

Caridade Damacian's last book was Goenchem Colvont ('the Goan whore'), written in the year of his passing in 1947, and printed by the Mapusa-based Tipografia Laxmi.

His most noted novels are Julus Patxai, Armida, Ankvaricho Cheddo, Rio Rita, and La Beatrice.

It is believed that after writing his work, he would consult with the three medical-doctor Elvino de Souza brothers, also from the village of Aldona: Carlos (b. 1901), the dentist Mousinho (b. 1908), and surgeon Olinto ORL (b. 1909). They were contemporaries of Caridade (Caru). Olinto migrated to Hong Kong in 1929 when he was 20.

Caridade Damacian was also the editor of The Emigrant, an English-language weekly published in Bombay. D'Lima however identifies The Emigrant as being a "Konkani-English weekly" published by E.C. Carvalho.

=== Other contributions ===
Caridade Damacian is also known to have composed diverse songs for the plays staged by village youth for the Christmas season, usually organised between 26 December to 6 January.

He is credited with having started the Bhurgeanchem Fest (Feast for Children) at the Chapel of the Holy Cross, in honour of St Luis Gonzaga, near his home at his ward. He composed a hymn which is still sung by people on the occasion.

== Achievements and legacy ==
It was announced in 2019 that Caridade Damacian would have a street named after him in Aldona.

At a function held in October 2019, he was termed a "novelist, journalist, song composer and celebrated literary son of Goa" and also called the "Romansincho Bapui" (Father of Konkani Novels). This function was held in the parish hall of his village of Aldona in Goa.

Caridade Damacian has been called one of the "gems" of Aldona, a North Goa village from the sub-district of Bardez, which itself became known as the village of priests, nuns and tiatrists (Konkani dramatists). Alfred Rose, the prominent singer and Konkani culture protagonist, also from Aldona, called Fernandes the Romansincho Pai (The Father of the Konkani Romans Novels).

He was known to be a creative and prolific writer. D'Cruz quotes the noted Indian Express former editor Frank Moraes as saying

He has only to pick a page and a pen and ideas from his imaginative mind flow to his pen in a cascade.
