= Shankar Ramani =

Indian poet (1922–2003)

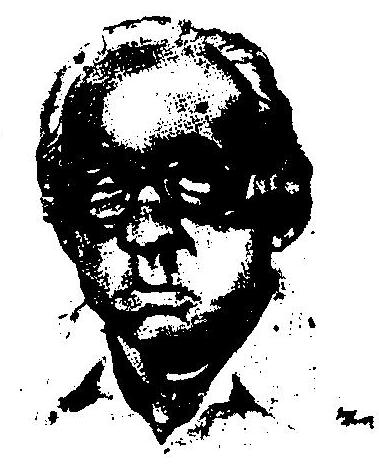
- Born: 26 June 1922; Verem, Bardez, Portuguese India
- Died: 28 November 2003 (aged 81)
- Occupations: Poet, administrative officer
- Writing career
- Language: Konkani, Marathi
- Notable work: Nile Nile Brahma
- Notable awards: Sahitya Akademi Award (1996)

Shankar Ramani (26 June 1922 – 28 November 2003) was an eminent Indian poet from Goa who wrote in both Konkani and Marathi. He is regarded as an eclectic and significant figure in Konkani literature, particularly for his contributions to the development of the modern Konkani poem.

== Early life and education ==
Ramani was born on 26 June 1922 in Verem, Bardez, Portuguese Goa. He completed his early education in Marathi at Panaji and subsequently pursued Portuguese studies, completing his education at Lyceum. He then attended St. Joseph's Institute in Vasco for English-medium education, passing his Matriculation in 1945.

He spent a significant portion of his life in Belgaum.

== Literary career ==
Ramani wrote poems on love, spirituality and nature. His work indulged in the emotional and social aspects of human existence. His poetry mainly rhymes and is lyrical.

He first started writing poems in 1937, while still in school, with his first work being a parody poem titled "Pakhara Yeshil Kadhi Partuni". His first published poem appeared in the weekly Prakash in 1939. He went on to contribute poetry to various magazines, including Nayan, Zharapkar, Kirloskar, Swadesh, Mahadwar, and Dudhsagar.

== Works ==
Shankar Ramani authored five collections of Marathi poetry and three in Konkani. The following are his published works:

=== Marathi ===
- Suryaphul (1950) – A children's poetry collection.
- Katarvel (1959)
- Abhaalvata (1967)
- Palan (1979)
- Garbhagar (2000)

=== Konkani ===
- Joglanche Jhaad (1987)
- Nile Nile Brahma
- Niranjan
- Brahmakamal

== Awards and honours ==
Ramani received several accolades for his literary contributions:

- Sahitya Akademi Award: He won the Sahitya Akademi Award in 1996 for his Konkani poetry collection Nile Nile Brahma.
- Gomant Sharada Award: In 2009, the Kala Academy, Goa, posthumously selected him for the Gomant Sharada Award, the state's highest honor for Marathi and Konkani literature, in recognition of his lifetime contribution to the field. He had previously received a literary award from the Kala Academy in 1975.
- Maharashtra Rajya Puraskar: His collection Abhalwata was awarded the Kavi Keshavsut Puraskar by the Government of Maharashtra in 1968. He was also a recipient of the Maharashtra Rajya Puraskar (Maharashtra State Award) for his Marathi poetry.
- Other award-winning collections include Pallan, Darpaniche Deep, Garbhagarh, and Brahmakamal.

== Personal life ==
Professionally, Ramani worked for the river navigation department prior to the liberation of Goa, eventually serving as an Administrative Officer in the River Navigation Department of the Government of Goa before his retirement in 1980.

Ramani was initially married to Kamal, who died in 1973. He then married Leelabai.

== Death ==
Ramani died on 28 November 2003.

== Legacy ==
Ramani's life and work were memorialized in a documentary film titled Zaad Nirakar, directed by Dnyanesh Moghe.

In 2022, the Vengurlekar Fine Art Centre in Panaji organized Chitranjali, an exhibition of paintings by 12 Goan artists based on Ramani's poems to commemorate his birth centenary. In 2023, further celebrations were held across Goa and Maharashtra to commemorate the centenary of his birth.
