= Peter Nazareth =

British literary critic and writer (born 1940)

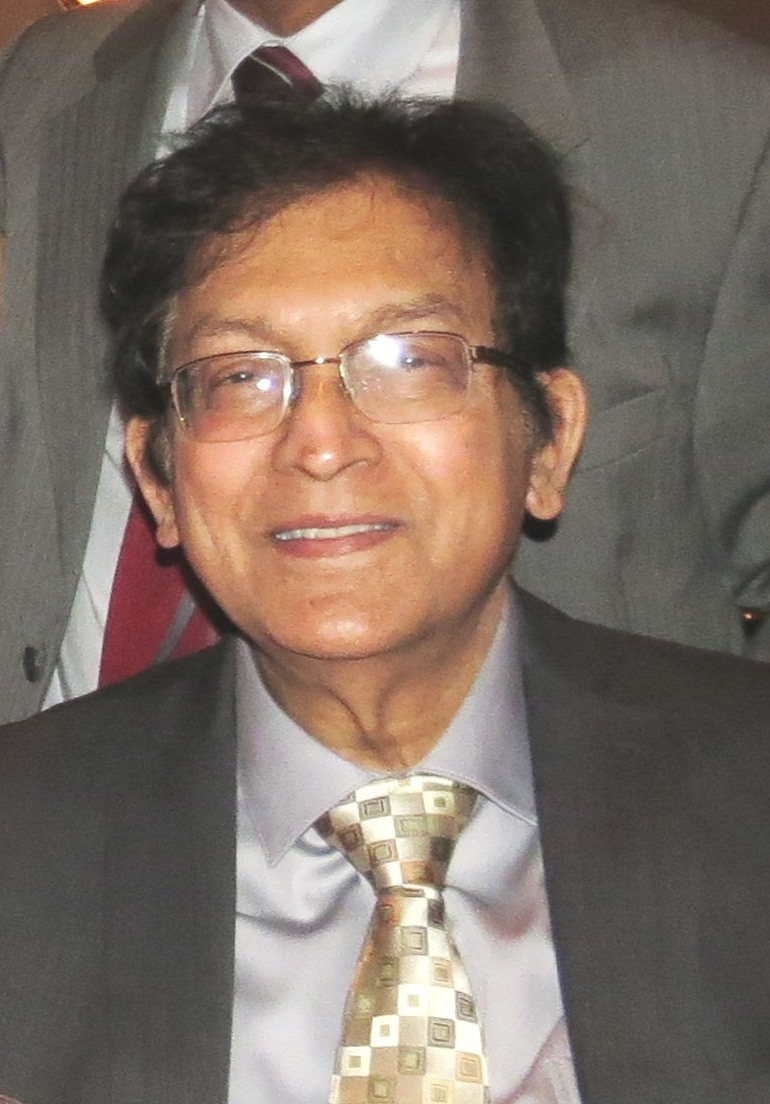
- Born: April 27, 1940; Kampala, Uganda
- Died: May 22, 2026 (age 86); Ashburn, Virginia
- Education: Makerere University, Kampala, Uganda; University of Leeds, Leeds, U.K.
- Occupations: Professor, literary critic and writer
- Spouse: Mary Nazareth (1964-2026)
- Children: 2

Peter Nazareth (April 27, 1940 - May 22, 2026) was a British, African born, Goan literary critic and writer of fiction and drama.

He is known as one of the important figures in East African literature. He is also recognized for his work on African, Caribbean, African-American, and Goan literature.

== Life ==
Peter Nazareth was born in Uganda. He is of Goan descent, tracing his roots to the village of Moira, in Goa. His mother's family was earlier based in Malaya-Malaysia-Singapore. He was educated at Makerere University (Kampala, Uganda), where he received his BA in English Literature in 1962, and completed postgraduate studies at the University of Leeds in England.

While residing in Africa, he simultaneously served as senior finance officer in Idi Amin's finance ministry until 1973, when he accepted a fellowship at Yale University and emigrated to the United States from Uganda. He moved to Iowa later in 1973, after he was invited to the International Writing Program at the University of Iowa. He lived there for 5 decades. He became a US citizen in 2009.

Nazareth died on May 22, 2026.

== In academia ==
Nazareth was a professor of English and African-American World Studies at the University of Iowa, where he was also a consultant to the International Writing Program. Nazareth taught that university's course "Elvis as Anthology", which explores the deep mythological roots of Elvis Presley's roles in popular culture. This class on Elvis led to Nazareth being interviewed by a range of publications — The Wall Street Journal, UPI, AP, World News Tonight With Peter Jennings, NBC's The Today Show, ABC Chicago, MTV, Voice of America, National Public Radio, the BBC, and the Cedar Rapids Gazette, among others, according to his CV.

He taught and wrote about African, Caribbean, African-American, Goan, and other literatures. His publications include In the Trickster Tradition: The Novels of Andrew Salkey, Francis Ebejer, and Ishmael Reed (1994); Edwin Thumboo: Creating a Nation Through Poetry (2008); and the long essay "Elvis as Anthology" in Vernon Chadwick (ed.), In Search of Elvis: Music, Race, Art, Religion. Nazareth edited Critical Essays on Ngugi wa Thiong'o (2000) and Pivoting on the Point of Return: Modern Goan Literature (2010). His first novel, In a Brown Mantle (1972), has been taught at the University of Pretoria and by Ngugi wa Thiong’o at U.C. Irvine.

His literary criticisms often involved observations of the fate of diverse global economic and academic migrants, spanning the Asian, African and black American cultural histories. This includes the Goan diaspora settled in Western countries, the post-Idi Amin Asian emigration from Eastern Africa, and the cultural superstitions of the pre-Obama presidency of American politics. Nazareth has edited a special issue of the journal Callaloo on Goan literature, and an anthology of its literature, and has championed the work of Mozambique-born Goan writer Violet Dias Lannoy.

== Family ==
He was married to Mary Nazareth for more than 60 years. They have two daughters and three grandsons. He retired from teaching in 2021 at age 81. That year his former student and accomplished writer Steve Ellerhoff published a dedication to him, Trickster Tactics: A Festschrift In Honor Of Peter Nazareth,* with 22 contributors from all over the world. Nazareth and his wife moved to Ashburn, Virginia, in 2023 to be closer to their daughters and their families. He passed away unexpectedly but peacefully on Friday, May 22, 2026, surrounded by family. A celebration of his life was held at the Goan Community Center in Brampton, Ontario, on August 1, 2026.

== Works ==
=== Books ===
- In a Brown Mantle, East African Literature Bureau, 1972; Nairobi: Kenya Literature Bureau, 1981.
- Literature and Society in Modern Africa, East African Literature Bureau, 1972; Kenya Literature Bureau, 1980; published as An African View of Literature, Evanston: Northwestern University Press, 1974.
- Two Radio Plays, East African Literature Bureau, 1976.
- The Third World Writer: His Social Responsibility, Nairobi: Kenya Literature Bureau, 1978.
- Literature of the African Peoples, Study Guide for Independent Study with audiotape/CD, Center for Credit Programs, The University of Iowa, 1983.
- A Feny Fele, Budapest: Europa Publishing House, 1984 (selected essays in Hungarian translation)
- The General is Up, Toronto: TSAR Books, 1991
- In the Trickster Tradition: The Novels of Andrew Salkey, Francis Ebejer and Ishmael Reed, London: Bogle-L'Ouverture Press, 1994.
- Edwin Thumboo: Creating a Nation Through Poetry, Singapore: Interlogue Series Vol. 7, Ethos Books, 2008.

=== Ebooks ===
- Re-Membering Singapore.
- Elvis -- Rewriting the World through Multicultural Movies.

=== Edited anthologies ===
- African Writing Today, special issue of Pacific Quarterly Moana, Hamilton, New Zealand: Outrigger Publishers, Vol. 6, No. 3/4, 1981.
- Goan Literature: A Modern Reader, issue of the Journal of South Asian Literature, East Lansing: Michigan State University, 1983.
- Critical Essays on Ngũgĩ wa Thiong'o, New York: G.K. Hall, 2000.
- Uganda South Asians Exodus: Kololian Perspectives (co-edited), University of Toronto, 2002.
