= Violet Dias Lannoy =

Mozambique-born Goan writer and teacher (1925–1973)

Violet Dias Lannoy (1925–1973) was a teacher and writer. Born in Mozambique to parents from Goa, India, she taught in schools and advised on educational policy all around the world. Lannoy, called "the lost Goan/Indian/African novelist" by critic and writer Peter Nazareth, wrote Pears from the Willow Tree, a posthumously published novel, besides short stories.

== Biography ==
Lannoy's parents were from Goa; her father, Josinho Dias, worked in Tanganyika as a civil servant, and her mother, Marina (Velho) Dias, came from Caranzalem. She and her siblings attended school in Belgaum and Bombay. She worked with Mahatma Gandhi in a refugee camp in the Punjab, was a teacher in North India for a while, and spent much of her life working all around the world, particularly for UNESCO, with, for a while, Paris as a base, where she lived in a small apartment on the Left Bank. For UNESCO she advised on educational matters in India, England, France, and East Africa.

Lannoy was a Christian in Goa, and of a relatively low caste; she challenged Indian associations with caste, but was critical of Catholicism as well for excluding non-Christians from redemption. Her first husband was Behram Warden; her second husband, Richard Lannoy, was a British photographer and writer, author of The Speaking Tree: A Study of Indian Culture and Society (Oxford University Press, 1971). She died in 1973 in St Albans, England, of a heart attack. When she died, her novel Pears from the Willow Tree was unpublished, as were some short stories; the novel was finally published by Three Continents Press in 1989, edited by C. L. Innes, who had become interested after hearing Peter Nazareth read a paper on his wife's life and work.

== Literary work ==
Lannoy's fiction reflects her life as a teacher and educator, and frequently her writing depicts teaching situations. Pears from the Willow Tree features a Catholic teacher from Goa, raised in the tradition of ideals derived from Gandhi and the Indian Independence Movement. The title is derived from a proverb, "When a man is confused, he expects pears from the willow tree", which refers to the generation of people coming to terms with the conflict between their Gandhian idealism and the political reality of an independent India.

Her second husband, Richard Lannoy, identified a number of distinct stages in the development of the novel. Inexperienced in creative writing, she began the draft when she and Lannoy were living in North India in the late 1950s; she taught at a school where most of her colleagues were Hindu, and she, a Goan Catholic, was regarded as an outsider. Her first forays into creative writing were influenced by Allen Ginsberg's Howl and John Berger's Painter of Our Time. The Lannoys moved around, and she spent a year in London, and read especially Isaac Babel deeply (and an essay by Lionel Trilling on Babel), and Babel's influence shows in Lannoy's "disturbing revelation of darker moral issues". She sent this draft to Richard Wright, and his positive comments made her decide to move to Paris, where she and her husband lived for the next few years. She was invited to Wright's farm, where the novel was discussed, and he was helping her look for a publisher, but his death was a crushing blow for her hopes, and Ellen Wright, Richard Wright's widow and literary agent for Simone de Beauvoir, could not find her a publisher. Now influenced by Elias Canetti and Fyodor Dostoevsky's "The Grand Inquisitor", she rewrote much of the novel, recasting some of the characters and introducing the betrayal of all-too optimistic ideals. A final polishing occurred in 1972, when the Lannoys had returned to Goa, but her death prevented publication.

Pears from the Willow Tree was called a school novel; its main character, Seb, teaches at a progressive but elitist school and hopes to teach and reach the children from "The Dump", but is unsuccessful, and discovers he is not just idealist but also ambitious. His ambition to become headmaster is thwarted. Charlotte Bruner praised the writer's fine sense of irony, and said it was a novel whose message applies outside India as well.

Certainly, the novelist's own worldliness is evident in the connections she makes between her travels and personal experience; as scholar R. Benedito Ferrão writes by drawing from Richard Lannoy's biographical introduction to his spouse's novel: "Dias Lannoy was also vocal about the Israeli occupation of Palestine, no doubt seeing in it the predicament of her own Goan compatriots. As Richard Lannoy ... describes it, the novelist considered Palestinians ‘her Eastern brethren.’”

Literary critic Peter Nazareth selected "Roses in the Grass" for a special issue of Callaloo on Goan literature (and later for an anthology of Goan literature); it concerns Wwamba, an old man who does the gardening for a white school in Kenya, among the Kikuyu people. Nazareth called it a "carefully textured" story, in which the gardener teaches both the students and the first black school teacher, in a disguised fashion, how to overcome the alienation of life in a white, colonial school.

The short story "The Story of Jesus--according to Mokuba, the beloved tribesman" covers the exam of a young African student at a missionary school in Kenya; he is asked to retell the story of Jesus in his own words, and does so by adapting that biography into his own culture, with Jomo Kenyatta once or twice standing in for Jesus. According to Margaret Robers, Lannoy's voice "continue[s] its opposition to the inappropriate imposition of Christian mythology on East African youth".

== Bibliography ==
- Pears from the Willow Tree. Edited by C. L. Innes, introduction and biography by Richard Lannoy, and afterword by Peter Nazareth. Washington, D.C.: Three Continents Press, 1989.

=== Short stories ===
- Lannoy, Violet Dias (1986). "The Bewitched". Callaloo. 27 (27): 279–94. doi:10.2307/2930644. JSTOR 2930644.
- Bruner, Charlotte H., ed. (1993). "The Story of Jesus--According to Mokuba, the Beloved Tribesman". The Heinemann Book of African Women's Writing. African Writers Series. ISBN 9780435906733.
- Nazareth, Peter, ed. (2010). "Roses in the Grass". Pivoting on the Point of Return: Modern Goan Literature. Goa 1556 / Broadway Book. ISBN 978-8190568258.
- Kalu, Anthonia C., ed. (2007). "The Story of Jesus--According to Mokuba, the Beloved Tribesman". The Rienner Anthology of African Literature. Boulder: Lynn Rienner. pp. 708–22. ISBN 9781626375833.
