= Jessica Faleiro =

Indian writer

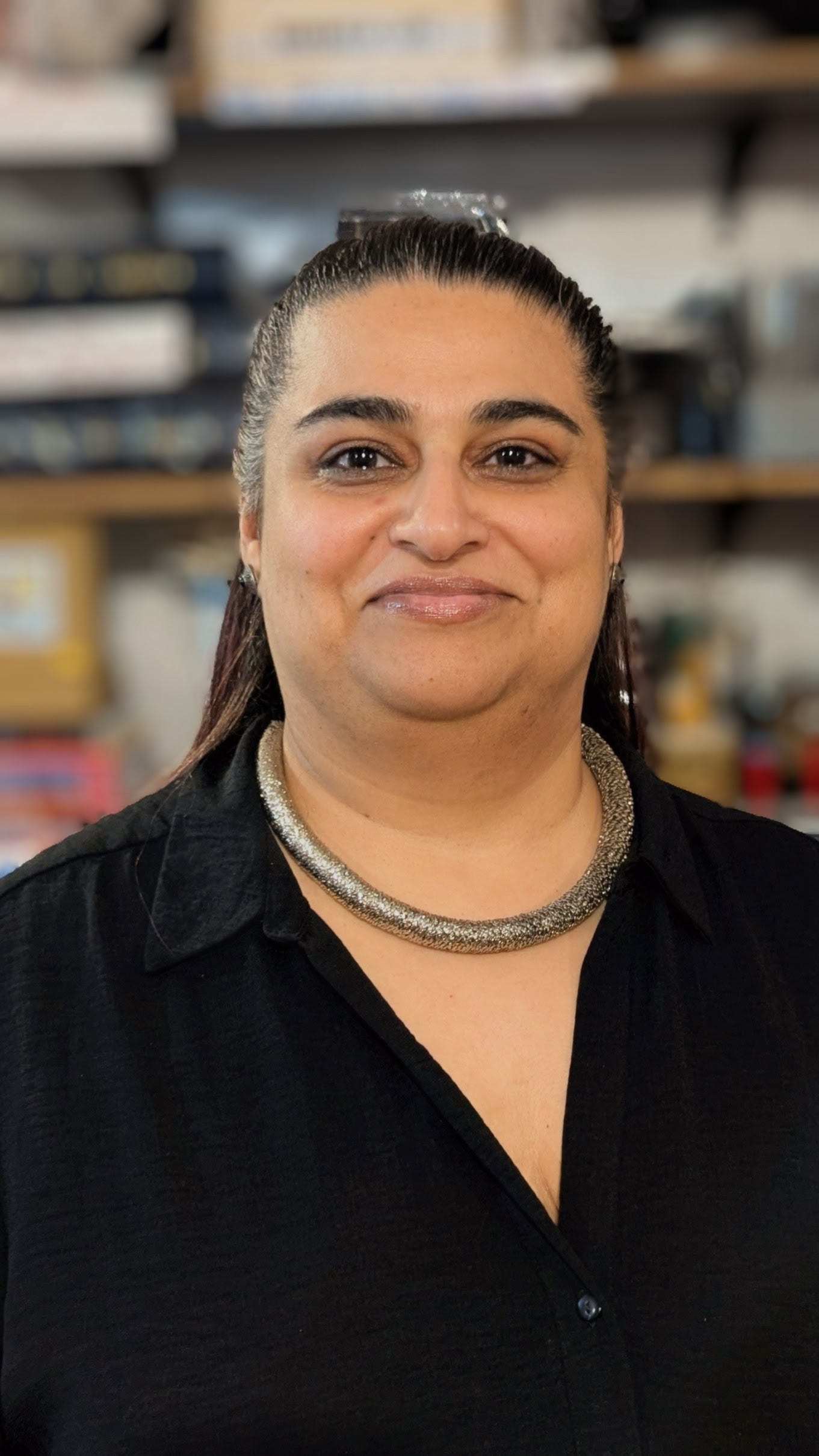
- Faleiro in 2025
- Born: Goa, India
- Education: University of Nottingham Lancaster University Kingston University
- Occupations: Author, novelist, editor
- Writing career
- Notable works: Afterlife: Ghost Stories from Goa (2012); The Delicate Balance of Little Lives (2018)
- Website: jessicafaleiro.com

Jessica Faleiro is an Indian author and novelist from Goa. She is known for her books Afterlife: Ghost Stories from Goa (2012), and The Delicate Balance of Little Lives (2018).

== Career ==
Faleiro previously worked in international development. Her first book, Afterlife: Ghost Stories from Goa, a collection of inter-linked ghost stories set in modern Goa, was published in 2012.

Her second book, a literary novel titled The Delicate Balance of Little Lives (2018), explores the lives of five middle-class, Goan women and how they cope with various kinds of loss.

Her work has also appeared in anthologies. In 2018, she co-edited, with R. Benedito Ferrão, a special issue of the João Roque Literary Journal that focuses on Goan diasporic writing and is titled "Goa and its Worlds: A Literary Journey."

Faleiro is also a creative writing mentor and conducts writing workshops. She also writes about travel.

== Personal life ==
Faleiro was brought up in Kuwait by her parents, who were Goan. She studied at University of Nottingham, Lancaster University and Kingston University, UK. She has lived and worked in various countries, including Kuwait, India, the USA, the United Kingdom and France.

== Works ==
- Afterlife: Ghost Stories from Goa (2012)
- The Delicate Balance of Little Lives (2018)
- The Greatest Goan Stories Ever Told (2022)
- 100 Indian Stories: A Feast of Remarkable Short Fiction from the 19th, 20th and 21st Centuries (2025)
