= Maria Elsa da Rocha =

Indian writer and poet (1924–2007)

Maria Elsa Gertrudes da Rocha
- Born: 1924; Aldoná
- Died: 2007 (aged 82–83)
- Occupation: Primary School Teacher
- Writing career
- Genres: Short Story, Poetry

Maria Elsa da Rocha (1924–2007) was an Indian short-story writer and poet in the Portuguese language.

== Life ==
Maria Elsa da Rocha was a school teacher by profession, which took her all over Goa (and Damão). The experiences she accrued would feed into her stories, which were also often based on hearsay and anecdotes.

== Works ==
Throughout the 1960s, Rocha contributed short stories to the Margão-based Portuguese language newspaper A Vida, in which she co-edited a cultural page together, and the Portuguese-language programme 'Renascença' broadcast on All-India Radio.

In 2005 a collection of her short stories appeared under the title Vivências Partilhadas [Shared Lives].

=== Vivências Partilhadas ===
Vivências Partilhadas provides widest range of representations of the Goan subaltern in Portuguese-language Goan literature post-1961, with a particular focus on the experiences of women, though this deep-seated sympathy at times appears to be at cross-purposes with a certain social conservatism. Rocha's writing is notable for the use she makes of particularly Goan-inflected Portuguese and the considerable use of Konkani in her dialogues.

== Bibliography ==
Maria Elsa da Rocha. Vivências Partilhadas. Panjim, India: Third Millennium, 2005.

Maria Elsa da Rocha. Shared Lives: The Collected Stories of Maria Elsa da Rocha, trans. Paul Melo e Castro. Saligão, India: Goa 1556, 2023.
