= List of loanwords in Konkani =

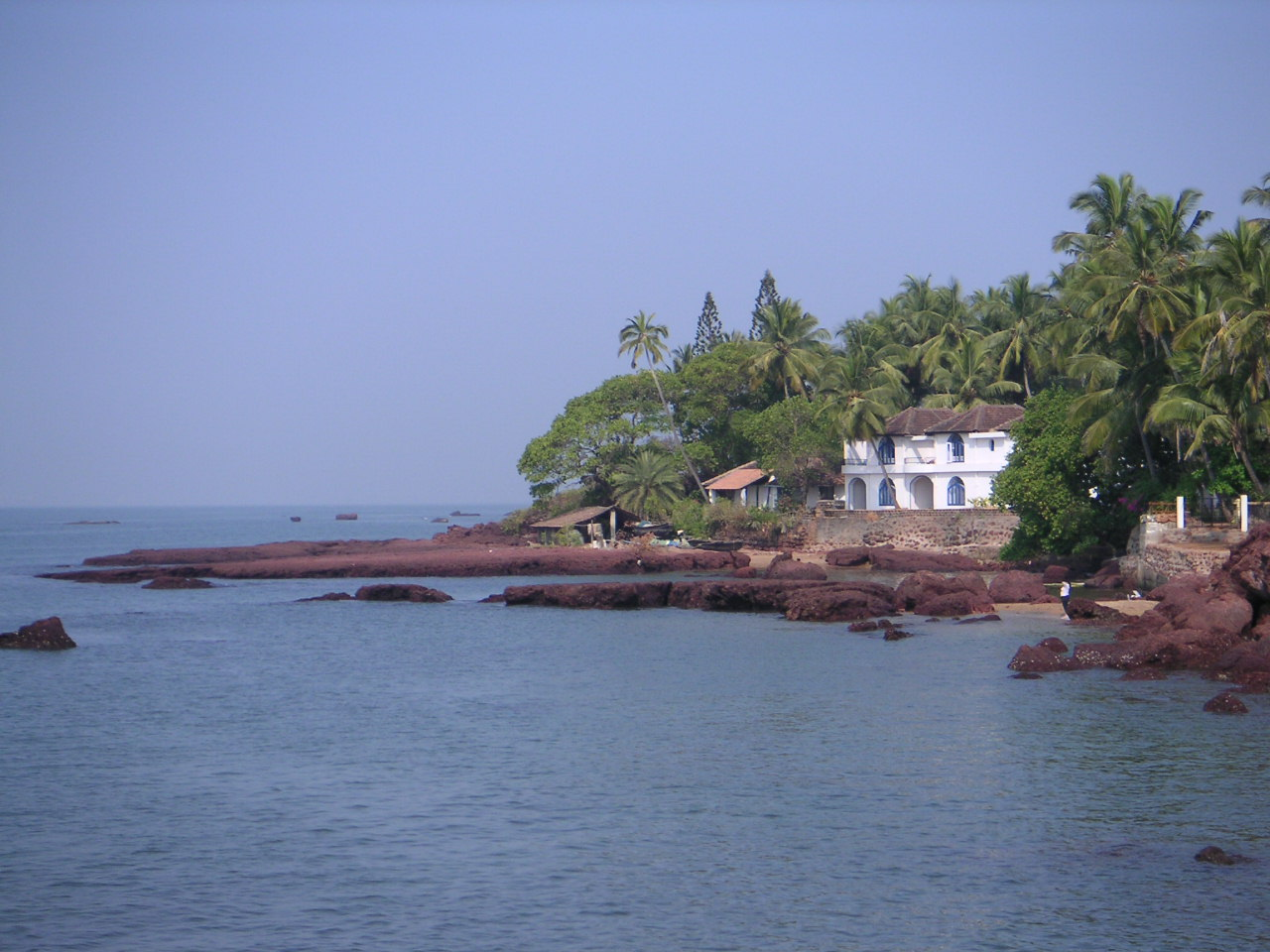
Goa coastline at Dona Paula

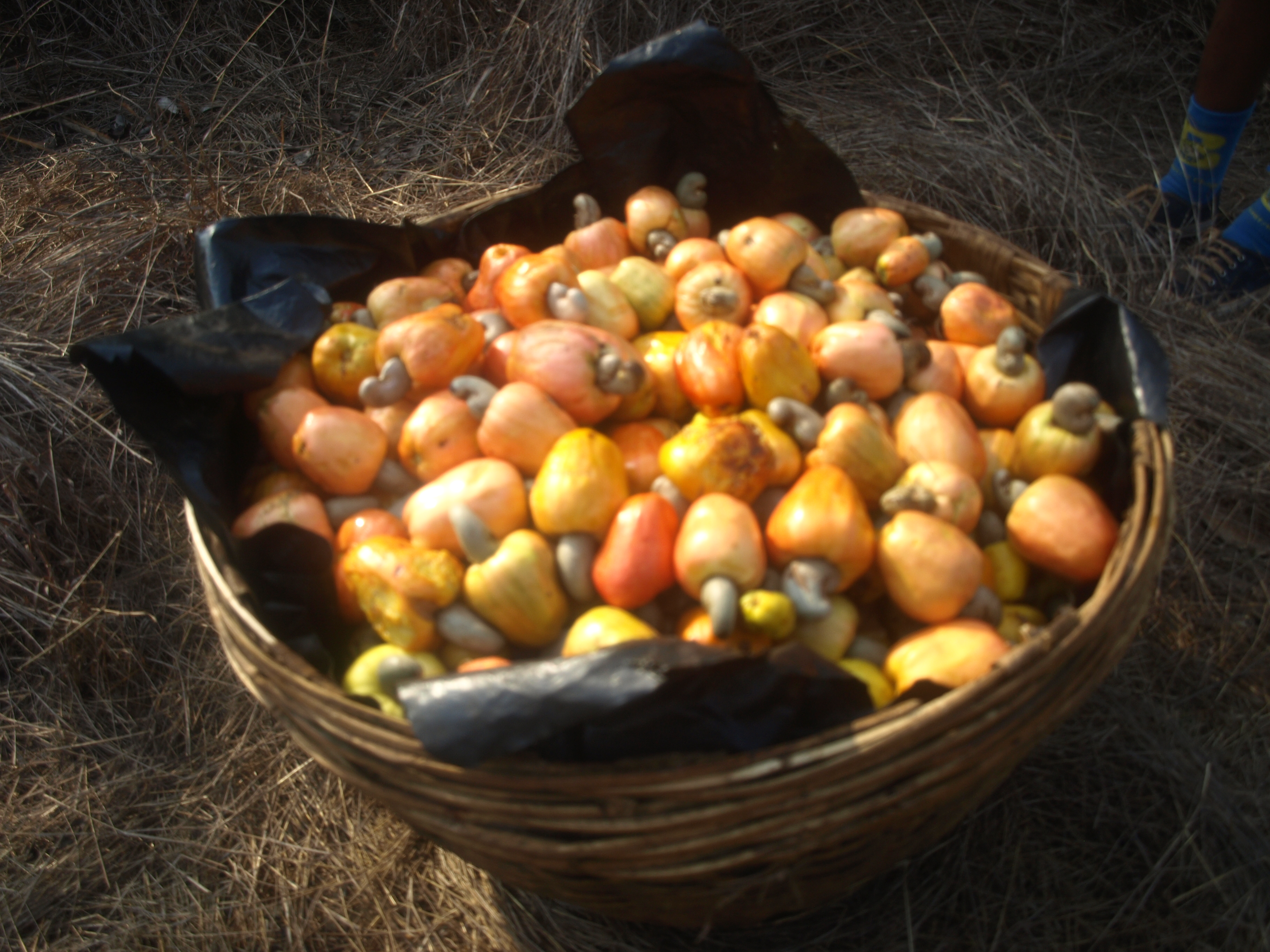
Cashew apples after plucking in Chorão, Goa

The Konkani language spoken in the Indian state of Goa has loanwords from multiple languages, including Arabic, Portuguese, English and Kannada. This is a list of loanwords in the Konkani language.

== Portuguese words in Konkani ==
For references see

=== Catholic spiritual terms with Latin origins ===
Konkani	Latin	Portuguese	English
Aamen	Amen	Amén	Amen
Alma	Anima	Alma	Soul
Padri	Patrem	Padre	Priest
Bom	Bonum	Bom	Good
Doth	Dotarium	Dote	Dowry
Fest	Festa	Festa	Feast
Interrak	Interrare	Enterrado	Interred/Burial
Madri	Matrem	Madre	Nun
Rit	Ritus	Rito	Rite
Sagrad	Sacris	Sagrado	Holy
São/Sant	Sanctus	São/Santo	Saint/Holy

=== Phrases ===
Konkani	Portuguese	English
Bom Fest	Boa festa	Happy Feast
Bom Jesu	Bom Jesus	Good Jesus
Obrigad	Obrigado	Thank you
Cantar	Cantar	Sing/chant
Cantar Miss	Cantar Missa	Sung Mass/Extraordinary Mass
Santa Cruz	Santa Cruz	Holy Cross
Khuris/Cruz	Cruz	Cross
Carnaval	Carnaval	Carnival
Carne	Carne	Meat
Sakrament	Sacramento	Sacrament
Cinz	Cinza	Ashes
Bautismo	Baptismo	Baptism
Sagrad Comunhao	Sagrada Comunhão	Holy Communion
Confessiao	Confissão	Confession
Sacrifis	Sacrifício	Sacrifice
Pascoal	Pascoal	Relating to Easter
Inferno	Inferno	Hell
Pentecostant	Pentecostes	Pentecost
Natal	Natal	Christmas
Besauñ	Bênção	Blessing
Igorz	Igreja	church
Kopel	Capela	Chapel
Capainha	Campainha	Bell
Simitér	Cemitério	Cemetery
Firgorz	Freguesia	Parish
Spirita Santa	Espírito Santo	Holy Spirit
Kazar	Casar	To marry
Casament	Casamento	Marriage/Wedding
Recepcao	Recepção	Reception
Festa dos Reis	Festa dos Reis	Feast of the Kings

=== Family relationships ===
Konkani	Portuguese	English
Afilhada	Afilhada	Goddaughter
Afilhado	Afilhado	Godson
Avô	Avô	Grandfather
Avó	Avó	Grandmother
Irmãna	Irmã	Sister
Irmanv	Irmão	Brother
Madrin	Madrinha	Godmother
Mãi	Mãe	Mother
Padrin	Padrinho	Godfather
Pai	Pai	Father
Prim'	Primo/Prima	Cousin
Tia	Tia	Aunty
Tiv	Tio	Uncle

=== Family last names ===
Konkani	Portuguese	English	Meaning of Portuguese word
Alemão	Alemão	Alemao	German
Baretto	Barreto	Baretto	Barnet
Carvalho	Carvalho	Carvalho	Oak, Oak Wood or Oak Tree
Cordeiro	Cordeiro	Cordeiro	Lamb
Coelho	Coelho	Coelho	Rabbit
Correia	Correia	Correia	Strap
Dias	Dias	Dias	Days plural of Dia
Fernandes	Fernandes	Fernandes	Son of Fernando
Figueira	Figueira	Figueira	Fig tree
Furtado	Furtado	Furtado	Stolen (from regular verb Furtar to steal)
Leitão	Leitão	Leitao	Piglet
Lobo	Lobo	Lobo	Wolf
Machado	Machado	Machado	Axe
Madeira	Madeira	Madeira	Wood
Mendonça or Mendonsa	Mendonça	Mendonca	Mend
Nascimento	Nascimento	Nascimento	Birth
Noronha	Noronha	Noronha	Village Name
Palmeira	Palmeira	Palmeira	Palm Tree
Peixote	Peixoto	Peixote	derived from Peixe (Fish)
Pereira	Pereira	Pereira	Pear tree (Pera) fruit
Pinto	Pinto	Pinto	Modification of Pintar (regular verb) which is painter
Salgado	Salgado	Salgado	Salty or with Salt (sal)
Sardinha	Sardinha	Sardinha	Sardine fish
Travasso	Travasso	Travasso	Tragedy
Trinidade	Trindade	Trinidade	Trinity
Verdes	Verdes	Verdes	Greens

=== Culinary terms ===
Konkani	Portuguese	English
Doce	Doce	Sweet
Assado	Assado	Roast
Refogar	Refogar	Sauté - French
Racheado	Recheado	Stuffed
Torrad	Torrado	Toast
Rissois	Rissois	Rissoles

=== Kitchen items ===
Konkani	Portuguese	English
Kuler	Colher	Spoon
Garf	Garfo	Fork
Suri	Faca	Knife

=== Food produce (plant and animal) ===
Konkani	Portuguese	English
Arroz/seeth	Arroz	Rice
Batatt	Batata	Potato
Yangim	Berinjela	Eggplant
Caju	Cajú	Cashew
Popai	Papaia	Papaya
Tomat	Tomate	Tomato
Paer/per	Goiaba	Guava
Kobi	Couve	Cabbage
Couve-flor	couve-flor	Cauliflower
Onos	Ananás	Pineapple
Naarl	Coco	Coconut
Laranj	Laranja	orange
Camarao/sungta	Camarão	Prawn/Large Shrimp
kombi	Galinha	chicken
dukra mass	leitoa	pork

=== Food Products ===
Konkani	Portuguese	English
Assad	Assado de Carne	Roast Beef
Kombiecho assad	Assado de frango	Roast Chicken
Assad Leitao	Leitoa assada	Roast Pork
Bol	Bolo	Cake
Samusa	Chamuças	Samosas
Choris	Chouriço	Sausage
Pão	Pão	bread
Choris Pão	Chouriço Pão	Sausage Bread
Sungtache rissol	Rissois de Camarão	Prawn Puffs
Torrad Pão	Torradas	Bread Toast
Sod	Soda	Soda Water
Vinagre	Vinagre	Vinegar
Vinho	Vinho	wine
Porto	Porto	port wine
Madeira	Madeira	Madeira (wine)
Feni	Feni	Feni an alcoholic drink originating in Goa
Caju Feni	Caju feni	Cashew Feni
Sorpotel	Sarapatel	Pork Curry

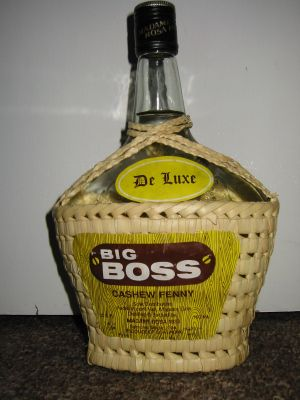
A bottle of Big Boss cashew feni

=== Daily use words ===
Konkani	Portuguese	English
Zonelle	Janela	Window
Kodelle	Cadeira(s)	chair(s)
Mezz	Mesa	Table
Armar	Armário	Cupboard
Camisa	Camisa	Shirt
Tanki	Tanque	Tank
Kor – –	Cor	Colour
Kustar/kuhsht	Custar	Difficult

=== Education terms ===
Konkani	Portuguese	English
Tint	Tinta	Ink
Prosor	Professor	Teacher
Lisavn	Lição	Lesson
Kadern	Caderno	Exercise Book

=== Professional terms ===
Konkani	Portuguese	English
Adogad	Advogado	Advocate
Dotor	Doutor	doctor
Pintari	Pintor	Painter
Ord	Ordem	order
Selad fol	papel selado	Stamped paper

=== Geographical descriptors ===
Konkani	Portuguese	English
Bombaim	Bombaim	Mumbai
Viaje	Viagem	Voyage
Mar	Mar	Sea
Praer	Praia	Beach
Cidade	Cidade	City
Vaddo	Aldeia	Village
Zon	Zona	District
Communidad	Comunidade	Community

=== City and town names in Goa ===
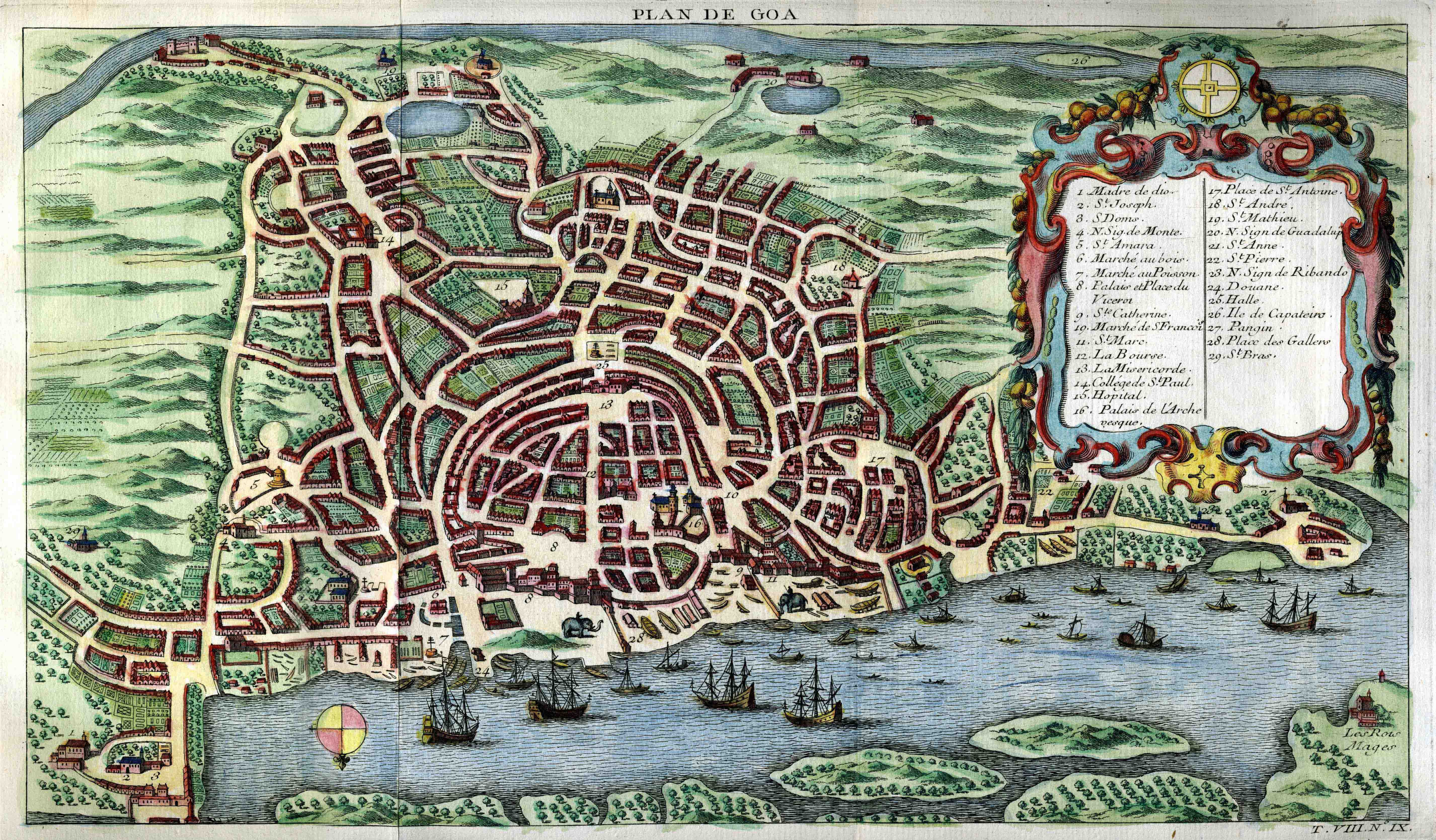
Mapa de Goa, in Histoire générale des Voyages, Jean-Baptiste Bénard de la Harpe, 1750

Konkani	Portuguese	English
Alto	Alto	High
Alto Betin	Alto Betim	High Betim
Goa Velha	Goa Velha	Goa 'The Old'
Velha Goa	Velha Goa	Old Goa
Vasco da Gama	Vasco da Gama	Vasco da Gama
Dona Paula	Dona Paula	Owner/lady Paula
Santa Cruz	Santa Cruz	Santa Cruz
Ilhas	Ilha	Island
Reis Magos	Reis Magos	Three Wisemen

=== Residential and business addresses ===
Konkani	Portuguese	English
Bairro	Bairro/Bairrista	Neighbourhood/Local
Bandh	Banda	Sideways
St Agostino	São Agustinho	Saint Augustine
Primeiro	Primeiro	First
Segundo	Segundo	Second
Cabesa	Cabeça	Head

=== Architectural terms ===
Konkani	Portuguese	English
Pared/wonti	Parede	Wall
Galeri	Galeria	Gallery
Balkani	Balcão	Balcony
Varand	Varanda	Verandah

=== Miscellaneous words ===
Konkani	Portuguese	English
Govet	Gaveta	Drawer
Pixol	Pincela	Brush
Tizulo	Tijolo	Brick
Kulchanv	Colchão	Mattress
Burak	Buraco	Hole
Sak	Saco	Bag
Susegad	Sossegado	Quiet/peaceful
Sai/gagro	Saia	Skirt
Calção	Calções	Shorts
Sabu/Sabaun	Sabão	Soap
Banc	Banco	Bench
Julab	Julapa	Laxatic
Lilanv	Leilão	Auction
Mest	Mestre	Carpenter/Master
Sorpotel	Sarapatel	Pork curry
Cabar	Acabar	Finished
Bolss	Bolso	Pocket

== French words in Konkani ==
- lofddem – affair (from “l’affair”)
- kartus – cartridge
- parval – parole
- tamret – stool
- bank – bench
- voltair – rocking chair (from ‘Voltaire’, renowned French writer)

== Kannada words in Konkani ==
- Aapa – Father from Kannada appa
- Aaka – Sister from Kannada akka
- Duddu – Money
- Rokhdo – Quick
- Poiso addko – Wealth
- Halsannddem / alsannnddom – Kind of Bean
- Tantim – Eggs
- Kemp – Precious stone, red
- Modd – Cloud / Storm
- Bagil – Door
- Chilki – Latch
- Boddi – Stick, or to beat up
- Bhennd – Back (from Kannada bennu)
- Koyto – sickle from Kannada koy, to chop or cut
- Miravanuk – Procession from miravanige
- Veergal – Hero stone from veerakallu
- Got'tu na – Don't know from gottu illa
- Angadd – Shop from angadi
- Mando – Head

== Arabic / Persian words in Konkani ==
- fasal - crop
- jawab - answer
- kabul - agree
- karz - debt
- chabuk - whip
- chugli - gossip
- dang - engrossed
- hak - right
- had'd - boundary
- hairan - harassed
- fakt - only
- dusman - enemy
- akkal - intelligence
- bhogos - pardon
- bandar - port
- barik - thin
- nazuk - delicate
- baag - garden
- arz - request
- ajap - wonder
- xar - city
- khuni - murderer
- nadar - glance
- saitan - satan
- hajir - present
- garib - poor
- goroz - necessity
- virasat - heritage
- sahib - master (originally means companions of the prophet Muhammad)
- tazviz - arrangement
- guneanv - crime
- buniad - foundation
- zap - answer
- khobor - news
- xivai - without
- vogot - time
- forok - difference
- abru - respect
- ondu/avndu - this year
- bejar - harassed
- noxib - fate
- taktik - urgency
- iad - remember
- farik - repay
- maja - joy
- umed - enthusiasm
- bazar - market
- tarikh - date
- murvat - respect
- badal - change

Some words are also used wherein the original meaning has been changed or distorted:

- Mustaiki (clothes) from mustaid = ready
- bekar bahas (idle talk) gives bhikar bhaso (useless philosophising)
- kapan khairo - eater of one's own shroud - miser

== English words ==
- spanner- pan'no
- false - phaals (could be of Portuguese origin too)
- washer (ring between two joining surfaces or between a nut and a bolt) - vicer
- shock absorber - chak'up'ser
- cleaner (assistant to a bus driver) -- kilinder
