= Augusto do Rosário Rodrigues =

Indian writer and poet (1910–1999)

- Born: 1910; Benaulim, Goa, Portuguese India
- Died: 1999 (aged 88–89)
- Writing career
- Language: Portuguese: Portuguese (until 1961); Indian (from 1961)

Augusto do Rosário Rodrigues (1910 – 1999) was an Indian short-story writer and poet.

== Life ==
Very little is known about the life of Augusto do Rosário Rodrigues. He was born in 1910 and appears to have been an advocate by profession. He appears to have died in 1999. He was born in the village of Benaulim in Portuguese Goa. Many roads in Benaulim are named after him following his death.

== Work ==
Rodrigues produced short stories for the "Renascença" programme of All-India Radio, which were later collected and published in a collection entitled Contos Regionais, or "Regional Stories", in 1987. Given that this title was also used by the Goan short-story writer José da Silva Coelho, whose work was rediscovered by Vimala Devi and Manuel de Seabra, there is a possibility that Rodrigues was giving a sly wink back to his predecessor. Two of his stories have been translated into English: O Capitão Tarimbeiro (as Risen from the Ranks) and O Herdeiro dos Cabrais (as The Scion of the Cabral Family).

== Themes ==
Many of Rodrigues's stories are historical, ranging from the eighteenth century right up until his present day. Focussing on Goa's Catholic community, his stories often revolve around issues of decline and recovery. The Goan critic Bailon de Sá described his collection as showing a sort of "inside out exoticism".
