= John Aguiar =

Indian poet and lyricist

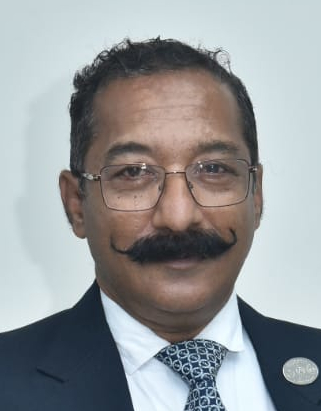
- Aguiar in 2022
- Occupations: Poet; writer; songwriter; journalist
- Years active: 2007–present

John Aguiar is an Indian Konkani poet, writer, lyricist and journalist. His songs have been broadcast over the All India Radio network, mainly in Goa and on CDs.

== Personal life ==
Professionally, Aguiar was an officer with the Government of Goa's Department of Information and Publicity. He has been a journalist since his college days, associated with newspapers such as O Heraldo, West Coast Times, and others.

He was also Honorary Company Commander of Home Guards at Panaji and is listed in Vandana Seth”s book, 200 famous persons of Goa.

== Career ==
=== Music ===
His song Viva Carnival, musically composed and sung by Mukesh Ghatwal was chosen as the Goa carnival theme song in the year 2012. In November 2011, he was a contributor to 'Swatantra Goa', a patriotic album consisting five Konkani and three Marathi songs produced by Buyao Theatres Goem.

Aguiar wrote a bhakti geet (devotional hymn) on Lord Ganesha which was also composed and music arranged and sung by Mukesh Ghatwal, a first of its kind in Konkani language.

Apart from All India Radio, his songs are in popular on CDs like Valley of Colorz, Ek Natem, Buyao Rocks so also devotional CDs like Grateful to Jesus and Hey, Damodara by well-known music composer Siddhnath Buyao. One of his songs is on Lord Damodar, the popular deity of Margao in South Goa, a single solo was composed by Dilip Vaze and sung by Samiksha Bhobe.

He has been on the cast of the film Planning Devachem, which had its premier in January 2018 in Margao, Goa.

=== Poetry ===
He has written four books of Konkani poems and one English book of essays. Presently, he is working on another book in the Roman script Konkani. Has also written several articles on social themes on local newspapers. He was nominated for the best lyrics award at the Kalangan at Mangalore, for the World Konkani Music Awards in 2010.

== Awards ==
Aguiar won the Gulab Writer of the Year Award in 2011. He has been a recipient of The Navhind Times Ex-NCC Achiever Award for Literature in 2012, and is an Honorary Company Commander of the Home Guards organisation. He bagged "Goa Chief Minister's Gold Medal" for Meritorious Services in the Home Guards in December 2007. Aguiar bagged Konkani Bhasha Mandal's Rock Barreto Literary Award in the year 2017 for his book Olyo Yadi.

He won the Presidents Medal for Home Guards and Civil Defence for Distinguished Services in 2012. In 2013, he received a commendation from Director General of Civil Defence, Ministry of Home New Delhi for his services in Home Guards and Civil Defence Organisation.
