= Júlio Gonçalves =

Portuguese writer (1846–1896)

- Born: Luís Manuel Júlio Frederico Gonçalves c. 1846; Nova Goa, Goa, Portuguese India
- Died: 1896 (aged 49–50)
- Other names: J. Gonçalves
- Occupation: Writer
- Years active: 1860s–1896
- Employer: Publica Livraria, Academia Militar de Goa

Luís Manuel Júlio Frederico Gonçalves (1846 – 1896), also known by his pen name J. Gonçalves, was a Portuguese writer. Referred to by his contemporaries as the "Alexandre Herculano of Goa", he had a foundational role in developing Portuguese-language writing in the Portuguese colony of Goa.

== Career ==
A lawyer by training, Gonçalves served in public administration, most significantly as librarian of Publica Livraria, Academia Militar de Goa.

Portugal's Regeneration saw the reintroduction of the press to Goa, along with expanded Portuguese education, and in its wake, Gonçalves founded and ran the monthly journal Ilustração Goana from 1864 to 1866. 'It focussed on literary and historical themes, with some incursions into the natural sciences' and carried Gonçalves's Bosquejos Literários, literary critical pieces, perhaps the first pieces of modern literary criticism in Goa.

Gonçalves is noted today as a writer of short stories, which he wrote in two series: Contos da Minha Terra and Aventuras de um Simplício. They are reckoned "some of the very first efforts to European-style literary fiction to a Goan setting" and show the influence of European romanticism. Two of his works are available in English translation.
