= Manuel C. Rodrigues =

Goan poet and writer (1908–1991)

Manuel C. Rodrigues (1908 – 1991) was an early Goan poet and writer, who expressed himself in the English language. He was also an artist, as well as a trained singer and conductor. He is also known as Manoel C. Rodrigues.

== Selected works ==
=== Verse ===
- Selected Poems, Bombay 1978. Rs 10.
- Homeward, G. V. Bhave, 1939.

=== Short stories ===
- Still-life and other stories, Coastal Observer, 1984.

=== Essays, etc ===
- 'Armando Menezes: The Lyrist, A fundamentally religious poet'. The Goan World, Bombay, Jan. 1939, 31.
- 'Mar-Jakin', Goa Today, August 1976.

== References to work ==
Critic and Professor at the Department of English, University of Iowa, Peter Nazareth list his work in the context of his (Nazareth's) experiences while creating an early (1983) anthology of Goan literature.

In his essay on nostalgia, the lament of the "Goan exile" and the "search of a Goan self", the late Professor Emeritus of English Literature at Washington DC, Eusebio C. Rodrigues has referred to his work, saying he (Manuel C. Rodrigues) "has two collections of poems with significant titles: Songs in Exile and Homeward."

Writing in an essay titled 'Saudades and the Goan Poetic Temper: Globalising Goan Cultural History', in the book Goa and Portugal: History and Development, Victor Anand Coelho, Professor of Music and Chairman of the Department of Musicology and Ethnomusicology at Boston University, writes: "...George C. Coelho probed other things within this rich corpus of poetry such as nostalgia which manifests in [Goan] Christian poets like Armando Menezes (1902–83), Manoel C. Rodrigues (1908–91) and Joseph Furtado (1872–1947) and the theme of exile which carries with it the theme of longing for homeland and voyage, but also takes on a political function."

== Personal life ==
His two-centuries old family home is located in the coastal village turned tourist-destination of Calangute just off the Baga-Calangute Road near the Our Lady of Piety Chapel.

His brother, Olimpio Coleto Rodrigues (born 1915), is a Goan artist and collector of antique furniture. He is known for his work which incorporates Indian influences into Christian Art. According to media reports, in 1950 he was commissioned to paint a fresco near the Sistine Chapel in the Vatican.
