= R. V. Pandit =

Indian poet (1917–1990)

Raghunath Vishnu Pandit
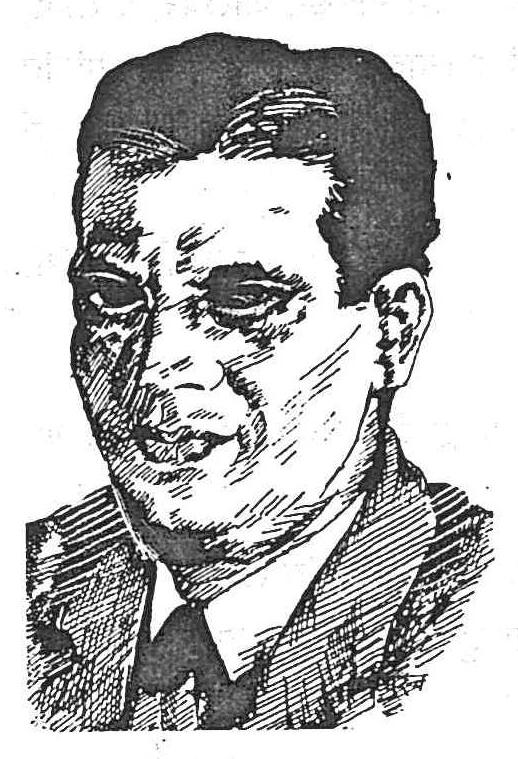
- Born: 6 April 1917; Ribandar, Portuguese Goa
- Died: 23 September 1990 (aged 73); Margao, Goa, India
- Occupations: Poet, journalist, photographer
- Movement: Quit India movement; Goan independence movement
- Awards: Sahitya Akademi Award (1975); Padma Shri (1982)

Raghunath Vishnu Pandit (6 April 1917 – 23 September 1990) was a renowned Indian poet, journalist, photographer, and freedom fighter from Goa. He made significant contributions to Konkani literature and was an active participant in both the Indian independence movement and the Goa liberation movement. He was honored with several national and international accolades, including the Padma Shri in 1982.

He is best known and most celebrated for his vast amount of Konkani poetry. Pandit also wrote significantly in Portuguese after the annexation of Goa in 1961, and also wrote in Marathi. Much of his work was written in a neo-realist style demonstrating a marked concern for the downtrodden sections of Goan society. Among his most noted achievements are the publication of five books of poetry on one day (26 January 1963) and the Sahitya Akademi Award for his 1975 Dariā Gāzotā.

A monograph on Pandit has been written by S. M. Tadkodkar, a Konkani-Marathi poet and Head of Department of Marathi Goa University. It was published by Goa Government's Goa Konkani Akademi, in 2006.

== Early life and education ==
Raghunath Vishnu Pandit was born on 6 April 1917 in Ribandar, Portuguese Goa. He grew up in a large family as the eldest brother and the only son among eight sisters. He completed his primary schooling in Pali and Shirdon. For his higher education, he moved to Poona, where he completed his Bachelor of Science (B.Sc.) and Bachelor of Arts (B.A.) degrees.

== Activism and freedom struggle ==
Pandit was deeply involved in nationalist movements against colonial rule:

- Quit India Movement (1942): He worked as an underground activist during the movement. During this period, he authored and published biographies of several prominent satyagrahis.
- Interviews with national leaders (1945): He interviewed Mahatma Gandhi and Jawaharlal Nehru on the subject of "Quit Goa" (Goem Chodo). The publication of these interviews helped spread awareness of the Goan liberation cause across India.
- Goan Community (1946): While in Poona, he helped establish an organization named the "Goan Community" for Christian Goan students residing there, functioning under the leadership of Joachim Dias.
- Satyagraha and arrest (1946): On 21 September 1946, he accompanied Ram Manohar Lohia during his second visit to Goa. On the same day, Pandit staged a satyagraha in front of the Kulem police station, resulting in his arrest and a prison sentence of one and a half months.
- Belgaum phase (1946–1948): Following his release, he moved to Belgaum, from where he continued to direct activities for the liberation of Goa.
- Subsequent imprisonments: After moving to Mumbai in 1950, his activist colonial resistance led to further imprisonments in the years 1954 and 1956.

== Journalism and photography ==
In 1950, Pandit relocated to Bombay, where he launched a Marathi monthly magazine titled Bharati.

Aside from his writing, he was an accomplished photographer. He worked closely with Mahatma Gandhi as both a journalist and a photographer. His photographic work was widely published in major English and other contemporary Indian periodicals. He also compiled and published a dedicated collection of photographs focused on Gandhi.

== Literary career ==
Pandit began writing extensively in the Konkani language in 1952. His work brought a distinct stylistic transformation to Konkani poetry, often employing free verse to present realistic portraits of Goan society and the character of its common people. His literary themes prominently centered around Goa, the Konkan region, and humanity, heavily incorporating elements of local folklore.

His writings have been translated into multiple languages, including English, Hindi, Kannada, and Portuguese.

=== Published works ===
Prior to his prominent Konkani phases, he authored books in English:

- Gandhiji (1945)
- National Leaders (1946)

In 1963, he simultaneously published five major Konkani poetry collections:

- Aylem Tashem Gaylem
- Mhajem Utar Gavdyachem
- Urtalem Tem Rup Dhartale
- Dharterechem Kavan
- Chandraval

His subsequent book publications include:

- Lharam
- Reventlim Pavlam
- Naach Re Mora
- Mogache Avndhe
- Charam
- Darya Gajota (also referred to as Darya Gajeta)

=== Other literary contributions ===
- Folklore: He authored a book on folklore titled Streedhan.
- Children's Literature: He wrote several books for children, including God God Kanyo (Parts 1 and 2), Bhurgyanlyo Kanyo, and adapted stories from the Ramayana and Mahabharata.
- Compilations: He compiled his son's childhood utterances and expressions into a publication titled Shekharachi Diary.

== Awards and honors ==
Pandit received extensive recognition both within India and internationally for his literary and social contributions:

=== National awards ===
- Padma Shri (1982): Awarded by the Government of India in recognition of his services to literature.
- Sahitya Akademi Award: Conferred for his poetry collection Darya Gajeta.
- Kala Academy Award
- Goa Government State Award (Goa Sarkar Rajya Puraskar)

=== International awards ===
- United Nations Day International Award and Rizal Gold Medal (1977): Awarded in the Philippines.
- Diploma of Appreciation (1969): Awarded by the World Congress of Poets for his collection of poems.
- Honorary Doctorates: He was conferred honorary doctorate degrees by institutions in Brazil, the Philippines, and the United States.
