= António Mascarenhas (writer) =

Indian writer (1916–1993)

- Born: 24 February 1916; Divar, Goa, Portuguese India
- Died: 1993; Chicalim, Goa
- Other names: Antonio Inacio Salvador Matias Mascarenhas
- Occupation: Writer

António Mascarenhas (24 February 1916 – 1993) was an Indian writer best known as the author of the book Goa from Prehistoric Times (1987). He wrote in the English language.

== Life ==
António Mascarenhas was born at his mother's ancestral home in Divar, Goa, Portuguese India, on 24 February 1916. He was baptized as Antonio Inacio Salvador Matias Mascarenhas and spent his early childhood in Zanzibar and his school years at St. Paul's School, Belgaum, after which he joined the Society of Jesus.

He completed the Gregorian University Ph L summa cum laude. Although he remained a layman, later marrying and raising a family, he was philosophically a Jesuit.

His work took him between India and Portugal and among teaching, real estate, radio, travel planning and writing. He died in 1993 at home in Miraton Gardens, Chicalim, Goa, and was buried on the Jesuit feast day.

== Works ==
Among his known works are the following.

=== Poems ===
- Poems (Tipografia Rangel, Bastora, Goa, c. 1984)

=== Collected radio talks ===
- Glimpses of the Goan Past (? c. 1958)
- Essays for Diplomats on the Case of Goa (Edições Paulistas, Lumiar, Lisboa, c. 1958)
- A Critique of Sir S Radhakrishnan's 'Basis for Human Fellowship (Edições Paulistas, Lumiar, Lisboa, 1959) OCLC 9378530
- Goan Life and Outlook (? c. 1960) OCLC 48263220
- An Introduction to Goan Folksongs, Volume 1 ([year unknown] Centro Cultural Goês, Lisboa) which also appeared in a translation by Maria Suzette Carvalho and Tony Mascarenhas (the author's nephew) under the title Dulpodam (c. 1960, Centro Cultural Goês, Lisboa). OCLC 52870914
- Introduction to An Introduction to Goan Folksongs, Volume 2, Mande which appeared in Portuguese as Poesias do Povo Goês by Maria da Paz Cabrita de Barros Santos and Jesuino de Noronha (c. 1960, Centro Cultural Goês, Lisboa).

=== Travel guides ===
- Open Sesame, Lisbon! (Edições Paulistas, Lumiar, Lisboa, no date printed) OCLC 503797880
- Open Sesame, Fátima! (Edições Paulistas, Lumiar, Lisboa, no date printed)
- To Fátima and There. Text and photography by the author (? self-published)
- Fátima, A Shrine of Luminous Silence (Edições Francisco Mas, Lisboa, 1967)

=== Biography ===
- Father Joseph Vaz of Sancoale (Self-published, Goa, c. 1980)

=== Language ===
- A Concise Konkani Grammar (Tipografia Rangel, Bastora, Goa, 1984)

=== History ===
- A Tourist's History of Goa (Instituto Menezes Bragança, Panjim, Goa, 1981)
- Goa from Prehistoric Times (Self-published, Goa, 1987) OCLC 80210438

== Citations ==
- Universidade de Aveiro | Fundação Portugal-Africa [1997-2015]
- Carlos A. Moreira Azevedo, ed., Bibliografia para a História da Igreja em Portugal (1961-2000), Centro de Estudos de História Religiosa, Lisboa, 2013, ISBN 978-972-8361-56-3
- Thomas Paul Urumpackal, Organized Religion According to Dr. S. Radhakrishnan, Università Gregoriana Editrice, Roma, 1972
- Robert Neil Minor, Radhakrishnan: A Religious Biography, State University of New York Press, 1987. ISBN 0887065546
- Bibliography, Luso-Brazilian Review, Vol. 6, No. 2 (Winter, 1969), pp. 104–115, University of Wisconsin Press.
- SP Agrawal, Rajeev Kumar Sharma, Government and Politics in India: A Bibliographical Study, Concept Publishing, New Delhi, 1993. ISBN 8170224160
