= Melanie Silgardo =

Indian poet and editor (born 1956)

Melanie Silgardo (born 1956) is an Indian poet and editor based in London, UK.

== Biography ==
Raised by Goan Catholics parents in Bombay, India, she studied under poet Eunice de Souza and became one of India's major English-language poets in the 1970s. With fellow poets Santan Rodrigues and Raul D' Gama Rose, she established the Newground cooperative which published their works. While studying in London, she published Skies of Design in 1985, which won the Asian Section of the Best First Book Commonwealth Poetry Prize. Until the mid-1990s, she worked at the feminist Virago Press before turning to creative writing and teaching.

== Education ==
Born in 1956 in Bombay, she studied English at the city's St. Xavier's College, graduating in 1976. She went on to earn an M.A. in English literature from the University of Bombay in 1978.

== Works ==
Her early works were published in Three Poets – Melanie Silgardo, Santan Rodrigues, Raul d’ Gama Rose (1978). In 1985, while studying at the London College of Printing, she published a second collection of poems, Skies of Design, which won the Asian award under the Best First Book Commonwealth Poetry Prize. From the late 1980s to the mid-1990s, she worked as commissioning editor for the feminist Virago Press where she consulted with clients of colour and developed a large collection of Arab women's contributions to English-language writing in Opening the Gates (1980). In 2012, together with de Souza, she edited anthology These My Words: the Penguin Book of Indian Poetry. Although she has not published any further poetry, she is still considered to have played an important role in support of women's poetry, not only for her own work but for the interest she has devoted to women's writing.

While Silgardo follows in the footsteps of Eunice De Souza, her poems are far more violent, as can be seen in her poem "Bombay", attacking the development of the city. De Souza herself finds that Silgardo's poems are "deeply emotional but never mawkish".

== See also ==
- List of Indian writers
