= Margaret Mascarenhas =

American novelist and poet

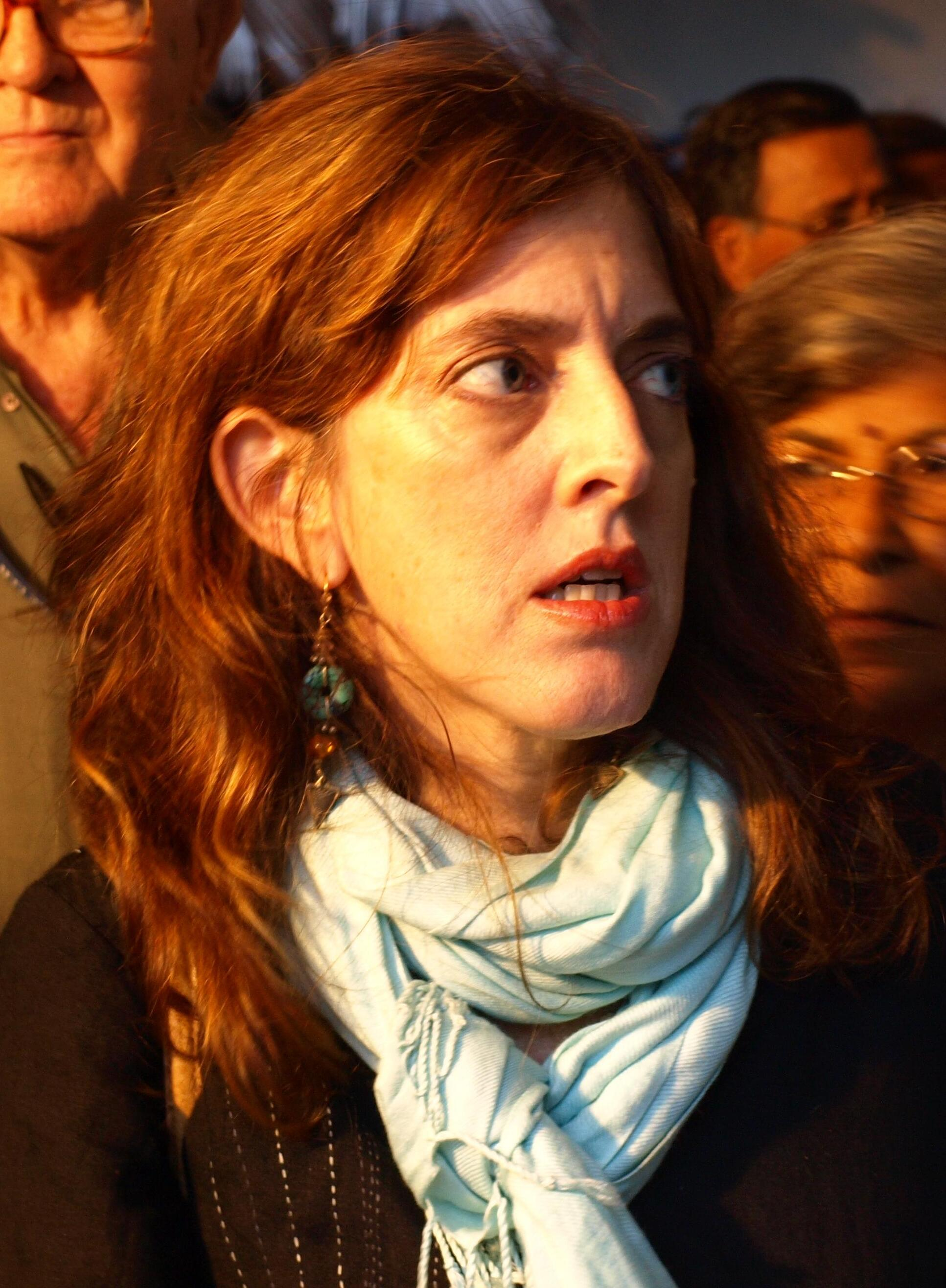
- Mascarenhas in 2008
- Born: Ann Arbor, Michigan, U.S.
- Died: 14 July 2019; Goa, India
- Occupations: Poet; author; essayist; curator
- Writing career
- Notable work: Skin; Triage--casualties of love and sex

Margaret Mascarenhas (died 14 July 2019) was an American novelist, poet, essayist and independent curator based in Panjim, Goa. Born in the United States and of Goan origin, she spent some of her childhood years in Caracas, Venezuela. She died on 14 July 2019.

== Early life ==
Margaret Mascarenhas was born in Ann Arbor, Michigan, to a Goan father and an American mother, Milana. She had a sister, Fernanda.

== Career ==
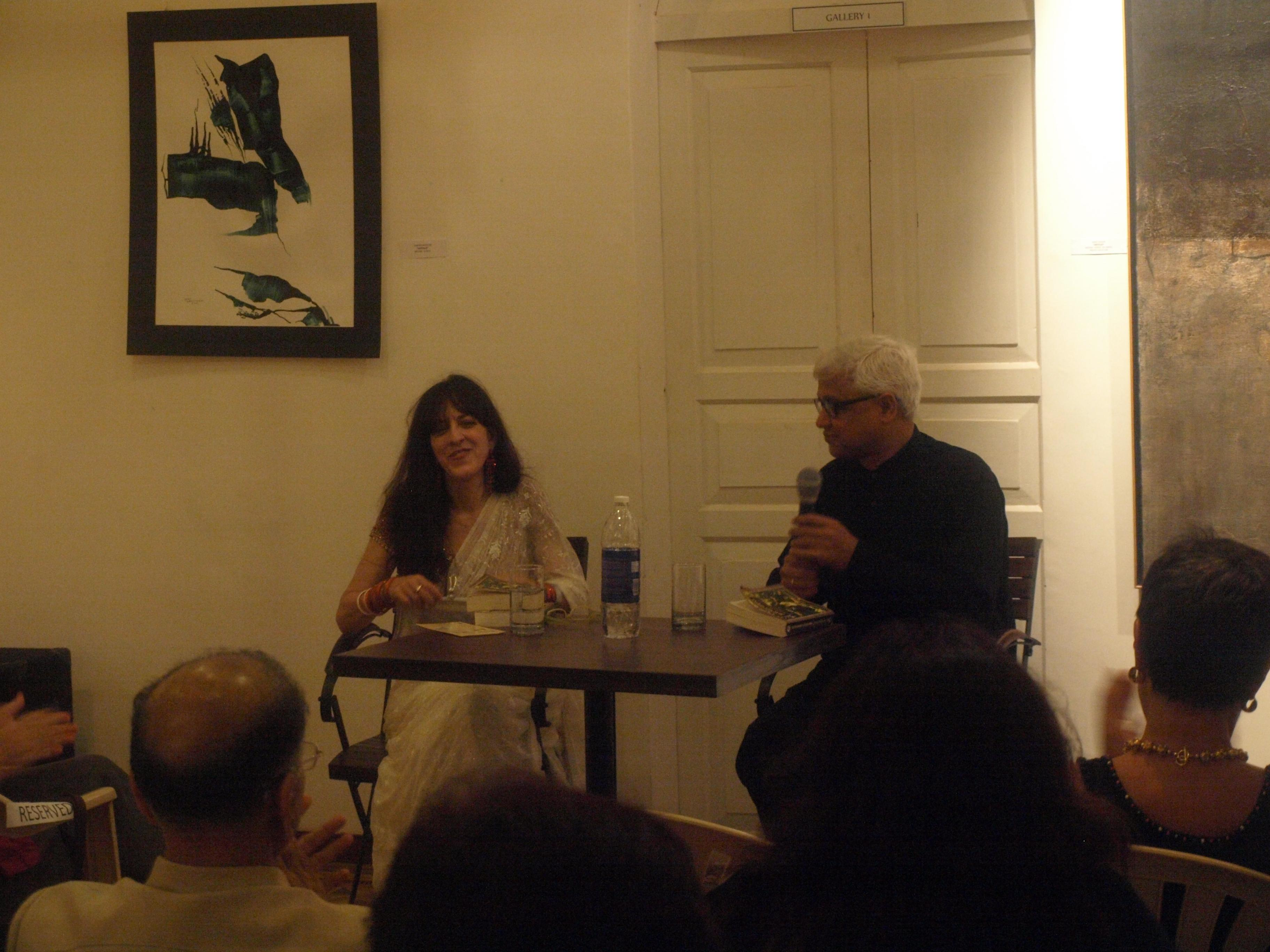
Mascarenhas at the release of The Disappearance of Irene Dos Santos with Amitav Ghosh.

She was the author of the novels Skin and The Disappearance of Irene Dos Santos.

Skin, a diasporic novel, moves from a bar in California to life in a Goan village and has formed part of the post-colonial academic discourse around the world since it was published by Penguin in 2001. Skin has been described as a "story of a contemporary woman who traces her cross-continental family diaspora which originates with the Portuguese slave trade in India in the 17th century." It has been translated into French as La Couleur de la Peau (2002) and in Portuguese as A Côr da Pele (2006). Critical work on the author's novel Skin appears in Across Continents: Writing Goans, Making Worlds (2026) by R. Benedito Ferrão.

The Disappearance of Irene Dos Santos was selected for the Indie Next List and was a Barnes & Noble Discover Pick in 2009.

Her poetry and sketch collection, Triage--casualties of love and sex was released in 2013.

=== Fiction ===
- Skin. Penguin 2001; ISBN 0-14-100465-7
- The Disappearance of Irene Dos Santos. Hachette 2009: ISBN 978-0-446-54110-7

=== Poetry ===
- Triage--casualties of love and sex. HarperCollins 2013; ISBN 978-93-5116-005-2

=== Other writing ===
Mascarenhas' essays and articles have been published in Marg, Colloquio Letras, Urban Voice, and elsewhere. Her op-ed columns and book reviews have appeared in numerous print and online publications, including Outlook, India Today, TOI Crest, Hindustan Times, Goa Today, and The Navhind Times Panorama. A close friend of Vamona Navelcar's, her essay on the artist appears in Goa/Portugal/Mozambique: The Many Lives of Vamona Navelcar (2017).

== Other pursuits ==
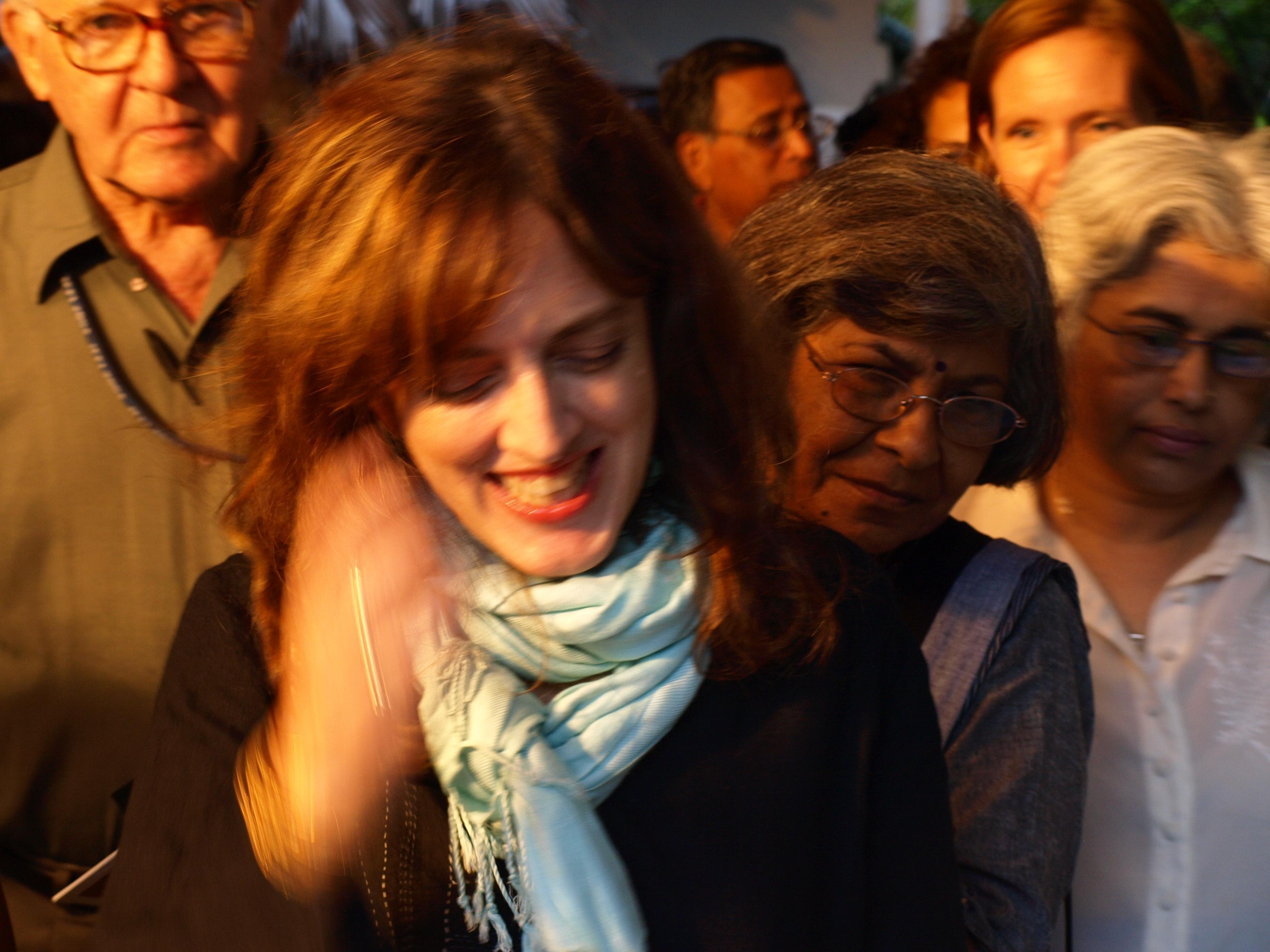
Margaret Mascarenhas in 2008

In the mid-2000s, Mascarenhas began a mailing list with Wendell Rodricks, urging citizens to report cases of lack of waste management in Goa. She was the founding co-director the Blue Shores Prison Art Project, a prison art curriculum designed for inmates that focuses on the interrelationships between image and text. She was on the Advisory Boards of the Sunaparanta Goa Centre for the Arts and Goa Photo.

In the 2010 edition of Skin, she wrote:

In its first avatar, and all its reprints, the penultimate draft of the MS of Skin was the version published by Penguin India, an accidental slip never amended for nine years, mostly because the penultimate version did fine. However, this has always been an issue I knew I would eventually want to address, given the time and the opportunity, which presented itself recently. My purpose in republishing Skin is of course to correct an error that has bothered me for a long time, like an itch. But my purpose in doing it in collaboration with Broadway and Goa,1556 is to highlight the nexus between literature and art and to promote Goa-based writers and artists/art photographers. On the cover of this edition is a painting by Ravi Kerkar. Hopefully, we will be seeing a line of books emerging from this collaboration that makes it a point to use local talent for cover art.

== Personal life ==
Mascarenhas' blog described her as a "dog whisperer" and one who "sometimes masquerades as jazz singer and chef". She spent the final years of her life in Goa, from where her father originated. There she was a prominent figure in the writing circuit, and also mentored other writers through workshops and other events.

== Death ==
Mascarenhas died in Goa, following a long illness on 14 July 2019. She was believed to have been suffering from cancer. She was in her late fifties.
