= Eunice de Souza =

Indian poet and critic (1940–2017)

- Born: 1 August 1940 Poona, Bombay Province, British India (now Pune, Maharashtra, India)
- Died: 29 July 2017 (aged 76) Mumbai, Maharashtra, India
- Occupation: Poet, literary critic, novelist
- Citizenship: British Raj (until 1947); India (from 1947)

Eunice de Souza (1 August 1940 – 29 July 2017) was an Indian English language poet, literary critic and novelist. Among her notable books of poetry are Women in Dutch painting (1988), Ways of Belonging (1990), Nine Indian Women Poets (1997), These My Words (2012), and Learn From The Almond Leaf (2016). She published two novels, Dangerlok (2001), and Dev & SImran (2003), and was also the editor of a number of anthologies on poetry, folktales, and literary criticism.

== Early life and education ==
Eunice de Souza was born and grew up in Poona, in a Goan Catholic family. She studied English literature with an MA from Marquette University in Wisconsin, and a PhD from the University of Mumbai.

She taught English at St. Xavier's College, Mumbai, and was Head of the department until her retirement. She was involved in the well-known literary festival, Ithaka, organized at the college. She was involved in theater, both as actress and director, and began writing novels with her first, Dangerlok, published in 2001. She also wrote four children's books.

She hints at an ancestral Portuguese conversion in the poem de Souza Prabhu:

No, I'm not going to
delve deep down and discover
I'm really de Souza Prabhu
even if Prabhu was no fool
and got the best of both worlds.
(Catholic Brahmin!
I can hear his fat chuckle still.)

Aside from poetry and fiction, de Souza edited numerous anthologies and collections and wrote a weekly column for the Mumbai Mirror. Her poetry is also included in Anthology of Contemporary Indian Poetry ( United States).

She died on 29 July 2017, aged 76.

Her work "A Necklace Of Skulls" has been translated into Portuguese, Italian, Finnish and Swedish.

== Works ==
Poetry

- Fix (1979)
- Women in Dutch Painting (1988)
- Ways of Belonging (1990)
- Selected and New Poems (1994)
- A Necklace Of Skulls (2009)
- Learn from the Almond Leaf (Poetrywala, 2016)

Novels

- Dangerlok (Penguin, 2001)
- Dev & Simran: A Novel (Penguin, 2003) Review, tribuneindia.com. 27 July 2003.

Interviews

- Conversations with Indian Poets (OUP, 2001); ISBN 978-0-19-564782-2

Edited

- Nine Indian Women Poets: An Anthology (OUP, 2001); ISBN 978-0-19-565847-7
- 101 Folktales From India (2004)
- Purdah: An Anthology (OUP, 2004); ISBN 0-19-566661-5
- Women's Voices: Selections from Nineteenth and Early Twentieth Century Indian Writing in English. (Co-edited with Lindsay Pereira, OUP, 2004); ISBN 978-0-19-566785-1 Review, Timesofindia.indiatimes.com. 14 October 2012.
- Early Indian Poetry in English: An Anthology 1829-1947 (OUP, 2005); ISBN 978-0-19-567724-9 Review, Hindu.com. 4 December 2005.
- The Satthianadhan Family Album (Sahitya Akademi, 2005) Review, Hindu.com. 2 October 2005.
- These My Words: The Penguin Book of Indian Poetry (co-edited with Melanie Silgardo, Penguin 2012)

== See also ==
- Indian English literature: Eunice de Souza - Critical Biography
