= Ananta Rau Sar Dessai =

Indian writer and poet

- Born: 1910 (age 115–116); Mardol, Goa, Portuguese India
- Occupations: Writer; playwright; poet; physician
- Years active: 1930s–1960s

Ananta Rau Sar Dessai (1910 – unknown) was an Indian short-story writer, radio playwright, poet, and medical practitioner. He was one of a handful of Goan Hindus to have used Portuguese as his literary language, though he wrote also in Marathi. He was perhaps the only dedicated fictionist in Portuguese to have operated in Goa throughout the Estado Novo (New State). 'His idiosyncratic language, raw provocative themes, and the great ambiguity with which he treats his subjects, make Sar Dessai one of the more interesting Goan writers to have worked in Portuguese'.

== Biography ==
Sar Dessai was born in 1910 and practised medicine in the town of Mardol, Portuguese Goa. He drew on his experience as a clinician for many of his plays and short narratives, such as Um Cavalheiro Amável (A Pleasant Gentleman) and Vaxina, dá-me um pouco de Vaxina também (Vacshin, give me some vacshin too).

== Literary career ==
Sau Dessai penned over 30 radio plays, some of which were broadcast, for example via the former Emissora de Goa. Others were published in the now-defunct Portuguese-language press of Goa, in papers such as O Heraldo and A Luta. He also wrote in Marathi, but little work has been done to establish his corpus in this language.

=== Themes in his Short Stories and Radio Plays ===
Sar Dessai's short stories are often about poverty and the lack of social justice. Indeed, in some of his stories, he is the closest Goa had in the Portuguese-language to an explicitly anti-colonial literary stance towards Salazar's Estado Novo. Rare for a writer of his time, several of his narratives take place in the hinterland of Goa known as the Novas Conquistas, where Hindus have always formed the majority of the population and where the effects of Portuguese colonialism were rather different than in the coastal strip of Goa.

==== Loss of Anthology ====
An anthology of Sar Dessai's short stories and radio plays was prepared by the Portuguese critic Manuel de Seabra in the mid 1970s. It was submitted to the Agência Geral do Ultramar, the Portuguese government agency dedicated to publishing work from the Portuguese overseas territories, but never commissioned and the manuscript never returned. The likelihood is that the manuscript was discarded when the dictatorship fell. Unless a copy of these texts has been retained in Goa - Seabra did not keep a copy for his personal records - it seems that at least half the author's oeuvre has unfortunately been lost.

=== Poems in Portuguese ===
Sar Dessai's few poems in Portuguese were written after 1961 and mostly concern Indian nationalist themes.

- 15 de Agosto 1962
- Presto-te Homenagem Lokmanya 1962
